= List of Knight's Cross of the Iron Cross with Oak Leaves recipients (1943) =

The Knight's Cross of the Iron Cross (German: Ritterkreuz des Eisernen Kreuzes) and its variants were the highest awards in the military and paramilitary forces of Nazi Germany during World War II. This decoration was awarded for a wide range of reasons and across all ranks, from a senior commander for skilled leadership of his troops in battle to a low-ranking soldier for a single act of extreme gallantry. The Knight's Cross of the Iron Cross with Oak Leaves (Ritterkreuz des Eisernen Kreuzes mit Eichenlaub) was introduced on 3 June 1940 to further distinguish those who had already received the Knight's Cross of the Iron Cross and who continued to show merit in combat bravery or military success. A total of 7 awards were made in 1940; 50 in 1941; 111 in 1942; 192 in 1943; 328 in 1944, and 194 in 1945, giving a total of 882 recipients—excluding the 8 foreign recipients of the award.

The number of 882 Oak Leaves recipients is based on the analysis and acceptance of the order commission of the Association of Knight's Cross Recipients (AKCR). However, author Veit Scherzer has challenged the validity of 27 of these listings. With the exception of Hermann Fegelein, all of the disputed recipients had received the award in 1945, when the deteriorating situation during the final days of World War II in Germany left a number of nominations incomplete and pending in various stages of the approval process. Fegelein received the Oak Leaves in 1942, but was sentenced to death by Adolf Hitler and executed by SS-Gruppenführer Johann Rattenhuber's Reichssicherheitsdienst (RSD) on 28 April 1945 after a court-martial led by SS-Brigadeführer and Generalmajor of the Waffen-SS Wilhelm Mohnke. The sentence was carried out the same day. The death sentence, according to German law, resulted in the loss of all orders and honorary signs.

== Background ==
The Knight's Cross of the Iron Cross and its higher grades were based on four separate enactments. The first enactment, Reichsgesetzblatt I S. 1573 of 1 September 1939 instituted the Iron Cross (Eisernes Kreuz), the Knight's Cross of the Iron Cross and the Grand Cross of the Iron Cross (Großkreuz des Eisernen Kreuzes). Article 2 of the enactment mandated that the award of a higher class be preceded by the award of all preceding classes. As the war progressed, some of the recipients of the Knight's Cross distinguished themselves further and a higher grade, the Oak Leaves to the Knight's Cross of the Iron Cross, was instituted. The Oak Leaves, as they were commonly referred to, were based on the enactment Reichsgesetzblatt I S. 849 of 3 June 1940. In 1941, two higher grades of the Knight's Cross were instituted. The enactment Reichsgesetzblatt I S. 613 of 28 September 1941 introduced the Knight's Cross of the Iron Cross with Oak Leaves and Swords (Ritterkreuz des Eisernen Kreuzes mit Eichenlaub und Schwertern) and the Knight's Cross of the Iron Cross with Oak Leaves, Swords and Diamonds (Ritterkreuz des Eisernen Kreuzes mit Eichenlaub, Schwertern und Brillanten). At the end of 1944 the final grade, the Knight's Cross of the Iron Cross with Golden Oak Leaves, Swords, and Diamonds (Ritterkreuz des Eisernen Kreuzes mit goldenem Eichenlaub, Schwertern und Brillanten), based on the enactment Reichsgesetzblatt 1945 I S. 11 of 29 December 1944, became the final variant of the Knight's Cross authorized.

== Recipients of 1943 ==
Knight's Cross of the Iron Cross with Oak Leaves
| Year | Number of presentations | Posthumous presentations |
|---|---|---|
| 1940 | 7 | 0 |
| 1941 | 50 | 3 |
| 1942 | 111 | 7 |
| 1943 | 192 | 17 |
| 1944 | 328 | 46 |
| 1945 | 194 | 19 |

The Oberkommando der Wehrmacht (OKW—Supreme Command of the Armed Forces) kept separate Knight's Cross lists, one for each of the three military branches, Heer (Army), Kriegsmarine (Navy), Luftwaffe (Air force) and for the Waffen-SS. Within each of these lists a unique sequential number was assigned to each recipient. The same numbering paradigm was applied to the higher grades of the Knight's Cross, one list per grade. The sequential numbers greater than 143 for the Knight's Cross of the Iron Cross with Oak Leaves and Swords are unofficial and were assigned by the Association of Knight's Cross Recipients (AKCR) and are therefore denoted in parentheses. The recipients are ordered chronologically and numbered by the official sequential number assigned by the OKW. The rank listed is the recipient's rank at the time the Knight's Cross with Oak Leaves was awarded.

This along with the + (plus) indicates that a higher grade of Knight's Cross was awarded as well.
This along with the * (asterisk) indicates that the Knight's Cross with Oak Leaves was awarded posthumously.
This along with the ? (question mark) indicates that author Veit Scherzer has expressed doubt regarding the veracity or formal correctness of the listing.

| Number | Name | Service | Rank | Role and unit (Note: For an explanation of the various naming schemes used by the Luftwaffe, Heer, Kriegsmarine and Waffen-SS refer to nomenclature used by the Wehrmacht and Waffen-SS.) | Date of award | Notes | Image |
|---|---|---|---|---|---|---|---|
| 169 | Reiner Stahel+ | Luftwaffe | Oberst | Commander of Luftwaffe-Kampfgruppe (Note: According to Scherzer as commander of Luftwaffe-Kampfgruppe "Stahel") | 4 January 1943 | Awarded 79th Swords 18 July 1944 | |
| 170 | Fritz Feßmann+ | Heer | Oberleutnant of the Reserves | Chief of the 1./Kradschützen-Bataillon 64 | 4 January 1943 | Awarded 103rd Swords 23 October 1944 | — |
| 171 | Friedrich Guggenberger | Kriegsmarine | Kapitänleutnant | Commander of U-81 | 8 January 1943 | — | Black-and-white portrait of a smiling man with peaked cap. |
| 172 | Heinz Frank | Luftwaffe | Oberleutnant | Staffelkapitän of the 3./Schlachtgeschwader 1 | 8 January 1943 | — | — |
| 173 | Dr. jur. Ernst Kupfer+ | Luftwaffe | Major | Gruppenkommandeur of the II./Sturzkampfgeschwader 2 "Immelmann" | 8 January 1943 | Awarded 62nd Swords 11 April 1944 | — |
| 174 | Bruno Dilley | Luftwaffe | Hauptmann | Gruppenkommandeur of the I./Sturzkampfgeschwader 2 "Immelmann" | 8 January 1943 | — | — |
| 175 | Gerhard Barkhorn+ | Luftwaffe | Oberleutnant | Staffelkapitän of the 4./Jagdgeschwader 52 | 11 January 1943 | Awarded 52nd Swords 2 March 1944 | |
| 176 | Wend von Wietersheim+ | Heer | Oberst | Commander of Panzergrenadier-Regiment 113 | 12 January 1943 | Awarded 58th Swords 26 March 1944 | Black-and-white portrait of a man in semi profile wearing a military uniform with an Iron Cross displayed at his neck. |
| 177 | Johann Mohr | Kriegsmarine | Kapitänleutnant | Commander of U-124 | 13 January 1943 | — | — |
| 178 | Friedrich Paulus | Heer | Generaloberst | Commander-in-chief of the 6. Armee | 15 January 1943 | — | Black-and-white portrait of a man in semi profile wearing a military uniform with an Iron Cross displayed at his neck. |
| 179 | Karl Willig | Heer | Major | Commander of the II./Grenadier-Regiment 120 (motorized) | 18 January 1943 | — | — |
| 180 | Günter Goebel | Heer | Hauptmann | Leader of a Kampfgruppe with the AOK 6 | 18 January 1943 | — | Black-and-white portrait of a smiling man wearing a peaked cap, military uniform with an Iron Cross displayed at his neck. |
| 181 | Günther von Kluge+ | Heer | Generalfeldmarschall | Commander-in-chief of Heeresgruppe Mitte | 18 January 1943 | Awarded 40th Swords 29 October 1943 | Black-and-white portrait of an older man wearing a military uniform with an Iron Cross displayed at his neck, his hair is combed back. |
| 182 | Waldemar von Gazen called von Gaza+ | Heer | Hauptmann | Leader of a Kampfgruppe in the 13. Panzer-Division (I./Panzergrenadier-Regiment 66) (Note: According to Scherzer as leader of I./Panzergrenadier-Regiment 66.) | 18 January 1943 | Awarded 38th Swords 3 October 1943 | |
| 183 | Hans Kreysing+ | Heer | Generalleutnant | Commander of the 3. Gebirgs-Division | 20 January 1943 | Awarded 63rd Swords 13 April 1944 | A black-and-white photograph of a man in semi profile wearing a military uniform and a neck order in shape of an Iron Cross. |
| 184 | Reinhard Günzel | Luftwaffe | Major | Gruppenkommandeur of the II./Kampfgeschwader 27 "Boelcke" | 21 January 1943 | — | — |
| 185 | Hugo Primozic | Heer | Oberwachtmeister | Zugführer (platoon leader) in the 2./Sturmgeschütz-Abteilung 667 | 25 January 1943 | At the same time promoted to Leutnant | — |
| 186 | Willy Riedel | Heer | Hauptmann | Commander of the III./Infanterie-Regiment 524 | 25 January 1943 | — | Black-and-white portrait of a man with a military uniform, side cap and an Iron Cross displayed at his neck. |
| 187 | Georg Michael | Heer | Oberleutnant of the Reserves | Leader of the II./Panzergrenadier-Regiment 26 | 25 January 1943 | — | — |
| 188 | Gustav Pressler | Luftwaffe | Major | Gruppenkommandeur of the III./Sturzkampfgeschwader 2 "Immelmann" | 26 January 1943 | — | — |
| 189 | Carl Rodenburg | Heer | Generalleutnant | Commander of the 76. Infanterie-Division | 31 January 1943 | — | — |
| 190 | Reinhold Knacke | Luftwaffe | Hauptmann | Staffelkapitän of the 3./Nachtjagdgeschwader 1 | 7 February 1943* (Note: According to Scherzer on 5 February 1943.) | Killed in action 3 February 1943 | — |
| 191 | Erwin Fischer | Luftwaffe | Hauptmann | Staffelkapitän of the 1./Fernaufklärungs-Gruppe 121 (Note: According to Scherzer as Staffelkapitän of the Aufklärungsstaffel 1.(F)/121.) | 8 February 1943 | — | — |
| 192 | Hermann Hogeback+ | Luftwaffe | Hauptmann | Gruppenkommandeur of the III./Lehrgeschwader 1 | 19 February 1943 | Awarded 125th Swords 26 January 1945 | — |
| 193 | Helmut Bruck | Luftwaffe | Hauptmann | Gruppenkommandeur of the I./Sturzkampfgeschwader 77 | 19 February 1943 | — | — |
| 194 | Alfons König+ | Heer | Hauptmann of the Reserves | Commander of the III./Grenadier-Regiment 217 | 21 February 1943 | Awarded 70th Swords 9 June 1944 | — |
| 195 | Kurt Meyer+ | Waffen-SS | SS-Obersturmbannführer | Commander of SS-Aufklärungs-Abteilung "Leibstandarte SS Adolf Hitler" | 23 February 1943 | Awarded 91st Swords 27 August 1944 | A black-and-white photograph of a smiling man wearing a military uniform, peaked cap and neck order, in shape of an Iron Cross. |
| 196 | Paul Gildner | Luftwaffe | Oberleutnant | Pilot in the 3./Nachtjagdgeschwader 1 (Note: According to Scherzer as pilot in the 4./Nachtjagdgeschwader 1.) | 26 February 1943* | Killed in action 24 February 1943 | — |
| 197 | Werner Streib+ | Luftwaffe | Major | Gruppenkommandeur of the I./Nachtjagdgeschwader 1 | 26 February 1943 | Awarded 54th Swords 11 March 1944 | |
| 198 | Ludwig Becker | Luftwaffe | Hauptmann (Note: According to Scherzer as Oberleutnant of the Reserves and Staffelkapitän of the 6./Nachtjagdgeschwader 1.) | Staffelkapitän of the 12./Nachtjagdgeschwader 2 | 26 February 1943* | Killed in action 26 February 1943 | — |
| 199 | Werner Baumgarten-Crusius | Heer | Oberleutnant | Leader of the I./Grenadier-Regiment 156 (motorized) | 27 February 1943 | — | — |
| 200 | Fritz Witt | Waffen-SS | SS-Standartenführer | Commander of SS-Panzergrenadier-Regiment 1 "Leibstandarte SS Adolf Hitler" | 1 March 1943 | — | |
| 201 | Hans Mikosch | Heer | Oberst | Commander of Pionier-Regiment Stab z.b.V. 677 and leader of a Kampfgruppe in the area of Stalingrad | 6 March 1943 | — | — |
| 202 | Walter Scheunemann | Heer | Hauptmann | Commander of the I./Grenadier-Regiment 272 | 6 March 1943 | — | — |
| 203 | Gustav Schmidt | Heer | Generalleutnant | Commander of 19. Panzer-Division | 6 March 1943 | — | — |
| 204 | Dr. rer. oec. Eberhard Zahn | Heer | Hauptmann of the Reserves | Chief of 2./Panzer-Jäger-Abteilung 33 | 6 March 1943 | — | — |
| 205 | Johann Mickl | Heer | Oberst | Commander of Panzergrenadier-Regiment 25 | 6 March 1943 | — | — |
| 206 | Wilhelm von Malachowski | Heer | Hauptmann | Commander of Sturmgeschütz-Abteilung 228 | 6 March 1943 | — | — |
| 207 | Bruno Kohnz | Heer | Oberfeldwebel | Zugführer (platoon leader) in the 11./Jäger-Regiment 207 | 6 March 1943 | — | — |
| 208 | Georg Lassen | Kriegsmarine | Kapitänleutnant | Commander of U-160 | 7 March 1943 | — | — |
| 209 | Erich von Lewinski called von Manstein+ | Heer | Generalfeldmarschall | Commander-in-chief of Heeresgruppe Süd | 14 March 1943 | Awarded 59th Swords 30 March 1944 | Black-and-white portrait of an older man wearing a military uniform, his hair is combed back. |
| 210 | Georg Rietscher | Heer | Unteroffizier | VB (forward observer) in the 14./Grenadier-Regiment 513 (Note: According to Scherzer as "in the 14./Grenadier-Regiment 513", without specifying the position.) | 14 March 1943 | — | |
| 211 | Karl Langesee | Heer | Major | Commander of the II./Jäger-Regiment 207 | 15 March 1943 | — | — |
| 212 | Josef Kult | Heer | Oberleutnant of the Reserves | Chief of the 3./Jäger-Regiment 228 | 15 March 1943* | Killed in action 22 February 1943 posthumously promoted to Hauptman of the Reserves | — |
| 213 | Walter Hörnlein | Heer | Generalleutnant | Commander of Infanterie-Division (motorized) "Großdeutschland" | 15 March 1943 | — | — |
| 214 | Theodor Nordmann+ | Luftwaffe | Oberleutnant | Acting Gruppenkommandeur of the III./Sturzkampfgeschwader 1 (Note: According to Scherzer as leader of the III./Sturzkampfgeschwader 1.) | 17 March 1943 (Note: According to Scherzer on 16 March 1943.) | Awarded 98th Swords 17 September 1944 | — |
| 215 | Georg-Wilhelm Postel+ | Heer | Generalmajor | Commander of the 320. Infanterie-Division | 28 March 1943 | Awarded 57th Swords 26 March 1944 | — |
| 216 | Robert Ritter von Greim+ | Luftwaffe | Generaloberst | Commander-in-chief of Luftflottenkommando Ost (Luftflotte 6) | 2 April 1943 | Awarded 92nd Swords 28 August 1944 (Note: According to Scherzer on 27 August 1944.) | Black-and-white portrait of a man wearing a military uniform displaying two military decorations at his neck, his hair is combed back. |
| 217 | Hans-Karl von Scheele | Heer | Generalleutnant | Commanding general of Korps "Scheele" | 2 April 1943 | — | — |
| 218 | Heinrich Schüler | Heer | Hauptmann of the Reserves | Commander of the II./Grenadier-Regiment 525 | 2 April 1943 | — | — |
| 219 | Helmut Hudel | Heer | Hauptmann | Commander of the I./Panzer-Regiment 7 | 2 April 1943 | — | A black-and-white photograph of a man wearing a military uniform, side cap and a neck order in shape of an Iron Cross. |
| 220 | Hinrich Schuldt+ | Waffen-SS | SS-Standartenführer | Commander of SS-Brigade "Schuldt" also Kampfgruppe "Schuld": I./SS-Polizei-Schützen-Regiment 1 and VII./Leibstandarte SS Adolf Hitler | 2 April 1943 | Awarded 56th Swords 25 March 1944 | — |
| 221 | Otto Kumm+ | Waffen-SS | SS-Obersturmbannführer | Commander of SS-Panzergrenadier-Regiment "Der Führer" | 6 April 1943 | Awarded 138th Swords 17 March 1945 | Black-and-white photo of a man wearing a peaked cap, military uniform with an Iron Cross displayed at his neck. |
| 222 | Rudolf Schlee | Heer | Oberfeldwebel | Zugführer (platoon leader) in the 6./Gebirgsjäger-Regiment 13 | 6 April 1943 | — | — |
| 223 | Karl Dönitz | Kriegsmarine | Großadmiral | Oberbefehlshaber der Kriegsmarine and Befehlshaber der U-Boote | 6 April 1943 | — | Black-and-white portrait of a man wearing a navy uniform displaying various military decorations and a neck order in shape of an Iron Cross, his hair is combed back. |
| 224 | Albrecht Brandi+ | Kriegsmarine | Korvettenkapitän | Commander of U-617 | 11 April 1943 | Awarded 66th Swords 9 May 1944; 22nd Diamonds 24 November 1944 | |
| 225 | Gerhard von Kamptz | Kriegsmarine | Fregattenkapitän | Chief of the 8. Räumbootsflottille | 14 April 1943 | — | — |
| 226 | Siegfried Wuppermann | Kriegsmarine | Oberleutnant zur See | Commander of Schnellboot S-56 in the 3. Schnellbootflottille (Note: According to Scherzer as commander of Schnellboot S-56.) | 14 April 1943 | — | — |
| 227 | Erich Klawe | Heer | Major | Commander of the I./Grenadier-Regiment 23 | 14 April 1943 | — | — |
| 228 | Peter Frantz | Heer | Hauptmann | Commander of Sturmgeschütz-Abteilung "Großdeutschland" | 14 April 1943 | — | — |
| 229 | Hans-Ulrich Rudel+ | Luftwaffe | Oberleutnant | Staffelkapitän of the 1./Sturzkampfgeschwader 2 "Immelmann" | 14 April 1943 | Awarded 42nd Swords 25 November 1943; 10th Diamonds 29 March 1944; 1st Golden Oak Leaves 29 December 1944 | |
| 230 | Paul-Werner Hozzel | Luftwaffe | Oberstleutnant | Geschwaderkommodore of Sturzkampfgeschwader 2 "Immelmann" | 14 April 1943 | — | |
| 231 | Georg Dörffel | Luftwaffe | Hauptmann | Acting Gruppenkommandeur of the I./Schlachtgeschwader 1 (Note: According to Scherzer as leader of the I./Schlachtgeschwader 1.) | 14 April 1943 | — | Color portrait of a man wearing a peaked cap, military uniform with an Iron Cross displayed at his neck. |
| 232 | Egon Mayer+ | Luftwaffe | Hauptmann | Gruppenkommandeur of the III./Jagdgeschwader 2 "Richthofen" | 16 April 1943 | Awarded 51st Swords 2 March 1944 | |
| 233 | August Dieckmann+ | Waffen-SS | SS-Sturmbannführer | Commander of the I./SS-Panzergrenadier-Regiment "Germania" | 16 April 1943 | Awarded 39th Swords 10 October 1943 | Black-and-white portrait of a man wearing a peaked cap, military uniform with an Iron Cross displayed at his neck. |
| 234 | Otto von Bülow | Kriegsmarine | Kapitänleutnant | Commander of U-404 | 26 April 1943 | — | — |
| 235 | Willibald Borowietz | Heer | Generalmajor | Commander of the 15. Panzer-Division | 10 May 1943 | — | — |
| 236 | Hans-Günther Stotten | Heer | Hauptmann | Commander of the I./Panzer-Regiment 8 | 10 May 1943 | — | — |
| 237 | Paul Laux | Heer | General der Infanterie | Commanding general of the II. Armeekorps | 17 May 1943 | — | — |
| 238 | Gustav Höhne | Heer | Generalleutnant | Commanding general of Korps "Laux" | 17 May 1943 | — | — |
| 239 | Karl-Adolf Hollidt | Heer | General der Infanterie | Commander-in-chief of 6. Armee | 17 May 1943 | — | |
| 240 | Gerhard von Schwerin+ | Heer | Generalmajor | Commander of the 16. Infanterie-Division (motorized) | 17 May 1943 | Awarded 41st Swords 4 November 1943 | |
| 241 | Wilhelm Niggemeyer | Heer | Oberleutnant of the Reserves | Bataillonsadjutant of Pionier-Bataillon 26 | 17 May 1943 | — | — |
| 242 | Franz Griesbach+ | Heer | Oberst | Commander of Grenadier-Regiment 399 | 17 May 1943 | Awarded 53rd Swords 6 March 1944 | |
| 243 | Erich Bärenfänger+ | Heer | Hauptmann | Commander of the III./Grenadier-Regiment 123 | 17 May 1943 | Awarded 45th Swords 23 January 1944 | — |
| 244 | Richard Grünert | Heer | Major of the Reserves | Commander of the I./Panzergrenadier-Regiment 7 | 17 May 1943* | Killed in action 13 March 1943 | — |
| 245 | Ernst Kruse | Heer | Oberfeldwebel | Zugführer (platoon leader) in the 7./Panzergrenadier-Regiment 3 | 17 May 1943 | — | — |
| 246 | Georg Bochmann+ | Waffen-SS | SS-Sturmbannführer | Commander of the II./SS-Kradschützen-Regiment "Thule" | 17 May 1943 | Awarded 140th Swords 26 March 1945 | A black-and-white photograph of a man wearing a military uniform and neck order in shape of an Iron Cross. His hair is combed back and his facial expression is determined. |
| 247 | Karl Löwrick | Heer | Oberst | Commander of Grenadier-Regiment 272 | 17 May 1943 | — | — |
| 248 | Martin Grase | Heer | Generalleutnant | Commander of the 1. Infanterie-Division | 23 May 1943 | — | — |
| 249 | Friedrich Kemnade | Kriegsmarine | Korvettenkapitän | Chief of the 3. Schnellbootflottille | 27 May 1943 | — | — |
| 250 | Robert Gysae | Kriegsmarine | Kapitänleutnant | Commander of U-177 | 31 May 1943 | — | — |
| 251 | Hans von Obstfelder+ | Heer | General der Infanterie | Commanding general of the XXIX. Armeekorps | 7 June 1943 | Awarded 110th Swords 5 November 1944 | A man wearing full military uniform, including greatcoat, with an Iron Cross displayed at his neck. |
| 252 | Karl Göbel | Heer | Oberstleutnant | Commander of Grenadier-Regiment 420 | 8 June 1943 | — | — |
| 253 | Friedrich Höhne | Heer | Major | Commander of the III./Jäger-Regiment 204 | 8 June 1943 | — | — |
| 254 | Günter Klappich | Heer | Oberleutnant | Leader of the III./Grenadier-Regiment (motorized) 60 | 8 June 1943* | Killed in action 22 January 1943 | — |
| 255 | Gustav Rödel | Luftwaffe | Major | Geschwaderkommodore of Jagdgeschwader 27 | 20 June 1943 | — | — |
| 256 | Carl Emmermann | Kriegsmarine | Kapitänleutnant | Commander of U-172 | 4 July 1943 | — | |
| 257 | Werner Henke | Kriegsmarine | Kapitänleutnant | Commander of U-515 | 4 July 1943 | — | Black-and-white portrait of a man wearing a military uniform, white shirt with an Iron Cross displayed at his neck. |
| 258 | Fritz Bayerlein+ | Heer | Generalmajor | German chief of staff of the 1st Italian Army | 6 July 1943 | Awarded 81st Swords 20 July 1944 | A black-and-white photograph of an older man wearing a military uniform, field cap and a neck order in shape of an Iron Cross. |
| 259 | Walther von Hünersdorff | Heer | Generalmajor | Commander of 6. Panzer-Division | 14 July 1943 | — | A black-and-white photograph of a man wearing a dark military uniform, side cap and a neck order in shape of an Iron Cross. |
| 260 | Bernhard Sauvant | Heer | Major | Commander of schwere Panzer-Abteilung 505 | 28 July 1943 | — | — |
| 261 | Paul Hausser+ | Waffen-SS | SS-Obergruppenführer and General of the Waffen-SS | Commanding general of the II. SS-Panzerkorps | 28 July 1943 | Awarded 90th Swords 26 August 1944 | Black-and-white portrait of an older man wearing a peaked cap, military uniform with an Iron Cross displayed at his neck. |
| 262 | Dr. med. dent. Franz Bäke+ | Heer | Major of the Reserves | Commander of the II./Panzer-Regiment 11 | 1 August 1943 | Awarded 49th Swords 21 February 1944 | A black-and-white photograph of a man wearing a dark military uniform with a neck order in shape of an Iron Cross. |
| 263 | Egmont Prinz zur Lippe-Weißenfeld | Luftwaffe | Hauptmann | Gruppenkommandeur of the III./Nachtjagdgeschwader 2 | 2 August 1943 | — | Prince Zur Lippe-Weißenfeld is casually sitting and smiling. The Knight's Cross of the Iron Cross, German Cross in Gold and Pilots Badge can be seen on his uniform. |
| 264 | Manfred Meurer | Luftwaffe | Hauptmann | Staffelkapitän of the 3./Nachtjagdgeschwader 1 | 2 August 1943 | — | — |
| 265 | Heinrich Ehrler | Luftwaffe | Hauptmann | Gruppenkommandeur of the III./Jagdgeschwader 5 | 2 August 1943 | — | |
| 266 | Theodor Weissenberger | Luftwaffe | Oberleutnant | Staffelkapitän of the 7./Jagdgeschwader 5 | 2 August 1943 | — | Black-and-white portrait of a man wearing a military uniform with an Iron Cross displayed at his neck, his curly hair is combed back. |
| 267 | Joachim Kirschner | Luftwaffe | Oberleutnant | Staffelkapitän of the 5./Jagdgeschwader 3 "Udet" | 2 August 1943 | — | — |
| 268 | Werner Schröer+ | Luftwaffe | Hauptmann | Gruppenkommandeur of the II./Jagdgeschwader 27 | 2 August 1943 | Awarded (144th) Swords 19 April 1945 | — |
| 269 | Hajo Herrmann+ | Luftwaffe | Major | Geschwaderkommodore of Jagdgeschwader 300 | 2 August 1943 | Awarded 43rd Swords 23 January 1944 | Black-and-white portrait of a man wearing a military uniform with an Iron Cross displayed at his neck. |
| 270 | Bruno Kahl | Heer | Major | Commander of the III./schweres Heeres Panzerjäger-Regiment 656 | 8 August 1943 | — | — |
| 271 | Dr. jur. Lothar Rendulic+ | Heer | General der Infanterie | Commanding general of the XXXV. Armeekorps | 15 August 1943 | Awarded 122nd Swords 18 January 1945 | A black-and-white photograph of a man in semi profile wearing a military uniform, field cap, glasses and a neck order in shape of an Iron Cross. |
| 272 | Dietrich von Müller+ | Heer | Oberst | Commander of Panzergrenadier-Regiment 5 | 16 August 1943 | Awarded 134th Swords 20 February 1945 | — |
| 273 | Georg von Küchler | Heer | Generalfeldmarschall | Commander-in-chief of Heeresgruppe Nord | 21 August 1943 | — | Black-and-white portrait of an older man wearing a peaked cap, military uniform with an Iron Cross displayed at his neck. |
| 274 | Ernst Busch | Heer | Generalfeldmarschall | Commander-in-chief of 16. Armee | 21 August 1943 | — | Black-and-white outdoor shot of an older man wearing a military uniform and an Iron Cross decoration suspended from his neck. |
| 275 | Georg Lindemann | Heer | Generaloberst | Commander-in-chief of 18. Armee | 21 August 1943 | — | Black-and-white portrait of a determined looking man wearing a military uniform with an Iron Cross displayed at his neck, his hair is combed back. |
| 276 | Paul Conrath | Luftwaffe | Generalmajor | Commander of Fallschirm-Panzer-Division "Hermann Göring" | 21 August 1943 (Note: According to Scherzer on 22 August 1943.) | — | |
| 277 | Otto Baum+ | Waffen-SS | SS-Obersturmbannführer | Commander of SS-Panzergrenadier-Regiment "Totenkopf" (Note: According to Scherzer as commander of SS-Panzergrenadier-Regiment "Thule".) | 22 August 1943 | Awarded 95th Swords 2 September 1944 | — |
| 278 | Hans Freiherr von Funck | Heer | Generalleutnant (Note: According to Scherzer as Generalmajor.) | Commander of 7. Panzer-Division | 22 August 1943 | — | — |
| 279 | Alexander Conrady | Heer | Oberst | Commander of Grenadier-Regiment 118 | 22 August 1943 | — | — |
| 280 | Erhard Raus | Heer | General der Panzertruppe | Commanding general of the XI. Armeekorps | 22 August 1943 | — | — |
| 281 | Dietrich von Saucken+ | Heer | Generalleutnant | Commander of 4. Panzer-Division | 22 August 1943 | Awarded 46th Swords 31 January 1944; 27th Diamonds 8 May 1945 | — |
| 282 | Hans Gollnick | Heer | Generalleutnant | Commander of the 36. Panzergrenadier-Division | 24 August 1943 | — | — |
| 283 | Alfred Eidel | Heer | Major | Commander of the I./Grenadier-Regiment 171 | 24 August 1943 | — | — |
| 284 | Paul Schultz | Heer | Oberst | Commander of Grenadier-Regiment 308 | 26 August 1943 | — | — |
| 285 | Hans-Detloff von Cossel | Heer | Major | Commander of the I./Panzer-Regiment 35 | 29 August 1943* | Killed in action 22 July 1943 | — |
| 286 | Walter Krüger+ | Waffen-SS | SS-Gruppenführer and Generalleutnant of the Waffen-SS | Commander of SS-Panzergrenadier-Division "Das Reich" | 31 August 1943 | Awarded 120th Swords 11 January 1945 | |
| 287 | Rolf Rocholl | Heer | Hauptmann | Commander of the III./Grenadier-Regiment 569 | 31 August 1943* | Killed in action 23 August 1943 | — |
| 288 | Hartmann Grasser | Luftwaffe | Major | Gruppenkommandeur of the II./Jagdgeschwader 51 "Mölders" | 31 August 1943 | — | — |
| 289 | Wolf-Udo Ettel | Luftwaffe | Oberleutnant | Staffelkapitän of the 8./Jagdgeschwader 27 | 31 August 1943* | Killed in action 17 July 1943 | — |
| 290 | Heinrich Prinz zu Sayn-Wittgenstein+ | Luftwaffe | Hauptmann | Gruppenkommandeur of the I./Nachtjagdgeschwader 100 (Note: According to Scherzer as Gruppenkommandeur of the IV./Nachtjagdgeschwader 5) | 31 August 1943 | Awarded 44th Swords 23 January 1944 | |
| 291 | Hans Zorn | Heer | General der Infanterie | Commanding general of the XXXXVI. Panzerkorps | 3 September 1943* | Killed in action 2 August 1943 | |
| 292 | Horst Großmann | Heer | Generalleutnant | Commander of the 6. Infanterie-Division | 4 September 1943 | — | — |
| 293 | Walter Nowotny+ | Luftwaffe | Oberleutnant | Staffelkapitän of the 1./Jagdgeschwader 54 | 4 September 1943 | Awarded 37th Swords 22 September 1943; 8th Diamonds 19 October 1943 | |
| 294 | Joachim Lemelsen | Heer | General der Panzertruppe | Commanding general of the XXXXVII. Panzerkorps | 7 September 1943 | — | |
| 295 | Erich Jaschke | Heer | General der Infanterie | Commanding general LV. Armeekorps | 7 September 1943 | — | |
| 296 | Heinz Harmel+ | Waffen-SS | SS-Standartenführer | Commander of SS-Panzergrenadier-Regiment "Deutschland" | 7 September 1943 | Awarded 116th Swords 15 December 1944 | A man wearing a military uniform, peaked cap and a neck order in the shape of a cross. His cap has an emblem in shape of a human skull and crossed bones. |
| 297 | Hermann Prieß+ | Waffen-SS | SS-Brigadeführer and Generalmajor of the Waffen-SS | Commander of SS-Panzergrenadier-Division "Totenkopf" | 9 September 1943 | Awarded 65th Swords 24 April 1944 | Black-and-white portrait of a man wearing a military uniform with an Iron Cross displayed at his neck. |
| 298 | Friedrich Hoßbach | Heer | Generalleutnant | Acting commander of LVI. Panzerkorps (Note: According to Scherzer as leader of LVI. Panzerkorps.) | 11 September 1943 | — | |
| 299 | Siegfried Thomaschki | Heer | Generalleutnant | Commander of the 11. Infanterie-Division | 11 September 1943 | — | — |
| 300 | Dr. med. dent. Walter Lange | Heer | Oberst of the Reserves | Commander of Grenadier-Regiment 43 | 13 September 1943 | — | |
| 301 | Günther Pape | Heer | Oberst | Commander of Panzergrenadier-Regiment 394 | 15 September 1943 | — | Black-and-white portrait of a man wearing a military uniform with an Iron Cross displayed at his neck, his dark hair is combed back. |
| 302 | Theodor Tolsdorff+ | Heer | Major | Commander of the I./Füsilier-Regiment 22 | 15 September 1943 | Awarded 80th Swords 18 July 1944; 25th Diamonds 18 March 1945 | — |
| 303 | Sylvester Stadler+ | Waffen-SS | SS-Obersturmbannführer | Commander of SS-Panzergrenadier-Regiment "Der Führer" | 16 September 1943 | Awarded (152nd) Swords 6 May 1945? (Note: No evidence of the award presented to Sylvester Stadler can be found in the German Federal Archives, also it is not mentioned by the order commission of the Association of Knight's Cross Recipients (AKCR). According to Fellgiebel, the award was presented by SS-Oberstgruppenführer Sepp Dietrich, which would make it an unlawful presentation. Fellgiebel is referring to Hermann Buch, the former IIa (personnel administration) of the 2. SS-Division "Das Reich", and Wilhelm Kment, the adjutant of Heinrich Himmler and liaison officer to the Heerespersonalamt (HPA—Army Staff Office), as sources. Buch reported on 25 June 2004 that he did not have anything to do with this case. Stadler himself claimed that Dietrich had nominated him on 22 March 1945, even though the 9. SS-Panzer-Division "Hohenstaufen" was not subordinated to the 6. SS-Panzerarmee. The sequential number "152" was assigned by the AKCR. The date might have been taken from Ernst-Günther Krätschmer.) | A black-and-white photograph of a man wearing a military uniform with fur collar, side cap and a neck order in shape of an Iron Cross. His cap has an emblem in shape of a human skull and crossed bones. |
| 304 | Ulrich Kleemann | Heer | Generalleutnant | Commander of Sturm-Division "Rhodos" | 16 September 1943 | — | — |
| 305 | Kurt Student | Luftwaffe | General der Flieger (Note: According to Scherzer as General der Fallschirmtruppe.) | Commanding general of the XI. Fliegerkorps (Luft-lande-Korps) | 27 September 1943 | — | Black-and-white picture of a man with peaked cap, military uniform displaying various military decorations. |
| 306 | Alfred-Hermann Reinhardt+ | Heer | Oberst | Commander of Grenadier-Regiment 421 | 28 September 1943 | Awarded 118th Swords 24 December 1944 | — |
| 307 | Hans Fritsche | Heer | Major | Commander of the I./Grenadier-Regiment 528 | 2 October 1943 | — | — |
| 308 | Bodo Spranz | Heer | Oberleutnant | Chief of the 1./Sturmgeschütz-Abteilung 237 | 3 October 1943 | — | — |
| 309 | Josef Schreiber | Heer | Oberfeldwebel | Zugführer (platoon leader) in the 7./Sturm-Regiment 14 | 5 October 1943 | — | — |
| 310 | Hubert-Erwin Meierdress | Waffen-SS | SS-Hauptsturmführer | Commander of the I./SS-Panzer-Regiment 3 "Totenkopf" | 5 October 1943 | — | — |
| 311 | Hans-Gotthard Pestke | Heer | Hauptmann | Commander of the I./Grenadier-Regiment 176 | 14 October 1943 | — | — |
| 312 | Julius Ringel | Heer | Generalleutnant | Commander of 5. Gebirgs-Division | 25 October 1943 | — | A black-and-white photograph of a bearded man wearing a military uniform, with an Iron Cross at his neck. |
| 313 | Rudolf Freiherr von Roman | Heer | General der Artillerie | Commanding general of the XX. Armeekorps | 28 October 1943 | — | |
| 314 | Ernst Voß | Heer | Oberst | Commander of Grenadier-Regiment 585 | 28 October 1943* | Died of wounds 11 October 1943 | — |
| 315 | Herbert Otto Gille+ | Waffen-SS | SS-Brigadeführer and Generalmajor of the Waffen-SS | Commander of SS-Panzergrenadier-Division "Wiking" | 1 November 1943 | Awarded 47th Swords 20 February 1944; 12th Diamonds 19 April 1944 | Black-and-white portrait of an older man wearing a military uniform and an Iron Cross at his neck. He sits at a map table with a magnifying glass. |
| 316 | Albert Graf von der Goltz | Heer | Oberstleutnant of the Reserves | Leader of Gebirgsjäger-Regiment 144 | 2 November 1943 | — | Black-and-white portrait of a man in semi profile wearing a field cap, coat with binoculars suspended from his neck. He is holding a cigarette in his right hand. |
| 317 | Ernst Ziemer | Heer | Hauptmann | Chief of the 1./Grenadier-Regiment 94 | 2 November 1943 | — | — |
| 318 | Eugen König | Heer | Oberst | Commander of Grenadier-Regiment 451 | 4 November 1943 | — | — |
| 319 | Hermann Recknagel+ | Heer | Generalleutnant | Commander of the 111. Infanterie-Division | 6 November 1943 | Awarded 104th Swords 23 October 1944 | — |
| 320 | Siegfried Grabert | Heer | Hauptmann of the Reserves | Chief of the 8./Lehr-Regiment "Brandenburg" z.b.V. 800 | 6 November 1943* | Killed in action 25 July 1942 | A black-and-white photograph of a man wearing a military uniform, field cap and a neck order in shape of an Iron Cross standing in front of a tree. |
| 321 | Heinrich Kiesling | Heer | Major | Leader of Grenadier-Regiment 529 | 7 November 1943 | — | — |
| 322 | Otto von Knobelsdorff+ | Heer | General der Panzertruppe | Commanding general of the XXXXVIII. Panzerkorps | 12 November 1943 | Awarded 100th Swords 21 September 1944 | — |
| 323 | Maximilian de Angelis | Heer | General der Artillerie | Commanding general of the XXXXIV. Armeekorps | 12 November 1943 | — | — |
| 324 | Erich Brandenberger | Heer | General der Panzertruppe | Commanding general of the XXIX. Armeekorps | 12 November 1943 | — | — |
| 325 | Otto-Ernst Remer | Heer | Major | Commander of the I.(gepanzert)/Grenadier-Regiment (motorized) "Großdeutschland" | 12 November 1943 | — | Black-and-white portrait of a man in semi profile wearing a military uniform with various military decorations, his dark hair is parted and combed back. |
| 326 | Georg Christiansen | Kriegsmarine | Korvettenkapitän | Chief of the 1. Schnellbootsflottille | 13 November 1943 | — | — |
| 327 | Hans Dorr+ | Waffen-SS | SS-Hauptsturmführer | Commander of the I./SS-Panzergrenadier-Regiment "Germania" | 13 November 1943 | Awarded 77th Swords 9 July 1944 | — |
| 328 | Josef Heindl | Heer | Major of the Reserves | Leader of Grenadier-Regiment 199 "List" | 18 November 1943* | Killed in action 10 September 1943 | — |
| 329 | Willy Johannmeyer | Heer | Hauptmann | Commander of the II./Infanterie-Regiment 503 | 18 November 1943 | — | — |
| 330 | Dr. Ing. Karl-Friedrich Brill | Kriegsmarine | Fregattenkapitän of the Reserves | Commander of Minenschiff "Juminda" and leader of a Minenschiff group | 18 November 1943* | Killed in action 22 October 1943 | — |
| 331 | Johannes Block | Heer | Generalleutnant (Note: According to Scherzer as Generalmajor.) | Commander of the 294. Infanterie-Division | 22 November 1943 | — | |
| 332 | Hasso von Manteuffel+ | Heer | Generalmajor | Commander of 7. Panzer-Division | 23 November 1943 | Awarded 50th Swords 22 February 1944; 24th Diamonds 18 February 1945 | Black-and-white portrait of a man in semi profile wearing a peaked cap, military uniform with an Iron Cross and binoculars suspended from his neck. |
| 333 | Gotthard Heinrici+ | Heer | Generaloberst | Commander-in-chief of 4. Armee | 24 November 1943 | Awarded 136th Swords 3 March 1945 | Black-and-white portrait of a balding older man wearing a military uniform with an Iron Cross displayed at his neck. |
| 334 | Hans Schmidt | Heer | General der Infanterie (Note: According to Scherzer as Generalleutnant.) | Commanding general of the IX. Armeekorps | 24 November 1943 | — | — |
| 335 | Dr. med. dent. Karl Mauss+ | Heer | Oberst | Commander of Panzergrenadier-Regiment 33 | 24 November 1943 | Awarded 101st Swords 23 October 1944; 26th Diamonds 15 April 1945 | Mauss stands inside his vehicle on one of his daily trips to the front. |
| 336 | Hans-Henning Freiherr von Beust | Luftwaffe | Oberstleutnant | Geschwaderkommodore of Kampfgeschwader 27 "Boelcke" | 25 November 1943 | — | — |
| 337 | Dietrich Hrabak | Luftwaffe | Oberstleutnant | Geschwaderkommodore of Jagdgeschwader 52 | 25 November 1943 | — | |
| 338 | Wilhelm Lemke | Luftwaffe | Hauptmann | Gruppenkommandeur of the II./Jagdgeschwader 3 "Udet" (Note: According to Scherzer as Staffelkapitän in the III./Jagdgeschwader 3 "Udet".) | 25 November 1943 | — | — |
| 339 | Otto Schünemann | Heer | Generalleutnant | Commander of the 337. Infanterie-Division | 28 November 1943 | — | — |
| 340 | Walter Hartmann+ | Heer | Generalleutnant | Commander of the 87. Infanterie-Division | 30 November 1943 | Awarded 139th Swords 18 March 1945 | — |
| 341 | Ernst-August Fricke | Heer | Major | Commander of the II./Panzergrenadier-Regiment 76 (motorized) | 30 November 1943* | Died on 9 November 1943 of wounds sustained on 13 August 1943 | — |
| 342 | Ernst Wellmann | Heer | Oberstleutnant | Commander of Panzergrenadier-Regiment 3 (Note: According to Scherzer as commander of the I./Panzergrenadier-Regiment 3.) | 30 November 1943 | — | — |
| 343 | Alfred Druffner | Heer | Oberst | Commander of Grenadier-Regiment 519 | 30 November 1943* | Died of wounds 30 September 1943 | — |
| 344 | Anton Grasser | Heer | Generalleutnant | Commander of 25. Panzergrenadier-Division | 5 December 1943 | — | — |
| 345 | Kurt Walter | Heer | Oberstleutnant | Commander of Grenadier-Regiment 11 | 5 December 1943 | — | Black-and-white portrait of a man on the phone in semi profile wearing a military uniform with an Iron Cross displayed at his neck. He is holding a cigarette in his left hand. |
| 346 | Adolf Weitkunat | Heer | Major of the Reserves | Commander of Kampf-Bataillon 488 (remains of Grenadier-Regiment 488) | 5 December 1943 | — | — |
| 347 | Walter Elflein | Heer | Hauptmann of the Reserves | Commander of the I./Grenadier-Regiment 95 and leader of a Kampfgruppe in the 17. Infanterie-Division | 5 December 1943 | — | — |
| 348 | Willy Langkeit | Heer | Oberstleutnant | Commander of Panzer-Regiment 36 | 7 December 1943 | — | — |
| 349 | Andreas Thorey | Heer | Rittmeister | Commander of Aufklärungs-Abteilung 94 | 7 December 1943 | — | — |
| 350 | Sigfrid Henrici | Heer | General der Panzertruppe | Commanding general of the XXXX. Panzerkorps | 9 December 1943 | — | — |
| 351 | Heinrich Voigtsberger | Heer | Oberst | Commander of Grenadier-Regiment 60 (motorized) | 9 December 1943 | — | — |
| 352 | Karl Baacke | Heer | Oberstleutnant | Commander of Grenadier-Regiment 266 | 10 December 1943 | — | — |
| 353 | Christian Tychsen | Waffen-SS | SS-Sturmbannführer | Commander of the II./SS-Panzer-Regiment 2 "Das Reich" | 10 December 1943 | — | A black-and-white photograph of a man wearing a military uniform, peaked cap and a neck order in shape of an Iron Cross. His cap has an emblem in shape of a human skull and crossed bones. A large scar on his chin is visible. |
| 354 | Alfred Müller | Heer | Hauptmann | Commander of Sturmgeschütz-Abteilung 191 | 15 December 1943 | — | — |
| 355 | Hans-Joachim Kahler | Heer | Oberstleutnant | Commander of Panzergrenadier-Regiment 5 | 17 December 1943 | — | — |
| 356 | Dr. jur. Ernst Kühl | Luftwaffe | Oberst of the Reserves | Geschwaderkommodore of Kampfgeschwader 55 "Greif" | 18 December 1943 | — | |
| 357 | Kurt von der Chevallerie | Heer | General der Infanterie | Commanding general of the LIX. Armeekorps | 19 December 1943 | — | — |
| 358 | Wilhelm Schmalz | Luftwaffe | Oberst | Commander of Grenadier-Brigade z.b.V. of the Panzer-Division "Hermann Göring" | 23 December 1943 | — | |
| 359 | Albert Frey | Waffen-SS | SS-Obersturmbannführer | Commander of SS-Panzergrenadier-Regiment 1 "Leibstandarte SS Adolf Hitler" | 29 December 1943 (Note: According to Scherzer on 20 December 1943.) | — | — |
| 360 | Heinrich Ochs | Heer | Leutnant | Zugführer (platoon leader) in the 1./Panzer-Jäger-Abteilung 101 | 30 December 1943* | Killed in action 21 October 1943 | — |
