= LIX Army Corps =

Army formation of the Wehrmacht

The LIX Army Corps (German: LIX. Armeekorps), initially known as the Higher Command for Special Deployment LIX (German: Höheres Kommando z. b. V. LIX) was an army corps of the German Wehrmacht during World War II. The formation was active between 1940 and 1945.

== History ==
=== 1940 ===
The Höheres Kommando z. b. V. LIX was formed on 10 October 1940 in Lübeck. It was part of the 1st Army (Johannes Blaskowitz) under Army Group D (Erwin von Witzleben) between November 1940 and February 1941. The command served as part of the 7th Army (Friedrich Dollmann), still under Army Group D, between March 1941 and January 1942. The initial commander of the Höheres Kommando was Maximilian Schwandner. The corps was on occupation duty in occupied France for the three months of 1940 during which it existed.

=== 1941 ===
Throughout the year 1941, the LIX Army Corps continued to serve as an occupation force in France.

The command came under the leadership of Kurt von der Chevallerie on 28 December 1941.

=== 1942 ===
The Höheres Kommando was renamed LIX. Armeekorps on 20 January 1942, and transferred to the Eastern Front. The corps joined the Velikiye Luki and Velizh sectors.

The corps was moved to the 3rd Panzer Army (Georg-Hans Reinhardt) under Army Group Centre (Günther von Kluge) in February 1942, where it stayed until April. Between May 1942 and January 1943, the LIX Army Corps served directly under Army Group Centre. The corps was briefly under the command of Carl Hilpert between 22 June and 25 July, before Chevallerie returned to the command post of LIX Army Corps for a second term. Hilpert, after his tenure as acting commander of LIX Army Corps, would go on to command XXIII Army Corps and LIV Army Corps. The LIX Army Corps was known as Gruppe v. d. Chevallerie between November 1942 and January 1943.

In late November 1942, the Soviet 3rd Shock Army advanced towards and encircled Velikiye Luki and cut the LIX Army Corps into several parts during the Battle for Velikiye Luki. Hitler initially intended for the encircled city to be held and recaptured, but a counterattack by German forces failed by mid December.

=== 1943 ===
Velikiye Luki was captured by Soviet forces by 16 January 1943.

Between 17 January and 15 March 1943, the LIX Army Corps was under command of Erich Brandenberger, before Chevallerie returned to the command post for a third and final term. Between February and September 1943, the LIX Army Corps was once again part of 3rd Panzer Army. It was then moved to the 4th Panzer Army under Army Group South, where it remained between October 1943 and February 1944.

During the defensive battles of late 1943, the LIX Army Corps stood at the southern end of Army Group Centre (just north of Army Group South) and had to give way when the Soviet 13th Army and 60th Army broke through over Chernobyl, Korosten and Ovruch. The other corps that fought alongside LIX Army Corps as part of Hoth's 4th Panzer Army were the VII Army Corps and the XIII Army Corps. As VII Army Corps was forced back after Soviet victory at the Second Battle of Kiev on 13 November, LIX Army Corps was unable to stop the Soviet 60th Army from recapturing Korosten on 17 November. North of Korosten, a gap subsequently opened between the 4th Panzer Army and Army Group Centre, as the 2nd Army had retreated following the evacuation of Chernobyl.

The German forces attempted a counterattack to retake Kiev under the leadership of the XXXXVIII Panzer Corps (Hermann Balck). While the Germans were unable to retake the city itself due to the autumn mud, the front sector was temporarily stabilized. On 27 November, the LIX Army Corps led a successful attack on Korosten, the city which it had given up to the 60th Army ten days earlier.

=== 1944 ===
Starting in the end of January 1944, the 4th Panzer Army undertook a fighting retreat westwards through northern Ukraine. The gap that had opened between the 4th Panzer Army and Army Group Centre in November 1943 had now grown to over a hundred kilometers, a situation exacerbated by extensive partisan activity in the Pinsk Marshes. On 9 March 1944, some 18 Soviet Rifle Divisions, as well as 5 Armored/Mechanized Corps and a Cavalry Corps stood opposite to the 4th Panzer Army.

Between 8 February and 22 March 1944, the LIX Army Corps was under the command of Friedrich Schulz. After his tenure as acting commander of LIX Army Corps, Schulz would assume command of the XXXXVI Panzer Corps on 22 March 1944. The LIX Army Corps was moved to the 1st Panzer Army in March 1944, where it remained until July 1944. The 1st Panzer Army was part of Army Group South until March and was subsequently moved to Army Group North Ukraine in April.

The LIX Army Corps, under command of Edgar Röhricht between 22 March and 2 June, stayed under Army Group North Ukraine when it was moved from the 1st Panzer Army to the 17th Army in August 1944. The 17th Army, commanded by former LIX Army Corps commander Friedrich Schulz, was inserted by Army Group North Ukraine commander Josef Harpe on 23 July between the 1st and 4th Panzer Armies in a desperate attempt to prevent the army group's collapse. Between 2 June and 10 June, the corps was briefly commanded by Friedrich-Wilhelm Müller, before Röhricht returned to his post. On 15 July 1944, the LIX Army Corps consisted of the 1st and 208th Infantry Divisions and the 20th Hungarian Division. The LIX Army Corps stayed with the 17th Army until January 1945.

=== 1945 ===
Röhricht left his post, this time for good, on 29 January 1945. While Georg Ritter von Hengl was initially supposed to replace him, Joachim von Tresckow assumed command starting on 7 February 1945. He held that command until 10 April 1945, when he was replaced by Ernst Sieler. This would be the last transfer of command, as Sieler remained in office until German surrender on 8 May 1945.

In February 1945, the LIX Army Corps was moved a final time to the 1st Panzer Army and once again returned to the Army Group Centre.

== Structure ==
Organizational structure of the LIX (59th) Wehrmacht Army Corps between 1940 and 1945
Name	Year	Date	Corps Cdr	Subordinate Divisions	Army	Army Cdr	AG	AG Cdr	Operational area
Höh. Kom. z. b. V. LIX	1940	7 November	Schwandner	87th Infantry, 223rd Infantry	1st Army	Blaskowitz	D	von Witzleben	France
Höh. Kom. z. b. V. LIX	1940	12 December	Schwandner	87th Infantry, 223rd Infantry	1st Army	Blaskowitz	D	von Witzleben	France
Höh. Kom. z. b. V. LIX	1941	15 January	Schwandner	16th Infantry, 87th Infantry, 294th Infantry, SS Polizei Division	1st Army	Blaskowitz	D	von Witzleben	France
Höh. Kom. z. b. V. LIX	1941	10 February	Schwandner	16th Infantry, 87th Infantry, 294th Infantry, SS Polizei Division	1st Army	Blaskowitz	D	von Witzleben	France
Höh. Kom. z. b. V. LIX	1941	12 March	Schwandner	9th Infantry, 44th Infantry, 81st Infantry, 223rd Infantry, 246th Infantry	7th Army	Dollmann	D	von Witzleben	French Atlantic Coast
Höh. Kom. z. b. V. LIX	1941	5 April	Schwandner	81st Infantry, 223rd Infantry, 246th Infantry	7th Army	Dollmann	D	von Witzleben	French Atlantic Coast
Höh. Kom. z. b. V. LIX	1941	1 May	Schwandner	81st Infantry, 246th Infantry, 305th Infantry	7th Army	Dollmann	D	von Witzleben	French Atlantic Coast
Höh. Kom. z. b. V. LIX	1941	5 June	Schwandner	81st Infantry, 246th Infantry, 305th Infantry, 715th Infantry	7th Army	Dollmann	D	von Witzleben	French Atlantic Coast
Höh. Kom. z. b. V. LIX	1941	1 July	Schwandner	81st Infantry, 246th Infantry, 305th Infantry, 715th Infantry	7th Army	Dollmann	D	von Witzleben	French Atlantic Coast
Höh. Kom. z. b. V. LIX	1941	7 August	Schwandner	81st Infantry, 246th Infantry, 305th Infantry, 715th Infantry	7th Army	Dollmann	D	von Witzleben	French Atlantic Coast
Höh. Kom. z. b. V. LIX	1941	3 September	Schwandner	81st Infantry, 246th Infantry, 305th Infantry, 715th Infantry	7th Army	Dollmann	D	von Witzleben	French Atlantic Coast
Höh. Kom. z. b. V. LIX	1941	2 October	Schwandner	81st Infantry, 246th Infantry, 305th Infantry, 715th Infantry	7th Army	Dollmann	D	von Witzleben	French Atlantic Coast
Höh. Kom. z. b. V. LIX	1941	4 November	Schwandner	81st Infantry, 246th Infantry, 305th Infantry, 715th Infantry	7th Army	Dollmann	D	von Witzleben	French Atlantic Coast
Höh. Kom. z. b. V. LIX	1941	4 December	Schwandner	81st Infantry, 246th Infantry, 305th Infantry, 715th Infantry	7th Army	Dollmann	D	von Witzleben	French Atlantic Coast
Höh. Kom. z. b. V. LIX	1942	2 January	von der Chevallerie	22nd Panzer, 246th Infantry, 305th Infantry, 327th Infantry, 715th Infantry	7th Army	Dollmann	D	von Witzleben	French Atlantic Coast
LIX. Armeekorps	1942	6 February	von der Chevallerie	330th Infantry	3rd Panzer Army	Reinhardt	Centre	von Kluge	Velikiye Luki / Velizh
LIX. Armeekorps	1942	10 March	von der Chevallerie	83rd Infantry, 205th Infantry, 330th Infantry	3rd Panzer Army	Reinhardt	Centre	von Kluge	Velikiye Luki / Velizh
LIX. Armeekorps	1942	5 April	von der Chevallerie	83rd Infantry, 205th Infantry, 330th Infantry	3rd Panzer Army	Reinhardt	Centre	von Kluge	Velikiye Luki / Velizh
LIX. Armeekorps	1942	May	von der Chevallerie	Various	directly under army group		Centre	von Kluge	Velikiye Luki / Velizh
LIX. Armeekorps	1942	June	von der Chevallerie	Various	directly under army group		Centre	von Kluge	Velikiye Luki / Velizh
LIX. Armeekorps	1942	July	Hilpert	Various	directly under army group		Centre	von Kluge	Velikiye Luki / Velizh
LIX. Armeekorps	1942	August	von der Chevallerie	Various	directly under army group		Centre	von Kluge	Velikiye Luki / Velizh
LIX. Armeekorps	1942	September	von der Chevallerie	Various	directly under army group		Centre	von Kluge	Velikiye Luki / Velizh
LIX. Armeekorps	1942	October	von der Chevallerie	Various	directly under army group		Centre	von Kluge	Velikiye Luki / Velizh
LIX. Armeekorps	1942	November	von der Chevallerie	Various	directly under army group		Centre	von Kluge	Velikiye Luki / Velizh
LIX. Armeekorps	1942	December	von der Chevallerie	Various	directly under army group		Centre	von Kluge	Velikiye Luki / Velizh
LIX. Armeekorps	1943	January	von der Chevallerie	Various	directly under army group		Centre	von Kluge	Velikiye Luki / Velizh
LIX. Armeekorps	1943	3 February	Brandenberger	205th Infantry, 291st Infantry, 331st Infantry, SS Br. 1, Free Corps Denmark	3rd Panzer Army	Reinhardt	Centre	von Kluge	Velikiye Luki / Velizh
LIX. Armeekorps	1943	4 March	Brandenberger	263rd Infantry, 291st Infantry, SS Br. 1	3rd Panzer Army	Reinhardt	Centre	von Kluge	Velikiye Luki / Velizh
LIX. Armeekorps	1943	9 April	von der Chevallerie	263rd Infantry, 291st Infantry, SS Br. 1	3rd Panzer Army	Reinhardt	Centre	von Kluge	Velikiye Luki / Velizh
LIX. Armeekorps	1943	1 May	von der Chevallerie	263rd Infantry, 291st Infantry, SS Br. 1	3rd Panzer Army	Reinhardt	Centre	von Kluge	Velikiye Luki / Velizh
LIX. Armeekorps	1943	1 June	von der Chevallerie	263rd Infantry, 291st Infantry, SS Br. 1	3rd Panzer Army	Reinhardt	Centre	von Kluge	Velikiye Luki / Velizh
LIX. Armeekorps	1943	7 July	von der Chevallerie	263rd Infantry, 291st Infantry	3rd Panzer Army	Reinhardt	Centre	von Kluge	Velikiye Luki / Velizh
LIX. Armeekorps	1943	5 August	von der Chevallerie	263rd Infantry, 291st Infantry	3rd Panzer Army	Reinhardt	Centre	von Kluge	Velikiye Luki / Velizh
LIX. Armeekorps	1943	5 September	von der Chevallerie	263rd Infantry, 291st Infantry	3rd Panzer Army	Reinhardt	Centre	von Kluge	Velikiye Luki / Velizh
LIX. Armeekorps	1943	4 October	von der Chevallerie	8th Panzer, 183rd Infantry, 217th Infantry, 291st Infantry, 339th Infantry	4th Panzer Army	Hoth	South	von Manstein	Kiev / Zhytomyr
LIX. Armeekorps	1943	8 November	von der Chevallerie	291st Infantry, Division C	4th Panzer Army	Hoth	South	von Manstein	Kiev / Zhytomyr
LIX. Armeekorps	1943	3 December	von der Chevallerie	291st Infantry, Division C	4th Panzer Army	Raus	South	von Manstein	Kiev / Zhytomyr
LIX. Armeekorps	1944	1 January	von der Chevallerie	147th Infantry, 291st Infantry, 454th Infantry, Division C	4th Panzer Army	Raus	South	von Manstein	Vinnytsia
LIX. Armeekorps	1944	1 February	von der Chevallerie	96th Infantry, 291st Infantry	4th Panzer Army	Raus	South	von Manstein	Vinnytsia
LIX. Armeekorps	1944	3 March	Schulz	27th SS, 6th Panzer, 19th Panzer, 96th Infantry, 291st Infantry, SSR	1st Panzer Army	Raus	South	von Manstein	Kamianets-Podilskyi
LIX. Armeekorps	1944	15 April	Röhricht	1st Panzer, 7th Panzer, 25th Panzer, 20th Infantry, 291st Infantry, 371st Infantry	1st Panzer Army	Raus	North Ukraine	Model	Brody
LIX. Armeekorps	1944	15 May	Röhricht	82nd Infantry, 208th Infantry, 254th Infantry, 291st Infantry, 20th Hungarian	1st Panzer Army	Raus	North Ukraine	Model	Brody
LIX. Armeekorps	1944	15 June	Röhricht	208th Infantry, 254th Infantry, 20th Hungarian	1st Panzer Army	Raus	North Ukraine	Model	Brody
LIX. Armeekorps	1944	15 July	Röhricht	1st Infantry, 208th Infantry, 20th Hungarian	1st Panzer Army	Raus	North Ukraine	Model	Brody
LIX. Armeekorps	1944	31 August	Röhricht	8th Panzer, 24th Panzer, 18th SS, 359th Infantry, 371st Infantry	17th Army	Schulz	North Ukraine	Harpe	San, Wisłoka
LIX. Armeekorps	1944	16 September	Röhricht	359th Infantry, 371st Infantry	17th Army	Schulz	North Ukraine	Harpe	San, Wisłoka
LIX. Armeekorps	1944	13 October	Röhricht	359th Infantry, 371st Infantry, 544th Infantry	17th Army	Schulz	North Ukraine	Harpe	Kraków
LIX. Armeekorps	1944	5 November	Röhricht	359th Infantry, 371st Infantry, 544th Infantry	17th Army	Schulz	North Ukraine	Harpe	Kraków
LIX. Armeekorps	1944	26 November	Röhricht	359th Infantry, 371st Infantry, 544th Infantry	17th Army	Schulz	North Ukraine	Harpe	Kraków
LIX. Armeekorps	1944	31 December	Röhricht	359th Infantry, 371st Infantry, 544th Infantry	17th Army	Schulz	North Ukraine	Harpe	Kraków
LIX. Armeekorps	1945	19 February	von Tresckow	68th Infantry, 75th Infantry, 253rd Infantry, 359th Infantry, 544th Infantry	1st Panzer Army	Heinrici	Centre	Schörner	Loslau, Oderberg
LIX. Armeekorps	1945	1 March	von Tresckow	68th Infantry, 75th Infantry, 253rd Infantry, 544th Infantry	1st Panzer Army	Heinrici	Centre	Schörner	Loslau, Oderberg
LIX. Armeekorps	1945	12 April	Sieler	16th Panzer, 19th Panzer, 544th Infantry, 715th Infantry, 4th Mountain	1st Panzer Army	Nehring	Centre	Schörner	Loslau, Oderberg
LIX. Armeekorps	1945	5 May	Sieler	Panzergrenadier Division "Brandenburg"	1st Panzer Army	Nehring	Centre	Schörner	Loslau, Oderberg

== Noteworthy individuals ==
- Maximilian Schwandner, first corps commander between 16 October 1940 and 28 December 1941.
- Kurt von der Chevallerie, second, fourth and sixth corps commander between 28 December 1941 and 22 June 1942, between 25 July 1942 and 17 January 1943 and between 15 March 1943 and 4 February 1944.
- Carl Hilpert, third (acting) corps commander between 22 June 1942 and 25 July 1942.
- Erich Brandenberger, fifth corps commander between 17 January 1943 and 15 March 1943.
- Friedrich Schulz, seventh (acting) corps commander between 8 February 1944 and 22 March 1944.
- Edgar Röhricht, eighth and tenth corps commander between 22 March 1944 and 2 June 1944 and between 10 June 1944 and 29 January 1945.
- Friedrich-Wilhelm Müller, ninth corps commander between 2 June 1944 and 10 June 1944.
- Georg Ritter von Hengl, eleventh corps commander between 29 January 1945 and 7 February 1945.
- Joachim von Tresckow, twelfth corps commander between 7 February 1945 and 10 April 1945.
- Ernst Sieler, thirteenth and final corps commander between 10 April and 8 May 1945.
