= XXXIX Panzer Corps =

XXXIX. Panzerkorps
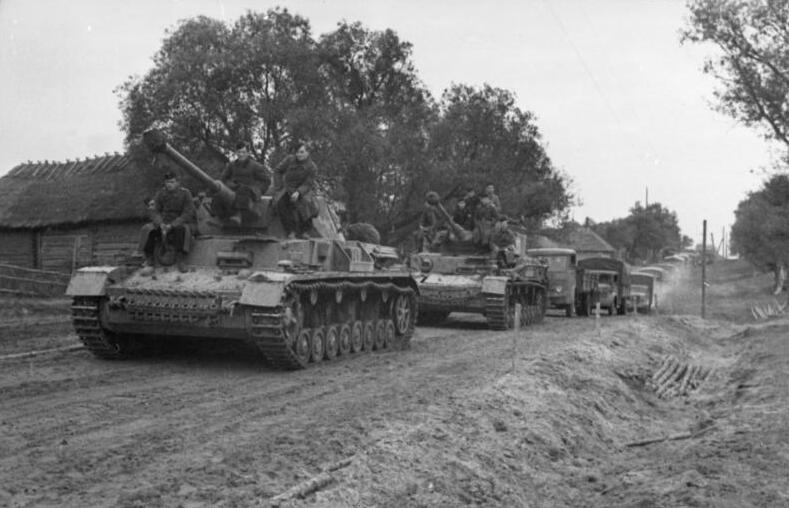
- Active: 27 January 1940 – May 1945
- Country: Nazi Germany
- Branch: Army
- Type: Panzer corps
- Role: Armoured warfare
- Size: Corps
- Engagements: World War II: Western Front; Invasion of France; Battle of the Bulge; Eastern Front; Battle of Minsk; Battle of Smolensk; Cholm; Rzhev salient; Defence of Smolensk; Orsha; Mogilev; Operation Bagration; Operation Doppelkopf; Courland pocket; Gumbinnen Operation; East Pomeranian Offensive; Küstrin

Commanders
- Notable commanders: General Dietrich von Saucken

The XXXIX Panzer Corps (German: XXXIX. Panzerkorps, also previously designated the XXXIX. Armeekorps (mot)) was a German panzer corps which saw action on the Western and Eastern Fronts during World War II.

== Operational history ==
The Corps whose home station was formed (as the XXXIX Army Corps) on 13 May 1940 shortly after the German Invasion of France and was originally assigned to the 18th Army under von Kuchler. After the British evacuation from Dunkirk, it was assigned to Group Guderian, the 2nd and 1st Armies. In June 1941 the Corps was assigned to Army Group Centre for Operation Barbarossa, Nazi Germany's invasion of the Soviet Union. It initially attacked towards Vilnius and then took part in the first Battle of Minsk. By August, it was assigned to Army Group North for the attack on Leningrad.

In 9 July 1942 the Corps was reorganised as the XXXIX Panzer Corps. It was shifted to the Rzhev salient, under the 9th Army of Army Group Centre, where it was involved in Battle of Rzhev in the summer of 1942. Army Group Centre evacuated the Rzhev salient early in 1943. During the autumn, the Corps took part in the defence against Operation Suvorov, withdrawing to positions east of Mogilev.

During June 1944 the XXXIX Panzer Corps took part in the defence against the Soviet summer offensive, Operation Bagration; covering the strategically important highway through Mogilev, it was one of the strongest corps in the Army Group at the time, with four high-quality divisions. Soviet breakthroughs to the north and south saw the Corps threatened with encirclement within a matter of days, while the 12th Infantry Division was encircled in Mogilev and destroyed. The corps commander, General Robert Martinek was killed on 28 June and his replacement Otto Schünemann, was killed the following day. The Corps disintegrated at the Berezina River crossings as its columns attempted to cross the river under heavy air attack; nearly all its units were destroyed by the 2nd Belorussian Front in the subsequent encirclement east of Minsk. The commanders of the 110th, 12th, 31st and Feldherrnhalle Divisions, Kurowski, Bamler, Ochsner, and Steinkeller respectively, were all captured.

The Corps was reformed by redesignating Gruppe von Saucken, composed of ad hoc battle groups along with the 5th Panzer Division and commanded by Dietrich von Saucken. Renamed XXXIX Panzer Corps, it fought for the control of Minsk and then retreated in the face of the subsequent stages of the Soviet strategic offensive through Belarus, Poland and Lithuania, being pushed back into the Courland Pocket. During this period, the rebuilt Corps was reinforced with the 4th and 12th Panzer Divisions as well as the Panzergrenadier Division Großdeutschland, taking part in Operation Doppelkopf. Late in the year it was redeployed to East Prussia before being reorganised and withdrawn for use in the Ardennes Offensive. It was assigned to Hasso von Manteuffel's 5th Panzer Army.

After the defeat of the Ardennes offensive in the Battle of the Bulge, the Corps was redeployed against the Soviet offensives in Pomerania as part of the newly organised 11th SS Panzer Army, Army Group Vistula. It was employed in Operation Solstice, the failed counter-offensive at Stargard against the spearheads of the 1st Belorussian Front. On 27 March the Corps was thrown into a disastrous counter-attack to relieve the fortress of Küstrin, and was almost entirely destroyed.

== Commanders ==
- Generaloberst Rudolf Schmidt (1 February 1940 – 10 November 1941)
- Generaloberst Hans-Jürgen von Arnim (11 November 1941 – 30 November 1942)
- General der Artillerie Robert Martinek (1 December 1942 – 13 November 1943)
- General der Infanterie Carl Püchler (13 November 1943 – 18 April 1944)
- General der Artillerie Robert Martinek (18 April 1944 – 28 June 1944) - KIA
- Generalleutnant Otto Schünemann (28 June 1944 – 29 June 1944) - KIA
- General der Panzertruppe Dietrich von Saucken (29 June 1944 – 15 October 1944)
- General der Panzertruppe Karl Decker (15 October 1944 – 21 April 1945)
- Generalleutnant Karl Arndt (21 April 1945 – 8 May 1945)

== Orders of battle ==
- May 1940
  - 208th infantry division
  - 225th infantry division
- June 1941
  - 14th Infantry Division
  - 20th Infantry Division
  - 7th Panzer Division
  - 20th Panzer Division
- October 1942
  - 78th Infantry Division
  - 102nd Infantry Division
  - 1st Panzer Division
  - 5th Panzer Division
- June 1944
  - 12th Infantry Division
  - 31st Infantry Division
  - 110th Infantry Division
  - 337th Infantry Division
  - Panzergrenadier Division Feldherrnhalle (reserve)
- 27 March 1945 – Küstrin Counterattack
  - Korps Stab
    - Arko 140
    - Korps-Nachrichten-Abteilung 439
    - Korps-Nachschub-Truppen 439
    - Ost-Bataillon 439
    - schwere-SS-Panzer-Abteilung 502
    - Kampfgruppe 1001 Nachtes
  - Panzer-Division Müncheberg
  - 20.Panzergrenadier-Division
  - 25.Panzergrenadier-Division
  - Führer-Grenadier-Division
