= Kurt von der Chevallerie =

German general (1891–1945)

- Born: 23 December 1891; Berlin, Province of Brandenburg, German Empire
- Died: 18 April 1945 (aged 53); MIA Kolberg region, Farther Pomerania, German Reich
- Relatives: Hellmut von der Chevallerie (brother)
- Military career
- Allegiance: German Empire; Weimar Republic; Nazi Germany
- Branch: Prussian Army; Imperial German Army; Freikorps; Reichswehr; German Army
- Service years: 1910–1945
- Rank: General der Infanterie
- Commands: 83rd Infantry Division; 99th Infantry Division; LIX Army Corps; 1st Army
- Conflicts: World War I; World War II; Annexation of the Sudetenland; Battle of France; Operation Barbarossa; Battle of Kiev (1941); Battle for Velikiye Luki (1943); Lower Dnieper Offensive; Hube's Pocket; Siegfried Line Campaign
- Awards: Knight's Cross of the Iron Cross with Oak Leaves

Kurt von der Chevallerie (23 December 1891 – missing as of 18 April 1945) was a German general in the Wehrmacht during World War II who commanded the German 1st Army. He was a recipient of the Knight's Cross of the Iron Cross with Oak Leaves. Chevallerie retired from the Army on 31 January 1945.

== Death ==
Despite his retirement, von der Chavallerie disappeared during the Soviet invasion of East Prussia and Pomerania and is listed missing in action near Kolberg since 18 April 1945.

== See also ==
- List of people who disappeared

== Promotions ==
- 24 February 1910 Fahnenjunker (Officer Candidate)
- 24 May 1910 Fahnenjunker-Gefreiter (Officer Candidate with Lance Corporal rank)
- 24 June 1910 Fahnenjunker-Unteroffizier (Officer Candidate with Corporal/NCO/Junior Sergeant rank)
- 18 October 1910 Fähnrich (Officer Cadet)
- 18 August 1911 Leutnant (2nd Lieutenant) with Patent from 20 August 1909
- 18 August 1915 Oberleutnant (1st Lieutenant)
- 20 September 1918 Hauptmann (Captain)
  - 1 October 1928 renamed to Rittmeister when transferred to the cavalry
- 1 February 1931 Major with Rank Seniority (RDA) from 1 February 1929 (29)
- 1 August 1933 Oberstleutnant (Lieutenant Colonel)
- 1 July 1935 Oberst (Colonel)
- 28 February 1939 Generalmajor (Major General) with effect and Rank Seniority (RDA) from 1 March 1939
- 17 December 1940 Generalleutnant (Lieutenant General) with effect and Rank Seniority (RDA) from 1 January 1941
- 24 January 1942 General der Infanterie (General of the Infantry) with effect from 1 February 1942
  - 28 February 1942 received Rank Seniority (RDA) from 1 March 1942 (5)

== Awards and decorations ==
- Iron Cross (1914), 2nd and 1st Class
  - 2nd Class (1 October 1914)
  - 1st Class (12 December 1915)
- Austria-Hungary Military Merit Cross, 3rd Class with War Decoration (1917)
- Wound Badge in Black (3 March 1918)
- Cross of Honour of the Princely House Order of Hohenzollern, 3rd Class with Swords (22 July 1918)
- Honour Cross of the World War 1914/1918 with Swords (1935)
- Wehrmacht Long Service Award, 4th to 1st Class
- Commanders Cross of the Hungarian Order of Merit (12 February 1939)
- Sudetenland Medal
- Clasp to the Iron Cross (1939), 2nd and 1st Class on 12 June 1940
- Grand Officer of the Order of the Crown of Italy (27 August 1940)
- Eastern Front Medal (1 September 1942)
- Wound Badge (1939) in Black (16 January 1943)
- Knight's Cross of the Iron Cross with Oak Leaves
  - Knight's Cross on 23 October 1941 as Generalleutnant and Commander of the 99th Light Infantry Division
  - Oak Leaves on 19 December 1943 as General of the Infantry and Commanding General of the LIX Army Corps

Military offices
Preceded by none	Commander of 83. Infanterie-Division; 1 December 1939 – 10 December 1940	Succeeded by Generalleutnant Alexander von Zülow
Preceded by none	Commander of 99. leichte Infanterie-Division; 10 December 1940 – October 1941	Succeeded by Reclassified as 7. Gebirgs Division
Preceded by None	Commander of LIX. Armeekorps; 20 January 1942 – 26 June 1942	Succeeded by Generalleutnant Carl Hilpert
Preceded by Generalleutnant Carl Hilpert	Commander of LIX. Armeekorps; 25 July 1942 – 17 January 1943	Succeeded by General der Panzertruppe Erich Brandenberger
Preceded by General der Panzertruppe Erich Brandenberger	Commander of LIX. Armeekorps; 15 March 1943 – 4 February 1944	Succeeded by General der Infanterie Friedrich Schulz
Preceded by General der Panzertruppe Joachim Lemelsen	Commander of 1. Armee; 4 June 1944 – 5 September 1944	Succeeded by General der Panzertruppe Otto von Knobelsdorff
