= August Krakau =

German general in the Wehrmacht (1894-1975)

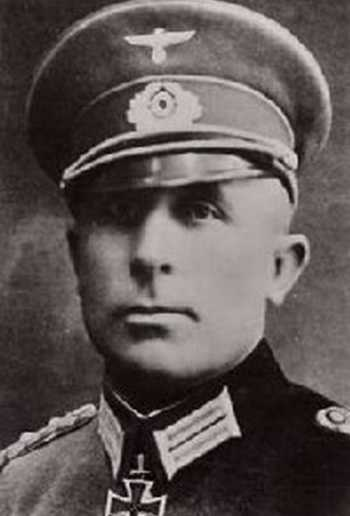
- Born: 12 September 1894; Pirmasens, Palatinate
- Died: 7 January 1975 (aged 80); Amberg, Bavaria
- Military career
- Allegiance: Nazi Germany
- Branch: Army
- Rank: Generalleutnant
- Commands: 7th Mountain Division
- Conflicts: World War II
- Awards: Knight's Cross of the Iron Cross

August Krakau (September 12, 1894 – January 7, 1975) was a German general in the Wehrmacht during World War II who commanded the 7th Mountain Division. He was a recipient of the Knight's Cross of the Iron Cross of Nazi Germany.

== Awards and decorations ==
- Knight's Cross of the Iron Cross on 21 June 1941 as Oberst and commander of Gebirgsjäger-Regiment 85

Military offices
| Preceded by General der Artillerie Robert Martinek | Commander of 7 Gebirgs Division; 1 May 1942 - 22 July 1942 | Succeeded by General der Artillerie Robert Martinek |
| Preceded by General der Artillerie Robert Martinek | Commander of 7 Gebirgs Division; 10 September 1942 - 8 May 1945 | Succeeded by None |
