= Erich Brandenberger =

German general

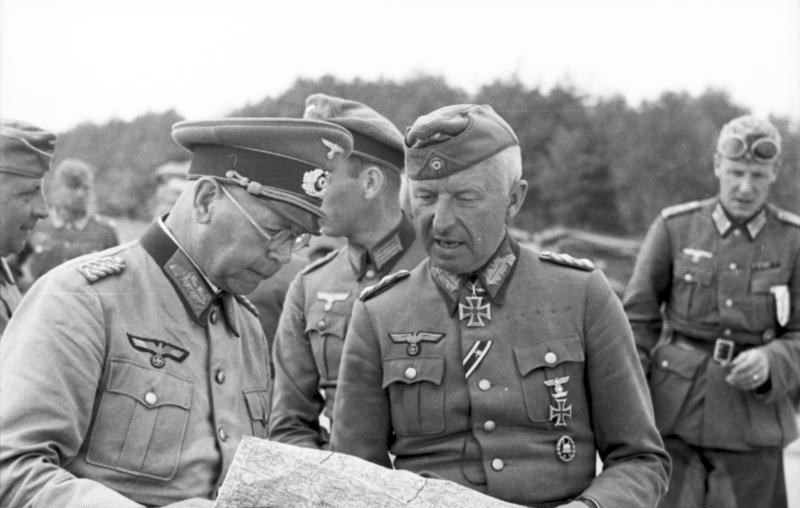
- Erich Brandenberger (left) with Erich von Manstein in the Soviet Union, 1941
- Born: 15 July 1892; Augsburg, German Empire
- Died: 21 June 1955 (aged 62); Bonn, West Germany
- Military career
- Allegiance: German Empire; Weimar Republic; Nazi Germany
- Branch: German Army
- Service years: 1911–1945
- Rank: General der Panzertruppe
- Commands: 8th Panzer Division; XXIX Army Corps
- Conflicts: World War I World War II
- Awards: Knight's Cross of the Iron Cross with Oak Leaves

Erich Brandenberger (15 July 1892 – 21 June 1955) was a German general in the Wehrmacht of Nazi Germany during World War II. He was a recipient of the Knight's Cross of the Iron Cross with Oak Leaves.

== Biography ==
In World War I Brandenberger served as an officer in the 6th Bavarian Field Artillery Regiment. He started World War II as Chief of the General Staff of the XXIII Army Corps (16 September 1939 - 15 February 1941) on the Westwall. He commanded 8th Panzer Division (20 February 1941 - 16 January 1943), LIX Army Corps (January — March 1943) and XXIX Army Corps (November 1943 - Jun 1944) on the Eastern Front.

In late 1944 and early 1945, Brandenberger led the 7th Army on the Western Front during the German Ardennes Offensive. He surrendered to the American forces commanded by Edward H. Brooks on 6 May 1945 as the commander of 19th Army in Innsbruck. He was interned until 1948.

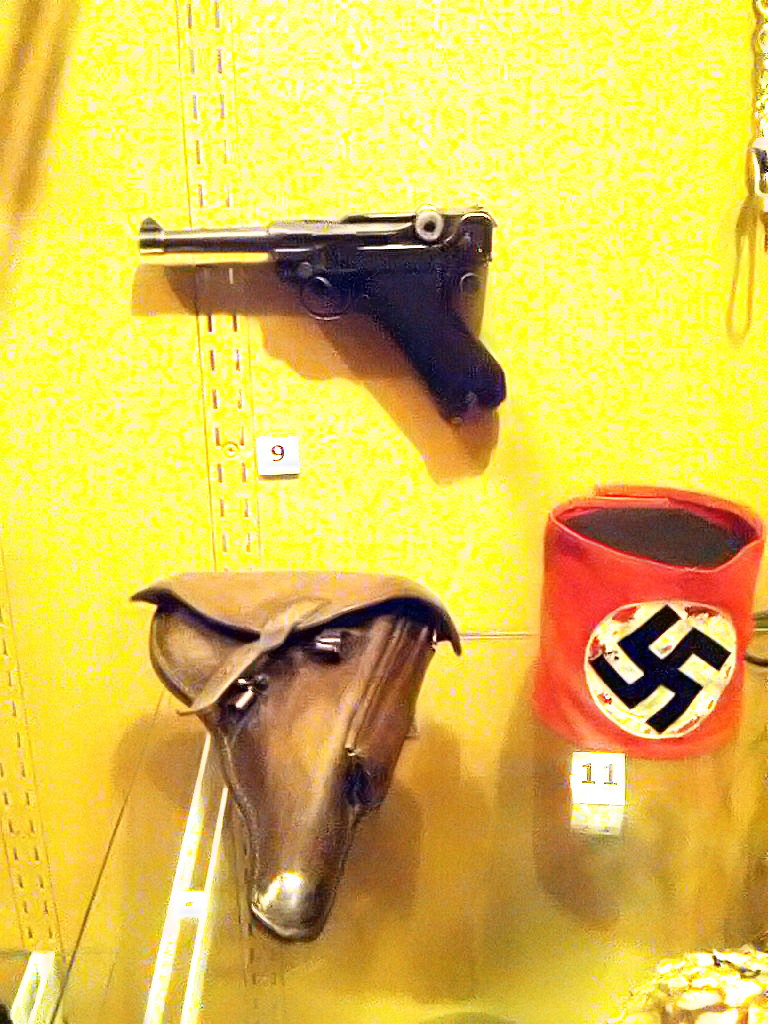
Luger pistol surrendered by Brandenberger to Brooks, currently in the collection of the Sullivan Museum and History Center, Norwich University.

== Awards ==
- Iron Cross (1914) 2nd Class (21 October 1914) & 1st Class (7 September 1916)
- Clasp to the Iron Cross 2nd Class (24 December 1939) & 1st Class (15 May 1940)
- Knight's Cross of the Iron Cross with Oak Leaves
  - Knight's Cross on 15 July 1941 as Generalmajor and commander of the 8. Panzer-Division
  - Oak Leaves on 12 November 1943 as General der Panzertruppe and commander of the XXIX. Armeekorps

== Sources ==
- Scherzer, Veit (2007). Die Ritterkreuzträger 1939–1945 Die Inhaber des Ritterkreuzes des Eisernen Kreuzes 1939 von Heer, Luftwaffe, Kriegsmarine, Waffen-SS, Volkssturm sowie mit Deutschland verbündeter Streitkräfte nach den Unterlagen des Bundesarchives [The Knight's Cross Bearers 1939–1945 The Holders of the Knight's Cross of the Iron Cross 1939 by Army, Air Force, Navy, Waffen-SS, Volkssturm and Allied Forces with Germany According to the Documents of the Federal Archives] (in German). Jena, Germany: Scherzers Militaer-Verlag. ISBN 978-3-938845-17-2.
- Thomas, Franz (1997). Die Eichenlaubträger 1939–1945 Band 1: A–K [The Oak Leaves Bearers 1939–1945 Volume 1: A–K] (in German). Osnabrück, Germany: Biblio-Verlag. ISBN 978-3-7648-2299-6.

Military offices
Preceded by General der Infanterie Kurt von der Chevallerie	Commander of LIX Army Corps; 17 January 1943 - 15 March 1943	Succeeded by General der Infanterie Kurt von der Chevallerie
Preceded by General der Infanterie Hans von Obstfelder	Commander of XXIX Army Corps; May 1943 – 30 June 1944	Succeeded by Generalleutnant Anton Bechtolsheim
Preceded by General der Infanterie Wilhelm Schneckenburger	Commander of XVII Army Corps; 1 August 1943 – 1 November 1943	Succeeded by General der Gebirgstruppen Hans Kreysing
Preceded by General Heinrich Eberbach	Commander of 7th Army; 3 September 1944 – 21 February 1945	Succeeded by General Hans Felber
Preceded by General der Infanterie Hans von Obstfelder	Commander of 19th Army; March 1945 – April 1945	Succeeded by disbanded
