= 7th Mountain Division (Wehrmacht) =

- 7. Gebirgs-Division
- Unit insignia
- Active: 1941–1945
- Country: Nazi Germany
- Branch: German Army
- Type: Gebirgsjäger
- Role: Mountain warfare
- Size: Division
- Part of: XXXVI Mountain Corps
- Nickname(s): Bergschuh Division
- Engagements: World War II

Commanders
- Notable commanders: Robert Martinek

Insignia
- Identification symbol: Edelweiss; Mountain boot

The 7th Mountain Division (German: 7. Gebirgs Division) was formed through the redesignation of 99th Light Infantry Division, which had fought on the southern sector of the Eastern Front until being withdrawn to Germany in October 1941. In 1942, it was sent to Finland and remained there until the Finnish withdrawal from the war. The Division retreated into Norway where it remained until the end of the War.

== Commanders ==
- General der Gebirgstruppe Rudolf Konrad (1 November 1941 – 19 December 1941)
- Generalmajor Wilhelm Weiß (19 December 1941 – 1 January 1942)
- General der Artillerie Robert Martinek (1 January 1942 – 1 May 1942)
- Generalleutnant August Krakau (1 May 1942 – 22 July 1942)
- General der Artillerie Robert Martinek (22 July 1942 – 10 September 1942)
- Generalleutnant August Krakau (10 September 1942 – 8 May 1945)

== Order of battle ==
- 206. Gebirgsjäger Regiment
  - 1. Battalion
  - 2. Battalion
  - 3. Battalion
  - Mountain Panzerjäger Company (mot)
- 218. Gebirgsjäger Regiment
  - 1. Battalion
  - 2. Battalion
  - 3. Battalion
  - Mountain Panzerjäger Company (mot)
- 99. Panzerjäger Battalion
- 99. Reconnaissance Battalion
- 79. Mountain Artillery Regiment
  - 1. Battalion
  - 2. Battalion
  - 3. Battalion
  - 4. Battalion
- 99. Mountain Pioneer Battalion
- 99. Mountain Signals Battalion
- 54. Mountain Feldersatz Battalion
- 54. Ski Battalion
- 99. Supply Troops

== Finnish auxiliaries ==
In spring of 1944, the Division controlled several Finnish units that supported it. These were:

  - Frontier Battalions 7 and 8
  - Independent Battalions 8 and 11
  - Mortar Company 11
  - Gun Company 48
  - Light Artillery Battalion 17
  - Independent Armoured Car Platoons 7 and 9
