= Otto Schünemann =

German general

- Born: 6 October 1891
- Died: 29 June 1944 (aged 52); Mogilev, Soviet Union
- Military career
- Allegiance: German Empire; Weimar Republic; Nazi Germany
- Branch: Army (Wehrmacht)
- Service years: 1908–1920; 1936–1944
- Rank: Generalleutnant
- Commands: 337th Infantry Division; XXXIX Panzer Corps
- Conflicts: World War I World War II: Battle of France; Operation Barbarossa; Battle of Smolensk (1941); Battles of Rzhev; Operation Büffel; Battle of Smolensk (1943); Operation Bagration; Minsk Offensive †
- Awards: Knight's Cross of the Iron Cross with Oak Leaves

Otto Schünemann (6 October 1891 – 29 June 1944) was a German general during World War II. He was a recipient of the Knight's Cross of the Iron Cross with Oak Leaves. Schünemann was killed on 29 June 1944 near Mogilev during the Soviet 1944 summer offensive, Operation Bagration by a Soviet air attack on the Belynitschi-Beresino road.

== Awards and decorations ==
- Clasp to the Iron Cross (1939) 2nd Class (28 May 1940) & 1st Class (18 June 1940)
- German Cross in Gold on 11 February 1943 as Generalmajor and commander of the 337. Infanterie-Division
- Knight's Cross of the Iron Cross with Oak Leaves
  - Knight's Cross on 20 December 1941 as Oberst and commander of Infanterie-Regiment 184
  - Oak Leaves on 28 November 1943 as Generalleutnant and commander of the 337. Infanterie-Division

Military offices
Preceded by General der Artillerie Erich Marcks	Commander of 337. Infanterie-Division; 5 October 1942 – 27 December 1943	Succeeded by Generalleutnant Walter Scheller
Preceded by General der Artillerie Robert Martinek	Commander of XXXIX. Panzer-Korps; 28 June 1944 – 29 June 1944	Succeeded by General der Panzertruppe Dietrich von Saucken
