= XXIX Army Corps (Wehrmacht) =

- Active: May 1940–May 1945
- Country: Nazi Germany
- Branch: Army
- Size: Corps
- Engagements: World War II: Battle of Kiev; Battle of Stalingrad; Battle of the Dnieper; Odessa Offensive; Jassy–Kishinev Offensive

Commanders
- Notable commanders: Hans von Obstfelder; Erich Brandenburger

The XXIX Army Corps (German: XXIX. Armeekorps) was an infantry corps of the German Army during World War II, active from 1940 to 1945.

== Operational history ==
The corps was formed on 20 May 1940 in Wehrkreis IV with a home station at Naumburg, which was changed to Bautzen on 8 June. It was initially part of the Oberkommando des Heeres Reserve, becoming part of 9th Army of Army Group A in northern France by July. It transferred to the 17th Army of Army Group B in the General Government during March and April 1941 in preparation for Operation Barbarossa, the German invasion of the Soviet Union. The corps transferred to the 6th Army with Army Group B in May, fighting with the army as part of Army Group South when the invasion began on 22 June. It Included the 111th, 299th, and 56th Infantry Divisions on 1 May. The corps participated in actions along the Bug River, the Battle of Kiev, and at Belgorod between June and December, continuing to fight at Belgorod until July 1942. In August the corps was transferred to the reserve of Army Group B, then assigned to the 8th Italian Army of the army group between September and December, fighting on the Don River during the Battle of Stalingrad.

Following the destruction of the 8th Italian Army the corps was assigned to Army Detachment Hollidt in January 1943, fighting on the Don and the Donets until February with Army Group Don. The XXIX Army Corps continued to serve with Army Detachment Hollidt on the Mius-Front in March, part of Army Group South. It transferred to the recreated 6th Army in April, and retreated during the Battle of the Dnieper in October with the army as part of Army Group A. The corps fought on the Dnieper and at Krivoi Rog from November as part of the 1st Panzer Army, transferring back to the 6th Army in January 1944. The 6th Army transferred back to Army Group A along with the corps in March as it retreated southwest to Uman, fighting against the Soviet Uman–Botoșani Offensive.

With Army Group South Ukraine the corps and 6th Army retreated to the Bug and the Dniester during April and May. In June and July it held positions around Kishinev as part of the Romanian 3rd Army, retreating into Transylvania during the Jassy–Kishinev Offensive as part of 6th Army in August. After 6th Army was destroyed the corps was directly assigned to Army Group South Ukraine in September, then retreated into Upper Hungary with the 8th Army of Army Group South in October. Between January and March it fought on the Hron, and in April rejoined 1st Panzer Army as part of Army Group Centre in Moravia, surrendering there at the end of the war.

== Corps commanders ==
- From May 20, 1940 - infantry general Hans von Obstfelder
- From May 21, 1943 - General of the tank forces Erich Brandenberger
- From July 2,1944 - Artillery General Anton Reichard von Mauchenheim genannt Bechtolsheim
- From September 1, 1944 - infantry general Kurt Röpke

== See also ==
- List of German corps in World War II
