= Joachim Lemelsen =

German general (1888–1954)

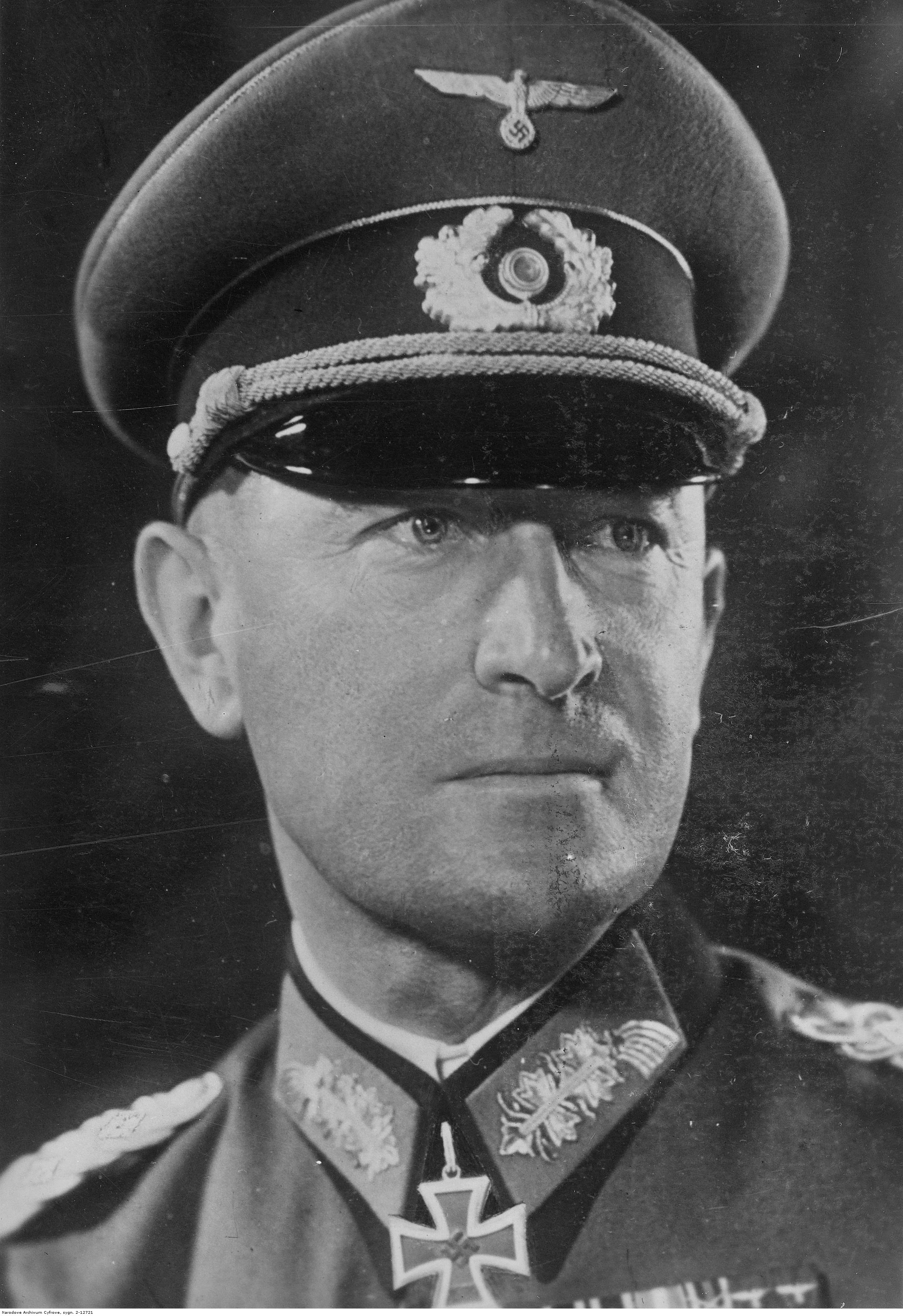
- Lemelsen in 1941
- Born: 28 September 1888; Berlin, German Empire
- Died: 30 March 1954 (aged 65); Göttingen, West Germany
- Military career
- Allegiance: German Empire; Weimar Republic; Nazi Germany
- Branch: Imperial German Army; Reichswehr; German Army
- Service years: 1907–1945
- Rank: General der Panzertruppe
- Commands: 5th Panzer Division; XLVII Panzer Corps; 1st Army; 14th Army
- Conflicts: World War I World War II
- Awards: Knight's Cross of the Iron Cross with Oak Leaves

Joachim Lemelsen (28 September 1888 – 30 March 1954) was a German general during World War II who rose to army-level command.

During Operation Barbarossa, the invasion of the Soviet Union in 1941, troops of the XLVII Motorized Corps under his command executed the criminal Commissar Order, prompting Lemelsen to complain: "Soon the Russians will get to hear about the countless corpses lying along the routes taken by our soldiers (...). The result will be that the enemy will hide in the woods and fields and continue to fight--and we shall lose countless comrades".

== Early life ==
Born in 1888 in Berlin, Lemelsen joined the army of Imperial Germany as an Fahnenjunker (officer cadet) in the artillery and later participated in World War I. Serving in the Wehrmacht of Nazi Germany, he commanded the Artillery Lehr Regiment in 1934 and from the following year taught at infantry school. In March 1938, Lemelsen was given command of the 29th Motorized Infantry Division.

== World War II ==
Lemelsen took part in the Invasion of Poland; his division was involved in the Massacre in Ciepielów of 8 September 1939. On 28 May 1940 he was given command of the 5th Panzer Division with which he participated in the Battle of Dunkirk.

On 25 November 1940 Lemelsen was given command of the new XLVII Motorized Corps, which he led in the Battle of Smolensk and the Battle of Kiev. Lemelsen reported to the Wehrmacht High Command about the executions of Soviet prisoners of war during the early phases of Operation Barbarossa:

I am repeatedly finding out about the shooting of prisoners, defectors or deserters, carried out in an irresponsible, senseless and criminal manner. This is murder. Soon the Russians will get to hear about the countless corpses lying along the routes taken by our soldiers, without weapons and with hands raised, dispatched at close range by shots to the head. The result will be that the enemy will hide in the woods and fields and continue to fight--and we shall lose countless comrades.

The Corps was designated a Panzer Corps in June 1942 and participated as such in anti-partisan operations and in the Battle of Kursk. Later, he temporarily commanded the 10th Army in Italy for two months until the end of December 1943. Lemelsen was given command of the 1st Army, stationed near the Atlantic coast in France in May 1944. On 7 June, Lemelsen was transferred to Italy to take over command of the 14th Army to replace Eberhard von Mackensen who the theatre commander Albert Kesselring had dismissed. Lemelsen commanded the army in the Italian Campaign from June 1944 until mid October when he was given command of Germany's other major formation in Italy 10th Army. In February 1945 he returned to the leadership of 14th Army until the end of hostilities in Italy in early May.

Imprisoned by British forces after the war, Lemelsen in 1947 testified on behalf of his former commander, Field Marshal Albert Kesselring, during Kesselring's war crimes trial before a British military court convened at Venice, Italy. Soon thereafter, Lemelsen was released. He died in 1954.

== Awards ==
- Iron Cross (1914) 2nd Class (21 September 1914) & 1st Class (5 December 1916)
- Knight's Cross of the House Order of Hohenzollern with swords
- Hanseatic Cross of Hamburg
- Clasp to the Iron Cross (1939) 2nd Class (21 September 1939) & 1st Class (30 September 1939)
- German Cross in Gold on 15 July 1942 as General der Panzertruppe and commander of the XXXXVII. Panzerkorps
- Knight's Cross of the Iron Cross with Oak Leaves
  - Knight's Cross on 27 July 1941 as General der Panzertruppe and commander of the XXXXVII. Panzerkorps
  - Oak Leaves on 7 September 1943 as General der Panzertruppe and commander of the XXXXVII. Panzerkorps

Military offices
Preceded by Generalleutnant Max von Hartlieb-Walsporn	Commander of 5. Panzer-Division; 29 May 1940 - 25 November 1940	Succeeded by General der Panzertruppe Gustav Fehn
Preceded by General Johannes Blaskowitz	Commander of 1. Armee; 3 May 1944 - 3 June 1944	Succeeded by General Kurt von der Chevallerie
Preceded by Generaloberst Eberhard von Mackensen	Commander of 14. Armee; 5 June 1944 - 15 October 1944	Succeeded by General der Panzertruppe Fridolin von Senger und Etterlin
Preceded by General der Infanterie Kurt von Tippelskirch	Commander of 14. Armee; 22 February 1945 - 2 May 1945	Succeeded by none
