= Robert Martinek =

German general

- Born: 2 February 1889; Gratzen, Bohemia, Austria-Hungary
- Died: 28 June 1944 (aged 55); Berezino, Belorussian SSR, Soviet Union
- Military career
- Allegiance: Austria-Hungary (to 1918); First Austrian Republic (to 1938); Nazi Germany
- Branch: Army (Wehrmacht)
- Service years: 1907–38 (Austria); 1938–44 (Nazi Germany)
- Rank: Oberst (Austria); General der Artillerie
- Commands: 267th Infantry Division; 7th Mountain Division; XXXIX Panzer Corps
- Conflicts: World War I; World War II
- Awards: Knight's Cross of the Iron Cross with Oak Leaves

Robert Martinek (2 February 1889 – 28 June 1944) was an Austrian general who served in the Wehrmacht of Nazi Germany during World War II. He was a recipient of the Knight's Cross of the Iron Cross with Oak Leaves.

An artillery officer of the Austro-Hungarian Army in World War I, Martinek continued to serve with the Austrian Bundesheer during the interwar period.

== Biography ==
Martinek was born on 2 February 1889 in Gratzen (now Nové Hrady, Czech Republic), where his father was a brewer. Enlisting in the army of Austria-Hungary in 1907, he was promoted to Leutnant in 1910, Oberleutnant in 1914, and to Hauptmann in 1917 for outstanding bravery. Serving with the Bundesheer after World War I, he taught at (and during the 1930s, headed) the Austrian military's Artillery School, reaching the rank of Oberst by the time of the Anschluss. In Austrian service, he made a number of artillery innovations, including new ranging and firing methods as well as a namesake sight adjustment system.

During World War II, he commanded the 267th Infantry Division from 5 November 1941, and the 7th Mountain Division during 1942. He was in command of the heavy concentrations of artillery in the Siege of Sevastopol as the higher artillery reserve commander of the 11th Army, which played a key role in the reduction of the fortifications of the strategic port city. On 1 December 1942 Martinek took command of XXXIX Panzer Corps, simultaneously being promoted to Generalleutnant. He was again promoted to General der Artillerie on New Year's Day 1943. For leading the corps in the retreat into eastern Belarus, he was awarded the Knight's Cross of the Iron Cross with Oak Leaves on 10 February 1944.

In June 1944, the XXXIX Panzer Corps was assigned to Army Group Centre in the Belorussian SSR. Shortly before the Soviet summer offensive, Operation Bagration, a battalion commander in the 12th Infantry Division raised concerns about a possible attack with Martinek, who was on a tour of inspection. Martinek agreed but in response cited the proverb "Whom God would destroy, he first strikes blind". Soviet forces launched the offensive on 22 June; Martinek's corps was rapidly outflanked. Martinek was killed in an air attack on 28 June near Berezino.

His notes from World War I were published as Kriegstagebuch eines Batterie-Kommandanten 1914–1918 in 1976; he was also the subject of a book by Erich Dethleffsen.

== Awards and decorations ==
- Iron Cross (1939) 2nd Class (25 September 1939) & 1st Class (20 May 1940)
- German Cross in Gold on 21 March 1943 as commander of XXXIX Panzer Corps
- Knight's Cross of the Iron Cross with Oak Leaves
  - Knight's Cross on 26 December 1941 as commander of 267th Infantry Division
  - Oak Leaves on 10 February 1944 as commander of XXXIX Panzer Corps

Military offices
Preceded by Generalleutnant Friedrich-Karl von Wachter	Commander of 267th Infantry Division; 10 November 1941 – 1 January 1942	Succeeded by Generalleutnant Friedrich-Karl von Wachter
Preceded by Generaloberst Hans-Jürgen von Arnim	Commander of XXXIX Panzer Corps; 1 December 1942 – 13 November 1943	Succeeded by General der Infanterie Carl Püchler
Preceded by General der Infanterie Carl Püchler	Commander of XXXIX Panzer Corps; 18 April 1944 – 28 June 1944	Succeeded by Generalleutnant Otto Schünemann
