= Otto von Knobelsdorff =

German general (1886–1966)

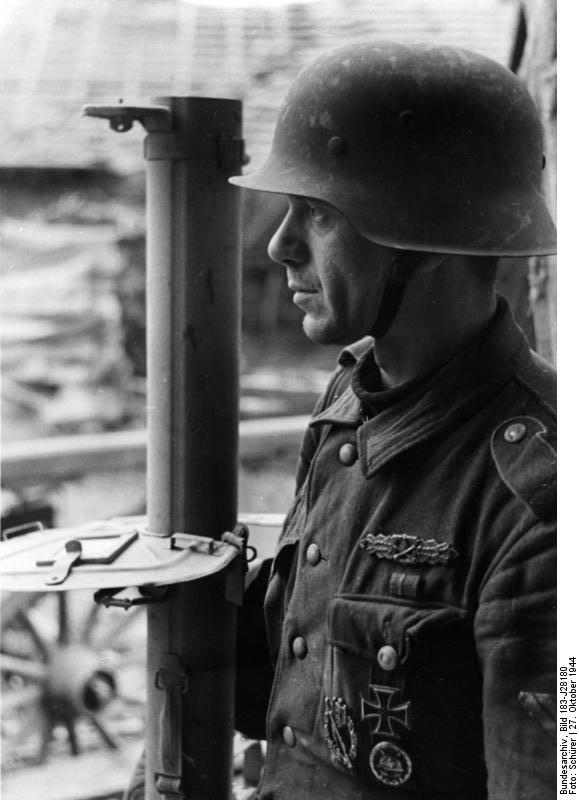
- German Grenadier with Panzerschreck during the Battle of Metz; General von Knobelsdorff commanded all German troops during the battle.
- Born: 31 March 1886; Berlin, Province of Brandenburg, Kingdom of Prussia, German Empire
- Died: 21 October 1966 (aged 80); Hannover, Lower Saxony,West Germany
- Burial place: Engesohde City Cemetery, Hannover
- Spouse: Beatrice Alexandrine "Alix" Margarete Paula Gabriele Helmine Cäcilie Eva Freiin von Korff genannt Schmising (m. 1914)
- Children: 3
- Military career
- Allegiance: German Empire; Weimar Republic; Nazi Germany
- Branch: Prussian Army; Imperial German Army; Reichsheer; German Army
- Service years: 1905–1945
- Rank: General der Panzertruppe
- Commands: 19th Panzer Division; X Army Corps; XXIV Panzer Corps; XXXX Panzer Corps; 1st Army
- Conflicts: World War I World War II: Poland Campaign; Battle of France; Operation Barbarossa; Battle of Kursk; Operation Doppelkopf; Lorraine Campaign; Battle of Metz; Battle of Fort Driant
- Awards: Knight's Cross of the Iron Cross with Oak Leaves and Swords

Heinrich Otto Ernst von Knobelsdorff (31 March 1886 – 21 October 1966) was a German general during World War II who led the 19th Panzer Division and then held a series of higher commands. He was a recipient of the Knight's Cross of the Iron Cross with Oak Leaves and Swords.

== Life ==
Born in Berlin in 1886 to a noble family, Knobelsdorff joined the army of Imperial Germany in 1905 as a Fahnenjunker (officer cadet) and served in the infantry. Twice awarded the Iron Cross during World War I, he later served in the Heer (Army) branch of the Wehrmacht. He was chief of staff of Corps Command XXXIII at the time of the outbreak of World War II. A Generalmajor, (Note: In the Wehrmacht, this was equivalent to the rank of brigadier general in the United States Army.) he was given command of the 19th Infantry Division on 1 February 1940 and led it through the Battle of France and during subsequent occupation duty. In October, the division was withdrawn to Germany for conversion to armour. It was re-designated the 19th Panzer Division and Knobelsdorff, promoted to Generalleutnant (Note: A generalleutnant was equivalent to a major general in the United States Army.) in late 1940, oversaw his command's transition from infantry to tanks.

With Knobelsdorff still in command, the division was sent to Russia as part of Operation Barbarossa and fought through to the outskirts of Moscow. In early 1942, he was acting commander of X Army Corps and fulfilled the same role for II Army Corps in mid-1942, when it was involved in the Demyansk Salient. He then commanded XXIV Panzer Corps, still as acting commander, before being given a permanent role leading XXXXVIII Panzer Corps from late 1942 to late 1943, although he spent three months out of the lines during this time. Now a General der Panzertruppe (General of Panzer Troops), during this period he was awarded the Oak Leaves to the Knight's Cross of the Iron Cross that he had been awarded in 1941 while leading the 19th Panzer Division and the German Cross in gold.

Competent as a leader of armoured formations, Knobelsdorff was given command of 1st Army in September 1944, serving in France at the time. Although awarded the Swords to his Knight's Cross the same month, he proved less adept at this level and was ultimately relieved in November 1944 for resisting Adolf Hitler's efforts to transfer 1st Army's tanks away in support of the Ardennes offensive. He ended the war without another command.

=== Post-WWII ===
In later life, he wrote Geschichte der niedersächsischen 19. Panzer-Division 1939–1945, a history of the 19th Panzer Division during WWII which was published in 1958.

== Death ==
General der Panzertruppe (Ret.) von Knobelsdorff died in Hannover in 1966.

== Promotions ==
- 25 April 1905 Fahnenjunker (Officer Candidate)
- 10 May 1905 Fahnenjunker-Unteroffizier (Officer Candidate with Corporal/NCO/Junior Sergeant rank)
- 27 January 1906 Fähnrich (Officer Cadet)
- 18 August 1906 Leutnant (2nd Lieutenant)
- 28 November 1914 Oberleutnant (1st Lieutenant)
- 22 March 1916 Hauptmann (Captain)
  - 10 September 1928 re-designated Rittmeister with effect from 1 October 1928
- 1 February 1929 Major
- 1 June 1933 Oberstleutnant (Lieutenant Colonel)
- 1 June 1935 Oberst (Colonel)
- 31 December 1938 Generalmajor (Major General) with effect and Rank Seniority (RDA) from 1 January 1939 (11)
- 20 November 1940 Generalleutnant (Lieutenant General) with effect and RDA from 1 December 1940 (2)
- 15 July 1942 General der Panzertruppe with effect and RDA from 1 August 1942 (2)

== Awards and decorations ==
- Iron Cross (1914), 2nd and 1st Class
  - 2nd Class on 19 September 1914
  - 1st Class on 27 February 1915
- Order of the White Falcon, Knight's Cross 2nd Class with Swords (GSF3bX/SF3bX) on 30 September 1914
- Austrian Military Merit Cross, 3rd Class with War Decoration (ÖM3K) on 7 December 1914
- Grand Duchy of Saxe-Weimar-Eisenach Wilhelm Ernst War Cross (GSK/SW) on 10 April 1915
- Saxe-Ernestine House Order, Knights Cross 2nd Class with Swords (HSEH3bX/HSH3bX/EH3bX) on 23 April 1915
- Lippe War Merit Cross on the ribbon for combatants on 17 December 1917
- Wound Badge (1918) in Black on 6 October 1918
- Knight of Honour (Ehrenritter) and Justice (Rechtsritter) of the Johanniter Order
  - Ehrenritter on 15 February 1923
  - Rechtsritter on 22 April 1949
- Honour Cross of the World War 1914/1918 with Swords on 21 January 1935
- Wehrmacht Long Service Award, 4th to 1st Class (25-year Service Cross) on 2 October 1936
- Sudetenland Medal
- Repetition Clasp 1939 to the Iron Cross 1914, 2nd and 1st Class
  - 2nd Class on 11 October 1939
  - 1st Class on 20 May 1940
- Panzer Badge in Silver on 19 September 1941
- Winter Battle in the East 1941–42 Medal on 8 August 1942
- German Cross in Gold on 17 February 1943 as General der Panzertruppe and Commanding General of the XXXXVIII. Panzerkorps
- Two references by name in the Wehrmachtbericht: 20 February 1943 and 8 June 1944
- Knight's Cross of the Iron Cross with Oak Leaves and Swords
  - Knight's Cross of the Iron Cross on 17 September 1941 as Generalleutnant and Commander of the 19th Panzer Division
  - 322nd Oak Leaves on 12 November 1943 as General der Panzertruppe and Commanding General of the XXXXVIII Panzer Corps
  - 100th Swords on 21 September 1944 as General der Panzertruppe and Commanding General of the XXXX Panzer Corps

== Notes ==
Footnotes

Citations

Military offices
Preceded by Generalleutnant Günther Schwantes	Commander of 19th Infantry Division; 1 February 1940 – 1 November 1940	Succeeded by redesignated 19th Panzer Division
Preceded by 19th Infantry Division	Commander of 19th Panzer Division; 1 November 1940 – 5 January 1942	Succeeded by Generalleutnant Gustav Schmidt
Preceded by General der Panzertruppe Heinrich Eberbach	Commander of XXXXVIII Panzerkorps; 30 November 1942 – 6 May 1943	Succeeded by General der Infanterie Dietrich von Choltitz
Preceded by General der Infanterie Dietrich von Choltitz	Commander of XXXXVIII Panzerkorps; 30 August 1943 – 30 September 1943	Succeeded by General der Infanterie Dietrich von Choltitz
Preceded by General der Panzertruppen Ferdinand Schörner	Commander of XXXX Panzer Corps; 1 February 1944 – 31 August 1944	Succeeded by General der Panzertruppen Siegfried Henrici
Preceded by General Kurt von der Chevallerie	Commander of 1st Army; 6 September 1944 – 29 November 1944	Succeeded by General Hans von Obstfelder
