= Sullivan Museum and History Center =

History museum at Norwich University, United States

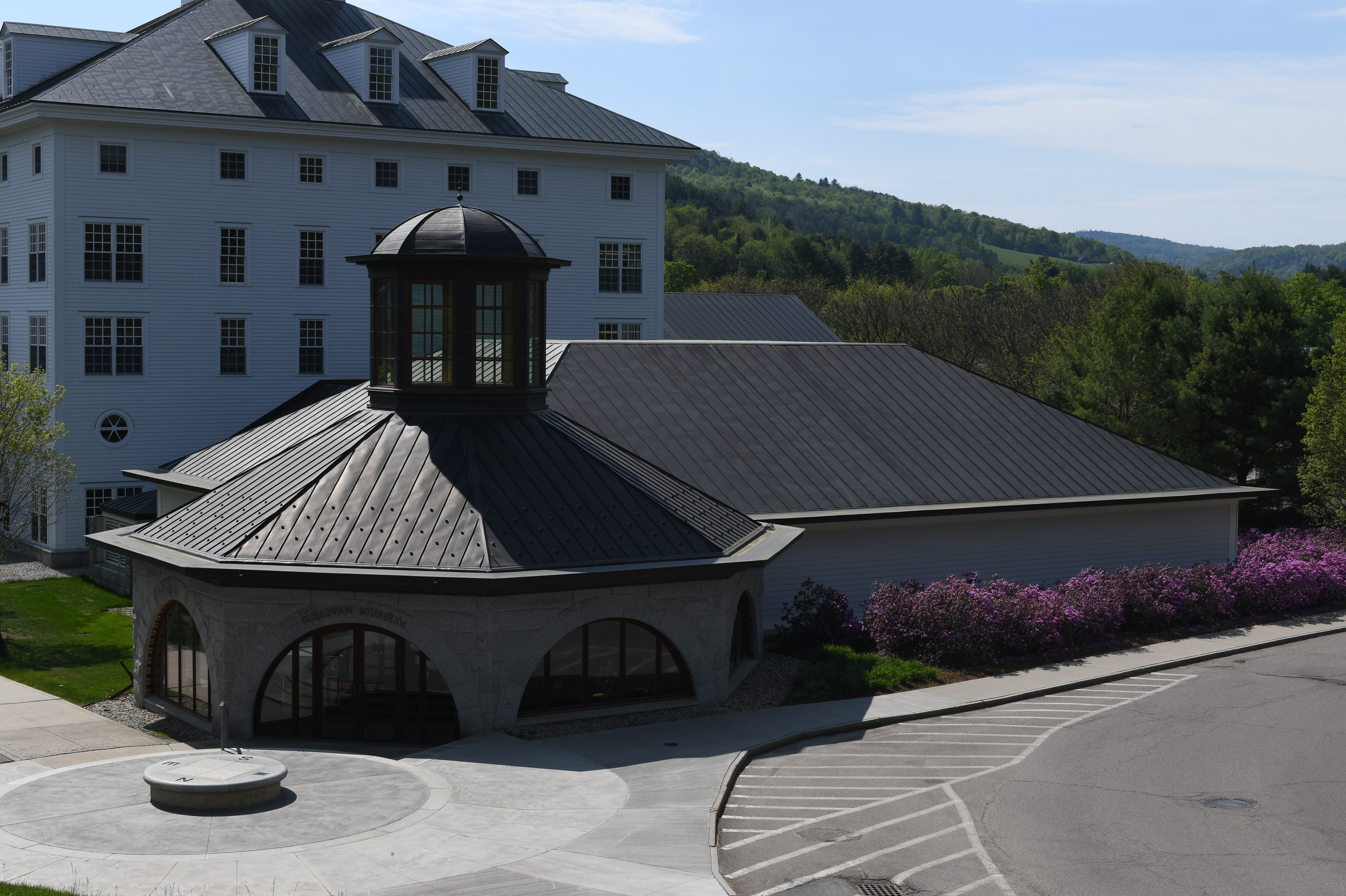
- Sullivan Museum and History Center Rotunda and Main Building
- Established: 2007
- Location: 158 Harmon Drive; Northfield, Vermont, United States
- Coordinates: 44.1371°N 72.6607°W
- Type: History, Military History
- Collection size: 20,000+
- Owner: Norwich University
- Parking: On site parking, free
- Website: www.norwich.edu/museum collections.norwich.edu

The Sullivan Museum and History Center is the official museum of Norwich University, named for GEN Gordon R. Sullivan, USA (Ret.) '59. Located in Northfield, Vermont, and opened in 2007, the facility is 16,000 square feet and includes both permanent and changing exhibits featuring items and exploring themes from the 200-year history of the school and from broader American military history, through the lens of Norwich staff, students, and friends' experiences and accomplishments in both the military and private spheres, along with rotating artists' exhibits and student work. It the first museum in Vermont to be affiliated with the Smithsonian Institution, allowing the museum to access Smithsonian collections and material to provide more offerings to the public than it could on its own.

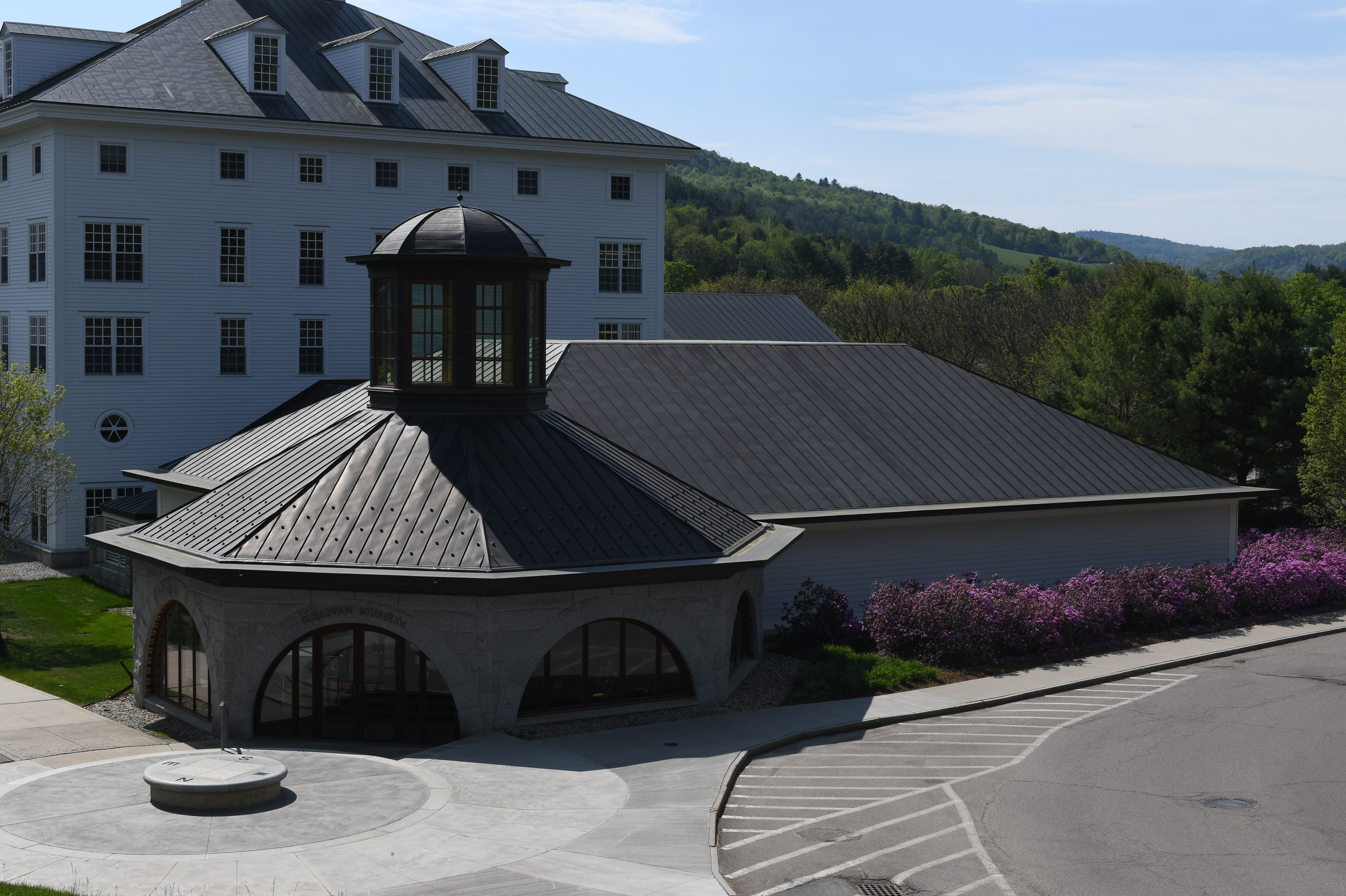

The museum is open year-round Monday through Friday 8am–4pm and during the academic year (September through early May) on Saturdays 11am–4pm. Admission to the museum is free and the museum is handicap accessible.

== Collections ==
The Sullivan Museum and History Center's collection ranges from uniforms of university alumni to fine art, folk art, Norwich University ephemera, and more. As of March 2023, the museum collection numbered over 20,000 objects including audio-visual materials documenting the university for nearly 200 years.

== Exhibitions ==
The museum presents exhibits about the university's history and its military ties. Yearly rotating exhibits present a topic of interest, sometimes linked to major historical events (anniversaries) or major occurrences in the history of Norwich University. Exhibit information can be found on its main website and its online database.
