= Hans von Obstfelder =

German general (1886–1976)

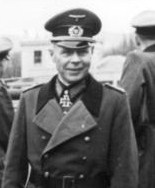
- Von Obstfelder in 1944
- Born: 6 September 1886; Steinbach-Hallenberg, Province of Hesse-Nassau, Kingdom of Prussia, German Empire
- Died: 20 December 1976 (aged 90); Bad Emstal, Hesse, West Germany
- Relatives: ∞ 22 February 1912 Gerda Bürner; 2 daughters
- Military career
- Allegiance: German Empire; Weimar Republic; Nazi Germany
- Branch: Prussian Army; Imperial German Army; Reichswehr; German Army
- Service years: 1905–1945
- Rank: General der Infanterie
- Commands: 28th Infantry Division; XXIX Army Corps; LXXXVI Army Corps; 1st Army; 19th Army; 7th Army
- Conflicts: World War I World War II: Poland Campaign; Battle of France; Operation Barbarossa; Operation Nordwind
- Awards: Knight's Cross of the Iron Cross with Oak Leaves and Swords

Erich Günter Hans Obstfelder, as of 1922 von Obstfelder (6 September 1886 – 20 December 1976), was a German general (General of the Infantry) in the Wehrmacht during World War II. He was a recipient of the Knight's Cross of the Iron Cross with Oak Leaves and Swords.

== Life ==
Hans was born the son of Lutheran Superintendent Gustav Adolf Obstfelder (1847–1930) and his wife Lina, née von Ziegler (c. 1860 – 19 November 1930). He had (at least) seven siblings. Superintendent Obstfelder received the right to use the title "von Obstfelder" on 20 November 1918. His son, Captain Hans Obstfelder, received the right from the Reichswehr Ministry in December 1922 to henceforth use the family name "von Obstfelder".

"Gustav Adolf Obstfelder was born on 18 February 1847 in Gotha, the son of a farmstead manager. He attended the cathedral grammar school and studied at the universities of Erlangen, Leipzig, and Halle. He passed his first examination in Gotha. On 25 March 1873, he was ordained in the Augustinian Church in Gotha by General Superintendent Petersen. On 1 April 1873, he became the third pastor in Gotha, and after a trial sermon before the Duke, he became Ducal court preacher on 1 October 1874. However, because his duties were made very difficult by the very liberal approach of the chief court preacher, he took over the parish in Schönau an der Hörsel (near Eisenach) on 1 October 1875. [...] The local branch of the "Patriotic Women's Association of the Red Cross" was founded on 12 August 1886, by Pastor Obstfelder and affiliated with the Patriotic Women's Association in Kassel. The pastor's wife served as chairwoman, and the pastor was the secretary. The association consisted primarily of women from the upper classes and undertook tasks related to the Red Cross and poor relief. [...] On 9 December 1888, Elias Rommel and Richard Pfeffer beat the forest warden Hengelhaupt from Rotterode to death with wooden clubs near the Zion Church. Rommel's parents had already quarreled with Hengelhaupt, probably over poaching. On 24 October 1889, the murderers were beheaded in Erfurt. Pastor Obstfelder was present at the execution and offered spiritual support. [...] At the behest of his superiors, he applied for the position of senior pastor in Schmalkalden, having already served as acting superintendent since 1891. On 30 July 1892, he became senior pastor and on 19 September 1892 superintendent in Schmalkalden. Obstfelder was considered a "dashing man" and was often feared, even hated, for his strictness and straightforwardness. But he was also a good preacher and his ministry in Schmalkalden was a blessing. During his time, the interior of the town church was renovated and rededicated on 31 October 1909 (at which time the Martin Luther figure was inserted into the pillar of the nave), the cemetery church and the hospital chapel were refurbished, the upper parish church on what is now Geschwister-Scholl-Straße was built according to his designs, a children's choir was founded, and the men's church choir was transformed into a mixed choir. Obstfelder received various decorations [...] On 30 March 1919, he held his last confirmation service and farewell sermon and retired on 1 April 1919, after 47 years of service. Gustav Adolf von Obstfelder died in Schmalkalden on 12 January 1930."

=== WWII ===
In September 1941, during Operation Barbarossa, the Nazi invasion of the Soviet Union, Obstfelder commanded the 29th Army Corps, which was among the first units of the Wehrmacht to reach Kyiv.

In October 2021, against the background of official commemorations marking the 80th anniversary of the Babi Yar Massacre, Obstfelder's name appeared among the 161 names of the perpetrators of that crime, released by the Babi Year Holocaust Memorial Center. Obstfelder was never tried for his alleged involvement in the Babi Yar massacre.

== Promotions ==
- 17 March 1905 Fahnenjunker (Officer Candidate)
- 20 May 1905 Fahnenjunker-Gefreiter (Officer Candidate with Lance Corporal rank)
- 1 August 1905 Fahnenjunker-Unteroffizier (Officer Candidate with Corporal/NCO/Junior Sergeant rank)
- 18 November 1905 Fähnrich (Officer Cadet)
- 18 August 1906 Leutnant (2nd Lieutenant) with Patent from 15 February 1905
- 17 February 1914 Oberleutnant (1st Lieutenant)
- 18 June 1915 Hauptmann (Captain)
  - 1 February 1922 received Reichswehr Rank Seniority (RDA) from 18 June 1915 (8)
- 1 February 1926 Major (5)
- 1 June 1930 Oberstleutnant (Lieutenant Colonel) with effect and RDA from 1 April 1930 (13)
- 1 March 1933 Oberst (Colonel) with RDA from 1 March 1933 (1)
- 18 January 1936 Generalmajor (Major General) with effect and RDA from 1 January 1936 (2)
- 23 January 1938 Generalleutnant (Lieutenant General) with effect and RDA from 1 February 1938 (3)
- 17 June 1940 General der Infanterie (General of the Infantry) with effect and RDA from 1 June 1940 (1)

== Awards and decorations ==
- Iron Cross (1914), 2nd and 1st Class
  - 2nd Class on 5 September 1914
  - 1st Class on 19 June 1915
- Saxe-Ernestine House Order, Knights Cross 2nd Class with Swords (HSEH3bX/HSH3bX/EH3bX) on 8 January 1915
- Order of the White Falcon, Knight's Cross 2nd Class with Swords (GSF3bX/SF3bX) on 27 April 1916
- Saxe-Ernestine House Order, Knights Cross 1st Class with Swords (HSEH3aX/HSH3aX/EH3aX) on 20 May 1916 as Captain and Adjutant of the 22nd Reserve Division
- Hamburg Hanseatic Cross (HH) on 5 November 1918
- Honour Cross of the World War 1914/1918 with Swords on 20 December 1934
- Wehrmacht Long Service Award, 4th to 1st Class on 2 October 1936
- Sudetenland Medal with the “Prague Castle” clasp
  - Medal on 22 March 1939
  - Clasp post-May 1939
- Repetition Clasp 1939 to the Iron Cross 1914, 2nd and 1st Class
  - 2nd Class on 20 September 1939
  - 1st Class on 29 September 1939
- Winter Battle in the East 1941–42 Medal on 5 August 1942
- Wound Badge (1939) in Black on 9 January 1943
- Italian Military Order of Savoy, Knight's Cross on 18 March 1943
- German Cross in Gold on 21 April 1943 as General der Infantry and commanding general of the XXIX. Armeekorps
- Knight's Cross of the Iron Cross with Oak Leaves and Swords
  - Knight's Cross on 27 July 1941 as General der Infanterie and commanding general of the XXIX. Armeekorps
  - 251st Oak Leaves on 7 June 1943 as General der Infanterie and commanding general of the XXIX. Armeekorps
  - 110th Swords on 9 November 1944 as General der Infanterie and commanding general of the LXXXVI. Armeekorps

Military offices
| Preceded by — | Commander of 28. Infanterie-Division; 1 October 1936 – 21 May 1940 | Succeeded by Generalleutnant Johann Sinnhuber |
| Preceded by — | Commander of XXIX. Armeekorps; 20 May 1940 – 21 May 1943 | Succeeded by General der Panzertruppe Erich Brandenberger |
| Preceded by General der Infanterie Bruno Bieler | Commander of LXXXVI. Armeekorps; 28 August 1943 – 30 November 1944 | Succeeded by General der Infanterie Carl Püchler |
| Preceded by General Otto von Knobelsdorff | Commander of 1. Armee; 6 November 1944 – 27 February 1945 | Succeeded by General Hermann Foertsch |
| Preceded by General der Infanterie Hermann Foertsch | Commander of 19. Armee; 1 March 1945 – 25 March 1945 | Succeeded by General der Panzertruppe Erich Brandenberger |
| Preceded by General Hans Felber | Commander of 7. Armee; 26 March 1945 – 4 May 1945 | Succeeded by none |
