= 7th Army (Wehrmacht) =

- German: 7. Armee
- Insignia
- Active: 1939–45
- Country: Nazi Germany
- Branch: German Army
- Type: Field army
- Engagements: Battle of France; Battle of Frankfurt; Battle of Normandy; Battle of the Falaise Pocket; Battle of the Bulge

Commanders
- Notable commanders: Friedrich Dollmann; Paul Hausser; Heinrich Eberbach; Erich Brandenberger; Hans Felber; Hans von Obstfelder

The 7th Army (German: 7. Armee) was a World War II field army of the German land forces.

== History ==
=== Origins ===
The 7th Army was activated in Stuttgart on August 25, 1939 with General Friedrich Dollmann in command. At the outbreak of the war, the 7th Army defended the French border and manned the Westwall in the Upper Rhine region. At the start of the Campaign in the West in 1940, the 7th Army was part of General Wilhelm Ritter von Leeb's Army Group C. On 14 June 1940, Army Group C attacked the Maginot Line after it had been cut off by armored units of the XXXXI Panzer Corps. Lead elements of the 7th Army reached the area in front of Colmar and later pursued parts of the French 2nd Army Group into Lorraine. At the conclusion of the campaign, the 7th Army was in eastern France. From July 1940 until April 1941, the 7th Army guarded a region of the coast in southwestern France. From 18 April 1941, the 7th Army was responsible for coastal defense in Brittany and Normandy. By mid-1944, the 7th Army was part of Erwin Rommel's Army Group B.

=== Normandy ===
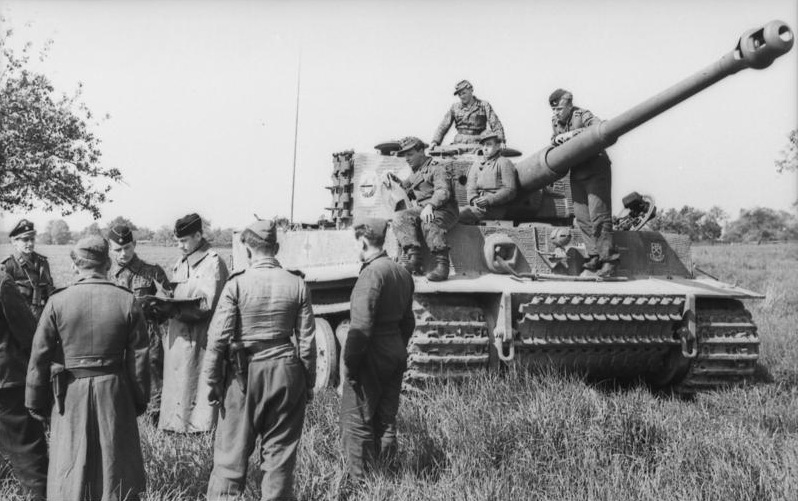
Tiger 1 from the 7th Army near Normandy, 1944

At the time of the first Western Allied Normandy Landings on 6 June 1944 ("D-Day"), the 7th Army was headquartered at Le Mans.

Because of uncertainty in the German high command regarding Allied intentions after the D-Day landings, the 7th Army did most of the initial fighting in Normandy although it was later reinforced by the Panzer Group West. The 15th Army was kept at the Pas de Calais, expecting another landing by the Allies. By 18 June, the 7th Army had lost 97,000 men, including five generals. On 28 June, the army's commander, General Dollmann, died of a heart attack.

Under unrelenting Allied pressure, the 7th Army was slowly forced back through the hedgerow country in Normandy. Finally, in Operation Cobra in late July 1944, the 7th Army's weakened left wing was flattened by a massive Allied aerial bombardment and then assaulted and broken by the US 1st Army. Armored exploitation of this rent in the front lines by US units forced a German retreat and then an unsuccessful counter-attack which culminated in the 7th Army being nearly wiped out in the Falaise Pocket.

Abandoning what remained of their heavy equipment, shattered remnants of the 7th Army escaped from the Falaise Pocket and retreated eastward to the German border. Many of the surviving members of the 7th Army were captured in early September during the Battle of the Mons Pocket. During the autumn of 1944, the 7th Army adopted a defensive posture in the Eifel region on the Belgian and Luxembourgish border while Hitler husbanded forces for a winter offensive on the Western Front.

=== Battle of the Bulge ===
During the Battle of the Bulge it consisted of six Infantry (9th, 79th, 212th, 276th, 340th, and 352nd Volksgrenadier) Divisions, one Panzergrenadier (15th) Division, one Parachute (5th) Division, and one Panzer/Panzergrenadier (Führer Grenadier) Brigade.

Its role was to protect the southern flank of the Fifth Panzer Army and the entire Ardennes Offensive. Like the other two German armies in the offensive, the 7th Army took substantial losses. The 7th Army defended against the northward attack of the US 3rd Army, but ultimately failed to halt General George S. Patton's drive to Bastogne and Houffalize. The 7th Army, however, managed to avoid encirclement and retreated again to the Westwall.

=== Germany ===
In January 1945, the U.S. 3rd Army attacked to the east, forcing the 7th Army to retreat from the area of Trier to the region of Koblenz. Under further U.S. pressure, the 7th Army was forced to retreat through the areas around Mainz and Mannheim. Unable to stop the U.S. advances in central Germany during March and April 1945, the 7th Army continued its retreat through the valleys of the Main and Lahn Rivers, through the Spessart hills, Fulda, Gotha, and then through the Thuringian Forest to the region between Leipzig and Hof.

=== Surrender ===
The 7th Army surrendered to U.S. 3rd Army in the area of the Bavarian Forest and western Bohemia on 8 May 1945.

== Commanders ==
No.	Portrait	Commander	Took office	Left office	Time in office
1	Friedrich Dollmann	Generaloberst; Friedrich Dollmann (1882–1944)	25 August 1939	28 June 1944 †	4 years, 332 days
2	Paul Hausser	SS-Obergruppenführer; Paul Hausser (1880–1972)	29 June 1944	20 August 1944	52 days
3	Heinrich Eberbach	General der Panzertruppe; Heinrich Eberbach (1895–1992)	21 August 1944	30 August 1944	9 days
4	Erich Brandenberger	General der Panzertruppe; Erich Brandenberger (1892–1955)	3 September 1944	21 February 1945	171 days
5	Hans Felber	General der Infanterie; Hans Felber (1889–1962)	22 February 1945	25 March 1945	43 days
6	Hans von Obstfelder	General der Infanterie; Hans von Obstfelder (1886–1976)	26 March 1945	8 May 1945	43 days

== See also ==
- 7th Army (German Empire) for the equivalent formation in World War I

== Bibliography ==
- Elstob, Peter. Hitler's Last Offensive, Pen & Sword Military Classics #15, Barnsley, 2003. ISBN 0-85052-984-0
