= 1st Army (Wehrmacht) =

1939–1945 German field army

- German: 1. Armee
- Active: 26 August 1939 – 6 May 1945
- Country: Nazi Germany
- Branch: German army ( Wehrmacht)
- Type: Field army (Wehrmacht)
- Engagements: World War II

Commanders
- Notable commanders: Erwin von Witzleben; Johannes Blaskowitz; Joachim Lemelsen; Kurt von der Chevallerie; Otto von Knobelsdorff; Kurt von Tippelskirch; Hans von Obstfelder; Hermann Foertsch; Rudolf Koch-Erpach

The 1st Army (German: 1. Armee) was a World War II field army.

== Operational history ==
=== 1939 ===
The 1st Army was activated on 26 August 1939, in Wehrkreis XII with General Erwin von Witzleben in command. Its primary mission was to take defensive positions and guard the western defences (West Wall) of Germany against Allied forces along the Maginot Line during the attack on Poland, making it the principal German combatant during the short-lived French Saar Offensive.

=== 1940 ===
During the Western campaign it belonged to the Army Group C and initially remained passive towards the Maginot Line. the 1st Army continued its defensive assignment on the French border until June 1940, when the Battle of France had turned decisively to Germany's favor.

Starting on 14 June 1940, the 1st Army began the penetration of the Maginot Line, breaking through French defenses, it began concentrating its forces in the frontier sector south of Saarbrücken. Another penetration was conducted north of Wörth am Main on 19 June. Beginning on 21 June and until 24 June, the 1st Army participated in the annihilation of the remnants of the French forces in the Moselle and Vosges regions.

After the end of the western campaign, the army remained in France. It secured the demarcation line and then the Atlantic coast (Atlantic Wall) in southwest France until May 1942, when they were moved to Normandy.

=== 1944 ===
After the French capitulation, the 1st Army spent until mid-1944 protecting the Atlantic coast of France from a possible seaborne incursion. At the time of the first Allied Normandy landings on 6 June 1944, the 1st Army, then under Kurt von der Chevallerie was headquartered at Bordeaux and attached to Johannes Blaskowitz's Army Group G at Toulouse, along with 19th Army (Georg von Sodenstern) at Avignon. was pushed back to the western border of the German Reich. and reorganized in Lorraine after a hasty retreat with the rest of the German forces across France, in August 1944, During the battles along the German frontier, the First Army attempted to prevent the Third United States Army from crossing the Moselle River and capturing Metz while also attempting to hold the northern Vosges Mountains against the Seventh United States Army.

In November 1944, both defensive lines were broken and the First Army retreated to the German border and defended the Saarland of Germany, an important industrial region.

=== 1945 ===
With the Third U.S. Army engaged to the north against the German Ardennes Offensive, the 1st Army attacked the Seventh U.S. Army on New Year's Day 1945 in Operation Nordwind, causing the Americans to give ground and inflicting significant casualties where Seventh U.S. Army defensive lines were stretched taut by the length of frontage they had to cover. With the failure of Nordwind in late January, the 1st Army was first pushed back to the Siegfried Line and then forced to retreat across the Rhine River. From March 15 to March 24, 1945 during Operation Undertone, the 7th US Army on a broad front surrounded to the 1st Army near Kaiserslautern. However, when the Allies pierced the German fortifications, they were forced to retreat. Thereafter, the First Army made an ordered withdrawal to the Danube River, and later to Munich. On May 6, 1945, near the Alps, the 1st army surrendered to allied forces.

== Noteworthy individuals ==
=== Commanders ===
No.	Portrait	Commander	Took office	Left office	Time in office
1	Erwin von Witzleben	Generaloberst; Erwin von Witzleben (1881–1944)	26 August 1939	23 October 1940	1 year, 58 days
2	Johannes Blaskowitz	Generaloberst; Johannes Blaskowitz (1883–1948)	24 October 1940	2 May 1944	3 years, 191 days
3	Joachim Lemelsen	General der Panzertruppe; Joachim Lemelsen (1888–1954)	3 May 1944	3 June 1944	31 days
4	Kurt von der Chevallerie	General der Infanterie; Kurt von der Chevallerie (1891–1945)	4 June 1944	5 September 1944	93 days
5	Otto von Knobelsdorff	General der Panzertruppe; Otto von Knobelsdorff (1886–1966)	6 September 1944	29 November 1944	84 days
6	Kurt von Tippelskirch	General der Infanterie; Kurt von Tippelskirch (1891–1957)	30 October 1944	11 November 1944	12 days
7	Hans von Obstfelder	General der Infanterie; Hans von Obstfelder (1886–1976)	30 November 1944	2 February 1945	64 days
8	Hermann Foertsch	General der Infanterie; Hermann Foertsch (1895–1961)	28 February 1945	4 May 1945	65 days
9	Rudolf Koch-Erpach	General der Kavallerie; Rudolf Koch-Erpach (1886–1971)	6 May 1945	8 May 1945	2 days

=== Chiefs of Staff ===
- Generalmajor Friedrich Mieth (26 May 1939 – 5 Feb 1940)
- Generalmajor Carl Hilpert (5 Feb 1940 – 25 Oct 1940)
- Oberst Edgar Röhricht (25 Oct 1940 – 16 June 1942; promoted to Generalmajor 1 Feb 1942)
- Generalmajor Anton-Reichard von Mauchenheim genannt Bechtolsheim (16 June 1942 – 1 Aug 1943)
- Oberst Gerhard Feyerabend (1 Aug 1943 – 10 Sep 1944; promoted to Generalmajor 1 Feb 1944)
- Oberst Willi Mantey (10 Sep 1944 – 7 Dec 1944)
- Oberst Walter Reinhard (7 Dec 1944 – 20 Feb 1945)
- Generalmajor Wolf Rüdiger Hauser (20 Feb 1945 – 8 May 1945)

== See also ==
- 1st Army (German Empire) for the equivalent formation in World War I.
