= 99th Light Infantry Division =

99. Leichte Infanterie-Division; German 99th Infantry Division
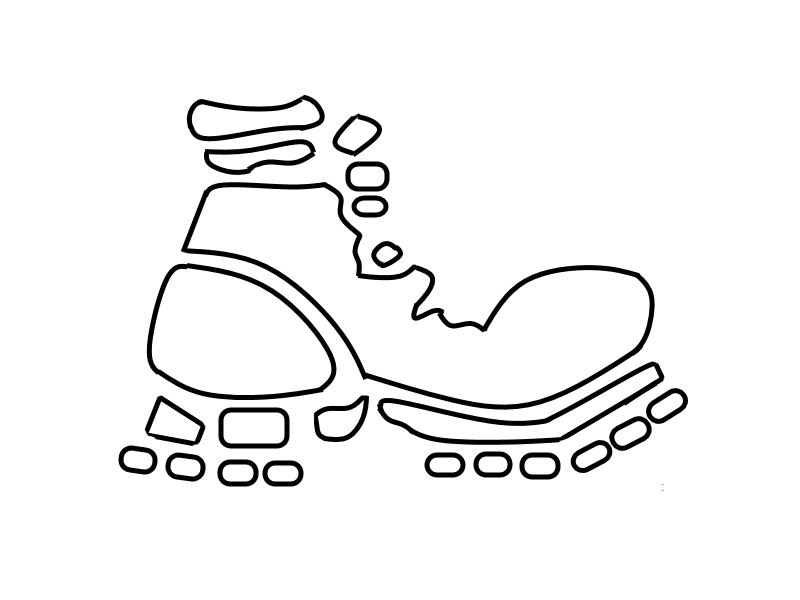
- 99. Leichte Infanterie Division Vehicle Insignia
- Active: November 1940 – 8 May 1945
- Country: Nazi Germany
- Branch: Heer (Wehrmacht)
- Type: Infantry
- Size: Division
- Engagements: World War II

The 99th Light Infantry Division (German: 99. Leichte Infanterie-Division) was raised in November 1940 and remained in training at Bad Kissingen until the summer of 1941. In June it took part in Operation Barbarossa—the German invasion of the Soviet Union—and operated in Poland and Ukraine under Army Group South until the fall, when it was withdrawn to Germany for reorganization as the 7th Mountain Division.

In early 1942 the 7th Mountain Division was transferred to serve under the 20th Mountain Army in Lapland, and remained there until it withdrew into Norway at the beginning of 1945. It surrendered to the British there at the end of the war in May.

== War Crimes ==
The 99th division participated in the Massacre at Babi Yar
