= 18th Volksgrenadier Division =

- Founded: 1944
- Disbanded: 1945
- Country: Germany
- Allegiance: Adolf Hitler
- Branch: German Army
- Type: Volksgrenadier
- Size: Division

Commanders
- Notable commanders: Günther Hoffmann-Schönborn; Walter Botsch; Heinz Kokott

The 18th Volksgrenadier Division (18. Volksgrenadier-Division; 18. VGD) was a volksgrenadier division of the German Army (i.e. Heer) during the Second World War, active from 1944 to 1945.

The division was formed in Denmark, in September 1944, by redesignating 571. Volksgrenadier-Division. Under the command of Günther Hoffmann-Schönborn, the new division absorbed elements of the 18th Luftwaffe Field Division. It contained the 293., 294. and 295. grenadier regiments, Panzerjäger-Bataillon 1818, Pionier-Bataillon 1818, Füsilier-Bataillon 1818 and Artillerie-Regiment 1818.

The division fought in the Ardennes, inflicting on the 106th US Infantry Division the worst defeat suffered by U.S. forces in the European theatre of World War II, when over 8,000 American soldiers surrendered to German troops. On December 21, 18. VGD captured St. Vith, winning a great victory. As the offensive steam came to an end in the Ardennes, the division went on the defensive, and there they would stay. Eventually retreating through Germany until the end of the war, when it surrendered. On February 5, 1945 General Walter Botsch took over command of the division. On March 6, 1945, when Botsch was ordered to take command of the LIIIrd Army Corps, the 18. VGD division was absorbed into the 26. VGD led by Heinz Kokott, Heinrich Himmler's brother-in-law.

== Knights Cross Holders ==
- Wilhelm Drueke December 30, 1944
- Gunther Rennhack December 30, 1944
- Friedrich Hadenfeldt March 17, 1945
