= 328th Division =

328th Division may refer to:

- 328th Infantry Division, Wehrmacht, Germany
- 328th Rifle Division, Soviet Union

== See also ==
- List of military divisions by number
