= Joachim von Tresckow =

German general (1894–1958)

- Born: 20 June 1894; Danzig-Langfuhr, German Empire
- Died: 3 November 1958 (aged 64); Bückeburg, West Germany
- Military career
- Allegiance: German Empire (to 1918); Weimar Republic (to 1933); Nazi Germany
- Branch: Imperial German Army; Reichswehr; Army (Wehrmacht)
- Service years: 1912–1945
- Rank: Generalleutnant
- Commands: 328. Infanterie-Division; 18. Luftwaffen-Division; LIX. Armeekorps
- Conflicts: World War I World War II
- Awards: Knight's Cross of the Iron Cross; German Cross in Gold

Joachim von Tresckow (20 June 1894 – 3 November 1958) was a German general during World War II. He was a recipient of the Knight's Cross of the Iron Cross of Nazi Germany.

Tresckow was born at Danzig in 1894. He joined the German Imperial Army in 1912 and served in World War I. At the end of the war, he was a Leutnant in Fusilier Regiment 73. He remained in the peacetime Reichswehr as a career officer. From 1934 to 1938, he was an instructor at the war school in Dresden. In World War II, Tresckow was a battalion commander in the 58th Infantry Regiment before becoming the regiment's commander in December 1939. In March 1942, he was made commander of the 328th Infantry Division. From March 1942 to November 1943, he was the Inspector for Italian forces in Germany. From February to October 1944, Tresckow commanded the 18th Luftwaffe Field Division. He led the LIX Army Corps for a brief period, shortly before Germany's surrender in May.

== Awards and decorations ==
- Iron Cross (1914)
  - 2nd class
  - 1st class
- Hanseatic Cross of Hamburg
- War Merit Cross of Brunswick, 1st class
- Wound Badge in silver
- Honour Cross of the World War 1914/1918
- Clasp to the Iron Cross (1939)
  - 2nd class
  - 1st class
- German Cross in Gold (15 December 1941)
- Knight's Cross of the Iron Cross on 19 September 1944 as Generalleutnant and commander of the 18. Luftwaffen-Feld-Division

Military offices
Preceded by Generalleutnant Wilhelm Behrens	Commander of 328. Infanterie-Division; 3 April 1942 – 20 November 1943	Succeeded by Unit disbanded
Preceded by Generalleutnant Wilhelm Rupprecht	Commander of 18. Luftwaffen-Feld-Division; 1 February 1944 – September 1944	Succeeded by Generalmajor Günther Hoffmann-Schönborn
Preceded by General der Infanterie Edgar Röhricht	Commander of LIX. Armeekorps; 29 January 1945 – 1 February 1945	Succeeded by Generalleutnant Ernst Sieler
