= Walter Botsch =

German general (1897–1969)

- Born: 27 February 1897; Braunsbach, German Empire
- Died: 7 January 1969 (aged 71); Schwäbisch Gmünd, West Germany
- Military career
- Allegiance: Nazi Germany
- Branch: Army (Wehrmacht)
- Rank: Generalleutnant
- Unit: 19th Army
- Commands: 18th Volksgrenadier Division; LIII. Armeekorps; LVIII. Panzerkorps
- Conflicts: World War II
- Awards: Knight's Cross of the Iron Cross

Walter Hugo Botsch (27 February 1897 – 7 January 1969) was a German general during World War II who commanded the 19th Army. He was a recipient of the Knight's Cross of the Iron Cross of Nazi Germany.

== Awards ==
- Iron Cross (1914) 2nd Class & 1st Class
- Honour Cross of the World War 1914/1918 (21 January 1935)
- Clasp to the Iron Cross (1939) 2nd Class (20 April 1940) & 1st Class (19 June 1940)
- German Cross in Gold on 22 June 1942 as Oberst im Generalstab in the XXX. Armeekorps
- Knight's Cross of the Iron Cross on 9 May 1945 as Generalleutnant and acting leader of the LVIII. Panzerkorps (Note: According to Scherzer as commanding general of the LIII. Armeekorps.) (Note: Walter Botsch's nomination by the troop was received by the Heerespersonalamt (HPA – Army Staff Office) on 27 October 1944, forwarded for approval on 3 November 1944 and apparently deferred. The file card notes in the field for the presentation: "see folder for further leadership reports". A second nomination by the troop was received by the HPA on 5 April 1945. The book of "awarded Knight Crosses" states "deferred" because Botsch was considered missing in action on 16 April 1945. A nomination of the HPA with number 5082 was created. According to the Association of Knight's Cross Recipients (AKCR) the award was presented in accordance with the Dönitz-decree. This is illegal according to the Deutsche Dienststelle (WASt) and lacks legal justification. The presentation date was assigned by Walther-Peer Fellgiebel.)

== Notes ==
Military offices
Preceded by None	Chief of Staff of 19. Armee; August 1943 – January 1945	Succeeded by Oberst i.G. Kurt Brandstädter
Preceded by Generalmajor Günther Hoffmann-Schönborn	Commander of 18. Volksgrenadier-Division; 5 February 1945 – 6 March 1945	Succeeded by Unit absorbed into 26. Volksgrenadier-Division
Preceded by General der Kavallerie Edwin Graf von Rothkirch und Trach	Commander of LIII. Armeekorps; 6 March 1945 – 25 March 1945	Succeeded by Generalleutnant Fritz Bayerlein
Preceded by General der Panzertruppe Walter Krüger	Commander of LVIII. Panzerkorps; 25 March 1945 – April 1945	Succeeded by None
