= Günther Hoffmann-Schönborn =

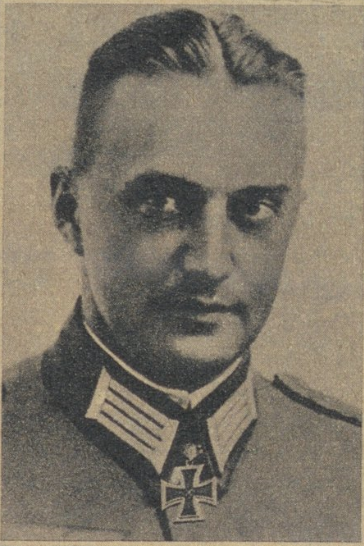
- Major Günter Hoffmann-Schoenborn
- Born: 1 May 1905
- Died: 4 April 1970 (aged 64)
- Military career
- Allegiance: Weimar Republic; Nazi Germany
- Branch: Army
- Service years: 1924–45
- Rank: Generalmajor
- Commands: 18th Volksgrenadier Division; 5th Panzer Division
- Conflicts: World War II
- Awards: Knight's Cross of the Iron Cross with Oak Leaves

Günther Hoffmann-Schönborn (1 May 1905 – 4 April 1970) was a general in the Wehrmacht of Nazi Germany during World War II. He was a recipient of the Knight's Cross of the Iron Cross with Oak Leaves.

== Awards ==
- Iron Cross (1939) 2nd Class (31 May 1940) & 1st Class (29 June 1940)
- Knight's Cross of the Iron Cross with Oak Leaves
  - Knight's Cross on 14 May 1941 as Major and commander of Sturm-Geschütz-Abteilung 191
  - 49th Oak Leaves on 31 December 1941 as Major and commander of Sturm-Geschütz-Abteilung 191

Military offices
Preceded by Generalleutnant Joachim von Tresckow	Commander of 18th Volksgrenadier Division; September 1944 – 5 February 1945	Succeeded by Generalleutnant Walter Botsch
Preceded by Generalmajor Rolf Lippert	Commander of 5th Panzer Division; 5 February 1945 – April 1945	Succeeded by Oberst der Reserve Hans Herzog
