= 328th =

328th may refer to:

- 328th Airlift Squadron
- 328th Armament Systems Wing
- 328th Ferrying Squadron
- 328th Fighter Squadron
- 328th Rifle Division
- 328th Weapons Squadron

== See also ==
- 328 (number)
- 328, the year 328 (CCCXXVIII) of the Julian calendar
- 328 BC
