= Ivan Pavlovsky =

Soviet military leader

Ivan Grigorievich Pavlovsky
- Иван Григорьевич Павловский
- Born: 24 February 1909; Russian Empire
- Died: 27 April 1999 (aged 90); Moscow, Russia
- Military career
- Allegiance: Soviet Union; Russia
- Branch: Red Army
- Service years: 1939–1986
- Rank: Army general
- Unit: Soviet Ground Forces
- Commands: Volga Military District
- Awards: Hero of the Soviet Union; Order of Zhukov; Order of Lenin; Order of the Red Banner; Order of Suvorov; Order of the Patriotic War; Order of the Red Star; Order "For Service to the Homeland in the Armed Forces of the USSR"; Medal "For Battle Merit"; Jubilee Medal "In Commemoration of the 100th Anniversary of the Birth of Vladimir Ilyich Lenin"; Medal "For the Defence of the Caucasus"

Ivan Grigorievich Pavlovsky (Russian: Ива́н Григо́рьевич Павло́вский) (24 February [O.S. 11 February] 1909 – 27 April 1999) was a Soviet military leader, Commander-in-Chief Ground Forces - Deputy Minister of Defence of the Soviet Union from 1967—1980, and a General of the Army (1967). He became a Hero of the Soviet Union in 1969. He was a Member of the Central Auditing Commission of the CPSU (1966—1971) and the Central Committee of the CPSU (1971—1981).

== Biography ==
He was born in the village of Teremkovtsy, Podolian Governorate, now part of Kamianets-Podilskyi Raion, Khmelnytskyi Oblast in Ukraine. By origin he was Ukrainian. In 1929 he graduated from an agricultural vocational school, since May he worked as an agronomist-field farmer of the Kamenetz-Podolsk district collective farm union, since September 1930 as a district agronomist Staro-Ushitskaya machine-tractor station.

During the Second World War Pavlovsky commanded the 328th Rifle Division, then after the war the 6th Rifle Corps in the North Caucasus Military District (1952–55). Pavlovsky, holding the rank of Army General, was appointed Commander-in-Chief of the Soviet Ground Forces with effect from 5 November 1967.

In August 1968, according to his own recollections, Army General Pavlovsky was summoned to see Minister of Defense of the USSR A.A. Grechko, who informed him of his appointment as commander of the combined forces of the Warsaw Pact states in the upcoming operation to send troops to Czechoslovakia after the Prague Spring. The Warsaw Pact invasion of Czechoslovakia ("Operation Danube") was carried out on August 20–21, 1968. In the evening of August 20, Eastern Bloc armies from four Warsaw Pact countries – the Soviet Union, Bulgaria, Poland and Hungary – invaded Czechoslovakia. That night, 250,000 Warsaw Pact troops and 2,000 tanks entered the country. National People's Army troops from East Germany also entered, but did not stay long. The total number of invading troops may have reached 500,000; and 5,000 tanks and armoured vehicles were used.

Six months later, by a decree of the Presidium of the Supreme Soviet of the USSR of February 21, 1969, Army General I. G. Pavlovsky was awarded the title Hero of the Soviet Union. Formally, the decree spoke of Pavlovsky's courage and heroism during the Great Patriotic War, as well as the merits in the construction and strengthening of the Armed Forces of the Soviet Union.

From August to November 1979, Pavlovsky travelled to Afghanistan as part of a high-ranking Soviet mission. In addition to the official task of providing assistance to reorganise the Afghan Army, Pavlovsky studied the situation in the country before the entry of Soviet troops into Afghanistan. Based on the results of the work, he provided the Minister of Defense of the USSR D.F. Ustinov and the Chief of the General Staff N.V. Ogarkov with a written report with categorical objections to the entry of Soviet troops into Afghanistan, then he also defended his point of view in personal reports. As a result, the High Command of the Ground Forces was removed from the development of the operation to send troops to Afghanistan, and Pavlovsky himself was removed from his post a few months later.

Pavlovsky died in Moscow on 27 April 1999.

== Works ==
- "Sukhoputnye voĭska SSSR : zarozhdenie, razvitie, sovremennost" [Land forces of the USSR: origin, development, modernity] by I. G Pavlovskiĭ, 1985
- "Sukhoputnye voĭska" [Land forces] by I. G Pavlovskiĭ, 1977

Political offices
Preceded by Vasily Chuikov	Commander-in-Chief of the Soviet Ground Forces; 1967–1980	Succeeded by Vasily Petrov
