= Wilhelm Behrens =

German general (1888–1968)

- Born: 23 August 1888
- Died: 15 August 1968 (aged 79)
- Military career
- Allegiance: German Empire; Weimar Republic; Nazi Germany
- Branch: Army
- Service years: 1908–1944
- Rank: Generalleutnant
- Commands: 328. Infanterie-Division; Division Nr. 193
- Conflicts: World War II
- Awards: Knight's Cross of the Iron Cross

Wilhelm Behrens (23 August 1888 – 15 August 1968) was a German general in the Wehrmacht during World War II who commanded several divisions. He was a recipient of the Knight's Cross of the Iron Cross of Nazi Germany. Behrens was discharged from active service in 1944; in 1946 he was arrested by Soviet authorities and interned until 1949.

== Awards and decorations ==
- German Cross in Gold on 9 December 1941 as Oberst in Infanterie-Regiment 106
- Knight's Cross of the Iron Cross on 17 March 1942 as Oberst and commander of Infanterie-Regiment 106

Military offices
Preceded by Generalleutnat Albert Fett	Commander of 328. Infanterie-Division; 30 December 1941 - 10 January 1942	Succeeded by Generalleutnant Joachim von Tresckow
Preceded by Generalmajor Paul Löhning	Commander of Division Nr. 193; 1 June 1942 - 1 June 1944	Succeeded by Generalmajor Eckkard von Geyso
