= 328th Infantry Division =

The 328th Infantry Division (German: 328. Infanterie-Division) was the name of two distinct infantry divisions of the German army during World War II. The first, simply dubbed 328th Infantry Division, existed between 1941 and 1943, while the second, designated 328th Infantry Division "Zealand" (German: 328. Infanterie-Division „Seeland"), existed for just under two months in 1945.

== Operational history ==
=== 328th Infantry Division (1941–1943) ===
328th Infantry Division
- German: 328. Infanterie-Division
- Active: 19 December 1941 – 2 November 1943
- Country: Nazi Germany
- Branch: Heer
- Type: Infantry
- Size: Division
- Engagements: Eastern Front; Case Anton

Commanders
- Commander: Albert Fett; Wilhelm Behrens; Joachim von Tresckow; Karl Böttcher

The 328th Infantry Division was formed as a so-called valkyrie division of the seventeenth deployment wave on 19 December 1941. By 2 January 1942, the division was deployed at Mielau and consisted of Infantry Regiments 547 through 549 with two battalions each (for a total of six infantry battalions) as well as the Artillery Regiment 328 with two detachments and the Division Units 328. Albert Fett was briefly assigned as divisional commander, before Wilhelm Behrens took command on 30 December 1941. He was in turn succeeded by Joachim von Tresckow, who (except for a brief interruption by Karl Böttcher in May 1943) commanded the 328th Infantry Division for the rest of its existence.

The 328th marched on foot from Suwałki into the rear area of Army Group Centre on the Eastern Front, where Infantry Regiment 547 was detached from the division along with 1st Bn Artillery Regiment 328. The two formations did not return to the division and were integrated into the 83rd Infantry Division on 11 February 1943.

In October 1942, the 328th Infantry Division was redeployed from the Zubtsov sector, where it had been heavily battered by Red Army troops, to German-occupied France. There, it was reinforced by upgrading the regiments 548 and 549 (now designated grenadier regiments) with a third battalion, as well as by forming an all-new three-battalion regiment in the form of Grenadier Regiment 569, bringing the division to a strength of nine infantry battalions. Artillery Regiment 328 was brought up to a strength of four batteries.

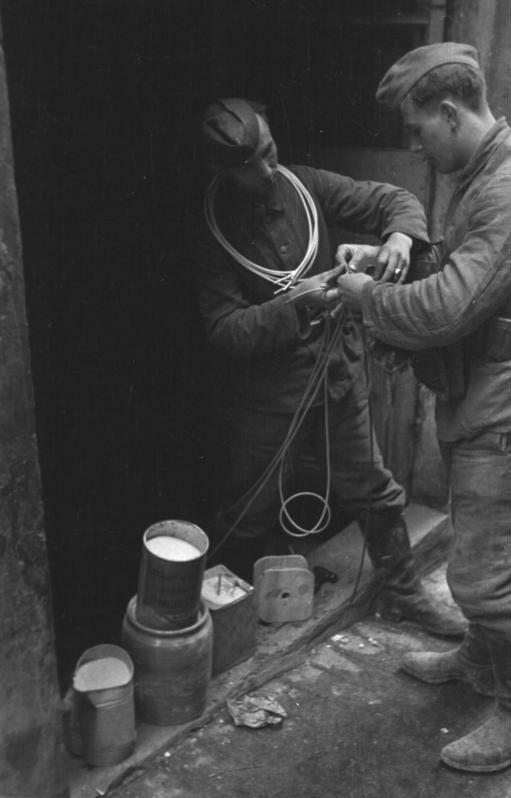
328th Division engineers prepare a detonation in the Marseille harbor district, 10 February 1943

In France, the division participated in Case Anton, the November 1942 German military occupation of the zone libre of Vichy France, and took over command of the Marseille sector, where it concerned itself with issues such as the establishment of military brothels.

The division was subsequently deployed to the Eastern Front again, where it took heavy damage over the course of the year 1943 and was eventually dissolved on 2 November 1943.

The remnants of the division were formed into Division Group 328 (German: Divisions-Gruppe 328), which was attached to the 306th Infantry Division. Subsequently, some former segments of the divisions were brought westwards to help form the 353rd Infantry Division.

Superior formations of 328th Infantry Division
Year	Month	Army Corps	Army	Army Group	Operational area
1941	12	None ("valkyrie division")			Mława
1942	1–3	Under OKH, redeploying to Army Group Centre			In transit
1942	4–6	Multiple	9th	AG Centre	Rzhev
1942	7	XXXXVI	9th	AG Centre	Rzhev
1942	8	VI	9th	AG Centre	Rzhev
1942	9	XXVII	9th	AG Centre	Rzhev
1942	10	Multiple	9th	AG Centre	Rzhev
1942	11–12	LXXXIII	Felber	AG D	Marseille
1943	1–5	LXXXIII	Felber	AG D	Marseille
1943	6	In transit	Kempf	AG South	Kharkiv
1943	7–9	LVII	1st Panzer	AG South	Izium
1943	10	LII	1st Panzer	AG South	Dnieper
1943	11	LVII	1st Panzer	AG South	Dnieper
1943	12	LVII (Div. Grp. 328)	1st Panzer	AG South	Dnieper

=== 328th Infantry Division "Zealand" (1945) ===
328th Infantry Division "Zealand"
- German: 328. Infanterie-Division „Seeland"
- Active: 9 March 1945 – 8 May 1945
- Country: Nazi Germany
- Branch: Heer
- Type: Infantry
- Size: Division
- Garrison/HQ: Copenhagen
- Engagements: World War II

The 328th Infantry Division "Zealand" was formed in German-occupied Denmark on 9 March 1945, using recovering wounded Wehrmacht personnel. These wounded soldiers had previously been organized in formations known as recoveree battalions D (German: Genesenden-Bataillone D), with the letter D indicating Denmark. It was to consist of three Grenadier Regiments (593, 594, 595) of three battalions each, as well as a newly-formed Artillery Regiment 328 of two batteries, and the Supply Regiment 328. The division was never battle-ready, as it was still in the process of deployment when Germany surrendered on 8 May 1945. Throughout its brief existence, the would-be division was headquartered at Copenhagen.

== Notable individuals ==
- Wilhelm Behrens: Divisional commander of the 328th Infantry Division from 30 December 1941 to 3 March 1942.
- Joachim von Tresckow: Divisional commander of the 328th Infantry Division from 3 March 1942 to 8 May 1943 and from 31 May 1943 to 2 November 1943. Went on to become commander of 18th Luftwaffe Field Division.
- Karl Böttcher: Divisional commander of the 328th Infantry Division from 8 May 1943 to 31 May 1943.
