= Front mobile group =

A front mobile group is a grouping of several tank armies as a primary armoured force of the Front commander for use in developing breakthroughs during an offensive, particularly in achieving strategic goals. Usually forming the second echelon, and employing from one to three tank armies, these were used with great success by the Red Army during the fighting on the Eastern Front of the Second World War. On occasion when either the tank army was unavailable, or the terrain was not suitable for the employment of large number of tanks and self-propelled artillery, only a cavalry mechanized group was used. The Front mobile group was usually used to deepen the penetration of the enemy front 70–100 km or more. The organisation of the Front mobile group was retained by the Soviet Army during the Cold War in the Group of Soviet Forces in Germany known as second echelon tank forces. The employment of the tank armies is intended to create a local numerical superiority on a narrow front of 3-5:1 in manpower, 6-8:1 in tanks and artillery, and 3-5:1 in Combat aircraft.
