= Hans-Georg Herzog =

WW2 German Army general (1912–1959)

- Born: 10 September 1912
- Died: 20 July 1959 (aged 46)
- Military career
- Allegiance: Nazi Germany
- Branch: Army
- Rank: Oberstleutnant of the Reserves
- Commands: 5th Panzer Division
- Conflicts: East Prussian Offensive
- Awards: Knight's Cross of the Iron Cross with Oak Leaves

Hans-Georg Herzog (10 September 1912 – 20 July 1959) was an officer in the Wehrmacht of Nazi Germany during World War II who commanded the 5th Panzer Division. He was a recipient of the Knight's Cross of the Iron Cross with Oak Leaves.

Herzog surrendered to the Red Army troops in the course of the Soviet 1945 East Prussian Offensive. Convicted in the Soviet Union as a war criminal, he was held until 1955.

== Awards and decorations ==
- Iron Cross (1939) 2nd Class (14 June 1940) & 1st Class (29 April 1941)
- Honour Roll Clasp of the Army (27 September 1943)
- German Cross in Gold on 30 July 1942 as Oberleutnant in the 1./Schützen-Regiment 13
- Knight's Cross of the Iron Cross with Oak Leaves
  - Knight's Cross on 6 April 1944 as Major of the Reserves and commander of II./Panzer-Grenadier-Regiment 14
  - Oak Leaves on 23 March 1945 as Oberstleutnant of the Reserves and commander of Panzergrenadier-Regiment 14
