= Heinz Kokott =

German general (1900–1976)

- Born: 14 November 1900; Groß Strehlitz
- Died: 29 May 1976 (aged 75); Traunstein
- Military career
- Allegiance: German Empire; Weimar Republic; Nazi Germany
- Branch: Army
- Rank: Generalmajor
- Commands: 26. Volksgrenadier-Division
- Conflicts: World War II
- Awards: Knight's Cross of the Iron Cross

Heinz Kokott (14 November 1900 – 29 May 1976) was a German general in the Wehrmacht during World War II. He was a recipient of the Knight's Cross of the Iron Cross of Nazi Germany.

In December 1944, during the Battle of the Bulge, Kokott commanded the 26th Volksgrenadier Division, which was tasked with completing the capture of Bastogne after American forces had been encircled, while the panzer divisions that broke through the American lines continued westward toward the Meuse River.

After his capture at the end of the war, Kokott's interrogations became an important source for the German perspective of the Siege of Bastogne:

S.L.A. Marshall published a book in 1946 (title: BASTOGNE - The First Eight Days). It can be read as Public Domain. The book has an appendix; here is a quote from it:

.. if the full importance of all that happened in the first days of the Bastogne defense is to be accurately measured by history, the witnesses must speak from the opposing camp.

In November and December 1945 there took place a series of conferences between the three chief actors in the attack on Bastogne and the author of the Bastogne story. Present were Lieutenant General Heinrich von Lüttwitz, Commanding General of the XXXXVII Panzer Corps, Lieutenant General Fritz Hermann Bayerlein, Commanding General of the Panzer Lehr Division, and Major General Heinz Kokott, Commanding General of the 26th Volksgrenadier Division. Colonel Meinhard von Lauchert, the commander of the 2d Panzer Division, was not present nor was his presence deemed necessary. Of the three divisions, the 2d Panzer had had least to do with the direct attack on Bastogne; and further, the Corps commander, having formerly commanded that division and having a sentimental feeling for it and not too much faith in Von Lauchert, had directly supervised its operation during the German advance. With what at least appeared to be utmost candor, the three enemy commanders proceeded to discuss all that had happened to them.

There were in all ten conferences on these matters, during which the commanders worked with all of the necessary maps and such staff notes as were available to them. Inasmuch as the data on the American operation were already complete, it was easy to provide the check points which would establish the accuracy of their story in all particulars. Colonel H. W. O. Kinnard, who had been G-3 of the 101st Airborne Division during the Bastogne operation, also attended these interrogations. The meeting with Kinnard was a visible shock to the German commanders. It seemed incredible to them that this boyish-faced soldier had been one of their principal antagonists. They asked several times for reassurance on this score. Lüttwitz said, "Are you certain he was chief of operations? Isn't it possible that he was only the chief for one regiment?"

... Kokott is a shy, scholarly and dignified commander who never raises his voice and appears to be temperate in his actions and judgments. Now past fifty-two, he is doubtless the steadiest man of the three. In his account of battle, he is strictly objective. He shares Bayerlein's opinion of Lüttwitz but is more amused than resentful. Better than any other commander, he saw the true situation at Bastogne though he also made his share of mistakes, as the record shows. He felt, even more strongly than the others, that adherence to the original plan at Bastogne became unwise on December 19 but he is a natural optimist and he expected to win the battle.

== Awards and decorations ==
- Knight's Cross of the Iron Cross on 17 March 1943 as Oberst and commander of Grenadier-Regiment 337

Military offices
Preceded by Generalleutnant Johannes de Boer	Commander of 26. Volksgrenadier-Division; 10 August 1944 - April 1945	Succeeded by None
