= 5th Panzer Division (Wehrmacht) =

German army division during World War II

- 5. Panzer-Division; — 5. PzDiv — XX
- Unit insignia from 1941
- Active: 15 November 1938 – 8 May 1945
- Country: Nazi Germany
- Branch: German Army
- Type: Panzer
- Role: Armoured warfare
- Size: Division
- Part of: Wehrmacht
- Garrison/HQ: Wehrkreis VIII: Oppeln
- Engagements: World War II; Invasion of Poland; Battle of France; Battle of Greece; Operation Barbarossa; Battle of Moscow; Battles of Rzhev; Operation Bagration; East Prussian offensive

Insignia
- 1940

- 1941–1945

- at Kursk

The 5th Panzer Division (English: 5th Tank Division) was an armoured division of the German Army during World War II, established in 1938.

The division fought in Poland, France, the Balkans and in the Soviet Union; first as part of Army Group Centre (1941–44) and then Army Group North. The division surrendered to Soviet and Western Allied forces in April and May 1945.

== History ==
The 5th Panzer Division was formed in Oppeln, now Opole in Poland, on 15 November 1938 as part of a second wave of new armoured divisions in Germany following the creation of the original three tank divisions in 1935. Alongside the 5th Panzer Division the 4th had been formed in Würzburg five days earlier. The personnel of the division was mainly made up of Silesians and Sudeten Germans, the Sudetenland having been annexed by Germany shortly before.

The division took part in the invasion of Poland in 1939 but played no major role in it, being part of the southern thrust of the German advance towards Lwów and taking part in the Battle of Lwow. The 5th Panzer Division played a much greater role in the German invasion of France and Belgium. It took part in the battle of Belgium, advanced towards Lille and participated in the Battle of Dunkirk. It continued its advance south, took Brest on 19 June and continued on towards the French-Spanish border. The division remained in France until January 1941. During this time, in September 1940, it lost one of its two tank regiments to the newly created 11th Panzer Division in an effort to increase the number of German tank divisions that, in turn, slightly weakened the existing ones.

The 5th Panzer Division was sent to Romania and Bulgaria in early 1941 and took part in the German invasion of Yugoslavia and Greece. It advanced through southern Yugoslavia and into Greece and was engaged in heavy fighting against the 2nd New Zealand Division. After the end of the Greek campaign the division was sent to the north to participate in the German invasion of the Soviet Union, Operation Barbarossa, in which the 5th Panzer Division took part in the advance on Moscow. Coming within 34 km of the city the division was forced to retreat after the Soviet counterattack in December 1941 and remained in a defensive position throughout the winter of 1941–1942. It did not take part in the German advance on the Caucasus and the Volga, Case Blue, instead remaining with the Army Group Center and being engaged in defensive battles.

The division did not actively participate in the German offensive during the Battle of Kursk but was involved in defensive battles after the failure of the former. For the remainder of the war the division continued to retreat and fight in defensive battles on the Eastern Front in Poland, briefly in Courland and East Prussia. It was trapped on the Samland peninsula in April 1945 and parts of the division were evacuated by the German Navy, thereby being able to surrender to the Western Allies at the end of the war. The remainder surrendered to Soviet forces in April 1945.

Throughout the fighting on the Eastern Front the division was seen as one of the best German units by their Soviet counterparts. Up until July 1944, when Operation Bagration caused the destruction of the German Army Group Center, the Soviet High Command advised against directly engaging the division if possible.

== Commanding officers ==
The commanders of the division:

- Generalleutnant Heinrich von Vietinghoff (2 September 1939 – 8 October 1939)
- Generalleutnant Max von Hartlieb-Walsporn (8 October 1939 – 29 May 1940)
- General der Panzertruppen Joachim Lemelsen (29 May 1940 – 25 November 1940)
- General der Panzertruppe Gustav Fehn (25 November 1940 – 10 August 1942)
- Generalleutnant Eduard Metz (10 August 1942 – 1 February 1943)
- Generalmajor Johannes Nedtwig (1 February 1943 – 20 June 1943)
- Generalleutnant Ernst Felix Fäckenstedt (20 June 1943 – 7 September 1943)
- General der Panzertruppe Karl Decker (7 September 1943 – 16 October 1944)
- Generalmajor Rolf Lippert (16 October 1944 – 5 February 1945)
- Generalmajor Günther Hoffmann-Schönborn (5 February 1945 – April 1945)
- Oberst der Reserve Hans-Georg Herzog (April 1945)

== Organisation ==
The organisation of the division:

France – 1940	Eastern Front – 1943
Panzer-Brigade 8; Panzer-Regiment 15; Panzer-Regiment 31	Panzer-Regiment 31
Schützen-Brigade 5; Schützen-Regiment 13; Schützen-Regiment 14	Panzergrenadier-Regiment 13; Panzergrenadier-Regiment 14
Aufklärungs-Abteilung 8	Panzer-Aufklärungs-Abteilung 5
Artillerie-Regiment 116	Panzer-Artillerie-Regiment 116
Panzerjäger-Abteilung 53	Panzerjäger-Abteilung 53
	Heeres-Flak-Artillerie-Abteilung 288
Pionier-Bataillon 89	Panzer-Pionier-Bataillon 89
Nachrichten-Abteilung 77	Panzer-Nachrichten-Abteilung 77
Nachschubtruppen 85	Panzer-Versorgungstruppen 85
