= 26th Infantry Division (Wehrmacht) =

26th Infantry Division (1936 – 1944) 26th Volksgrenadier Division (1944 – 1945)
- 26. Infanterie-Division; 26. Volksgrenadier-Division
- Active: 1 April 1936 – 10 September 1944; 17 September 1944 – 1945
- Country: Nazi Germany
- Branch: Army
- Type: Infantry (1936-1944); Volksgrenadier (1944-1945)
- Size: Division
- Engagements: World War II

The 26th Infantry Division (German: 26. Infanterie-Division) was a pre-World War II German Infantry Division of the 1st mobilisation wave (1. Welle). It was mobilised for World War II on September 26, 1939, disbanded on September 10, 1944, near Radom and reformed as the 26th Volksgrenadier Division (26. Volksgrenadier-Division) on September 17, 1944, near Poznań by absorption of the new 582nd Volksgrenadier Division of the 32nd mobilisation wave (32. Welle). Remnants of the Division entered U.S. captivity in the Harz region in 1945.

== Commanding officers ==
- General der Infanterie Sigismund von Förster, 1 September 1939
- Generaloberst Walter Weiß, 15 January 1941
- General der Infanterie Friedrich Wiese, 15 April 1942
- Generalleutnant Johannes de Boer, 5 August 1943
- Generalmajor Heinz Kokott, 10 August 1944

== Operational history ==
The 26th Infantry Division spent the early war years on the Western Front, taking part in the Battle of France in May/June 1940, first under the command of the Sixteenth Army (16. Armee) and later the Twelfth Army. The division was transferred to the Eastern Front in June 1941 to serve under Army Group Centre (Heeresgruppe Mitte). It participated in the Battle of Kursk in July 1943. After this action the 26th Infantry Division absorbed the 174th Reserve Division (174. Reserve-Division). The division was disbanded after casualties were sustained near Kovel on September 10, 1944; surviving troops were transferred to the 253rd Infantry Division (253. Infanterie-Division).

A new 26th Volksgrenadier Division was formed on September 17, 1944, in the Warthelager (now Biedrusko in west central Poland), near Poznań by absorption of the 582nd Volksgrenadier Division and remnants of the old 26th Infantry Division. This new division spent the rest of the war on the Western Front under Army Group B (Heeresgruppe B) until it entered U.S. captivity in the Harz in 1945.

== Organisation ==
=== 1939 ===
- Infanterie-Regiment 39, I-III Battalions
- Infanterie-Regiment 77, I-III Battalions
- Infanterie-Regiment 78, I-III Battalions
- Artillerie-Regiment 26, I-III Battalions plus the Ist Battalion of Artillerie-Regiment 62
- Aufklärungs-Abteilung 26
- Panzerjäger-Abteilung 26
- Pionier-Abteilung 26
- Infanterie-Divisions-Nachrichten-Abteilung 26
- Feldersatz-Bataillon 26

=== 1944 ===
- Füsilier Regiment 39, I and II Battalions
- Grenadier Regiment 77, I and II Battalions
- Füsilier Regiment 78, I and II Battalions
- Artillerie-Regiment 26, I-IV Battalions
- Divisions-Füsilier-Kompanie 26 (later expanded to Füsilier-Bataillon 26)
- Panzer-Jäger-Abteilung 26
- Pionier-Abteilung 26
- Infanterie-Divisions-Nachrichten-Abteilung 26
- Feldersatz-Bataillon 26

== See also ==
- 26th Division (German Empire) for the eponymous division in the First World War
