= 328th Rifle Division =

328th Rifle Division (August 26, 1941 – May 24, 1942) 328th Rifle Division (August 4, 1942 – July 1945)
- Active: 1941–1945
- Country: Soviet Union
- Branch: Red Army
- Type: Infantry
- Size: Division
- Engagements: Battle of Moscow; Battle of the Caucasus; Battle of the Dniepr; Operation Bagration; Vistula-Oder Offensive; East Pomeranian Offensive; Berlin Strategic Offensive Operation
- Decorations: Order of the Red Banner (2nd Formation)
- Battle honours: Warsaw (2nd Formation)

Commanders
- Notable commanders: Col. Pyotr Antonovich Yeremin; Col. Porfirii Martinovich Gudz; Col. Nikolai Ivanovich Petunin; Col. Ivan Pavlovsky

The 328th Rifle Division was formed as a standard Red Army rifle division at Yaroslavl late in the summer of 1941, as part of the massive buildup of new Soviet fighting formations in response to the German invasion. Like several other divisions in the 320-330 series, it was neither fully trained nor equipped when thrown into the Soviet winter counteroffensive as part of 10th Army, but did its part in throwing back the forces of German Army Group Center from the southern approaches to Moscow in December and January. Over the course of five months of nearly continual offensive combat the soldiers of the division distinguished themselves sufficiently to be re-designated as the 31st Guards Rifle Division. A few months later a new 328th was formed, this time in the Transcaucasus Military District as the German summer offensive of 1942 was producing a crisis in that region. This new division had a slow start, but eventually proved itself in fighting through Ukraine, Belarus and Poland, gaining a battle honor for the liberation of Warsaw, and helping to complete the encirclement of Berlin in April 1945. Despite this record, it was disbanded shortly after the German surrender.

== 1st Formation ==
The 328th Rifle Division began forming in the Yaroslavl area of the Moscow Military District on August 26, 1941. Its first commander, Col. Pyotr Antonovich Yeremin, was appointed the same day. At the time it was formed the personnel of the division were noted as being 90 percent of Russian nationality. The basic order of battle of the division was as follows:

- 1103rd Rifle Regiment
- 1105th Rifle Regiment
- 1107th Rifle Regiment
- 889th Artillery Regiment

The division was assigned to 10th Reserve Army in October, which deployed to confront the advance of forces of German Army Group Center against Moscow's southern flank. On November 29 the 328th had reached the area of Turlatovo and Vygorodok. At this time it was in better shape than many other divisions in its Army, being outfitted with its main types of weapons, while still lacking certain weaponry and motor transport. Just prior to the start of the Soviet counteroffensive on December 5 the division was at Redino. On the next day the Army was subordinated to Western Front and ordered to attack in the direction of Mikhailov and Stalinogorsk.

=== Battle of Moscow ===
The joint attack on Mikhailov began on December 6; the 328th fought east of the town while the 330th and 323rd Rifle Divisions moved to bypass it from the north and southeast respectively. On December 10 and 11, Western Front ordered 10th Army to continue its advance towards Plavsk, and the Army further ordered its right-flank divisions, including the 328th, to reach the line Uzlovaya station - Bogoroditsk - Kuzovka by the morning of December 12. On the 11th the division reached the Don River along the Bobriki - Mikhailovka sector, encountering strong resistance, which was broken by December 13. During this first stage of the offensive the 328th had advanced at a rate of about nine km per day. On the morning of the 14th the offensive resumed and the 328th and 330th both crossed the Uzlovaya - Bogoroditsk railroad and continued attacking to the west. Plavsk was occupied, and the next objectives for 10th Army were the towns of Belyov and Kozelsk. By the end of December 21 the division had reached the sector Korenevka - Bulandino. As of December 25 it had been subordinated to 1st Guards Cavalry Corps and was moving towards the Oka River in support of the Corps' attack on Belyov.

December 27 found the division advancing north of Belyov, fighting elements of the German 112nd and 167th Infantry Divisions covering the town in that direction. Two days later the division was re-subordinated directly to 10th Army, and began bypassing enemy strongpoints, moving along the route Pashkovo - Karacheevo to get into the flank and rear of the German Belyov grouping. On December 30 it began its direct assault on the town and played the leading role in its liberation, with help from the 330th and 322nd Rifle Divisions. The next day, as the latter unit mopped up Belyov, the 328th and 330th continued advancing west and northwest, but were soon redirected to the Kozelsk area as 10th Army consolidated. In the first days of January 1942, the Army was directed to cut the Vyasma - Bryansk railroad and liberate several towns, including Kirov and Zhizdra.

As this new phase of the counteroffensive began on January 5 the 328th was held in 10th Army's second echelon in the Kozelsk area, and then was to move to Mekhovoe, where the Army headquarters was located. The division had taken heavy casualties in the fight for Belyov, and was now serving as the Army reserve. 324th Rifle Division was blockading the town of Sukhinichi in mid-January, and the depleted 328th was the only force available to reinforce the siege lines as the Germans were also reinforced. German Army Group Center began to receive reinforcements from occupied France which allowed them to launch a counterattack to relieve its besieged troops on January 18. Part of the Sukhinichi garrison was extracted by the German relief force and the town was finally liberated on January 29. Fighting by both sides persisted into February with mixed success.

Later that month the 328th was transferred to 16th Army, in the same Front, and it continued fighting in the area of Sukhinichi over the next few months. On April 7, Colonel Yeremin handed his command over to Col. Porfirii Martinovich Gudz, who would lead the division for the remainder of its 1st formation. On May 24, for its courage and heroism the division was redesignated as the 31st Guards Rifle Division.

== 2nd Formation ==
The GLAVKOM (High Command) issued an order on July 29, 1942, that the division was to be reformed, and this began on August 4, at Beslan and Ordzhonikidze in the Transcaucasus Military District. Its first commander, Col. Nikolai Ivanovich Petunin, was assigned on the same date. Its basic order of battle remained the same as the 1st formation, with the following additions:

- 295th Antitank Battalion
- 606th Sapper Battalion
- 388th Reconnaissance Company
- 446th Signal Company
- 404th Chemical Defense Company
- 411th Medical/Sanitation Battalion

At the time it was formed the division was noted as having 50 - 60 percent personnel of Caucasian nationalities, mostly Armenian.

=== Battle of the Caucasus ===
At the time the STAVKA was reacting to the advances by German Army Group A into the Caucasus region. The new 66th Army was to be formed from Soviet forces already in the Terek River valley and additional forces from Transcaucasus Front, including the 328th when it was ready for service. As the panzers continued advancing towards Mozdok on August 23 further orders arrived to form a new 24th Army to defend the Makhachkala region, consisting of the 328th, 337th and 317th Rifle Divisions, the Makhachkala NKVD Rifle Division and the 3rd Rifle Brigade; further orders a few days later redesignated this as 58th Army. In September the division was again reassigned, now to the 18th Army in the Black Sea Group of Forces.

On September 23, the German 17th Army began an offensive (Operation Attika) through the high passes of the Caucasus mountains towards the Black Sea port of Tuapse. At this time the 328th was in 18th Army reserves, along with 11th Guards Cavalry Division, 145th Naval Infantry Regiment and 40th Motorized Rifle Brigade. The German attack made fairly slow progress through this difficult terrain, but by September 29 had made gains that forced command changes in the Soviet forces and the commitment of the 328th and the 40th Brigade to shore up 18th Army's center and right flank. Further instructions from the STAVKA on October 2 ordered:

"... an attack with 119th Rifle Brigade, one regiment of 328th Rifle Division, and part of 68th Rifle Brigade, and 14th Naval Rifle Regiment from the Belaia Glina region toward Pervomaiskii, Khadyshenskii, and Gurievskii to destroy the enemy grouping which has penetrated towards Paportnyi and Kurinskii (101st and 97th Jäger Divisions)."

Meanwhile, the balance of the division was to continue to help defend the Khadyshenskii - Tuapse road. In the event this attack was preempted by a German attack on the day before, but the Soviet defenses brought the German advance to a halt on October 9, barely short of the road.

A renewal of the offensive on October 21 smashed the 408th Rifle Division and forced its remnants to break out and retreat; by this point 17th Army's leading troops were just 30km from their goal. On October 24 the Slovak Motorized Division of LVII Panzer Corps attacked westward north of the Tuapse road towards Mount Sarai, and captured it from 68th Rifle Brigade. However, a counterattack by the 328th and the 32nd Guards Rifle Division against the Slovaks' flanks broke up their advance, and the positions of the 68th Brigade were retaken. The complex fighting in this region went on until early November until it was brought to a halt by attrition, exhaustion, and the onset of winter weather.

At the end of the year the division was withdrawn from 18th Army to the reserves of the Black Sea Group. On January 13, 1943, as the German forces withdrew from the Caucasus and the Red Army advanced, the 889th Artillery Regiment was "swapped" for the 687th Artillery Regiment from 236th Rifle Division. The regiment continued as the 687th until August, when it was redesignated back to the 889th. From February to May 1943, the division was in the reserves of North Caucasus Front, eventually being assigned to the new 10th Rifle Corps. It was in this Front and this Corps when it was assigned to 56th Army in May.

== Into Ukraine and Belarus ==
On May 6, Colonel Petunin handed his command over to Col. Ivan Pavlovsky, who would remain in command for the duration of the war. This officer would go on to serve as Commander-in-Chief of Soviet Ground Forces from 1964 to 1980. In August the 328th left the Caucasus and came under the command of 51st Army in Southern Front, but in September was moved to the Reserve of the Supreme High Command. While there, both its 889th Artillery Regiment and 295th Antitank Battalion were completely reequipped with ZIS-3 76mm guns. Following this, the division was assigned to the 107th Rifle Corps in the 1st Guards Army of the 1st Ukrainian Front. On February 22, 1944, it was moved to 47th Army in 2nd Belorussian Front; it would remain in that Army for the duration of the war. In April, 47th Army was reassigned to 1st Belorussian Front, and the 328th remained in that Front for the duration. At the beginning of June the division was in 129th Rifle Corps, but when Operation Bagration began on June 22/23 it was serving as a separate division. 47th Army was on the left flank of 1st Belorussian Front, in the area of Kovel, and so played no role in the initial stages of the offensive. It was committed to the battle in July, and on August 9 the 328th was recognized for its role in the liberation of that city with the Order of the Red Banner.

== Into Germany ==
In November 1944, the breakdown of nationalities in the division was recorded as 75 percent Belorussian, 20 percent Ukrainian and five percent Russian. During the Vistula - Oder Offensive the division was serving in the 77th Rifle Corps and was recognized for its role in the liberation of the Polish capital by receiving its name as a battle honor:

"WARSAW - ... 328th Rifle Division (Colonel Pavlovskii, Ivan Grigorevich)... The troops who participated in the battles for the liberation of Warsaw, by order of the Supreme Commander-in-Chief on January 17, 1945, and a commendation in Moscow, are granted a salute of 24 artillery salvoes from 324 guns."

On the following day the 1103rd Rifle Regiment (Col. Grigorii Saveryanovich Cheprunov) was granted its own battle honor for taking part in the liberation of Sochaczew. On April 5 the same regiment was awarded the Order of the Red Banner, while the 1105th Rifle Regiment received the Order of Aleksandr Nevski, both for their roles in the fighting for Deutsch Krone and the nearby area. At noon on April 25, alongside 65th Guards Tank Brigade of 2nd Guards Tank Army, the division established the first junction of 1st Belorussian Front with 1st Ukrainian Front west of Berlin, completing the outer encirclement of the German capital. It was disbanded "in place" with the Group of Soviet Forces in Germany during the summer of 1945.
