= 18th Luftwaffe Field Division =

18. Luftwaffen-Feld-Division; 18th Luftwaffe Field Division
- Active: 1943-1945
- Country: Nazi Germany
- Branch: Luftwaffe
- Type: Infantry
- Engagements: World War II: Western Front

The 18th Luftwaffe Field Division (German: 18. Luftwaffen-Feld-Division) was an infantry division of the Luftwaffe branch of Nazi Germany's Wehrmacht during the Second World War. It was set up on 1 December 1942 from surplus Luftwaffe personnel and was deployed in France from February 1943 to September 1943. On September 20, 1943, the division was transferred to the army and renamed Field Division 18 (L).

== See also ==
- Luftwaffe Field Divisions

== Bibliography ==
- Stout, Michael J. (2026). Goering's Ground Troops: The Luftwaffe Field Divisions of World War II. Naval Institute Press. ISBN 978-1-68247-977-3.
