= 3rd Mechanized Corps (1940 formation) =

- Active: June 1940 – June 1941
- Country: Soviet Union
- Branch: Red Army
- Type: Mechanized corps
- Size: 669 (June 20) / 651 tanks (22 June 1941); 224 armored cars (20 June 1941); 31,975 men (22 June 1941)
- Engagements: Battle of Raseiniai

Commanders
- Notable commanders: Andrey Yeryomenko; Alexey Kurkin

The 3rd Mechanized Corps (Russian: 3-й механизированный корпус) was a mechanized corps of the Red Army. Formed in June 1940 during World War II, the corps was stationed in Soviet-occupied Lithuania under the Baltic Special Military District. The corps was destroyed in late June 1941 during the Battle of Raseiniai, one of the initial battles of Operation Barbarossa.

== Formation ==
The 3rd Mechanized Corps began forming in June 1940 in the Western Special Military District, just after the Soviet occupation of the Baltic states. Responsibility for the formation of the corps was soon shifted to the newly created Baltic Special Military District. The headquarters and corps troops were formed at Vilnius from those of the 24th Rifle Corps, and the motorcycle regiment from the 123rd Cavalry Regiment of the 7th Cavalry Division. Its 2nd Tank Division was formed at Yanov from the 7th Cavalry Division, although its tank regiment was created by combining a tank battalion from the 21st Heavy Tank Brigade, the 7th Cavalry Division tank regiment, and a rifle division tank battalion. Its 5th Tank Division was formed at Prienai and Alytus primarily from the 2nd Light Tank Brigade with a tank battalions of the 21st Heavy Tank Brigade from Minsk and the 121st Rifle Division used to complete its tank battalions. The howitzer and motor rifle regiments of the division were formed from the howitzer regiment and the 344th Rifle Regiment of the 84th Rifle Division. The remainder of the 84th Rifle Division was reorganized at Vilnius as its 84th Motorized Division, whose tank regiment was formed from the tank battalions of the 84th, 113th, and 143rd Rifle Divisions.

The formation of the corps suffered from several difficulties. There was a shortage of barracks and officer housing in Vilnius. Furthermore, other than the 2nd Light Tank Brigade, the units used to form the corps were not appropriately equipped, being a disparate collection ranging from separate tank battalions, sapper companies, and cavalry units, among others. Despite these handicaps, the first corps commander, General Andrey Yeryomenko, competently organized the training of the divisions of the corps, and at a December meeting of senior commanders the corps was ranked first in readiness among mechanized corps. That month, Yeryomenko was sent to Moscow and succeeded by Major General Alexey Kurkin. During the same period, 2nd Tank Division commander Major General Semyon Krivoshein was succeeded by Yegor Solyankin, and Colonel Fyodor Fyodorov succeeded Kurkin as commander of the 5th Tank Division. At the time, Fyodorov was in Moscow for a command improvement course, leaving Colonel Pavel Rotmistrov in command until his return in May 1941. By June, the corps was engaged in training at firing ranges in summer camps.

On 20 June, two days before the beginning of Operation Barbarossa, the German invasion of the Soviet Union, the corps had a total of 669 tanks and 224 BA-10 and BA-20 armored cars. However, the majority of its tanks were obsolete, including 431 BT-7 and 41 T-26 light tanks and 57 T-28 medium tanks. The 2nd Tank Division had all 32 KV-1 and nineteen KV-2 tanks in the corps while the 5th Tank Division had all of its 50 T-34 tanks. The 84th Motorized Division was solely equipped with BT-7s. Before war broke out, the 2nd Tank Division was at Ukmergė, the 5th Tank Division at Alytus with its motor rifle regiment at Prienai, and the 84th Motorized Division at Vilnius. On 22 June 1941, the 3rd Mechanized Corps had 31,975 men & 651 tanks, of which 110 were new T-34 and KV-1 types.

In response to signs of the impending invasion, all units of the corps were alerted on 18 June and left their permanent bases. The corps was deployed as follows: the 2nd Tank Division in the region of Gaižiūnai and Rukla, the 5th Tank Division several kilometers south of Alytus, and the 84th Motorized Division in the forests near Kaišiadorys. The 84th took extra steps for readiness, issuing an order prohibiting fires at night. The corps headquarters also moved forward to Kaunas. District commander Fyodor Kuznetsov warned Kurkin of an impending German attack on 21 June, raising the corps to full combat readiness and ordering units out of camp into forests under the guise of exercises. However, Kuznetsov did not allow the corps to be concentrated, fearing that it could be destroyed by German attack while on the march. The corps headquarters under Kurkin and the 1st Motorcycle Regiment moved to Kėdainiai north of Kaunas. The corps lost the 5th Tank Division to the direct control of the 11th Army.

== Border battles ==
Thanks to the dispersion of the corps before the invasion, the first German airstrikes against its permanent bases struck empty barracks. However, the 11th Army took direct control of the 84th Motorized Division in midday of 22 June, leaving the corps with only the corps troops and the 2nd Tank Division for the rest of its operations. At 16:00, Solyankin received orders to concentrate his division in the Raseiniai area for a counterattack against the German breakthrough. Under the cover of darkness, the 2nd Tank Division reached Jonava. However, the vanguard of its 4th Tank Regiment was stopped there by refugees blocking the roads. Behind the 4th Tank Regiment, the 3rd Tank Regiment changed its route to cross the bridge over the Neris, proceeding along the route of Jonava, Raseiniai, and Tilsit. The division advanced along rural roads, avoiding German airstrikes by moving only at night and maintaining strict radio silence. Left with nothing but the corps motorcycle regiment, the corps headquarters joined the 2nd Tank Division on the night of 23 June. At the same time, Colonel Pavel Poluboyarov, head of the armored forces of the Northwestern Front (formed from the district on the outbreak of the war), tasked the corps with counterattacking to the west.

The Corps was heavily engaged in the first battles of Operation Barbarossa, particularly during the Baltic Operation (1941) and at the Battle of Raseiniai.

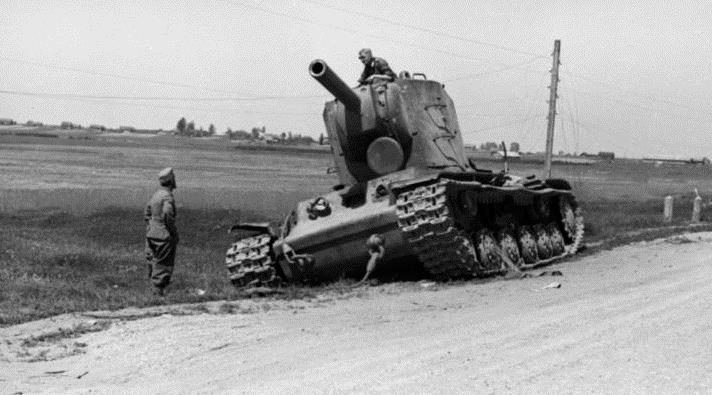
A KV-2 heavy tank similar to the one from 2nd Tank Division that held up 6th Panzer Division for one day

On 24 June 1941, a single KV-2 heavy tank of 2nd Tank Division, at a crossroads in front of Raseiniai, managed to cut off elements of the 6th Panzer Division which had established bridgeheads on the Dubysa. It stalled the Division's advance for a full day while being attacked by a variety of antitank weapons, until it finally ran out of ammunition. General Erhard Raus, the Officer commanding 6th Panzer Division's Kampfgruppe Raus, which was the unit held up by the lone vehicle, described the incident. Raus said that the vehicle was damaged by several shots from a 88mm anti-aircraft gun firing at the vehicle from behind whilst it was distracted by Panzer 35(t) tanks from Panzer Battalion 65. The crew were killed by grenades thrown by a Pioneer Engineer unit. The grenades were pushed through two holes made by the gun whilst the turret had started moving again, the other five or six shots having not apparently penetrated completely. The crew had remarkably only been apparently stunned by the shots which had entered the turret. Afterwards they were buried nearby with honours by the German soldiers of the unit held up.

However, by early July the Corps had virtually ceased to exist as a formation, though remnants rejoined Soviet lines later. For example, the 5th Tank Division was at Yelnya by 4 July 1941, and consisted of 2,552 men and a total of 2 BT-7 tanks and four armoured cars. The 2nd Tank Division was encircled and destroyed at Raseiniai. The remnants of the 5th Tank Division had been driven into the Western Front's area of control by 25 June, when a report by the front's General Staff said "the remains of Northwestern Front's 5th Tank Division are concentrated 5 kilometres south east of Molodechno; 3 tanks, 12 armored Cars, and 40 trucks." The 5th Tank Division was encircled and destroyed at the Battle of Białystok–Minsk and was disbanded shortly after.

On 11 July 1941 Colonel Pavel Poluboyarov, chief of the Northwestern Front armored directorate reported that the 3rd Mechanized Corps had 'completely perished' having only 400 men remaining who escaped encirclement with 2nd Tank Division & only 1 BT-7 tank.
