= 2nd Tank Division (Soviet Union) =

Division of the Red Army and Soviet Ground Forces

2nd Tank Division (c. 1939 – 1941) 2nd Tank Division (1946–1957)
- Active: 1939–1957
- Country: Soviet Union
- Branch: Red Army, Soviet Army
- Part of: Far East Military District
- Engagements: Harbin-Kirin Operation

Commanders
- Notable commanders: Yegor Solyankin

The 2nd Tank Division (2-я танковая дивизия) was a division of the Red Army and Soviet Ground Forces, which was formed twice under very different circumstances.

== First Formation ==
The 3rd Mechanised Corps was first formed in July 1940; on 22 June 1941, was stationed at Vilnius in the Baltic Military District under MG Alexey Kurkin. It consisted of 2nd Tank Division (Maj. Gen. Yegor Solyankin) 5th Tank Division, 84th Motorised Division, 15th Motorcycle Regiment, an artillery regiment, and engineer and signals battalions. On 22 June, the 2nd Tank Division was located in the forest in Gajzhuny, in the Ionava area. On 22 June 1941, the 3rd Mechanised Corps had 31,975 men & 651 tanks, of which 110 were new T-34 and KV-1 types.

The division was heavily engaged in the first battles of Operation Barbarossa, particularly during the Baltic Operation (1941) and at the Battle of Raseiniai.

On 23 June, Kampfgruppe Von Seckendorff of the German 6th Panzer Division, consisting of 114th Panzergrenadier Regiment (motorized infantry), Aufklärungsabteilung 57 (Panzer Reconnaissance Battalion 57), one company of Panzerjäger Battalion 41, and, that morning only, Motorcycle Battalion 6, was overrun by 2nd Tank Division near Skaudvilė. The German Panzer 35(t) tanks and antitank weapons were ineffective against the Soviet heavy KV-1 and KV-2 tanks—some of them were out of ammunition but closed in and destroyed German antitank guns by driving over them. The Germans concentrated on immobilising the Soviet tanks by firing at their tracks and then by tackling them with artillery, anti-aircraft guns, or by blowing them up with explosive charges of the sticky bomb type.

On 24 June 1941, a single KV-2 heavy tank of 2nd Tank Division, at a crossroads in front of Raseiniai, managed to cut off elements of the 6th Panzer Division which had established bridgeheads on the Dubysa. It stalled the Division's advance for a full day while being attacked by a variety of antitank weapons, until it finally ran out of ammunition. General Erhard Raus, the Officer commanding 6th Panzer Division's Kampfgruppe Raus, which was the unit held up by the lone vehicle, described the incident. Raus said that the vehicle was damaged by several shots from an 88 Anti-Tank Gun firing at the vehicle from behind whilst it was distracted by Panzer 35(t) tanks from Panzer Battalion 65 and the crew were killed by grenades from a Pioneer Engineer unit. The grenades were pushed through two holes made by the gun whilst the turret had started moving again, the other five or six shots having not apparently penetrated completely. The crew had remarkably only been apparently stunned by the shots which had entered the turret. Afterwards they were buried nearby with honours by the German soldiers of the unit held up.

The 2nd Tank Division was encircled and destroyed at Raseiniai.

On 11 July 1941 Col P Poluboiarov, Northwestern Front armoured directorate reported that the 3rd Mechanised Corps had 'completely perished', having only 400 men remaining who escaped encirclement with 2nd Tank Division and only one BT-7 tank.

== Second Formation ==
The second formation of the division was originally formed on 14 May 1932 in village Lutkovka-medical in the Veditsky Shmakovsky raion of the Ussuriysk Oblast, Far Eastern Military District, as the 1st or 2nd (sources differ) Collective Farm Division. It was renamed the 66th Rifle Division on 21 May 1936.

The division formed part of the 35th Army of the Independent Coastal Group in the Far East in May 1945. In August 1945 the division, as a part of 1st Far East Front, participated in the Soviet operation against Japan. On 9 August 1945 the division began operations as part of 35th Army, advancing 12 kilometers, having forced the Songacha River in northern Heilongjiang. The division fought on the Ussuri River at Khotunsky (Хотунского), Mishansky (Мишаньского), Border (Пограничного), and Duninsky (Дунинского) fortified districts, capturing the cities of Mishan, Jilin, Jantszy, and Harbin. For its valour in combat and courage on 19 September 1945 the 66th Rifle Division was awarded the Order of Kutuzov, Second Degree. Three Hero of the Soviet Union medals, 1266 awards, and 2838 medals were given to the division's personnel.

On 29 November 1945, it was reorganised as the 2nd Tank Division. It was renamed again in 1957 as the 32nd Tank Division, and in 1965 as the 66th Tank Division. On 30 March 1970, the division became the 277th Motor Rifle Division.

== Bibliography ==
- Feskov, V.I.; Golikov, V.I.; Kalashnikov, K.A.; Slugin, S.A. (2013). Вооруженные силы СССР после Второй Мировой войны: от Красной Армии к Советской [The Armed Forces of the USSR after World War II: From the Red Army to the Soviet: Part 1 Land Forces] (in Russian). Tomsk: Scientific and Technical Literature Publishing. ISBN 9785895035306.
- Glantz, David (1998). Stumbling Colossus. University Press of Kansas.
- Michael Holm, 2nd Tank Division (Second Formation)
- Raus, Erhard (2003). Panzer Operations: The Eastern Front Memoir of General Raus, 1941–1945. Compiled and Translated by Steven H. Newton. Cambridge, Massachusetts: Da Capo Press. ISBN 0-306-81247-9.
- Zaloga, Steven J.; Kinnear, Jim; Sarson, Peter (1995). KV-1 & 2 Heavy Tanks 1939–45. Osprey Publishing. ISBN 1-85532-496-2.
