= Bundeshaus =

Bundeshaus or Federal House may refer to:

- Federal Palace of Switzerland
- Bundeshaus (Bonn), former provisional parliament house of the Federal Republic of Germany, in Bonn
- Bundeshaus (Berlin)
