= Ludwig Peter Kowalski =

German painter (1891–1967)

Ludwig Peter Kowalski (1 August 1891 - 5 July 1967) was a German painter. He was an artistic companion and close friend of the Expressionist Otto Mueller, exhibiting alongside him from 1926 in the 1922 Group. He produced portraits, still lives, landscapes and cityscapes. His watercolours are particularly noteworthy and are held in collections such as the 20th Century Gallery in Berlin.

From 1947 until his death he focussed on works in glass, designing the window in the Sitzungssaal of Berlin's Bundeshaus, the five round windows in Berlin's Kaiser-Friedrich-Gedächtniskirche, the ground-glass wall in the Schillertheater's foyer, windows in the Berlin churches of St. Rita, the Herz-Jesu-Kirche, the Luisenkirche, St. Elisabeth and St. Ansgar, windows in the Wilhelm-Weskamm-Haus in Berlin and the coloured glass wall in the Deutschen Heimat des Ostens.

== Life ==
Born in Königshütte, Upper Silesia, he studied at the Academy for Art and Crafts in Breslau under Hans Poelzig. During the First World War he served in the army. He studied in Italy, which had a strong influence on his personality and art. From 1927 Kowalski returned to the Academy as head of the nude-drawing room then of the painting department (also officially known as the Studienabteilung). He was a member of the Künstlerbund Schlesien, and from 1928 of the Deutschen Künstlerbund. He was dismissed from his post by the Nazi regime in 1934, losing his artworks when he fled Breslau in 1945. He lived in Berlin from 1949 until his death there, creating stained-glass windows and other large-format glass artworks.

== Bibliography (in German) ==
- Cornelius Müller Hofstede: Monumentale Glasgemälde von Ludwig Peter Kowalski in Schlesien, 1940.
- Hugo Hartung: Schlesien (Zeitschrift), Jahrgang 12, 1967.
- Agnes Kern: Ludwig Peter Kowalski. Über eine widersprüchliche Künstlerkarriere zwischen Avantgarde, "deutschem Kunstschaffen" und Nachkriegsmoderne. In: Dagmar Schmengler u. a. (ed.s): Maler. Mentor. Magier. Otto Mueller und sein Netzwerk in Breslau, Heidelberg u. a.: Kehrer 2018. ISBN 978-3-86828-873-5, S. 168–177.
