= Artillerie Prüfungskommission =

Military research branch of the Prussian Army

Coordinates: 52°29′53.06″N 13°19′52.33″E

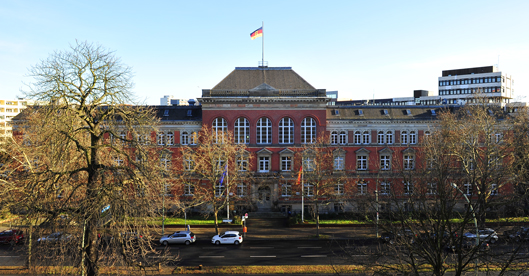
Former offices of the Artillerie Prüfungskommission

The Artillerie Prüfungskommission, (Artillery Test Commission) was founded in 1809 as part of the artillery of the Prussian Army. It was responsible for answering technical questions, testing the quality of new artillery materiel, and executing experiments. The Artillerie Prüfungskommission later became part of the Imperial German Army. Other nations had equivalent authorities, e.g. the Austro-Hungarian was called Artilleriekomitee. The former headquarters of the Artillerie Prüfungskommission on the Bundesallee in Berlin are still standing.

== History ==
In 1808, the Prussian Artillery was reorganized and put under the command of Prince August of Prussia. On 17 March 1809, King Frederick William III ordered the establishment of a special commission for Artillery affairs. Prince August became its first president. That same year, Johann Christian von Pontanus got in charge. The government also wanted Gerhard von Scharnhorst to become involved, but he declined because of having too much work. On 29 February 1816 the kommission was renamed Artillerie Prüfungskommission (APK).

The Artillerie Prüfungskommission (APK) consistited of senior Prussian officers. In 1871, it consisted of: The president; Those who were members on account of their office; The Feuerwerksmeister of the Artillery; The director of the Spandau gun foundry; The first teacher of the united artillery and engineering schools; and some special appointees.

The APK had to answer all artillery questions that were laid before it. It also had to test materiel and execute experiments regarding new developments. Therefore, a testing department was founded from the APK's staff. In 1869, the testing department got a special artillery company to conduct these tests.

After the German unification, the APK became part of the Imperial German Army. By 1881 there were also Bavarian, Saxon, and Württemberg artillery officers sent to the APK. In Saxony, there was still a separate Artillerie Kommission. The eponymous Bavarian Artillerie Prüfungs Kommission was disbanded in 1878.

In April 1883, the APK was split in two departments: Abteilung I (Feldartillerie) and Abteilung II (Fußartillerie). The department chiefs had the rank and pay of a regimental commander. The APK also had a depot authority, an artefact collection and an Ersatz-Bataillon.

In 1909, the APK celebrated its centenary.

After World War I, the APK was disbanded in late October 1919. It was replaced by the Inspektion für Waffen der Reichswehr. This was led by general Karl Becker. In the mid-1920s this led to the 'Inspektion für Waffen und Gerät' of the Heereswaffenamt(HWA).

== Significance ==
The Artillerie Prüfungskommission (APK) played a significant role in the development of the Prussian (Krupp) rifled breechloading field guns, which were so important during the 1870/1 Franco-Prussian War. The APK was also important in promoting the development of the German naval guns. In general, the private arms industry of Germany was also content with the APK.

== (Artillery) ranges ==
=== Jungfernheide/Tegel ===
As of 1824, the exercise grounds in Jungfernheide included an (artillery) range. In 1828 the Reinickendorfer Artillerie-Schießplatz was moved to this location. The range then became known as the Tegel Range (Schießplatz Tegel). The range was in use till about 1875. Berlin Tegel Airport is now in this location.

The Königliche Preußische Gewehrfabrique and Spandau gunpowder factories were near this location. The increased effective range of guns, security concerns, and the increased population density made the establishment of a new range at Kummersdorf necessary.

=== Jüterbog ===
In 1864 an artillery range was taken into use in Jüterbog. In 1886 the APK started large scale exercises against a mock fortress target made after Prussian and French examples.

=== Kummersdorf ===
In about 1875, the range at Kummersdorf was taken into use. After World War I, the Heeresversuchsanstalt Kummersdorf was built here. With the end of World War II, shooting at this range ended.

== Some notable presidents ==
- Heinrich von Diest 25 July 1832 - 8 November 1847
- Karl von Strotha 29 September 1850 - 17 February 1850
- Leopold von Puttkamer 10 July 1860 - 18 November 186
- Ludwig Sieger 4 April 1910 - 1 August 1914

== Notable members ==
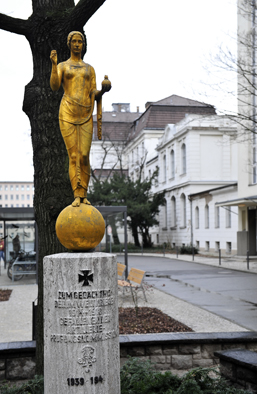
Otto Schulz: Monument for the fallen of the APK 1914–1918

In alphabetic order

- Max Bauer (1869–1929), Colonel and departmental chief of the Oberste Heeresleitung, Military author, Orden Pour le Mérite mit Eichenlaub, Member of the APK 1899–1902.
- Max Born (1882–1970), Physicist and Mathematician, Nobel Prize in Physics, participated in a commission that researched artillery sound ranging.
- Prince Kraft of Hohenlohe-Ingelfingen (1827–1892), Prussian general of Artillery, military author, member of the APK as of 1868
- Walter Jellinek (1885–1955), served at the APK as of 1917.
- Leo Löwenstein (1879–1956), German physicist and chemist, army captain, Considered to have been the inventor of Artillery sound ranging. In 1913 he presented a method to locate sound-producing artefacts to the APK. This was called: 'Auffindung des Ortes von schallerzeugenden Gegenständen'. The APK then executed tests to perfect the method at the Kummersdorf range.
- Johann Emanuel Ludwig (1758–1823), Prussian Lt-Colonel member of the APK since 1810.
- Ludger Mintrop (1880–1956), worked on artillery sound ranging at the APK.
- Joseph von Radowitz (1797–1853), Prussian general and statesman, 1814 first teacher of mathematics and the science of war at the Cadet Corps at Kassel. In 1823 military teacher of the Prussian Prince Albrecht. In 1828 member of the obersten Militärstudienbehörde, teacher at the Kriegsschule and member of the APK. Since 1830 Chied of the general staff of the artillery.
- Julius Schuster, is seen as the first commissioned (hauptamtlich) paid German science historian. Scientific employe in 1915.
- Wilhelm Schwinning (1874–1955), German metallurgist. Member since 1909
- Daniel Friedrich Gottlob Teichert (1796–1853), Major in the artillery, representative in the Frankfurter Nationalversammlung 1848/49, later Lt-colonel in the Prussian Ministry of War.
- Richard Wille (1841–1911), Major-General, military author. In 1865 with the Ministry of War and the APK. Director of the artillery factory in Spandau and president (vorsteher) of the artillery design office in Spandau.

== Offices ==
Between 1893 and 1895 the military construction office Berlin VII headed by the Geheimen Oberbaurates Bernhardt and the architect Josef Wieczorek built a new office for the APK on what was then named Kaiserallee, and is now named Bundesallee. The APK used the building until 1918.

The officers Erich Hoepner and Henning von Tresckow, who participated in the 1944 20 July plot, worked in the former APK office. There is a monument to them in the courtyard of the building.

After World War II, the damaged building was renovated. On 17 April 1950 it was reopened as the Bundeshaus. Until 1990 this housed the plenipotentiary of the German federal government as well as the representatives of several German ministries.

== Gallery ==
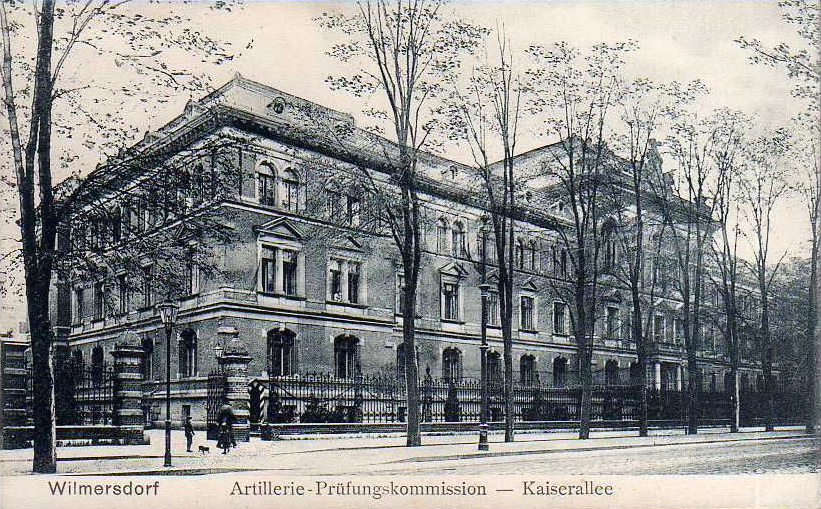
APK office in about 1909

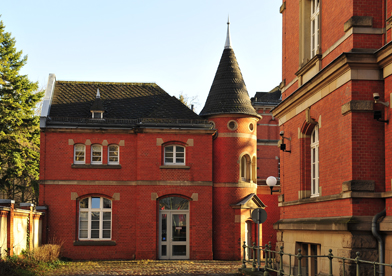
Inner court of the offices

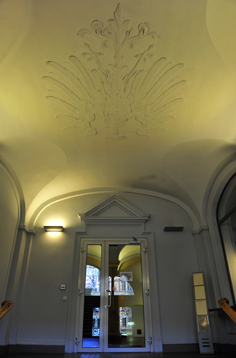
Entrance with imperial eagle

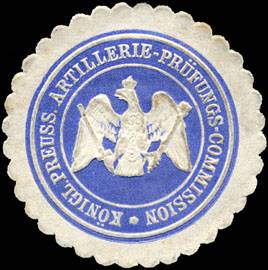
Sealing mark
