= Battle of Raseiniai =

Battle on the Eastern Front of World War II

Coordinates: 55°21′N 23°17′E

- Part of the Eastern Front of World War II
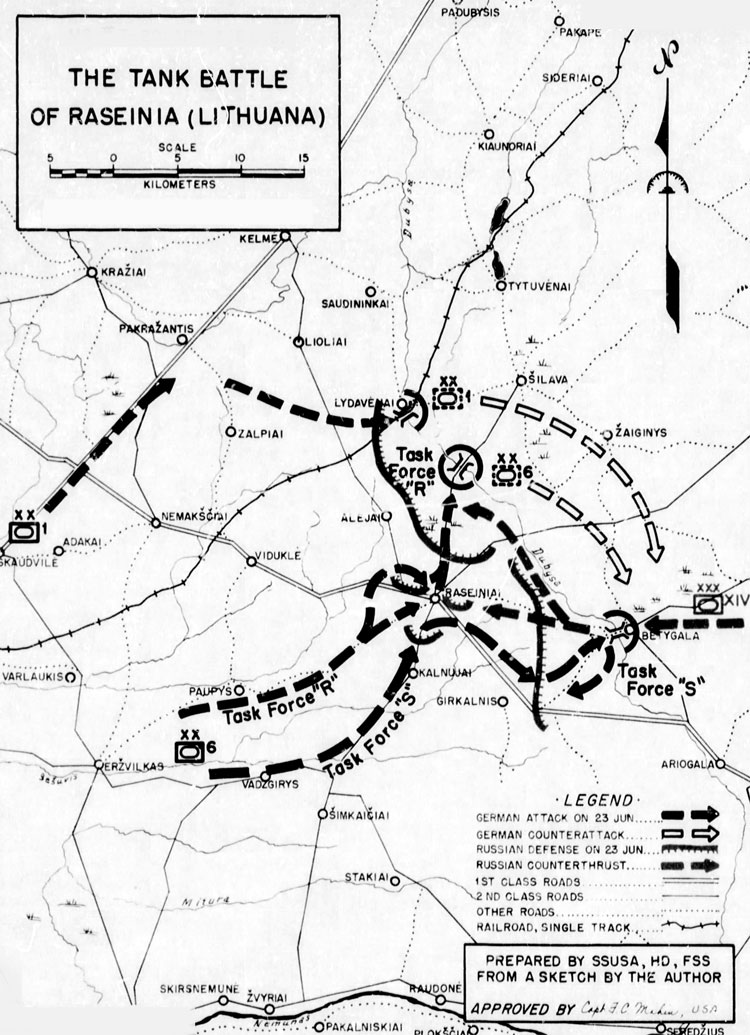
- Map of the battle
Date	23–27 June 1941
Location	Raseiniai, Lithuania
Result	German victory

Belligerents
Germany	Soviet Union

Commanders and leaders
(Nazi Germany) Erich Hoepner	(Soviet Union) Fyodor Kuznetsov; (Soviet Union) Alexey Kurkin; (Soviet Union) Yegor Solyankin †

Strength
235–245 tanks^{[f]}	749 tanks

Casualties and losses
2/3 of the (6th Panzer Division and 4th Panzer Group), a few cannons and trucks	704 tanks (crewmen either killed or captured)

The Battle of Raseiniai (23–27 June 1941) was a large tank battle that took place in the early stages of Operation Barbarossa, the German invasion of the Soviet Union. The battle was fought between the elements of the German 4th Panzer Group and the Soviet 3rd Mechanized Corps with the 12th Mechanised Corps, in Lithuania, 75 km (47 mi) north-west of Kaunas. The Red Army tried to contain and destroy the German troops that had crossed the Neman River but was unable to prevent them from advancing.

The result of the battle was the destruction of most of the Soviet armoured forces of the Northwestern Front, which cleared the way for the Germans to attack towards the crossings of the Daugava River (Western Dvina). The fighting around Raseiniai was one of the main battles of the initial phase of Operation Barbarossa, referred to in Soviet historiography as the Border Defensive Battles (22–27 June 1941) and formed part of the larger Soviet Baltic Strategic Defensive Operation.

== Prelude ==
Army Group North, commanded by Field Marshal Wilhelm Ritter von Leeb, and staging in East Prussia prior to the commencement of the offensive, was the northern of three army groups participating in Operation Barbarossa, the German invasion of the Soviet Union. Army Group North controlled the 18th Army and the 16th Army, along with the 4th Panzer Group (General Erich Hoepner). The Germans had 20 infantry divisions, three Panzer and three motorized infantry divisions. Air support was provided by Luftflotte 1 (1st Air Fleet).

The Soviet military administrative control over the Baltic republics area where the Army Group North would be deployed was exercised by the Special Baltic Military District which after the invasion was renamed into the Northwestern Front (Colonel General Fyodor Kuznetsov). The front had the 8th and 11th Armies with the 27th Armies in its second echelon; the Northwestern Front had 28 rifle, 4 tank and 2 motorized divisions.

On 22 June 1941, the Northwestern Front had two mechanised corps, the 3rd Mechanised Corps (Major General Alexey Kurkin) had 31,975 men and 669^{[a]} – 672 tanks^{[b]} and the 12th Mechanized Corps (Major General Nikolai Shestapolov) had 28,832 men and 730^{[c]} – 749 tanks;^{[d]} only BT-7s and T-26 tanks were available.^{[e]}

== Battle ==
=== Initial assault ===
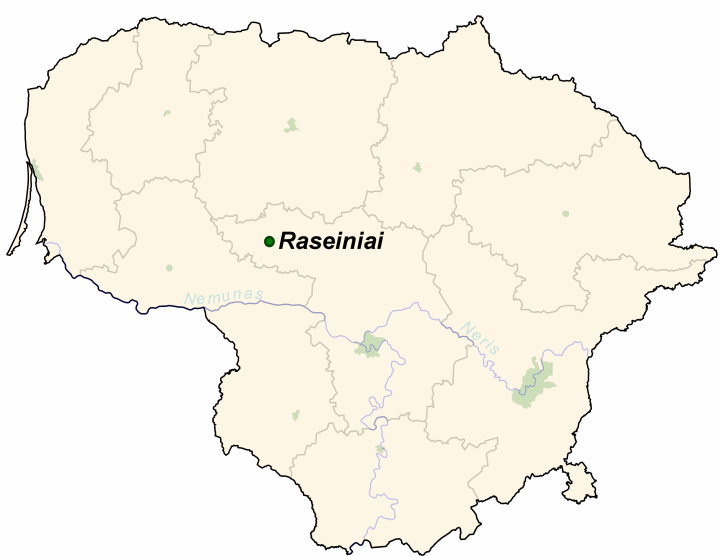
Location map of Lithuania showing Raseiniai

The 4th Panzer Group advanced in two spearheads, led by the XLI Panzer Corps (General Georg-Hans Reinhardt) and LVI Panzer Corps (General Erich von Manstein). Their objective was to cross the Neman and Daugava, the most difficult natural obstacles in front of the Army Group North and to drive towards Leningrad. German bombers destroyed many of the signals and communications centers, naval bases and the Soviet airfields from Riga to Kronstadt. Šiauliai, Vilnius and Kaunas were also bombed. Soviet aircraft had been on one-hour alert but were held on their airfields after the first wave of German bombers passed.

At 9:30 AM on 22 June, Kuznetsov ordered the 3rd and 12th Mechanized corps to take up their counter-attack positions, intending to use them in flanking attacks on the 4th Panzer Group, which had broken through to the river Dubysa (Dubissa). By noon, the Soviet divisions began to fall back and the German columns then began to swing towards Raseiniai, where Kuznetsov was concentrating his armor for a big counter-attack on the next day. By the evening, Soviet formations had fallen back to the Dubysa. North-west of Kaunas, forward elements of LVI Panzer Corps reached the Dubysa and seized the vital Ariogala road viaduct across it.

By the end of 22 June, the German armoured spearheads over the Neman had penetrated 80 km (50 mi). The next day, Kuznetsov committed his armoured forces to battle. Near Raseiniai, the XLI Panzer Corps was counter-attacked by the Soviet 3rd and 12th Mechanised Corps. The concentration of Soviet armour was detected by the Luftwaffe, which immediately attacked tank columns of the 12th Mechanised Corps south-west of Šiauliai. No Soviet fighters appeared and the Soviet 23rd Tank Division sustained particularly severe losses, Ju 88s from Luftflotte 1 attacking at low level, setting 40 vehicles, including tanks and lorries on fire.

German forces encountered a unit equipped with the Soviet KV heavy tanks for the first time. On 23 June, Kampfgruppe von Seckendorff of the 6th Panzer Division, consisting of 114th Panzergrenadier Regiment (motorized infantry), Aufklärungsabteilung 57 (Panzer Reconnaissance Battalion 57), one company of Panzerjäger Battalion 41 and Motorcycle Battalion 6 was overrun by the 2nd Tank Division (General Yegor Solyankin) from the 3rd Mechanised Corps near Skaudvilė.^{[f]} The German Panzer 35(t) tanks and anti-tank weapons were ineffective against the Soviet heavy tanks, some of which were out of ammunition but closed in and destroyed German antitank guns by driving over them.^{[g]}

The Germans fired at the tracks of the KVs, bombarded them with artillery, anti-aircraft guns or sticky bombs.

=== The lone Soviet tank ===
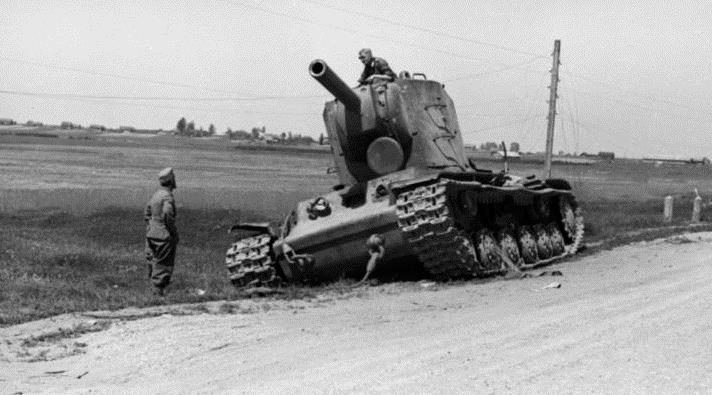
An abandoned Soviet KV-2 tank left by the roadside inspected by curious German soldiers. One KV-2, in some accounts, held up the entire 6th Panzer Division for a single day before being finally overwhelmed.

A single KV-1 or KV-2 tank (accounts vary) advanced far behind the German lines after attacking a column of German supply trucks. The tank stopped on a road across soft ground and was engaged by four 50 mm anti-tank guns of the 6th Panzer Division's anti-tank battalion. The tank was hit several times but fired back and destroyed all four enemy AT guns. An 8.8 cm FlaK of the divisional anti-aircraft battalion was moved about 730 m (800 yd) behind the lone Soviet tank but was knocked out by the tank before it could manage to score a hit. During the night, German combat engineers tried to destroy the tank with satchel charges but failed despite possibly damaging the vehicle's tracks. Early on the morning of 25 June, German tanks fired on the KV from the nearby woodland while another 8.8 cm FlaK fired at the tank from its rear. Of several shots fired, only two managed to penetrate the tank. German infantry then advanced towards the KV tank and it responded with machine-gun fire against them. Eventually, the tank was knocked out by grenades thrown into the hatches. According to some accounts, the dead crew was recovered and buried by the approaching German soldiers with full military honors, while in other accounts, the crew escaped from their crippled tank during the night.

The 6th Panzer Division Kampfgruppe commander, General Erhard Raus, described it as a KV-1, which was damaged by several shots from an 8.8 cm FlaK being used in an anti-tank role fired from behind the vehicle, while it was distracted by light Panzer 35(t) tanks from Panzer Battalion 65.^{[h]} The KV-1 crew were killed by a pioneer engineer unit who pushed grenades through two holes made by the AT gun while the turret began moving again, with the other five or six shots having not fully penetrated. Apparently, the KV-1 crew had only been stunned by the shots which had entered the turret and were buried nearby with military honors by the German unit.

In 1965, the remains of the crew were exhumed and reburied at the Soviet military cemetery in Raseiniai. According to research by Russian military historian Maksim Kolomiets, the tank may have been from the 3rd Company of the 1st Battalion of the 4th Tank Regiment, itself a part of the 2nd Tank Division. It is impossible to identify the crew because their personal documents were lost after being buried in the woods north of Raseiniai during the retreat, possibly by German troops.

=== Conclusion of the battle ===
In the south, by 23 June, Lieutenant-General Vasily Ivanovich Morozov, the 11th Army commander, ordered the units falling back to the old fortress town of Kaunas on the Nemunas river (Neman in Russian) to move on to Jonava some 48 km (30 mi) to the north-east. By the evening of 25 June, the Soviet 8th Army was falling back towards Riga and the 11th Army towards Vilnius and the Desna, a gap opening in the Soviet front from Ukmergė to Daugavpils. By 26 June, the 1st Panzer Division and 36th Motorised Infantry Division of the XLI Panzer Corps and following infantry divisions had cut through the rear of the Soviet mechanised corps and linked up. The Soviet 3rd Mechanised Corps had run out of fuel and the 2nd Tank Division was encircled and almost destroyed. In the encirclement, Solyankin was killed in action. The 5th Tank Division and 84th Motorised Division were severely depleted due to losses in vehicles and personnel.^{[i]} The 12th Mechanized Corps pulled out of the trap but was very short of fuel and ammunition.^{[j]} The Soviet Baltic Fleet was withdrawn from bases in Liepāja, Ventspils and Riga by 26 June and LVI Panzer Corps dashed for the River Daugava and in a remarkable coup seized bridges near Daugava intact.

== Aftermath ==
The battle is known in Soviet historiography as the Border Defensive Battles (22–27 June 1941), forming part of the larger Soviet Baltic Strategic Defensive Operation. After the battle, the leading formations of LVI Panzer Corps began to enlarge the bridgehead after the seizure of the Dvina bridges and the fall of Dvinsk. On 25 June, Marshal Semyon Timoshenko ordered Kuznetsov to organize a defense of the Western Dvina, by deploying the 8th Army on the right bank from Riga to Livani while the 11th Army defended the Livani–Kraslava sector. Kuznetsov also used the 27th Army (Major-General Nikolai Berzarin), moving troops from Hiiumaa and Saaremaa islands and Riga to Daugavpils. At the same time the Soviet (Stavka) released the 21st Mechanised Corps (Major-General Dmitry Lelyushenko) with 98 tanks and 129 guns, from the Moscow Military District to co-operate with the 27th Army.

At 5:00 a.m., on 28 June, Lelyushenko attempted to destroy the German bridgehead near Daugavpils. Manstein halted on the Dvina but attacked the next day, striking along the Daugavpils–Ostrov highway. At Riga on the afternoon of 29 June, the Germans crossed the railway bridge over the Dvina. On 30 June, Soviet troops withdrew from the right bank of the river and by 1 July were retreating towards Estonia. Instead of rushing Leningrad, the panzer divisions were ordered to wait for infantry reinforcements, which took almost a week.

Kuznetsov was sacked by Timoshenko and Major-General Pyotr Sobennikov, the 8th Army commander, took over the front on 4 July. On 29 June, Timoshenko ordered that if the Northwestern Front had to withdraw from the Daugava, the line of the Velikaya, was to be held and every effort made to get Soviet troops dug in there. The line at Velikaya fell rapidly on 8 July, with rail and road bridges remaining intact and Pskov fell on the evening of 9 July. The 11th Army was ordered to move to Dno but the collapse of the Northwestern Front on the Velikaya and the German sweep to Luga were serious defeats, forcing the 8th Army towards the Gulf of Finland. The German pause had given time for more troops to be rushed to the Siege of Leningrad, a long and hard battle.
