= Gustav Schmidt (general) =

WW2 German Army general (1894-1943)

- Born: Gustav Richard Ernst Schmidt; 24 April 1894; Carsdorf, Kreis Querfurt, Regierungsbezirk Merseburg, Province of Saxony, Kingdom of Prussia, German Empire
- Died: 7 August 1943 (aged 49); Between Beresowka and Belgorod near Kursk, Soviet Union
- Relatives: ∞ 1919 Maria Mayer; 1 son Johannes Mayer (brother in law)
- Military career
- Allegiance: Kingdom of Prussia; German Empire; Weimar Republic; Nazi Germany
- Branch: Prussian Army; Imperial German Army; Freikorps (Grenzschutz Ost); Reichsheer; German Army
- Service years: 1913–1943
- Rank: Generalleutnant
- Commands: 74th Infantry Regiment; 19th Rifle Brigade; 19th Panzer Division
- Conflicts: World War I World War II: Invasion of Poland; Battle of Belgium; Battle of France; Operation Barbarossa; Battle of Białystok–Minsk; Battle of Smolensk (1941); Battle of Moscow; Battles of Rzhev; Battle of Kursk; Belgorod-Khar'kov Offensive Operation (KIA)
- Awards: Knight's Cross of the Iron Cross with Oak Leaves

Gustav Richard Ernst Schmidt (24 April 1894 – 7 August 1943) was a German career officer, finally general in the Wehrmacht during World War II. He was a recipient of the Knight's Cross of the Iron Cross with Oak Leaves.

== Death ==
Most post-war sources state, Schmidt committed suicide on 7 August 1943 to avoid capture by the Red Army in the course of the Soviet Belgorod-Kharkov Offensive Operation (it cannot be clearly determined whether this occurred before or after capture). According to the war diary of the 19th Panzer Division, however, he was killed in action during the breakthrough from the Soviet encirclement.

== Promotions ==
- 10 February 1913 Fahnenjunker (Officer Candidate)
  - joined the Infanterie-Regiment "Graf Tauentzien von Wittenberg" (3. Brandenburgisches) Nr. 20
- 1 July 1913 Fahnenjunker-Unteroffizier (Officer Candidate with Corporal/NCO/Junior Sergeant rank)
- 18 October 1913 Fähnrich (Officer Cadet)
- 19 June 1914 Leutnant (2nd Lieutenant) with Patent from 23 June 1912
- 16 September 1917 Oberleutnant (1st Lieutenant)
- 1 July 1925 Hauptmann (Captain)
- 1 May 1934 Major (29)
- 2 October 1936 Oberstleutnant (Lieutenant Colonel) with effect and Rank Seniority (RDA) from 1 October 1936 (26)
- 31 May 1939 Oberst (Colonel) with effect and RDA from 1 June 1939 (23)
- 12 April 1942 Generalmajor (Major General) with effect and RDA from 1 April 1942 (75b)
- 21 January 1943 Generalleutnant (Lieutenant General) with effect and RDA from 1 January 1943 (59)

== Awards and decorations ==
- Iron Cross (1914), 2nd and 1st Class
  - 2nd Class on 15 September 1914
  - 1st Class on 18 October 1915
- Royal House Order of Hohenzollern, Knight's Cross with Swords (HOH3X) on 14 May 1917
- Wound Badge (1918) in Black on 14 May 1918
- Honour Cross of the World War 1914/1918 with Swords on 22 December 1934
- Wehrmacht Long Service Award, 4th to 1st Class
  - 2nd Class on 2 October 1936
  - 1st Class on 10 February 1938
- Repetition Clasp 1939 to the Iron Cross 1914, 2nd and 1st Class
  - 2nd Class on 21 September 1939
  - 1st Class on 2 October 1939
- Panzer Badge in Silver
- Winter Battle in the East 1941–42 Medal on 1 August 1942
- German Cross in Gold on 26 April 1942 as Oberst and Commander of the 19th Rifle Brigade
- Knight's Cross of the Iron Cross with Oak Leaves
  - Knight's Cross on 4 September 1940 as Oberst and Commander of the Infanterie-Regiment 74
  - 203rd Oak Leaves on 6 March 1943 as Generalleutnant and Commander of the 19. Panzer-Division

Military offices
Preceded by General der Panzertruppe Otto von Knobelsdorff	Commander of 19. Panzer-Division; 5 January 1942 – 7 August 1943	Succeeded by Generalleutnant Hans Källner
