= 1922 Group =

The 1922 Group (German - Gruppe 1922) was an art group within the Silesian Artists' Association. It was founded in 1922 and lasted until 1932.

Its members included students and tutors at the Breslauer Akademie für Kunst und Kunstgewerbe: Isidor Aschheim, Willy Braun, Paul Dobers, Paul Feg(e)ler, Paula Grünfeld, Julius Haberfeld, Karl Hanusch, Ludwig Peter Kowalski, Paquita Kowalski-Tannert (born 1890), Thomas Myrtek, Georg Nerlich, Max Odoy, Konrad Scheu, and Hans Zimbal.

The artists "did not set up a rigid program by which they wanted to work and be judged. But they consciously combined inner experience with naturalism. Only occasionally does an expressionist gesture intervene. Such a gesture never becomes dominant. And that is precisely why the Breslauers remained quietly recognized and survived in the following period. Their teachers belonged to the "Brücke" or were close to it. Their confidant was Professor Hanusch, who was teaching in Breslau at the time. Their confident drawing, their fine way of recognizing and capturing the beautiful in the inconspicuous or in the waves of the loud and occasionally intrusive, can still be seen in the group's works today."

== Exhibitions ==
- 1922, (with the Künstlerbund Schlesien) (catalogue, edition of 50 copies)
- 1925, Das moderne Aquarell (The Modern Watercolour), together with works by Otto Mueller, Konrad von Kardorff, Oskar Moll and Johannes Molzahn
- 1929, with the Künstlerbund Schlesien
- 1932, in the Künstlerhalle on the Christopheriplatz (catalogue, poster)

== Bibliography (in German) ==
- Petra Hölscher: Die Akademie für Kunst und Kunstgewerbe zu Breslau. Wege einer Kunstschule 1791–1932. (= Bau + Kunst, Schleswig-Holsteinische Schriften zur Kunstgeschichte, Band 5.) Ludwig, Kiel 2003, ISBN 3-933598-50-8.
- Gruppe 1922. (Katalog der Ausstellung in Breslau, April bis Mai 1932) Breslau 1932. (mit Arbeiten von Aschheim, Braun, Dobers, Grünfeld, Haberfeld, Hanusch, Kowalski, Myrtek, Nerlich)
