= Walter Denkert =

German general (1897–1982)

- Born: 23 February 1897; Kiel, German Empire
- Died: 9 July 1982 (aged 85); Kiel, West Germany
- Military career
- Allegiance: Nazi Germany
- Branch: Army
- Rank: Generalleutnant
- Commands: 6th Panzer Division; 19th Panzer Division; 3rd Infantry Division
- Conflicts: World War II
- Awards: Knight's Cross of the Iron Cross

Walter Denkert (23 February 1897 – 9 July 1982) was a German general during World War II. He was a recipient of the Knight's Cross of the Iron Cross of Nazi Germany.

== Awards and decorations ==
- German Cross in Gold (8 March 1945)
- Knight's Cross of the Iron Cross on 14 May 1944 as Oberst and commander of 19. Panzer-Division

Military offices
| Preceded by Generalleutnant Rudolf Freiherr von Waldenfels | Commander of 6. Panzer-Division; 13 March 1944 – 28 March 1944 | Succeeded by Generalleutnant Rudolf Freiherr von Waldenfels |
| Preceded by Generalleutnant Hans Källner | Commander of 19. Panzer-Division; 28 March 1944 – May 1944 | Succeeded by Generalleutnant Hans Källner |
| Preceded by Generalleutnant Hans-Günther von Rost | Commander of 3. Panzergrenadier-Division; 25 June 1944 – April 1945 | Succeeded by None |
