= Rudolf Freiherr von Waldenfels =

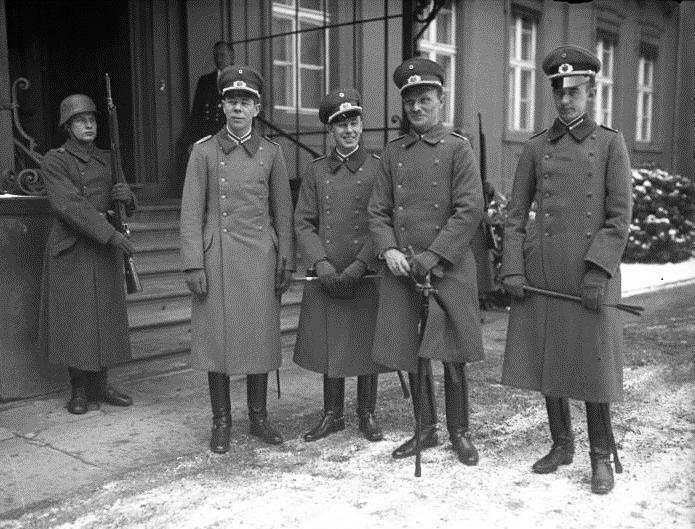
- Waldenfels (2nd from right)
- Born: 23 September 1895
- Died: 14 August 1969 (aged 73)
- Military career
- Allegiance: Nazi Germany
- Branch: Army (Wehrmacht)
- Service years: 1914–1945
- Rank: Generalleutnant
- Commands: 6th Panzer Division
- Conflicts: World War II
- Awards: Knight's Cross of the Iron Cross with Oak Leaves

Rudolf Freiherr von Waldenfels (4 December 1895 – 14 August 1969) was a German general during World War II who commanded the 6th Panzer Division. He was a recipient of the Knight's Cross of the Iron Cross with Oak Leaves of Nazi Germany.

== Awards and decorations ==
- Iron Cross (1914) 2nd Class (16 October 1915) & 1st Class (27 April 1924)
- Clasp to the Iron Cross (1939) 2nd Class (24 September 1939) & 1st Class (12 October 1939)
- Knight's Cross of the Iron Cross with Oak Leaves
  - Knight's Cross on 11 October 1941 as Oberstleutnant.
  - Oak Leaves on 14 May 1944 as Generalmajor and commander of the 6. Panzer-Division

Military offices
Preceded by Generalmajor Wilhelm Crisolli	Commander of 6. Panzer-Division; 21 August 1943 – 8 February 1944	Succeeded by Generalleutnant Werner Marcks
Preceded by Generalleutnant Werner Marcks	Commander of 6. Panzer-Division; 21 February – 13 March 1944	Succeeded by Generalleutnant Walter Denkert
Preceded by Generalleutnant Walter Denkert	Commander of 6. Panzer-Division; 28 March 1944 – 23 November 1944	Succeeded by Oberst Friedrich-Wilhelm Jürgens
Preceded by Oberst Friedrich-Wilhelm Jürgens	Commander of 6. Panzer-Division; 20 January 1945 – 8 May 1945	Succeeded by Unit Surrendered
