= 19th Panzer Division =

German army division during World War II

- 19. Panzer-Division
- Unit insignia
- Active: 1 November 1940 – 8 May 1945
- Country: Germany
- Branch: Army
- Type: Panzer
- Role: Armoured warfare
- Size: Division
- Garrison/HQ: Wehrkreis XI: Hanover
- Engagements: Operation Barbarossa; Battle of Moscow; Battle of Kursk; Kamenets–Podolsky pocket; Warsaw Uprising; Vistula–Oder Offensive; Prague Offensive

The 19th Panzer Division (English: 19th Tank Division) was an armoured division in the German Army, the Wehrmacht, during World War II. It was created from the 19th Infantry Division.

The division fought exclusively on the Eastern Front, except for a brief period of refitting in the Netherlands in mid-1944. It took part in the battles of Moscow and Kursk as well as in the crushing of the Polish uprising at Warsaw. It eventually surrendered to Soviet forces in Czechoslovakia in May 1945.

== History ==
The division was formed in November 1940 from the 19th Infantry Division, gaining the 27th Tank Regiment and in turn giving up the 59th Infantry Regiment to the new 20th Panzer Division. The new division was part of Operation Barbarossa which began in June 1941, suffering such heavy casualties in the first two months that one of its three tank battalions had to be disbanded by August. Among other operations, it fought around Velikiye Luki against the Soviet 29th Territorial Rifle Corps. The division took part in the advance in the central sector of the Eastern Front and participated in the Battle of Moscow.

Further losses during the defensive operations in the winter of 1941–42 forced the division to disbanded another tank battalion, reducing it to just one. The 19th Panzer Division remained in the central sector until late 1942, when it was sent south to support the Italian 8th Army. The division took part in defensive battles after the collapse of the German southern front following the encirclement of the 6th Army at Stalingrad. It participated in the unsuccessful German offensive during the Battle of Kursk, suffering heavy casualties while operating in the area of Belgorod. In October 1943 it was reinforced with an additional tank battalion.

The division was part of the German defensive operations and retreat through Ukraine in late 1943 and early 1944. It was part of the successful escape of the 1st Panzer Army from the Kamenets-Podolsky pocket in April 1944. The 19th Panzer Division, almost destroyed in the previous defensive battles, was sent to the Netherlands in May 1944 to be refitted. In the aftermath of Operation Bagration, the Soviet offensive that destroyed the center of the German Eastern Front, the division was sent by rail from the Netherlands back to the Eastern Front. It took part in the defence of Warsaw and the crushing of the Polish uprising.

On 1 January 1945, the division (then under 9th Army of Army Group A) had a strength of 14,888 men. This made it, in terms of manpower, the largest division in both its army and its entire army group.

After the Soviet Vistula–Oder Offensive in January 1945, the division was pushed south-west by the Soviet advance, first towards Breslau and then into Czechoslovakia. It eventually surrendered to Soviet forces in May 1945 west of Prague.

== Organization ==
Organization of the division:

- Headquarters
- 27th Panzer Regiment
- 73rd Panzergrenadier Regiment
- 74th Panzergrenadier Regiment
- 19th Panzer Artillery Regiment
- 19th Motorcycle Battalion (later 19th Panzer Reconnaissance Battalion)
- 19th Tank Destroyer Battalion
- 19th Panzer Engineer Battalion
- 19th Panzer Signal Battalion
- 272nd Army Anti-Aircraft Battalion (later added 29 April 1943)

== Division commanders ==
The commanders of the division:

- 1 November 1940 — General der Panzertruppe Otto von Knobelsdorff
- 5 January 1942 — Generalleutnant Gustav Schmidt (committed suicide to avoid capture, Beresowka, 7 August 1943)
- 7 August 1943 — Generalleutnant Hans Källner
- 28 March 1944 — Generalleutnant Walter Denkert
- May 1944 — Generalleutnant Hans Källner (killed in battle 18 April 1945 )
- 22 March 1945 — Generalmajor Hans-Joachim Deckert
