= Hans Källner =

German general (1898–1945)

- Born: 9 October 1898; Kattowitz, Province of Silesia, Kingdom of Prussia, German Empire
- Died: † 18 April 1945 (aged 46) near Olmütz, Protectorate of Bohemia and Moravia, German Reich
- Relatives: ∞ 24 July 1926 Luise "Lisa" Elisabeth Schmidt; 1 son
- Military career
- Allegiance: German Empire; Weimar Republic; Nazi Germany
- Branch: Imperial German Army; Freikorps; Reichswehr; Police; Heer
- Service years: 1915–1945
- Rank: Generalleutnant
- Commands: Schützen-Regiment 73; 19. Panzer-Division; XXIV. Panzerkorps
- Conflicts: World War I World War II
- Awards: Knight's Cross of the Iron Cross with Oak Leaves and Swords

Hans Gottfried Alfons Källner (9 October 1898 – 18 April 1945) was a German general during World War II and a recipient of the Knight's Cross of the Iron Cross with Oak Leaves and Swords. Källner was killed in action while visiting the front lines near Olomouc.

== Promotions ==
- 6 June 1915 Kriegsfreiwilliger (War Volunteer)
- 28 April 1916 Gefreiter (Private E-2/Lance Corporal)
- April 1917 Unteroffizier (NCO/Corporal/Junior Sergeant)
- September 1917 Vizewachtmeister (Vice Sergeant/Vice Staff Sergeant/Junior Sergeant-Major)
- 16 October 1917 Leutnant der Reserve (2nd Lieutenant of the Reserves)

=== Police ===
- 21 October 1920 Polizei-Leutnant (2nd Lieutenant of the Police)
- 24 May 1924 Polizei-Oberleutnant (1st Lieutenant of the Police) with effect from 1 May 1924
- 1 November 1929 Polizei-Hauptmann (Captain of the Police)

=== Wehrmacht ===
- 1 August 1935 Rittmeister with Rank Seniority (RDA) from 1 October 1932 (112)
- 2 August 1936 Major with effect and RDA from 1 August 1936 (12)
- 31 October 1939 Oberstleutnant (Lieutenant Colonel) with effect and RDA from 1 November 1939 (9)
- 15 February 1942 Oberst (Colonel) with effect and RDA from 1 March 1942 (80)
- 8 November 1943 Generalmajor (Major General) with effect and RDA from 1 November 1943 (8)
- 20 July 1944 Generalleutnant (Lieutenant General) with effect and RDA from 1 June 1944 (8)

== Awards and decorations ==
- Iron Cross (1914), 2nd and 1st Class
  - 2nd Class on 3 September 1917
  - 1st Class on 4 August 1918
- Silesian Eagle, 2nd and 1st Class on 9 September 1919
- Honour Cross of the World War 1914/1918 with Swords on 20 December 1934
- Wehrmacht Long Service Award, 4th to 2nd Class on 2 October 1936
- Repetition Clasp 1939 to the Iron Cross 1914, 2nd and 1st Class
  - 2nd Class on 19 September 1939
  - 1st Class on 18 October 1939
- Certificate of Recognition of the Commander-in-Chief of the Army (83rd award) on 12 July 1941
- General Assault Badge, I. Grade on 31 July 1941
- Mentioned in the Wehrmachtbericht (Armed Forces Report) of 18 October 1941
- Wound Badge (1939) in Silver on 8 November 1941
- Winter Battle in the East 1941–42 Medal on 5 August 1942
- German Cross in Gold on 18 October 1941 as Oberstleutnant and Commander of the Aufklärungs-Abteilung 11
- Knight's Cross of the Iron Cross with Oak Leaves and Swords
  - Knight's Cross on 3 May 1942 as Oberst and Commander of the Schützen-Regiment 73
  - 392nd Oak Leaves on 14 February 1944 as Generalmajor and Commander of the 19. Panzer-Division
  - 106th Swords on 23 October 1944 as Generalleutnant and Commander of the 19. Panzer-Division

== Sources ==
- German Federal Archives: BArch PERS 6/657 and PERS 6/299956

Military offices
Preceded by Generalleutnant Gustav Schmidt	Commander of 19. Panzer-Division; 7 August 1943 – 28 March 1944	Succeeded by Generalleutnant Walter Denkert
Preceded by Generalleutnant Walter Denkert	Commander of 19. Panzer-Division; May 1944 – 18 April 1945	Succeeded by Generalmajor Hans-Joachim Deckert
Preceded by General der Panzertruppe Walther Nehring	Commander of XXIV. Panzerkorps; 19 March 1945 – 18 April 1945	Succeeded by General der Artillerie Walter Hartmann
