= 6th Panzer Division =

German army division during World War II

- 6. Panzer-Division; — 6. PzDiv —
- Unit insignia 1939
- Active: October 1939 – May 1945
- Country: Nazi Germany
- Branch: German Army
- Type: Panzer
- Role: Armoured warfare
- Size: Division
- Part of: Wehrmacht
- Garrison/HQ: Wehrkreis VI: Wuppertal
- Engagements: World War II; Invasion of Poland; Battle of Belgium; Battle of France; Operation Barbarossa; Battle of Kursk; Battle of Korsun–Cherkassy; Kamenets–Podolsky pocket

Commanders
- Notable commanders: Erich Hoepner

Insignia
- Insignia (1939)

- Insignia (1941)

- Insignia (Kursk)

The 6th Panzer Division (English: 6th Tank Division) was an armoured division in the German Army, the Heer, during World War II, established in October 1939.

The division, initially formed as a light brigade, participated in the invasions of Poland, Belgium, France and the Soviet Union. From 1941 to 1945 it fought on the Eastern Front, interrupted only by periods of refitting spent in France and Germany. It eventually surrendered to US forces in Czechoslovakia in May 1945 but was handed over to Soviet authorities, where the majority of its remaining men would be imprisoned in Gulag hard labour camps.

== History ==
The 1st Light Brigade was a mechanized unit established in October 1937 in imitation of the French Division Légère Mécanique. It was intended to take on the roles of army-level reconnaissance and security that had traditionally been the responsibility of cavalry. It included mechanized reconnaissance units, motorized infantry, and a battalion of tanks. The concept of the Light Brigade, of which three were planned by the Wehrmacht, quickly showed its flawed nature and was abandoned.

In April 1938 the brigade was enlarged to become the 1st Light Division, receiving the 11th tank regiment as an attachment for its participation in the occupation of the Sudetenland in October 1938 and the subsequent disestablishment of Czechoslovakia in March 1939. Following the latter the division received 130 Czech-built tanks which were superior to the Panzer I and Panzer II the division had been equipped with. In 1939, the division fought in the Invasion of Poland.

Due to shortcomings that the campaign revealed in the organization of the Light divisions, it was reorganized as the 6th Panzer Division in October 1939, as were the other three light divisions which became the 7th, 8th and 9th Panzer Divisions.

As the 6th Panzer Division, it participated in the 1940 Battle of France. The division contained a single panzer regiment, the Panzer-Regiment 11, which in turn contained three Abteilungen, or battalions. The 11th Regiment was equipped with 75 Czech-built Panzer 35(t) tanks, which proved efficient but difficult to maintain because the maintenance manuals were in Czech rather than German, and spare parts were less readily supplied and harder to easily requisition as a result. Furthermore, there were six Befehlspanzer 35(t), which were a subtype of the 35(t) designed for military commanders, as well as 45 Panzer II and 27 Panzer IV.

The division was part of the German advance to the English Channel through Belgium. It then swung back towards the French-Swiss border before relocating to Eastern Prussia in September 1940 where it remained until June 1941.

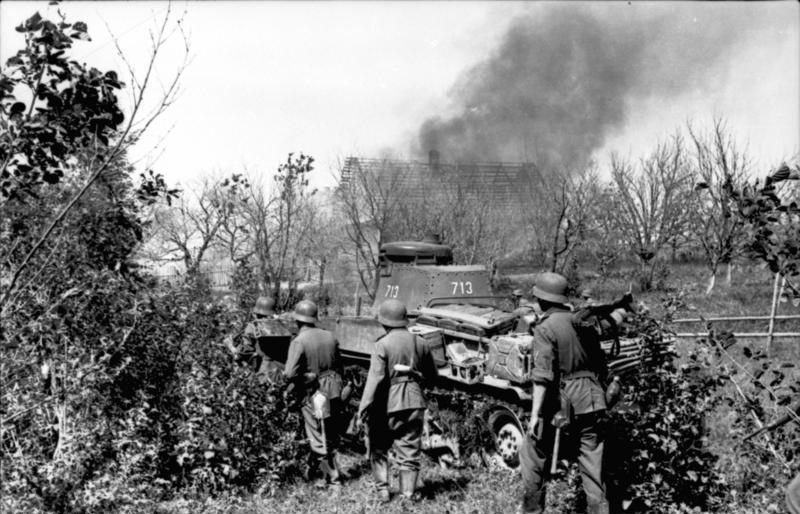
6th Panzer division troops on the Eastern Front, 1941

At the time of the German invasion of the Soviet Union the division had 239 tanks, but only twelve of those were Panzer III, which still struggled to pierce the armour of Soviet tanks such as the T-34 and KV-1. In June 1941, it joined Operation Barbarossa, fighting at first under Army Group North for Leningrad. At the Battle of Raseiniai two of its Kampfgruppes consisted of:

- Kampfgruppe Von Seckendorff consisting of the 114th Motorized infantry Regiment, Panzer Reconnaissance Battalion 57, one company of Panzerjäger Battalion 41 and Motorcycle Battalion 6 (morning).
- Kampfgruppe Raus consisted of Panzer Regiment 11, one battalion of the 4th Motorized infantry Regiment, the 1st and 3rd Battalions of the 76th Artillery Regiment, one company of Panzer Engineer Battalion 57, one company from Panzerjäger Battalion 41, one battery of the 2nd Battalion Flak Regiment 411 and Motorcycle Battalion 6 (afternoon).

On 23 June, Kampfgruppe Von Seckendorff of the division, with, for that morning only, Motorcycle Battalion 6, was overrun by Gen. Yegor Solyankin's 2nd Tank Division from the 3rd Mechanised Corps near Skaudvilė. The German Panzer 35(t) tanks and infantry anti-tank weapons were ineffective against the Soviet heavy tanks—some of them were out of ammunition but closed in and destroyed German antitank guns by driving over them. The Germans concentrated on immobilising the Soviet tanks by firing at their tracks and then by tackling them with artillery, anti-aircraft guns, or by blowing them up with explosive charges of the sticky bomb type, or swarming with infantry to force grenades down the tank hatches.

6th Panzer Division was soon transferred to Army Group Center, where it fought in the Battle of Moscow and the Rzhev-Vyazma Salient. With the Soviet counter offensive in December 1941 the division was pushed back and suffered the loss of practically all its tanks and most of its vehicles. With losses severe enough to render it combat incapable, the 6th Panzer Division was sent to France to be rebuilt in March 1942 and equipped with more modern tanks. It was moved to southern France after the Allied landings in North Africa in November 1942 - Operation Torch - but soon after relocated to the southern sector of the Eastern Front after the German 6th Army had been entrapped at Stalingrad.

Operation Winter Storm

The 6th Panzer Division along with the 23rd Panzer Division former the LVII Panzer Corps of General Friedrich Kirchner which was the southern pincer of Operation Winter Storm. Ultimately, failed German attempt to break through to the encircled forces but then had to retreat to escape encirclement itself. The division was part of the German retreat and successful counter offensive at Kharkov and the failed attempt to regain initiative in the Battle of Kursk.

On 22 November 1943, the 6th Panzer Division possessed 38 tanks, of which 25 were operational. This rendered it the third-weakest panzer division of Army Group South; only 23rd Panzer Division and Großdeutschland were weaker.

The 6th Panzer Division was part of the partially successful relief operation at the Korsun-Cherkassy Pocket as well as the escape from the Kamenets-Podolsky pocket. After the retreat through Ukraine the division was sent to Germany for reorganisation but hastily returned to the Eastern Front in July, after the destruction of Army Group Center in the Soviet Operation Bagration. It was part of the German defence of northern Poland and East Prussia before being relocated to Hungary in December 1944. It took part in the battles around Siege of Budapest before retreating into Austria and taking part in the defence of Vienna. When the city fell it moved into Czechoslovakia where it surrendered to US 3rd Army in May 1945 but was handed over to Soviet forces.

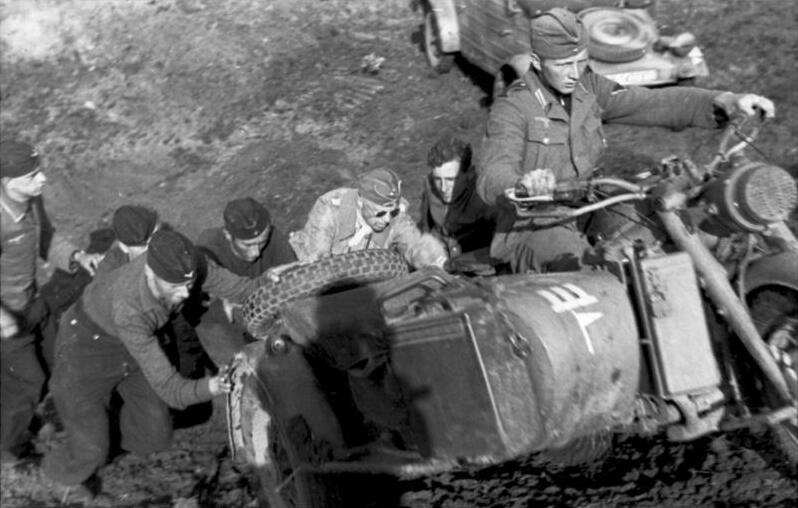
General Johann Mickl of 11. Panzer-Division lends a hand getting a motorcycle up a hill.

== War crimes ==
Soldiers of the division allegedly executed an unknown number of black prisoners of war from the 12th Senegalese Tirailleurs regiment in mid-June 1940. It is estimated that, of the 40,000 black soldiers from the French colonies engaged in combat with German forces during the battle of France 1,500 to 3,000 died either during or after combat.

== Commanders ==
The commanders of the division:

- Generalleutnant Erich Hoepner (10 November 1938 – 23 November 1938)
- Generalmajor Friedrich-Wilhelm von Loeper (24 November 1938 – 12 October 1939)
- General der Panzertruppe Werner Kempf (18 October 1939 – 6 January 1941)
- Generalleutnant Franz Landgraf (6 January 1941 – June 1941)
- Generalleutnant Franz Landgraf (15 September 1941 – 1 April 1942)
- Generaloberst Erhard Raus (1 April 1942 – 7 February 1943)
- Generalleutnant Walther von Hünersdorff (7 February 1943 – 16 July 1943)
- Generalmajor Wilhelm Crisolli (16 July 1943 – 21 August 1943)
- Generalleutnant Rudolf Freiherr von Waldenfels (21 August 1943 – 8 February 1944)
- Generalleutnant Werner Marcks (8 February 1944 – 21 February 1944)
- Generalleutnant Rudolf Freiherr von Waldenfels (21 February – 13 March 1944)
- Generalleutnant Walter Denkert i.V. (13 March 1944 – 28 March 1944)
- Generalleutnant Rudolf Freiherr von Waldenfels (28 March 1944 – 23 November 1944)
- Oberst Friedrich-Wilhelm Jürgens (23 November 1944 – 20 January 1945)
- Generalleutnant Rudolf Freiherr von Waldenfels (20 January 1945 – 8 May 1945)

== Organisation ==
The organisation of the division:

1940 – Battle of France

- Panzer-Regiment 11
- Panzer-Abteilung 65 (until June 1942)
- Schützen-Brigade 6
  - Schützen-Regiment 4
  - Kradschützen-Bataillon 6
- Artillerie-Regiment 76
- Aufklärungs-Abteilung 57
- Panzerjäger-Abteilung 41
- Pionier-Bataillon 57
- Nachrichten-Abteilung 82
- Versorgungstruppen 57

1943 – Eastern Front

- Panzer-Regiment 11
- Panzergrenadier-Regiment 4
- Panzergrenadier-Regiment 114
- Panzer-Artillerie-Regiment 76
- Heeres-Flak-Artillerie-Abteilung 298
- Panzer-Aufklärungs-Abteilung 6
- Panzerjäger-Abteilung 41
- Panzer-Pionier-Bataillon 57
- Panzer-Nachrichten-Abteilung 82
- Panzer-Versorgungstruppen 57

== See also ==
- SS Panzer Division order of battle
- Panzer division

== Literature ==
- Ritgen, Helmut (1982). The 6th Panzer Division 1937–45. Osprey Vanguard. Vol. 28. Oxford: Osprey Publishing. ISBN 0850454530.
