= Yegor Solyankin =

- Егор Николаевич Солянкин
- Born: 21 April 1901; Moscow, Russian Empire
- Died: 26 June 1941 (aged 40) near Raseiniai, Lithuanian SSR, Soviet Union
- Military career
- Branch: Red Army
- Service years: 1920–1941
- Rank: Major general
- Commands: 2nd Tank Division
- Conflicts: World War II; Battle of Raseiniai †

Yegor Nikolaevich Solyankin (Russian: Егор Николаевич Солянкин; 21 April 1901–26 June 1941) was a Red Army major general. Solyankin led the 2nd Tank Division during the Battle of Raseiniai, a Soviet counterattack after the German invasion of the Soviet Union. He was killed in action during the defeat of his division.

== Early life and Russian Civil War ==
Solyankin was born on 21 April 1901 in Moscow. He was orphaned at age four and was sent to be raised in a peasant family in a village in Gzhatsky Uyezd. Solyankin was a shepherd in the village. From the age of twelve he worked as a blacksmith in Moscow. On 17 June 1920, he was conscripted into the Red Army at Gzhatsk during the Russian Civil War. Sent to the 16th Reserve Rifle Regiment of the Moscow Military District at Dorogobuzh, Solyankin became a cadet at the 5th Petergof Infantry Course in September. His training was interrupted by being sent to fight on the Southern Front with the 1st Petrograd Cadet Brigade against the Army of Wrangel and the Revolutionary Insurrectionary Army of Ukraine in Taurida Governorate between October 1920 and February 1921.

== Interwar period ==
After the end of the Russian Civil War, Solyankin graduated from the 65th Yevpatoriya Commanders Course in 1921 and continued training at the supplemental department of the 63rd Simferopol Infantry Course. After completing training at the latter in September 1922 he was appointed to the 40th Rifle Regiment of the 14th Rifle Division of the Moscow Military District at Moscow. Solyankin spent the next seven years with the regiment, successively serving as a squad leader, assistant platoon commander, platoon commander, acting company commander, and company politruk. During this period he received further training at the Commanders Refresher Course in Moscow between October 1924 and August 1925 and entered the Moscow Military-Political Course in October 1928. Solyankin graduated from the latter in August 1929 and in November of that year transferred to the Ryazan Infantry School to serve as a course commander. He was sent to the Vystrel course in February 1931 and upon completion of the course returned to the 14th Rifle Division as an assistant battalion commander in its 42nd Rifle Regiment. He simultaneously served as military commandant of Shuya from October of that year.

Solyankin was seconded to the Leningrad Armored Commanders Improvement Course in December for training as an officer in the emerging Red Army tank forces, and upon graduation in May 1932 returned to the 14th Rifle Division to serve as chief of staff of the training battalion at Vladimir. A month later, he was transferred to the Separate Training Tank Regiment at Moscow, serving as assistant commander of a training tank battalion, acting assistant commander for training units of the regiment, and as a battalion commander. Solyankin commanded the tank battalion of the 1st Kazan Rifle Division from January 1934 and in June 1937 became commander of the 2nd Reserve Tank Brigade of the Leningrad Military District. After commanding the 9th Mechanized Brigade of the 7th Mechanized Corps from August 1938, then-Kombrig Solyankin was appointed commander of the 18th Light Tank Brigade in December 1939, when it was stationed in Estonia at Uuemõisa as a result of the Soviet–Estonian Mutual Assistance Treaty, and participated in the Soviet annexation of Estonia in June 1940. During the annexation, the brigade advanced into Tallinn. On 4 June 1940, he was promoted to Major General. He then served as deputy commander of the 1st Mechanized Corps from August 1940. Solyankin became commander of the 2nd Tank Division, part of the 3rd Mechanized Corps, on 9 December. The division was stationed in the area of Ukmergė, northeast of Kaunas. In the early summer of 1941 he arranged for the evacuation of the families of officers, although this was not officially permitted.

== World War II ==
During the invasion of Russia, the 3rd Mechanized Corps mounted a counterattack against the advancing XXXXI Panzer Corps in what became known as the Battle of Raseiniai. The 2nd Tank Division had marched a hundred kilometers from Kėdainiai on 23 June to make its planned assault the following day. The division had six different types of tanks, including 32 KV-1s, 19 KV-2s, and 50 T-34s. Nearly half of the KVs broke down during the march and had to be abandoned as they could not be repaired. The KV tanks and T-34s of the division surprised the troops of the 6th Panzer Division, who were unaware of the existence of the Soviet tanks. The attack caused temporary panic, but the German forces counterattacked when the 2nd Tank Division ran out of fuel and ammunition after making six attacks. The 1st Panzer Division and the 36th Infantry Division flanked Solyankin's division and its rear area was captured after the 8th Panzer Division took Kėdainiai. On 25 June, Solyankin led a breakout attempt with the 2nd Tank Division's remaining heavy tanks leading. The remnants of the division were destroyed in the attempt and Solyankin himself was killed on 26 June. The location of his burial is unknown. He was survived by his wife, Varvara Vasilievna, a daughter, Raisa, and a son, Alexander.
