= Alexey Kurkin =

Soviet Army colonel general (1901–1948)

- Native name: Алексей Васильевич Куркин
- Born: 30 March 1901; Kharkov, Kharkov Governorate, Russian Empire
- Died: 16 March 1948 (aged 46) Moscow, Soviet Union
- Buried: Novodevichy Cemetery
- Allegiance: Soviet Union
- Branch: Red Army (to 1946); Soviet Army (from 1946)
- Service years: 1918–1948
- Rank: Colonel general
- Commands: 5th Tank Division; 3rd Mechanized Corps; 26th Army; 9th Tank Corps
- Conflicts: Russian Civil War; World War II; Soviet invasion of Poland; Baltic Operation; Battle of Raseiniai; Battle of Moscow; Battle of Kursk; Battle of the Dnieper; Dnieper-Carpathian Offensive; Second Jassy–Kishinev Offensive; Battle of Debrecen; Siege of Budapest; Vienna Offensive; Prague Offensive; Manchuria Offensive
- Awards: Order of Lenin; Order of the Red Banner (2); Order of Suvorov, 1st class (2); Order of Kutuzov, 1st class (2); Order of the Red Star

Alexey Vasilievich Kurkin (Russian: Алексей Васильевич Куркин; 30 March [O.S. 17 March] 1901–16 March 1948) was a Soviet Army colonel general.

== Biography ==
Born on 30 March 1901 in Kharkov, Kurkin joined the Red Army when he was 17. During the Russian Civil War, Kurkin commanded an armored train on the Southern Front. He became a commissar after the war. After graduating from the Military Academy of Mechanization and Motorization, Kurkin commanded tank brigades and then a tank division. In January 1941 he was appointed commander of the 3rd Mechanized Corps. The corps fought in the Baltic Operation after the German invasion of the Soviet Union in June 1941, in which it was virtually destroyed. Kurkin escaped capture and became deputy commander of the 1st Guards Special Rifle Corps. After the corps became the 26th Army, Kurkin took command of the army. The army suffered heavy losses in the Battle of Moscow and was disbanded. He became commander of the Armored and Mechanized Forces of the Northwestern Front. From May to October 1942 he led the 9th Tank Corps, and then the Saratov Tank Camp. In January 1943 he became deputy commander of the Armored and Mechanized Forces of the Red Army. In July 1943 he took command of the Armored and Mechanized Forces of the Steppe Front, which became the 2nd Ukrainian Front. In July 1945 Kurkin became commander of the Armored and Mechanized Forces of the Transbaikal Front. In 1946, he became General Inspector of the General Inspectorate of the Armored and Mechanized Forces. Kurkin died two years later.
