= Bundeshaus (Berlin) =

Coordinates: 52°29′53.06″N 13°19′52.33″E

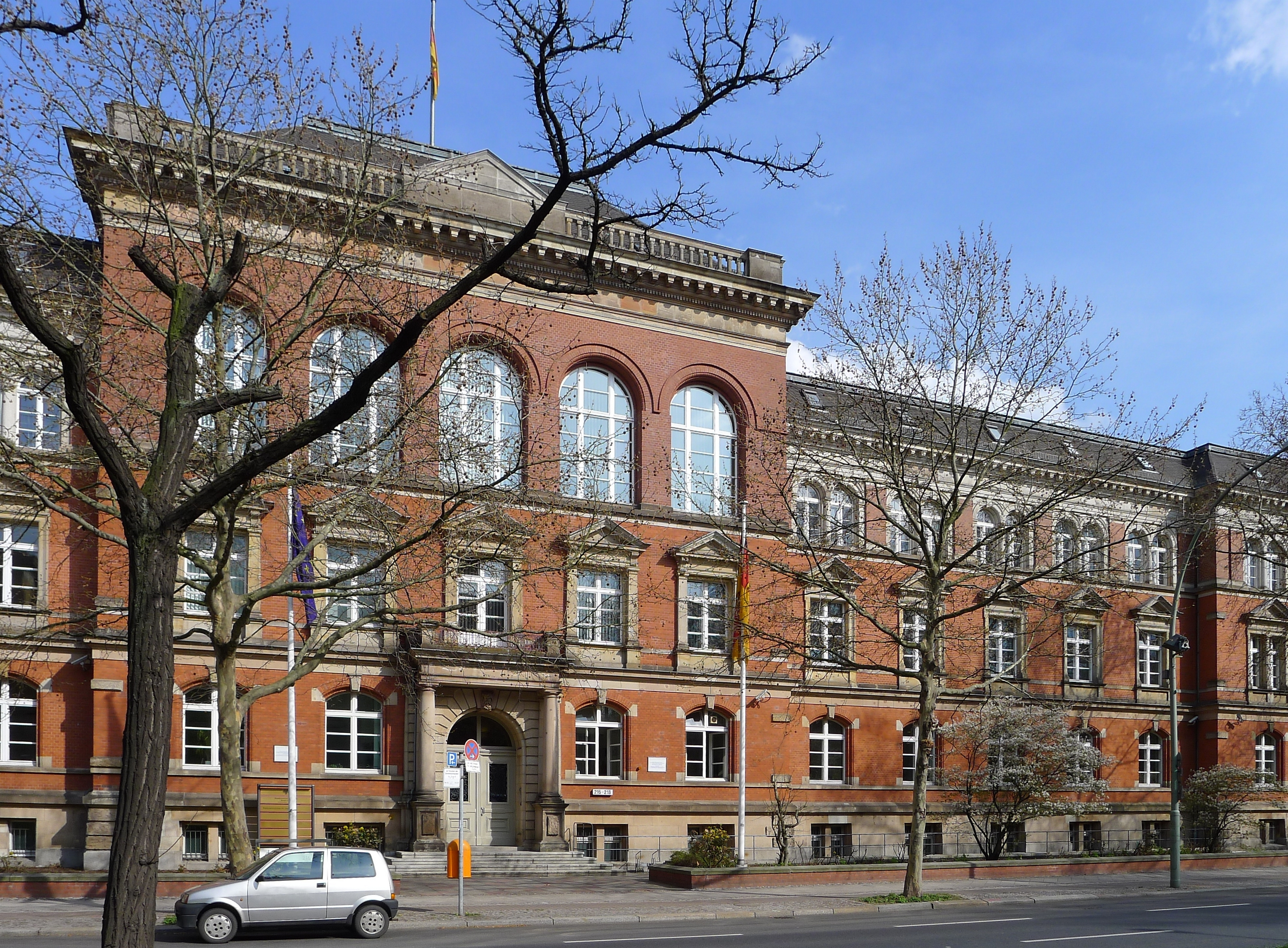
The Bundeshaus (Federal House), seen from Bundesallee

The Bundeshaus (Federal House) is a building in the district of Wilmersdorf in Berlin, Germany that is the domicile of Federal Government agencies in Berlin, among others the Federal Office of Administration.

== History ==
The Bundeshaus was built between 1893 and 1895 as an administrative building for the Royal Prussian Artillerie Prüfungskommission.

After partial destruction during World War II, it was restored and re-opened by the West German Federal Chancellor Konrad Adenauer on 17 April 1950. Between 1950 and 1990 it served as the seat of the Federal Plenipotentiary (Bundesbevollmächtigter), Bonn's representative in the city of West Berlin and as the West Berlin outpost of several federal government agencies, some of which have completely moved to Berlin in separate buildings since the reunification.

== Berlin Memorial Plaque ==
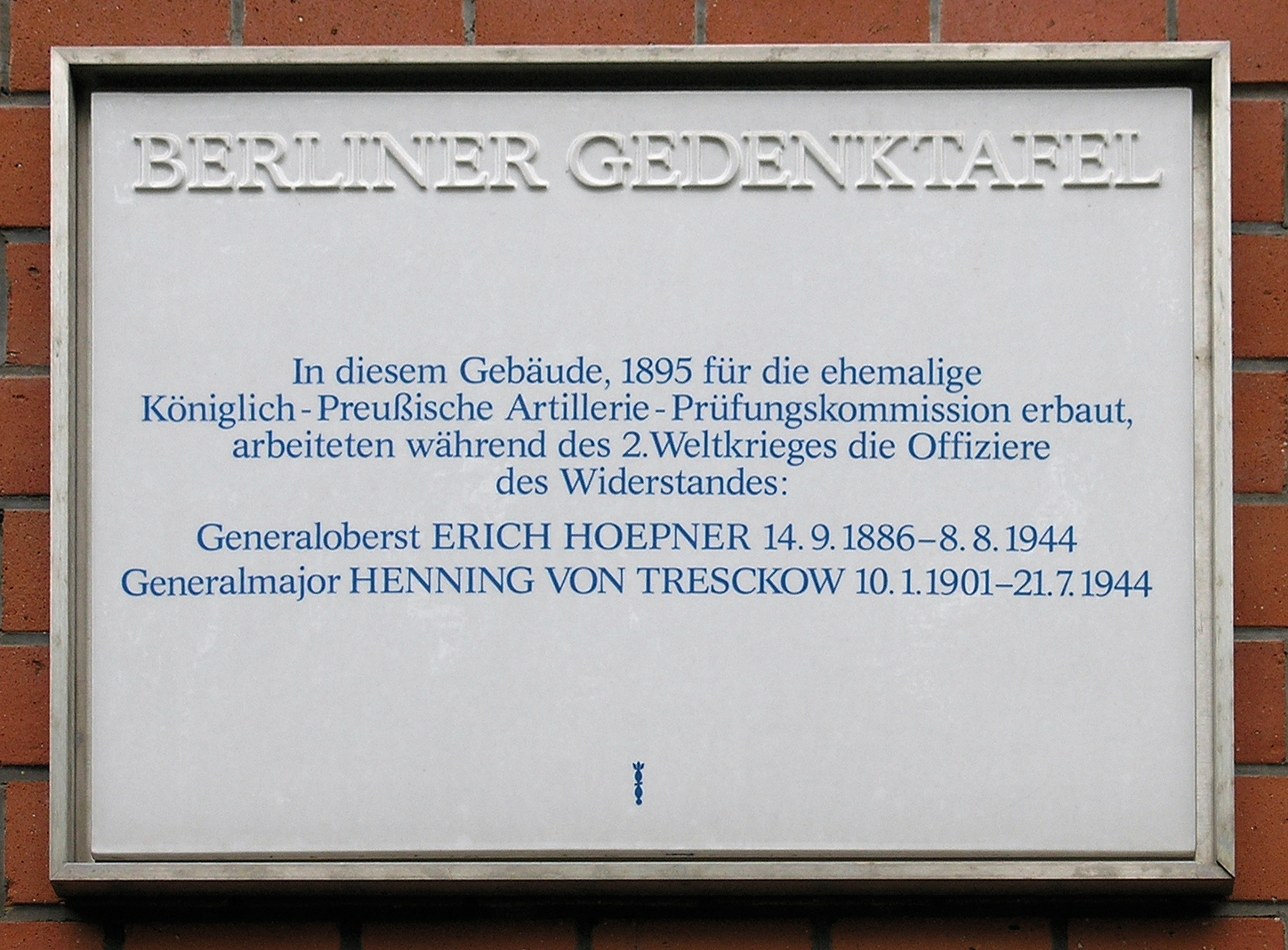
Plaque in memory of the members of the German Resistance Hoepner and von Tresckow

On 19 July 1990, a Berlin Memorial Plaque commemorating the Generals Erich Hoepner and Henning von Tresckow, who worked in the building, was unveiled in the building.
