= Alfred-Hermann Reinhardt =

Generalleutnant in the Wehrmach

Alfred Reinhardt
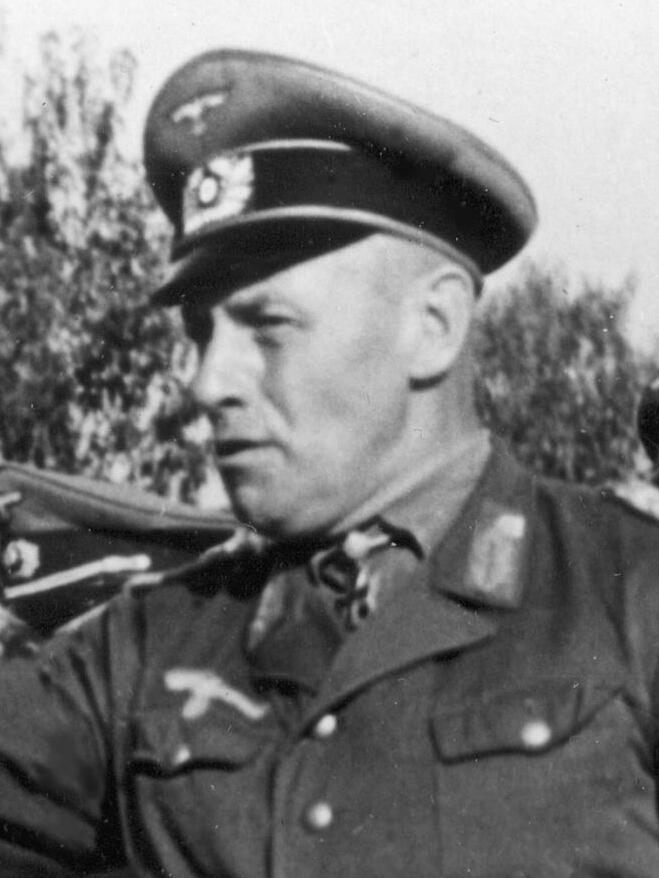
- Reinhardt in 1944
- Born: 15 November 1897; Affalterbach, Kingdom of Württemberg, German Empire
- Died: 15 January 1973 (aged 75); Öhringen, Baden-Württemberg, West Germany
- Relatives: ∞ 1924 Frida Hartlieb
- Military career
- Allegiance: German Empire; Weimar Republic; Nazi Germany
- Branch: Imperial German Army; Freikorps; Reichsheer; German Army
- Service years: 1916–1945
- Rank: Generalleutnant
- Commands: 98th Infantry Division
- Conflicts: World War I World War II: Battle of France; Operation Barbarossa; Battle of Uman; Battle of Kiev; First Battle of Kharkov; Battle of the Caucasus; Kuban bridgehead; Crimean offensive; Italian campaign
- Awards: German Cross in Gold; Knight's Cross of the Iron Cross with Oak Leaves and Swords

Alfred Hermann Reinhardt (often wrongly Alfred-Hermann; 15 November 1897 – 15 January 1973) was a highly decorated German Generalleutnant in the Wehrmacht during World War II. He was a recipient of the Knight's Cross of the Iron Cross with Oak Leaves and Swords of Nazi Germany.

A veteran of both World Wars, Reinhardt began his career as Private during World War I and distinguished himself several times. He served with the Police units during the interwar period, before he was transferred back to the Army following Adolf Hitler's rise to power. Reinhardt held all field commands from Platoon to Divisional level and participated in combats mostly on Eastern and Italian Fronts.

== Early life and World War I ==
Alfred-Hermann Reinhardt was born on 11 November 1897 in the village of Affalterbach near Backnang, Württemberg, as the son of a teacher Ferdinand Reinhard and his wife Amalie. Following his schooling and passing his Abitur, he decided to enlist the German Army during the ongoing First World War. In early January 1916, Reinhardt was assigned as Kriegsfreiwilliger (roughly equivalent to the rank of Private) to the replacement battalion of 123rd Grenadier Regiment “König Karl” in Ulm and following his basic training, he was ordered to France, where his regiment participated in the combats on the river of Yser.

During the next three years, Reinhardt took part in the combats on Somme, Arras and Flanders, being wounded in action and receiving both classes of the Prussian Iron Cross and the Württemberg Bravery Medal in Silver for his service. He was promoted to Vizefeldwebel (Sergeant) and officer aspirant in September 1918 and ordered to Isny, where he underwent a machine gun course. Reinhardt completed the course one month later and was assigned to the Württemberg Mountain Battalion. However, the war ended soon thereafter and his unit was sent to Silesia in order to help maintain order during the efforts of Polish-Silesian insurrectionists to have the area transferred to the newly founded Polish Republic.

== Interwar period ==
Reinhardt remained in Silesia until August 1919, when his unit returned to the barracks in Stuttgart and was incorporated into the provisional Reichswehr. He served in the Army until the end of October 1920, when he was discharged due to the forced reduction of armed forces with the temporary rank of Leutnant (Second lieutenant). Reinhard subsequently entered the Württemberg Schutzpolizei and upon promotion to the police rank of Leutnant (Second lieutenant) in April 1921, he served as Platoon leader and an instructor with Police Departments in Heuberg and Böblingen, Württemberg.

He was promoted to Oberleutnant (First lieutenant) in October 1924 and appointed Instructor within Officer course at Solitude Palace near Stuttgart. Reinhard was transferred to the Police preparatory school in Stuttgart one year later and held another training assignment until the beginning of the 1930s. He then completed advanced course at that school and assumed command of Hundertschaft, a 100 men police unit roughly in the size of company, in Esslingen at the suburbs of Stuttgart. He was promoted to Hauptmann (Captain) in November 1932.

Following the creation of Wehrmacht, Reinhardt was transferred to the Army and assigned to the 55th Infantry Regiment in Würzburg, Bavaria. He served on the regimental staff under future general, Colonel Bruno Bieler until April 1936, when he assumed command of 4th Machine Gun Company in his regiment. While in this capacity, Reinhardt was promoted to Major in October that year and assumed command of regimental replacement battalion in December 1938.

== World War II ==
=== Early years ===
Shortly before the outbreak of World War II, Reinhardt's battalion was used to form the 2nd Battalion within newly established 480th Infantry Regiment and ordered to the border triangle of common borders of Germany, Switzerland and France. He thus could not participate in the Invasion of Poland in September 1939 and his unit was held in the reserve. Reinhardt was promoted to Oberstleutnant (lieutenant colonel) in March 1940.

However, during the Battle of France in June 1940, Reinhardt and his battalion were finally deployed to the combat and he led his unit during the siege on cities of Dijon and Chalon-sur-Saône in Eastern France. He distinguished himself during that combats and was decorated with the Clasps to his Iron Cross.

In November 1940, Reinhardt was transferred to the Troop Training Grounds in Münsingen, Württemberg where he joined the newly established 421st Infantry Regiment as commander of the 1st Battalion. He spent several months with training, before his battalion was ordered to Yugoslavia by the end of April 1941 as the part of 125th Infantry Division.

=== Eastern Front ===
The division arrived to the Eastern Front in July 1941 during the ongoing Operation Barbarossa, the German Invasion of Soviet Union. Reinhardt was promoted to the commander of 421st Infantry Regiment after only several weeks in Russia and took part in the battle at Uman where he was slightly wounded.

Reinhardt subsequently led his regiment during the encirclement of Kiev, when he distinguished himself with the capture of the village of Tarassowka at the outskirts of Kiev on 20 September 1941. Due to his actions, the Germans were able to prevent a large portion of Soviet soldiers escaping the Kiev pocket and Reinhardt presumably had a key part in this major tactical success with far-reaching operational significance. Reinhardt was praised by his division commander, Generalmajor Wilhelm Schneckenburger and received the Knight's Cross of the Iron Cross, the highest decoration of Nazi Germany awarded for bravery in combat.

He then participated in the capture of Kharkov in October that year and promoted to Oberst (Colonel) one month later. After a period of combats at Mius river in the Donetsk Region, Reinhardt and his regiment were sent to reinforce German and Romanian units during the combats near Novorossisk, the large port city on the coast of Black Sea in summer 1942 and proceeded to Caucasus by the end of September that year. For his service during that early stages of Caucasus operation, Reinhardt was decorated with the German Cross in Gold.

In October 1942, Reinhardt supervised the transformation of his unit to 421st Grenadier Regiment and then led his regiment during the withdrawal to the Kuban bridgehead in the Taman Peninsula in early 1943. He distinguished himself again by the end of July 1943, when during the battles for the Kuban bridgehead, the Soviets broke through the left wing of the 73rd Infantry Division between the villages of Dolgaja-Berg and Neberdshajewskaja. In response the 421st Grenadier Regiment, under the command of Reinhardt, was removed from the frontline and sent into a counterattack on 25–26 July 1942. After a very hard battle the old German line along the Kamm river between Neberdshaj and Bogago-Tal was retaken. By this action the destabilization of the Kuban bridgehead was prevented, and Reinhardt again was praised for his actions. Based on the recommendations from both division commander, Generalleutnant Helmut Friebe and corps commander, General Maximilian de Angelis, Reinhardt was decorated with the Oakleaves to his Knight's Cross of the Iron Cross.

Moreover, Reinhardt also received the high Romanian Order of Michael the Brave and was recommended for the Division's commander course. He was succeeded in the command of regiment in August 1943 and transported back to Germany, where he was officially assigned to the Führer Reserve and attended the four-weeks course for division commanders in Berlin. General Kurt Brennecke who was in charge of the course, rated Reinhardt as very suitable for division command.

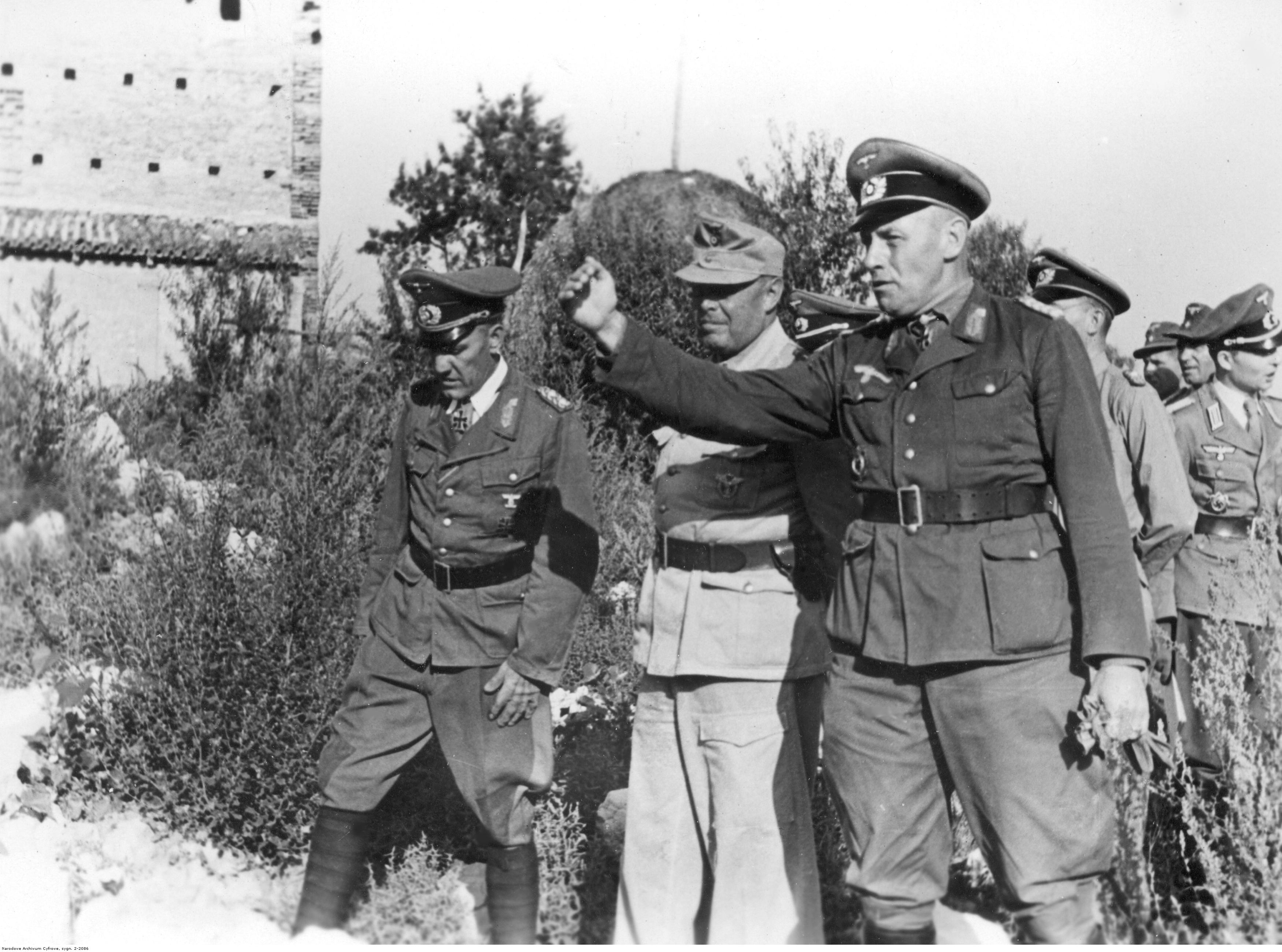
Reinhardt gives the situational briefing to Field Marshal Albert Kesselring (center) and General Joachim Witthöft, Liguria, October 1944.

Reinhardt returned to the Eastern Front in early November 1943 and joined the staff of 73rd Infantry Division located at Melitopol in southeastern Ukraine. He served as Deputy to Generalleutnant Hermann Böhme for two weeks, before he was transferred to the same capacity on the staff of 370th Infantry Division under Generalleutnant Fritz Becker near Mykolaiv.

Finally, Reinhardt was promoted to the rank of Generalmajor on 1 February 1944, and was given his own command on divisional level, the 98th Infanterie-Division. His new unit was located on Kerch Peninsula, struggling with advancing Soviet forces. Reinhardt led his division during the heavy combats with the Red Army and even he was praised for his performance by generals Erwin Jaenecke and Karl Allmendinger, it soon became obvious that the situation was totally untenable and the German forces would be overrun. When the Soviets launched the series of offensives the 98th Division was destroyed during the initial attacks and the remnants were transported from Sevastopol by sea to Romania and then by train to Croatia, including Reinhardt himself.

=== Italian Front ===
Upon his arrival at Zagreb, Reinhardt was tasked with the reform of his division for which he used its surviving elements and the staff of the recently destroyed 387th Infantry Division. He then received another training grenadier regiment and departed with his division to Rimini, Italy in August 1944. Shortly after his arrival, Reinhardt was promoted to Generalleutnant by Generalfeldmarschall Albert Kesselring based on the recommendations from his previous superior generals.

His division was immediately thrown into action and assigned to the defense of Rimini. Reinhardt distinguished himself during the combats near Bologna and Bagnacavallo and received Swords to his Knight's Cross of the Iron Cross in late 1944. He was also mentioned in Wehrmachtbericht, the daily Wehrmacht High Command mass-media communiqué which was broadcast daily by the Reich Broadcasting Corporation within the whole Nazi Germany.

Reinhardt led his division during the combats on Senio and Po rivers in early 1945, before the division was withdrawned to the Alps. He was succeeded in command of the division by Generalmajor Otto Schiel on 11 April 1945, shortly after Allies launched their Spring offensive, and transferred to the Führer Reserve. Reinhardt then temporarily served on the headquarters of military district VII in München, Bavaria, before he was captured by British Army on 2 May 1945.

== Postwar years ==
Reinhardt was released from captivity before the end of 1948 and settled in Öhringen, Württemberg. He worked as sales representative for bike company Carle in his hometown and also was involved in veteran's group in Heilbronn. He was also a member of the Schnez-Truppe, a clandestine shadow army intended to fight against the Soviet Union in the event of an invasion, or German communists during a civil war. Generalleutnant Alfred-Hermann Reinhardt died on 15 January 1973, aged 75 at his home. Since 1924, he was married to Frida, née Hartlieb, widowed Siebeck, with no children.

== Awards and decorations ==
- Military Merit Medal (Württemberg) for Bravery in Silver (WMVM2/WsM) on 14 March 1917
- Iron Cross (1914), 2nd and 1st Class
  - 2nd Class on 31 August 1917
  - 1st Class on 31 July 1919
- Wound Badge (1918) in Mattweiß (Silver) on 4 February 1919
- Silesian Eagle, 2nd and 1st Class
  - 2nd Class on 4 August 1919
  - 1st Class on 16 September 1919
- Hungarian War Commemorative Medal with Swords and Helmet on 20 April 1933
- Tyrolean State Memorial Medal (Tiroler Landesdenkmünze 1914–1918) on 11 May 1933
- Honour Cross of the World War 1914/1918 with Swords on 12 December 1934
- Wehrmacht Long Service Award, 4th to 2nd Class on 2 October 1936
- Medal to Commemorate the 13 March 1938
- Repetition Clasp 1939 to the Iron Cross 1914, 2nd and 1st Class
  - 2nd Class 25 June 1940
  - 1st Class on 27 July 1940
- Wound Badge (1939) in Silver on 4 August 1941
- Infantry Assault Badge in Silver on 31 October 1941
- Order of Michael the Brave, 3rd Class on 7 August 1943
- Winter Battle in the East 1941–42 Medal on 3 September 1942
- Kuban Shield
- German Cross in Gold on 4 September 1942 as Oberst and Commander of the Infanterie-Regiment 421
- Knight's Cross of the Iron Cross with Oak Leaves and Swords
  - Knight's Cross on 4 December 1941 as Oberstleutnant and Commander of the Infanterie-Regiment 421
  - 306th Oak Leaves on 28 September 1943 as Oberst and Commander of the Grenadier-Regiment 421
  - 118th Swords on 24 December 1944 as Generalleutnant and Commander of the 98. Infanterie-Division

Military offices
Preceded by Generalleutnant Martin Gareis	Commander of 98th Infanterie-Division; 1 February 1944 – 11 April 1945	Succeeded by Generalmajor Otto Schiel
