= Battle of Lenino =

World War II battle (October 1943)

- Part of the Eastern Front of World War II
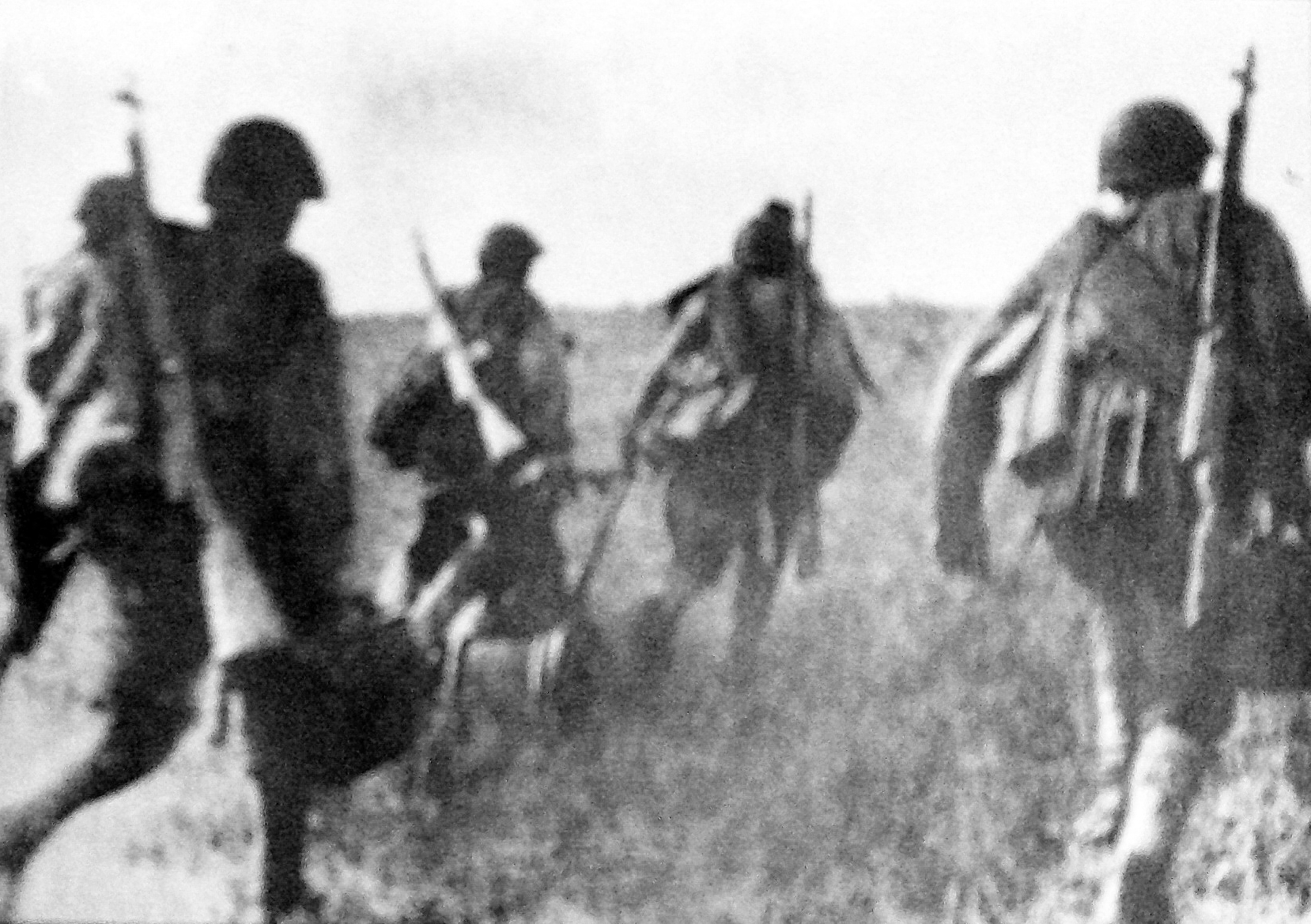
- Troops of the Polish 1st Tadeusz Kościuszko Infantry Division at the Battle of Lenino.
Date	12–13 October 1943
Location	Lenino, Byelorussian SSR, Soviet Union 54.4114°N 31.1228°E
Result	Indecisive, See Aftermath
Territorial changes	Limited territorial gains for the Soviet-Polish forces

Belligerents
Germany	Soviet Union; Poland

Commanders and leaders
(Nazi Germany) Gottfried Fröhlich	(Soviet Union) Vasiliy Nikolayevich Gordov; Zygmunt Berling

Units involved
Army Group Centre: German 4th Army	33rd Soviet Army; Polish 1st Tadeusz Kościuszko Infantry Division

Casualties and losses
c. 1,800	c. 3,000
- See section on casualties for further details.

The Battle of Lenino was a tactical World War II engagement that took place on 12 and 13 October 1943, north of the village of Lenino in the Mogilev region of Byelorussia. The battle itself was a part of a larger Soviet Spas-Demensk offensive operation with the aims of clearing the eastern bank of the Dnieper River of German forces and piercing the Panther-Wotan line of defences. The battle is prominent in Polish military history, as it was one of the first major engagements of Polish Armed Forces in the East.

While the Polish and Soviet forces managed to break through the German defences and inflict heavy casualties on the Germans, they were unable to keep the advance. There was a failure in cooperation from other Red Army units, and a lack of artillery support or close air cover caused by the ongoing Wehrmacht panzer counter-attack against the 10th Guards Army to the north of the 33rd Army. The division was forced to assume defensive positions, and was ordered to hold its ground due to the expected arrival in its sector of the 6th Guards Cavalry Corps, which was tasked with breaking through the German defensive position.

The relief never arrived; after two days the Polish 1st Tadeusz Kościuszko Infantry Division suffered 25% casualties and had to be withdrawn, while the remaining Soviet forces were too weak to widen the achieved breakthrough.

== Before the battle ==
=== Opposing forces ===
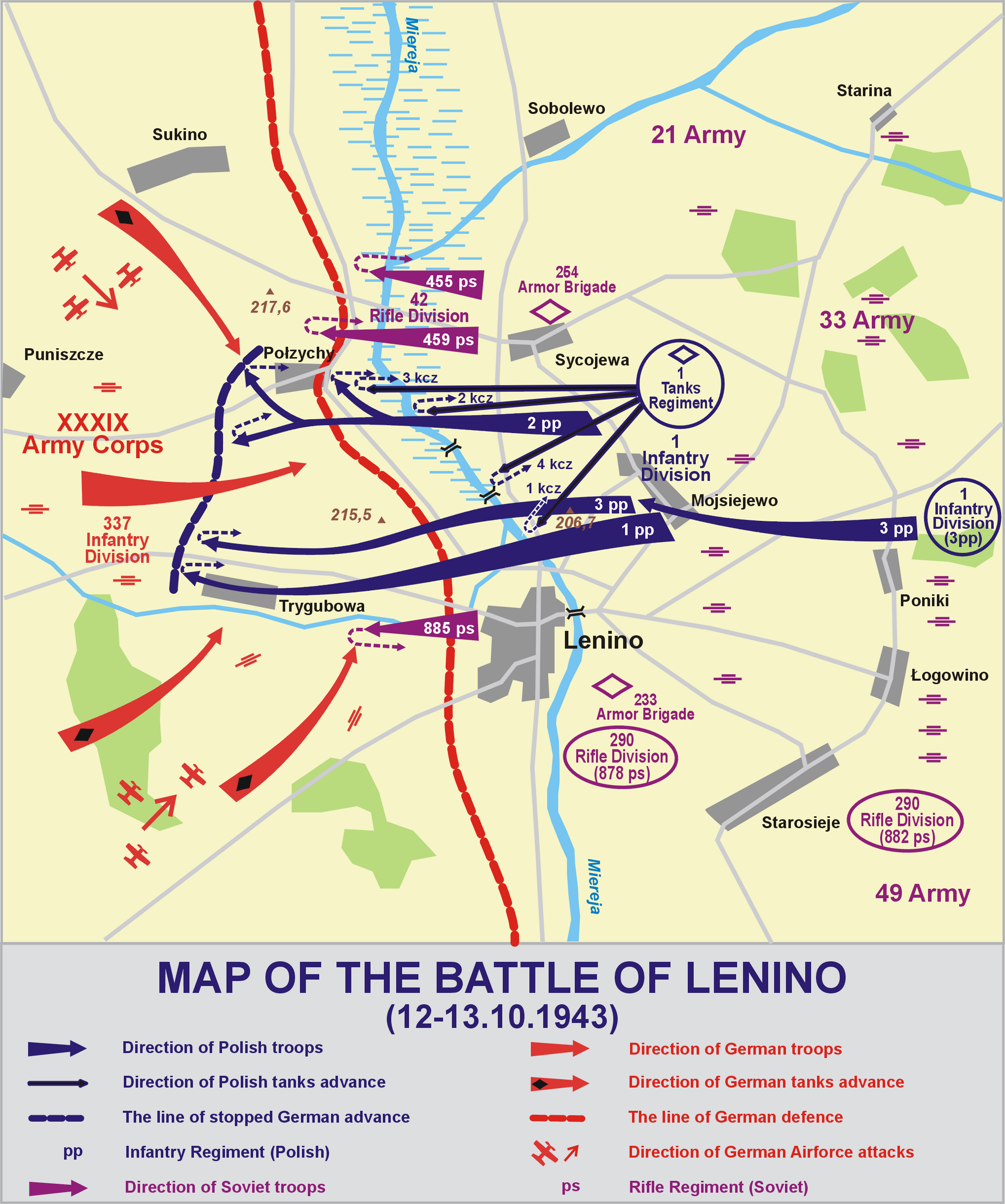
Map of the battle of Lenino

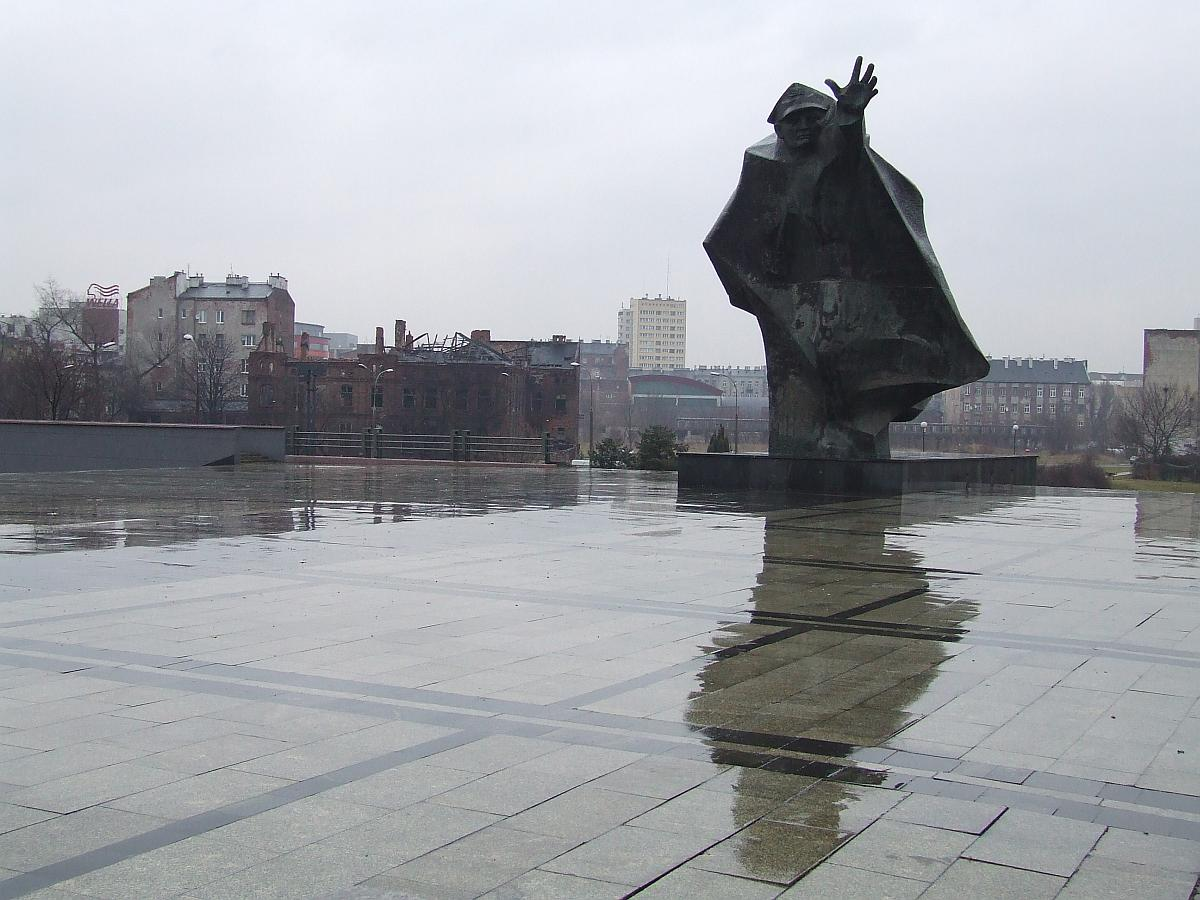
The monument to the 1st Infantry Division in Warsaw

On the Soviet side of the front line, the main assault was to be carried out by the Polish 1st Tadeusz Kościuszko Infantry Division, aided by tanks of the 1st Polish Tank Regiment, light artillery regiments from the Soviet 144th and 164th Infantry Divisions, as well as the 538th Mortar Regiment and the 67th Howitzer Brigade from the Army's reserves. Both flanks of the Polish division were to be secured by the Soviet 42nd (assaulting the village of Sukhino) and 290th Rifle Divisions (assaulting Lenino itself).

However, the Polish division was seriously under-equipped and inadequately trained, having been formed only four months prior to the battle. In addition, the Soviet divisions had been reduced to 4,000 men each by the start of the operation and their combat value was seriously limited.

In addition to that, the morale of the Polish division was seriously undermined by the fact that most of its soldiers were former prisoners of the Soviet Gulag concentration camp system and joining the army for them was a way to escape the prisons rather than to fight for their homeland.

The German side of the front was manned by elements of the 113th and 337th Infantry Divisions. The German units were battle-hardened and, more importantly, entrenched. As the Germans were aware of the Polish and Soviet plans, they reinforced their lines in the area with elements of the 36th Infantry division under Gottfried Fröhlich just a day before the launch of the offensive.

The main German line of defences was stretched between hills 217.6 near Sukhino to the north and hill 215.5 north of the town of Lenino. The swampy valley of the Mereya River (often written as Miereja in Polish historiography), lay in front of the German positions. While not much of an obstacle for infantry, it was uncrossable for Soviet tanks.

=== Battle plan ===
The main task of the Polish 1st Infantry Division was to break through the German defences on a two kilometre front in the vicinity of the village of Polzukhi and Hill 215.5. The gap was then to be further widened by the Soviet 42nd and 290th Rifle Divisions. In the second stage of the operation, Polish forces were to reach the line of the Pnevka river and then continue the assault towards Losiev and Churilov. Soviet forces were to assist the Poles in reaching the Dnieper River line.

== Battle ==
=== Opening moves ===
Three days prior to the actual battle, on 9 October, General Zygmunt Berling, the commanding officer of the Polish 1st Division, ordered a force recon assault on the German lines. The assault failed due to a heavy German artillery barrage, yet alarmed the German HQ of possible offensive actions in this sector of the front. In addition, the Germans reported no less than 1,000 Polish and Soviet soldiers who crossed the lines prior to the battle for fear of being sent back to the Gulag when the war was over. The German forces were as a result aware of the Polish and Soviet preparations and plans.

By 11 October the plans for a joint Polish-Soviet assault were ready and dispatched to various sub-units operating in the area. The main force of the assault was to be constituted by the Polish 1st and 2nd Infantry Regiments, with the 3rd Regiment following the 2nd in the northern sector. The enemy lines were to be paralysed by a creeping barrage lasting 100 minutes. The assault was to start at 9 a.m. on 12 October.

=== Reconnaissance in force ===
Although the plans were ready, on the evening of 11 October the Soviet command ordered the Poles to start the assault earlier than planned, with yet another attempt at a reconnaissance in force of the German lines at 6 a.m. the following day. The orders reached the 1st battalion, 1st Infantry Regiment only two hours prior to their assault.

At 5:50 a.m. the 1st battalion left its positions and started to push towards the Mereya River and the German trenches located 200 metres further westwards. Supported by only a token force of divisional artillery, the battalion's forces were met with fierce German resistance from well-prepared positions. The unit managed to reach the first line of trenches, but was then counter-attacked and suppressed in front of the German lines. The battalion suffered over 50% casualties, but held out in its improvised defensive positions for three hours, until the main assault started. It failed to reconnoitre the enemy lines however, and only discovered that the German units were much stronger than expected. Moreover, the premature assault notified the German HQ of the planned strike in this area and gave them time to prepare.

=== Main assault ===
During the eventual assault little went according to plan. The artillery barrage was due to start at 8:20 a.m., but was postponed because of thick fog. It was to last 100 minutes, but the commanding officer of the Soviet 33rd Army, General Vasili Nikolaevich Gordov, called it off after less than an hour, believing the German lines to be already destroyed by Soviet Katyusha rocket launchers.

The infantry assault started at 10 a.m. A steady line of Polish troops from the 1st Regiment reached the lines of the 1st battalion, and then the first line of German trenches almost unopposed. However, the German forces had simply withdrawn to the second line due to the artillery barrage, which allowed their forces to avoid losses. In the open fields between the German lines, the Polish infantry was being decimated by concentrated fire from German machine guns. While the second line was also captured, this victory came at a price: Soviet units that were to cover both flanks of the Polish infantry did not leave their initial positions and the Polish spearhead suffered heavy losses both from flanking machine guns and the friendly fire of Soviet artillery.

The 2nd Regiment on the northern flank fared little better. It reached the first German line almost unopposed and by noon, it had managed to capture the village of Polzukhi, which was located between the German first and second lines of trenches. The German units counter-attacked and a close-quarters fight for the burning village ensued. While it was ultimately secured by a flanking manoeuvre of the 3rd battalion, the regiment suffered tremendous losses. In addition to that, the army's supplies failed to reach the fighting units and most of its companies were short of ammunition. Because of that, any further advance had to be halted. Meanwhile, the 1st Regiment was threatened from a strong German position in the village of Trigubovo on its left flank. The village was to be secured by the Soviet 290th Infantry Division, which however failed to reach this objective. After heavy fighting the village was secured around noon, but then the logistics failed and ammunition supplies of the regiment were depleted as well.

By noon, although the Polish 1st Division had managed to strike a three kilometre deep wedge into the German lines, the assault had to be halted. Soviet tanks, that were to support the breakthrough, did not cross the Mereya river and both Soviet divisions were stopped near their initial lines. Only after noon did the tanks start to cross the river. While improvised bridges were prepared by engineers, the paths leading towards the river were swampy. The 2nd tank company lost five tanks to malfunctions, two to enemy fire, while the remaining three could not reach the river crossings at all. The 1st tank company was to cross the river via a bridge in Lenino. Moreover, their advance was halted by German aerial bombardment, suffering further losses during the battles for Polzukhi and Trigubovo. The swampy river valley proved to be a problem to artillery as well: light infantry guns and mortars had to be carried by foot soldiers as wheeled transport could not cross the obstacle.

=== Counter-attack ===
At 2 p.m. the fog lessened and the German 337th Infantry Division mounted a counter-assault. Aided by the Luftwaffe and reserves of the German 39th Corps, the formation stormed Polish positions at Trigubova, which were held by the 2nd battalion of the 1st Regiment. The initial attack was held off, but in the end German tanks and complete aerial superiority forced the Poles to abandon their positions. The 3rd battalion tried to retake the village but failed. The Germans also attacked Polish positions at Hill 215.5 and pushed them eastwards. The 1st Regiment started to lose cohesion, the chaos further increased when its commanding officer went missing and had to be replaced by Colonel Bolesław Kieniewicz, a Soviet officer of Polish ancestry. The positions of the 2nd Regiment were also being attacked both head-on and from the flanks. A heavy barrage of Soviet howitzers prevented the unit from being completely surrounded and destroyed. The losses nevertheless, were heavy and the regiment lost the village of Polzukhi.

=== Reinforcements ===
In the evening it became clear that the Polish lines would not be able to hold out for much longer. General Berling decided to relieve the 1st Regiment and replace it with fresh troops from the 3rd Regiment, until then held in reserve. The 1st Regiment had started the battle with 2,800 soldiers, by that time it was reduced to merely 500.

At 7:20 p.m., the 3rd Regiment, supported by the remaining 16 tanks of the 1st Tank Regiment, recommenced the assault. However, by then, the German defences at the 2nd line were strengthened and proved impregnable. A series of attacks and counter-attacks proved costly to both sides, but changed little: despite all-night close-quarters fighting, the villages of Trigubovo and Polzukhi remained in German hands.

On the night of 12 October, the Polish scouting troops launched a surprise assault on the village of Tregubova and successfully destroyed the headquarters of the German 337th Infantry Division. The Germans reacted by sending some Polish-speaking German troops to the Poles' formation in order to surprise and defeat the Polish troops. Some Polish officers and soldiers were killed in the action; so were all the German infiltrators.

=== Day Two ===
At this time, the situation became clearly unfavourable for the Soviet and Polish combatants. The expected German surprise Lenino offensive was lost, and the Polish and Soviet forces also suffered considerable losses. The artillery's ammunition was also insufficient, and the unstable and complicated front line neutralized the Soviet advantage in artillery force. However, the Soviet commander V. N. Gordov still believed that they could go forward with an offensive effort. Zygmunt Berling believed that with the number of casualties on both sides that Soviet advantage was lost and instead they should switch to a defensive mode; his suggestion was unilaterally rejected. So on the morning of 13 October Gordov continued the offensive.

Berling, in his memoir, was highly critical of Gordov's stubbornness in this situation:

No matter whether the reason was stupidity or any other motives, Gordov's deed of continuing the offensive was an act of craziness.

— Zygmunt Berling

Berling did not stand still. Using his authority of a foreign force's commander, Berling directly phoned Alexander Vasilevsky—Chief of the Soviet Staff—to inform about this situation. Vasilevsky agreed with Zygmunt Berling and promised to quickly tell Stalin about this, but he suggested that Berling should not tell Gordov about this telephone conversation. While awaiting the response of Stavka, the Polish 1st Division still had to fight. Despite sending two motorized brigades of 5th Motorized Corps to the battle field, the Polish and Soviet force could not make notable gains. They had to switch to defense in order to fend off the counter strikes of the German 25th Panzer Division.

Finally, at 5:00 p.m., came the Stavka response. In the message, Stalin heavily criticized Gordov about his mistake and demanded that, by 17:00 on 14 October, Gordov had to send the 164th Rifle Division to replace the Polish troops at the battlefield. The Polish division was sent back to the General Staff to be supplemented and reinforced. The Lenino offensive was suspended permanently.

== Aftermath ==
=== Results and casualties ===
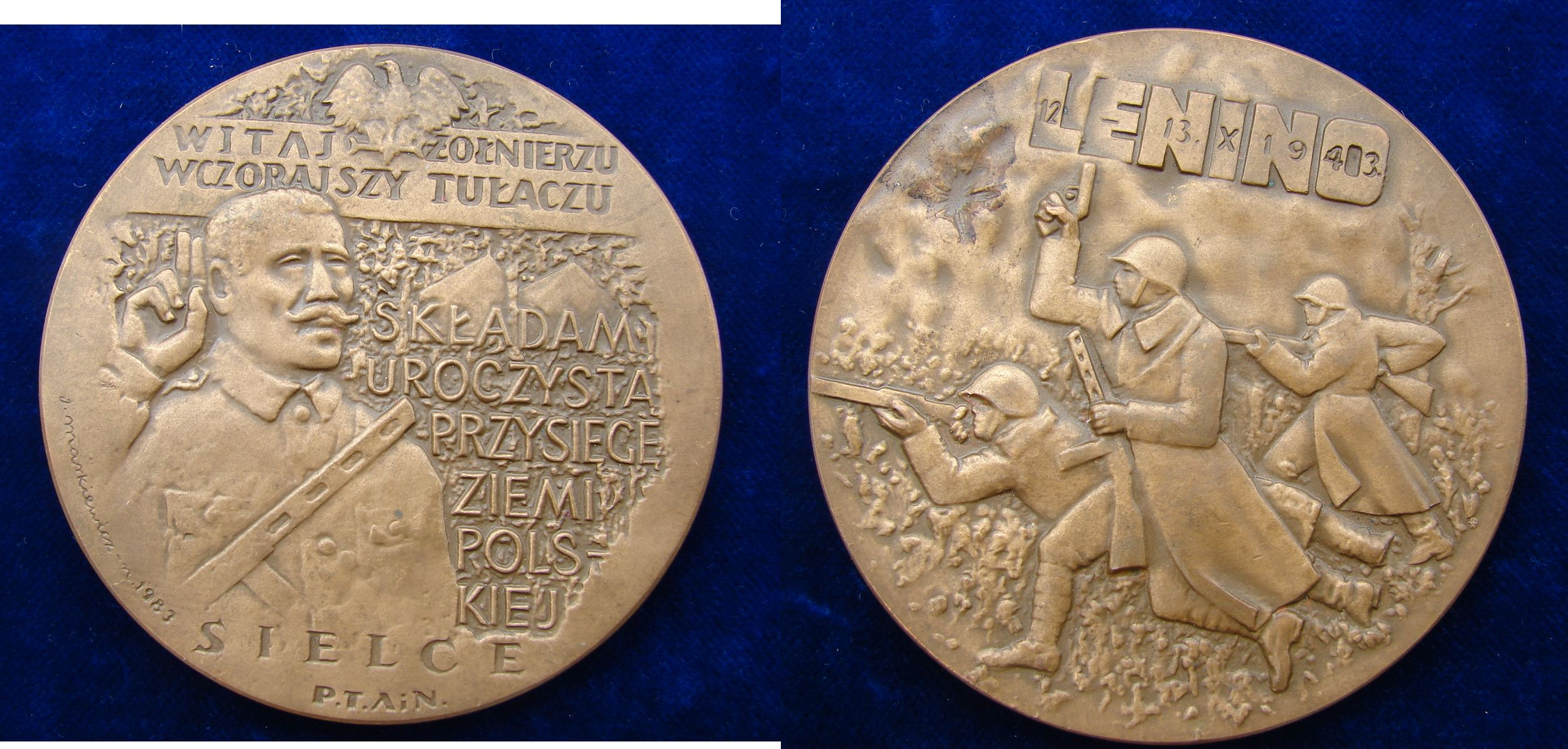
Poland Medallion 1983: Commemoration of the World War II Battle of Lenino 1943

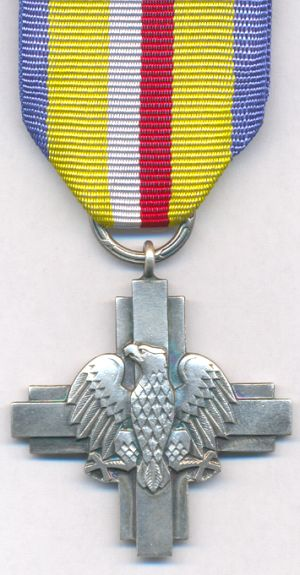
A military decoration for Polish soldiers who fought in the battle of Lenino

.

The Polish division had held its sector for two days, despite sustaining heavy losses, after which it was returned to the second echelon of the Front for rebuilding. Altogether, the 1st Division lost roughly 25-33% of its personnel in one day. Losses reached almost 3,000 men: 502 killed in action, 1,776 wounded and 663 captured or missing. It was not until spring of the following year that the division could be used in combat again.

Despite heavy losses, the Soviet-Polish troops managed to keep the Lenino bridgehead, which later played a considerable role in Operation Bagration.

German losses were heavy as well and were reported to reach 1,800, in addition to 326 German soldiers taken prisoner. The Wehrmacht also sustained heavy losses in equipment: 72 machine guns, 42 pieces of artillery, two tanks and five aeroplanes.

=== Assessment ===
In military aspect, the plan to capture the bridgehead base of Lenino was reasonable, but the timing of the offensive was not suitable. At the end of the Smolensk Offensive, the Red Army at this sector was exhausted: total remaining manpower of two Soviet divisions at Lenino was only 9,126 personnel, about 2/3 of the 1st Polish Division's strength. The Polish force, despite their high morale and strong willpower, was poorly experienced and inadequately trained. Various Polish scouting actions also allowed the Germans to predict the targets and goals of the Lenino offensive.

V. N. Gordov's stubbornness also contributed to the high casualties of the Soviet and Polish troops. At the end of 12 October, casualties of the Soviet and Polish troops had already been unacceptable, and the important Hill 217.6 height could not be taken although the last reserved force had already been used up. At that time, Gordov should have suspended the offensive in order to reorganize and resupply his depleted troops, but he did not. Gordov's grave faults were violently criticized by Berling—commander of the Polish forces—and even by Stalin.

The German front line was not strong; however, they had considerable reserve forces and a deep system of defense. The bunkers, firepoints and trenches were organized carefully. Hence, the Germans managed to quickly stabilise the situation and conduct effective counter-strikes. Furthermore, the German commander Robert Martinek also recognized the importance of Hill 217.6: from this hill the Germans could cover a large area and directly strike the whole town of Lenino using artillery. Hill 217.6 would later give the Soviets many difficulties and hardships until its bombardment by a large Katyusha barrage in June 1944.

=== Influence ===
Although a tactical and strategic failure, the battle was presented as a success by Soviet propaganda, as it was the first battle of the Soviet-backed Polish forces. In fact, the battle, while bloody, proved a political victory to the Soviet-created Union of Polish Patriots (ZPP) whose aim was to present itself as a true authority of a future Poland, an alternative to the legitimate Polish government in exile. The ZPP leaders wanted to prove before the Tehran Conference took place that Polish units in the USSR could take an active role in the fight against the Germans. In this light, the use of a barely trained division in fruitless assaults was often described as a political demonstration rather than a military operation. The battle was depicted as a victory, a "great and meaningful event in Polish history", a "milestone in the Polish struggle against fascism" and a "seal on the Polish-Soviet brotherhood of arms" by Soviet propaganda. Owing to the heavy casualties of the Polish forces, many authors described it as "carnage" or a "senseless bloodbath" or using the Polish soldiers as cannon fodder, questioning the true reasons behind sending the barely trained 1st Division into battle without proper support and with no clear objectives. Some authors go as far as to suggest that the decision was a deliberate attempt to further exterminate Poles in the Soviet Union, akin to the Katyn massacre, but this time by German hands.

After the victory of the Czechoslovak troops at the Battle of Sokolovo, this was the second time that a foreign force trained by the Soviet Union participated in the Soviet-German front. In comparison, the circumstance of the Polish force was quite different from their Czechoslovak comrades. In mid-1941, the Soviet Union also agreed to help form Anders' Army, a Polish force formed under general Władysław Anders from the Polish citizens taken captive by the Soviets in 1939–1941 and released after the Soviets were attacked by their former German allies. However, due to differences in opinions and due to the reluctance of Anders to put his malnourished, untrained and unequipped troops into battle, these Polish forces did not take part in the fight on Soviet territory. Finally, in early 1942, Anders' troops were evacuated to Iran, becoming the Polish Armed Forces in the West to fight alongside the British forces in Europe. Many of those freed prisoners who were unable to join Anders in the evacuation, joined the Polish force formed under general Zygmunt Berling, who had defected from Anders' Army. These became the Polish First Army and Polish Second Army under Soviet command. This Polish force, sometimes called "Berling's Army", played an important role in the fight against Nazi Germany and the capture of Berlin.

== Commemoration ==
After the war, the village of Trigubovo was renamed Kostyushko, a Russian language rendering of the name of Tadeusz Kościuszko, the name-sake of the Polish division. On 7 October 1950, the anniversary of the battle was declared the official "Day of the Polish Army" by the authorities of the People's Republic of Poland. In 1989, when Poland quit the Warsaw Pact and Soviet sphere of influence, the day was replaced by the pre-war Day of the Polish Army date of 15 August, which commemorates the Battle of Warsaw in 1920.

== Sources ==
- Glantz, D.M., Soviet Military Deception in the Second World War, Frank Cass, London (1989). ISBN 0-7146-3347-X.
- Zygmunt Berling. Memoirs. Vol 2. Warsawa. 1991
