= Schneckenburger =

Schneckenburger is a German surname. It may refer to:

- Manfred Schneckenburger (1938–2019), German art historian and curator of modern and contemporary art
- Max Schneckenburger (1819–1849), German poet
- Wilhelm Schneckenburger (1891–1944), German general in the Wehrmacht of Nazi Germany during World War II
