= General Reinhardt =

General Reinhardt may refer to:

- Alfred-Hermann Reinhardt (1897–1973), German Wehrmacht lieutenant general
- Emil F. Reinhardt (1888–1969), U.S. Army major general
- Georg-Hans Reinhardt (1887–1963), German Wehrmacht colonel general
- Klaus Reinhardt (born 1941), German Army general
- Walther Reinhardt (1872–1930), Imperial German Army general of the infantry

== See also ==
- Hans-Wolfgang Reinhard (1888–1950), German Wehrmacht general of the infantry
- Wilhelm Reinhard (SS officer) (1869–1955), German Schutzstaffel general
- Stanley Eric Reinhart (1893–1975), U.S. Army major general
