= Werner Friebe =

- Born: 12 July 1897
- Died: 8 March 1962 (aged 64)
- Relatives: Helmut Friebe (brother)
- Military career
- Allegiance: German Empire (to 1918); Weimar Republic (to 1933); Nazi Germany
- Branch: Army
- Service years: 1914–1945
- Rank: Generalmajor
- Commands: 8th Panzer Division
- Conflicts: World War I: World War II; Invasion of Poland; Battle of Belgium; Battle of France; Operation Barbarossa; Battle of Brody (1941); Battle of Uman; Battle of Stalingrad; Lvov–Sandomierz Offensive
- Awards: Knight's Cross of the Iron Cross

Werner Friebe (12 July 1897 – 8 March 1962) was a German general (Generalmajor) in the Wehrmacht during World War II who commanded the 8th Panzer Division. He was a recipient of the Knight's Cross of the Iron Cross. Friebe surrendered to the British forces in May 1945 and was released in 1948. He was the younger brother of General Helmut Friebe, who was also a Knight's Cross recipient.

== Awards and decorations ==
- Knight's Cross of the Iron Cross on 21 April 1944 as Oberst and commander of 8. Panzer-Division

Military offices
| Preceded by Generalmajor Gottfried Fröhlich | Commander of 8. Panzer-Division; 1 April 1944 – 21 July 1944 | Succeeded by Generalmajor Gottfried Fröhlich |
