= Adolf-Friedrich Kuntzen =

German General during World War II

Adolf Kuntzen
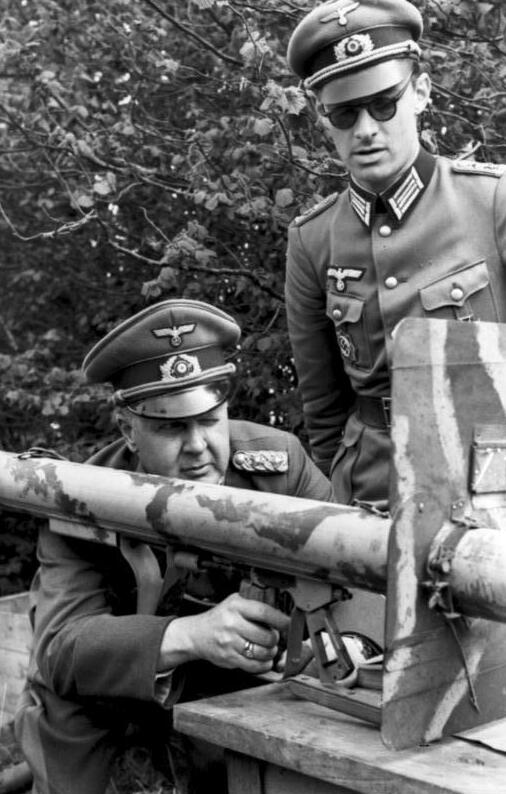
- General der Panzertruppe Adolf Kuntzen (kneeling) poses with a Panzerschreck in 1944
- Born: 26 July 1889; Magdeburg, Province of Saxony, Prussia, German Empire
- Died: 9 July 1964 (aged 74); Hannover, Lower Saxony, West Germany
- Relatives: ∞ 1914 Anne-Dörthe Martha Gravenstein; 1 daughter
- Military career
- Allegiance: Kingdom of Prussia; German Empire; Weimar Republic; Nazi Germany
- Branch: Prussian Army; Imperial German Army; Reichsheer; German Army
- Service years: 1909–1944
- Rank: General der Panzertruppe
- Commands: LXXXI Army Corps
- Conflicts: World War I World War II
- Awards: Knight's Cross of the Iron Cross

Adolf Friedrich Kuntzen (often wrongly written Adolf-Friedrich; 26 July 1889 – 9 July 1964) was a German general in the Wehrmacht during World War II who commanded the LXXXI Army-Corps under Erwin Rommel in Normandy in 1944.

== Life ==
He saw service in World War I, and served in a variety of positions in the interwar period. Promoted to Generalmajor in 1938, he assumed command of the 3rd Light Division on 10 November 1938. This unit was reorganized as the 8th Panzer Division in 1939 and Kuntzen led the division in Poland and France. On 15 March 1941 he was appointed to command the LVII Panzer Corps, which he led in Russia until 1942.

== Promotions ==
- 10 March 1909 Fahnenjunker (Officer Candidate)
- 19 November 1909 Fähnrich (Officer Cadet)
- 22 August 1910 Leutnant (2nd Lieutenant) with Patent from 22 August 1908
- 25 February 1915 Oberleutnant (1st Lieutenant)
- 18 December 1917 Rittmeister
- 1 October 1929 Major with Rank Seniority (RDA) from 1 February 1928
- 1 December 1932 Oberstleutnant (Lieutenant Colonel)
- 1 November 1934 Oberst (Colonel)
- 1 March 1938 Generalmajor (Major General)
- 1 April 1940 Generalleutnant (Lieutenant General)
- 1 April 1941 General der Panzertruppe with Rank Seniority (RDA) from 1 July 1941

== Awards and decorations ==
- Iron Cross (1914), 2nd and 1st Class
- War Merit Cross (Brunswick), 2nd and 1st Class (BrKr1/BrK1)
- Military Merit Cross (Austria-Hungary), 3rd Class with the War Decoration (
- Honour Cross of the World War 1914/1918 with Swords
- Wehrmacht Long Service Award, 4th to 1st Class
- Anschluss Medal
- Repetition Clasp 1939 to the Iron Cross 1914, 2nd and 1st Class
- Knight's Cross of the Iron Cross on 3 June 1940 as Generalleutnant and Commander of 8th Panzer Division

Military offices
Preceded by None	Commander of 3rd Light Division; 10 November 1938 - 16 October 1939	Succeeded by None
Preceded by None	Commander of 8th Panzer-Division; 16 October 1939 - 10 February 1941	Succeeded by General der Panzertruppen Erich Brandenberger
Preceded by None	Commander of LVII. Armeekorps; 15 February 1941 - 15 November 1941	Succeeded by General der Panzertruppen Friedrich Kirchner
Preceded by General der Panzertruppen Friedrich Kirchner	Commander of LVII. Armeekorps; 12 January 1942 - 31 January 1942	Succeeded by General der Panzertruppen Friedrich Kirchner
Preceded by None	Commander of LXXXI. Armeekorps; 28 May 1942 - 4 September 1944	Succeeded by General der Infanterie Friedrich-August Schack
