= Heinrich Hax =

Nazi general (1900–1969)

Heinrich Georg "Heinz" Hax
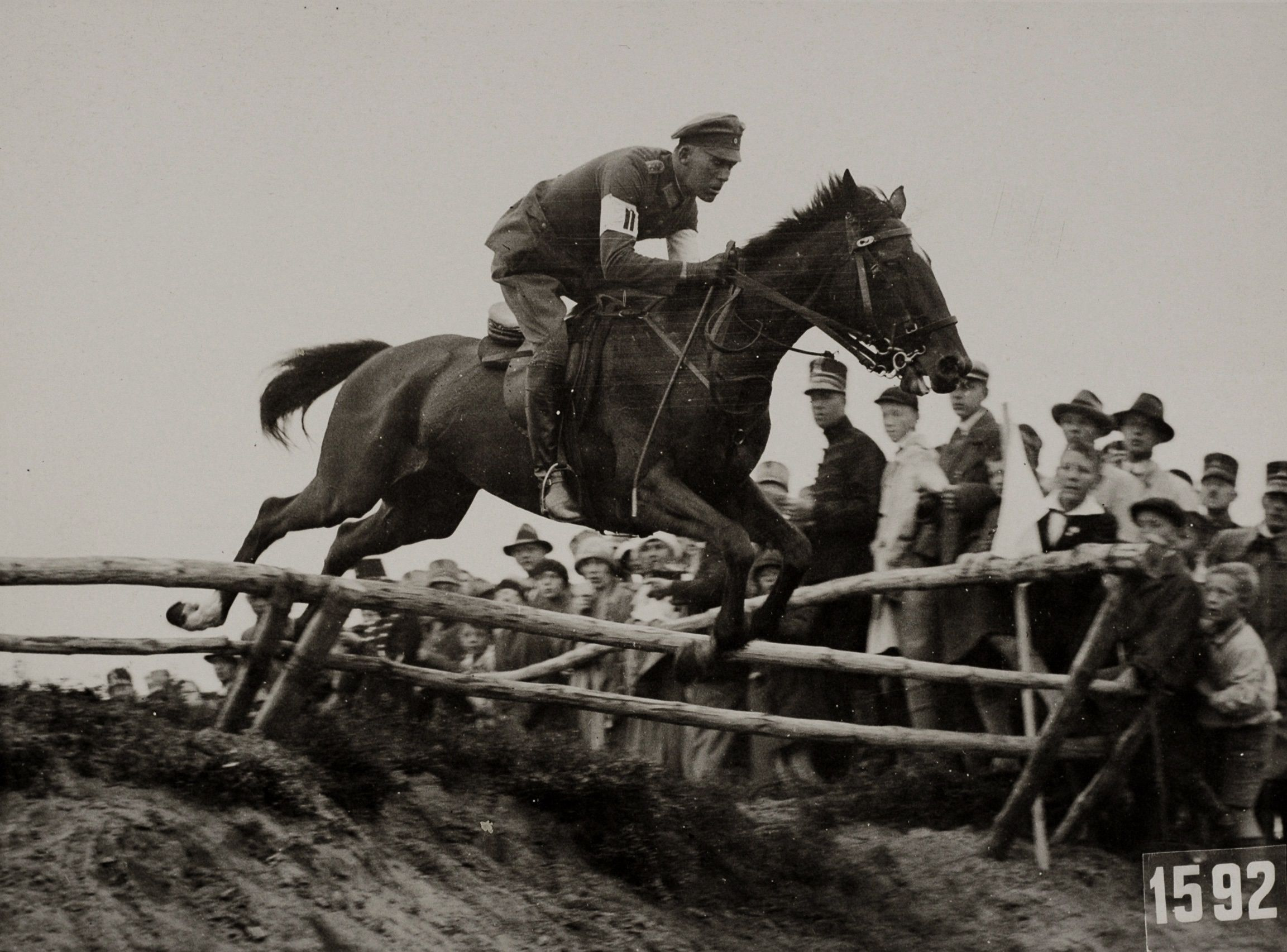
- Hax in 1928
- Born: 24 January 1900; Berlin, German Empire
- Died: 1 September 1969 (aged 69); Koblenz, West Germany
- Other name: Heinz
- Military career
- Allegiance: German Empire (to 1918); Weimar Republic (to 1933); Nazi Germany (to 1945); West Germany (1956–1961)
- Branch: Heer; Bundeswehr
- Service years: 1918–1945; 1956–1961
- Rank: Generalmajor
- Commands: 8. Panzer-Division
- Conflicts: See battles World War I World War II: Annexation of the Sudetenland; Invasion of Poland; Battle of France; Operation Barbarossa; Siege of Budapest
- Awards: Knight's Cross of the Iron Cross with Oak Leaves
- Sports career
- Sport: Men's Shooting
Medal record
Silver medal – second place	1932 Los Angeles	25 m rapid fire pistol
Silver medal – second place	1936 Berlin	25 m rapid fire pistol

Heinrich Georg "Heinz" Hax (24 January 1900 – 1 September 1969) was a German army general and sportsman.

His sports career was as a German modern pentathlete and sport shooter who competed in the 1932 Summer Olympics and in the 1936 Summer Olympics. He was a career army officer and a recipient of the Knight's Cross of the Iron Cross with Oak Leaves.

== Olympic career ==
In 1928 he finished fifth in the Olympic modern pentathlon.

Four years later he competed as sport shooter and won the silver medal in the 25 metre rapid fire pistol event. In 1936 later he won the silver medal in the same event again.

== Awards and decorations ==
- Iron Cross (1939)
  - 2nd Class (14 September 1939)
  - 1st Class (31 October 1939)
- Knight's Cross of the Iron Cross with Oak Leaves
  - Knight's Cross on 8 March 1945 as Oberst and leader of 8. Panzer-Division
  - (855th) Oak Leaves on 30 April 1945 as Generalmajor and commander of 8. Panzer-Division (Note: The sequential numbers greater than 843 for the Knight's Cross of the Iron Cross with Oak Leaves are unofficial and were assigned by the Association of Knight's Cross Recipients (AKCR) and are therefore denoted in parentheses.)

== Notes ==
Military offices
Preceded by Generalmajor Gottfried Fröhlich	Commander of 8. Panzer-Division (Wehrmacht); 5 January 1945 – 8 May 1945	Succeeded by -
Preceded by —	Commander of 3rd Armoured Division (Bundeswehr); 3 September 1956 – 14 July 1958	Succeeded by Generalmajor Christian Müller
