= 3rd Light Division =

- 3. leichte Division
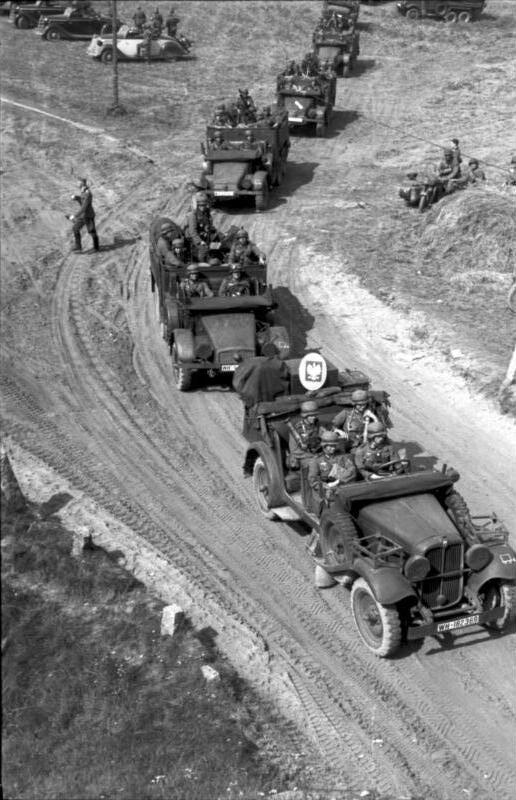
- Active: 10 November 1938 – 16 October 1939
- Disbanded: 16 October 1939
- Country: Nazi Germany
- Branch: Army
- Type: Mechanized
- Role: Mechanized warfare
- Size: Division
- Garrison/HQ: Cottbus

Commanders
- Notable commanders: Adolf-Friedrich Kuntzen

The 3rd Light Division (sometimes described as Light Mechanized or Light Panzer to distinguish it from the later Light infantry divisions) was raised in November 1938. In 1939 it fought in the Invasion of Poland. On 4 September 1939, soldiers from the division entered the region of Katowice where they met resistance from the local Polish population. In retribution 80 Polish prisoners of war were gathered in Kosciuszko Square by German soldiers and executed.

Due to shortcomings that the campaign revealed in the organization of the Light divisions it was reorganized as the 8th Panzer Division in October 1939.
