= 702nd Infantry Division =

- German: 702. Infanterie-Division
- Active: 16 April 1941 – 1945
- Country: Nazi Germany
- Branch: Heer (Wehrmacht)
- Type: Infantry
- Size: Division
- Engagements: German occupation of Norway

The 702nd Infantry Division (German: 702. Infanterie-Division) was an infantry division of the German Heer during World War II.

== Operational history ==
The 702nd Infantry Division was formed on 16 April 1941 as part of the fifteenth Aufstellungswelle in Schwerin in Wehrkreis II (Stettin). Like other divisions of the fifteenth wave, the 702nd only consisted of two instead of the standard three infantry regiments. The formation of the 702nd marked the contribution of Wehrkreis II following an order on 13 April 1941 that demanded each Wehrkreis to raise two regiments, for a total of thirty from the fifteen military districts. It initially consisted of the Infantry Regiments 722 and 742.

The division was sent to occupied Norway in May 1941. Starting in June, it was deployed in northern Norway in the Trondheim area, where it remained for the rest of the war. It performed the duties of a coastal garrison force. For a short while during the year 1942, the 702nd's Infantry Regiment 742 was attached to the 181st Infantry Division. In April 1945, the 702nd Infantry Division was equipped for combat through the addition of a Panzerjäger battalion and the extension of the attached artillery detachment, 662, into the Artillery Regiment 702.

== Noteworthy Individuals ==
- Herbert Lemke, divisional commander starting April 1941.
- Kurt Schmidt, divisional commander starting September 1941.
- Karl Edelmann, divisional commander starting September 1943.
- Juliann Kurzmann, divisional commander starting June 1943 - July 1943.
- Ernst Klepp, divisional commander starting February 1945.
