= Ernst Klepp =

Dr. jur. Ernst Klepp (24 December 1889 – 18 August 1958) was an Austrian infantry general and jurist. He served in the Austro-Hungarian army and in the army of Nazi Germany.

== Life and career ==
Klepp was born in Preßburg, Austria-Hungary (now Bratislava, Slovakia). He attended the Theresian Military Academy and joined the Austro-Hungarian army on 18 August 1910. He fought in World War I as a platoon leader and company commander. After the end of World War I, he served in the Land Command of Styria, the Graz army administrative office and the 10th Alpenjäger Regiment. In 1924, he obtained a Doctor of Law degree (Dr. jur.).

Following the Annexation of Austria by Germany in 1938, he was assigned to the staff of the 45th Infantry Division and later the 18th Infantry Division of the German Heer. He fought in the Eastern Front as commander of the 526th Regiment of the 298th Infantry Division and was awarded an Eastern Medal and a German Cross in Gold. In April 1942, he was promoted to major general and appointed commander of the 370th Infantry Division which he led in the Battle of the Caucasus. For a period of two months, he commanded the 4th Field Division (Luftwaffe) near Vitebsk. In 1944, he was appointed commander of the 133rd Fortress Division in Crete and promoted to lieutenant general. In 1945 he was made commander of the 702nd Infantry Division in Norway.

== Death ==
After Germany surrendered in May 1945, Klepp was captured, held on Island Farm and released in 1947. He died in Graz, Austria, in 1958.
