= Martin Gareis =

- Born: 6 October 1891; Buch near Berlin, Kreis Niederbarnim, Province of Brandenburg, German Empire
- Died: 26 February 1976 (aged 84); Kreuth, Bavaria, West Germany
- Relatives: ∞ 1919 Ilse Rennau; 3 children
- Military career
- Allegiance: German Empire; Weimar Republic; Nazi Germany
- Branch: Prussian Army; Imperial German Army; Reichswehr; Heer (Wehrmacht)
- Service years: 1909–45
- Rank: General der Infanterie
- Commands: 98. Infanterie-Division; 264. Infanterie-Division; XXXXVI. Panzerkorps
- Conflicts: World War I World War II: Poland Campaign; Battle of France; Operation Barbarossa; Battle of Kiev (1941); Battle of Moscow; Battle of Smolensk (1943); Kerch–Eltigen Operation; Vistula–Oder Offensive
- Awards: Knight's Cross of the Iron Cross
- Other work: Author

Martin Siegfried Harald Gareis (6 October 1891 – 26 February 1976) was a German general during World War II who held commands at the divisional, corps and army levels. He was a recipient of the Knight's Cross of the Iron Cross of National Socialist Germany. His oldest son, Leutnant zur See Klaus Gareis (b. 19 April 1922), was KIA on 15 September 1942 when the German submarine U-261, on which he served, was sunk.

== Awards and decorations ==
- Iron Cross (1914), 2nd and 1st Class
  - 2nd Class on 21 October 1914
  - 1st Class on 3 November 1916
- Mecklenburg-Schwerin Merit Cross, 2nd and 1st Class
  - 2nd Class on 9 April 1915
  - 1st Class on 10 August 1917
- Wound Badge (1918) in Black and Silver (Mattweiß)
  - Black on 30 June 1918
  - Silver (upgraded) on 20 January 1931 (in exchange for the badge in black)
- Knight's Cross of the Royal House Order of Hohenzollern with Swords (9 October 1918)
- Honour Cross of the World War 1914/1918 with Swords on 26 January 1935
- Wehrmacht Long Service Award, 4th to 1st Class on 2 October 1936
- Repetition Clasp 1939 to the Iron Cross 1914, 2nd and 1st Class
  - 2nd Class on 18 January 1940
  - 1st Class on 18 June 1940
- Certificate of Recognition of the Commander-in-Chief of the Army on 5 September 1941
- Wound Badge (1939) in Gold on 19 September 1941
- German Cross in Gold on 20 October 1941 as Colonel and Commander of the Infanterie-Regiment 282/98. Infanterie-Division
- Infantry Assault Badge in Silver on 8 April 1942
- Eastern Front Medal on 11 July 1942
- Kuban Shield in September 1943
- Mentioned by name in the Wehrmachtbericht on 16 November 1943
- Knight's Cross of the Iron Cross on 29 November 1943 as Generalleutnant and Commander of the 98. Infanterie-Division
- Order of Michael the Brave, 3rd Class on 12 July 1944 as Generalleutnant and Commander of the 264. Infanterie-Division

=== Wehrmachtbericht reference ===
Date	Original German Wehrmachtbericht wording	Direct English translation
16 November 1943	In den schweren Kämpfen der letzten Wochen haben sich im Kampfgebiet von Kiew die thüringische 7. Panzerdivision unter Führung von Generalmajor von Manteuffel und auf der Krim die fränkisch-sudetendeutsche 98. Infanteriedivision unter Führung von Generalleutnant Gareis besonders ausgezeichnet.	In the heavy fighting of the last few weeks, the Thuringian 7th Panzer Division under the command of Major General von Manteuffel in the combat area of Kiev and the Franconian-Sudeten German 98th Infantry Division under the command of Lieutenant General Gareis in the Crimea have distinguished themselves particularly.

Military offices
Preceded by Generalleutnant Erich Schröck	Commander of 98. Infanterie-Division; 31 December 1941 - 1 February 1944	Succeeded by Generalleutnant Alfred-Hermann Reinhardt
Preceded by Generalleutnant Otto-Joachim Lüdecke	Commander of 264. Infanterie-Division; 15 May 1944 - 25 September 1944	Succeeded by Generalmajor Paul Hermann
Preceded by General der Panzertruppe Walter Fries	Commander of XXXXVI. Panzerkorps; 19 January 1945 - 2 May 1945	Succeeded by none
