= Lyenina, Mogilev region =

Village in Belarus

Coordinates: 54.4114°N 31.1228°E

Lyenina or Lenino (Belarusian: Леніна, romanized: Lienina; Russian: Ленино) is an agrotown in Horki District, Mogilev Region, Belarus.

During World War II, the 1943 Battle of Lenino took place near the settlement.

== History ==
Historically until 1918 the village had been known as Romanovo (Belarusian: Рама́наў, Ramanaw). Since the Truce of Andrusovo of 1697 it was part of the Polish–Lithuanian Commonwealth and was located not far from the Polish-Muscovite border. Administratively part of the Mścisław Voivodeship, it was a private property of the mighty Radziwiłł family. Its last owner before the partitions of Poland was Karol Stanisław "Panie Kochanku" Radziwiłł. However, as he declined to sign an oath of loyalty to empress Catherine II of Russia, the village was confiscated and donated to a Russian family of Dondukov-Korsakov in 1774. At that time the group of villages consisted of 72 settlements with 8589 houses. In late 19th century the village itself had 700 inhabitants, roughly half of them Jews.

In late July 1941, all the Jews of the village and from the surrounding area were resettled into a ghetto. Local police guarded the ghetto, which was surrounded by barbed wire on one side and enclosed by a river and a swamp on the other. On June 12, 1942, the Germans and local police shot all of them in pits that had been prepared 2 kilometers to the East of the village.

On October 12, 1943, a major battle took place to the north of the village, later to be known by the name of battle of Lenino, even though the village itself was not targeted by any of the sides.

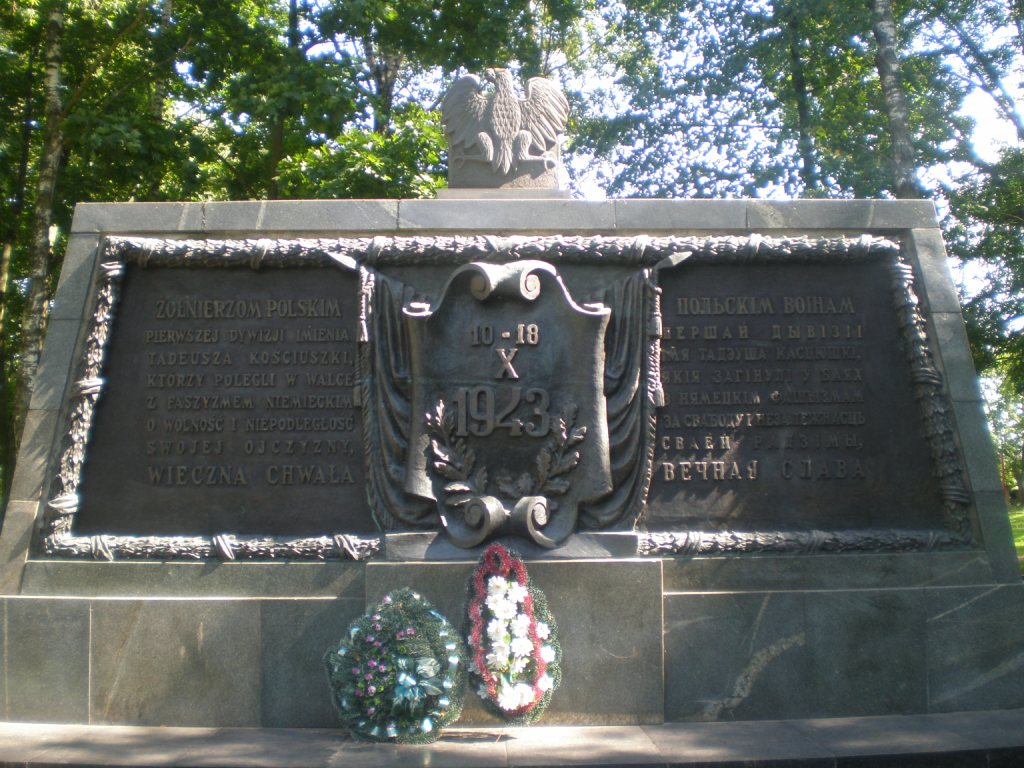
Monument to the fallen Polish soldiers of the Battle of Lenino

In 1968 a Polish-Soviet Brotherhood Memorial was opened in the village, marking the battlefield. In 1989 a Polish War Cemetery was created.

On the edge of the battlefield, there is a museum containing artefacts from the time and also a panorama of the battle.
