= 8th Panzer Division =

German army division during World War II

- 8. Panzer-Division; — 8. PzDiv — XX
- Unit insignia
- Active: 1939–45
- Country: Nazi Germany
- Branch: German Army
- Type: Panzer
- Role: Armoured warfare
- Size: Division
- Garrison/HQ: Wehrkreis III: Cottbus
- Engagements: World War II; Battle of France; Balkans campaign; Baltic operation; Siege of Leningrad

Insignia
- Insignia (1940)

The 8th Panzer Division was a formation of the Wehrmacht Heer. The division was formed by reorganising the 3rd Light Division in October 1939. It was transferred to the west and fought in the Battle of France, in May 1940, and the German invasion of the Balkans in April 1941. Soon after the division advanced towards Leningrad under Army Group North in Operation Barbarossa, and would remain on the eastern front for the remainder of the war. Staying on defensive fronts, it saw action in the relief of Kholm in 1942, Orel and the withdrawals of Army Group Centre in 1943, until transferred to Army group South. The division then fought in a series of retrograde movements, back through Ukraine, into Hungary and finally into Silesia and surrender in May 1945.

During its existence, the division was headquartered in Cottbus, in the German military district Wehrkreis III.

== Organization ==
In 1938, the 3rd Light Division was formed, consisting of the 67th Panzer Battalion, and the 8th and 9th Mechanized Cavalry Regiments as well as the 8th Reconnaissance Regiment. The 3rd Light Division was sent to participate in the 1939 Invasion of Poland, after which it was converted to the 8th Panzer Division in the winter of 1939.

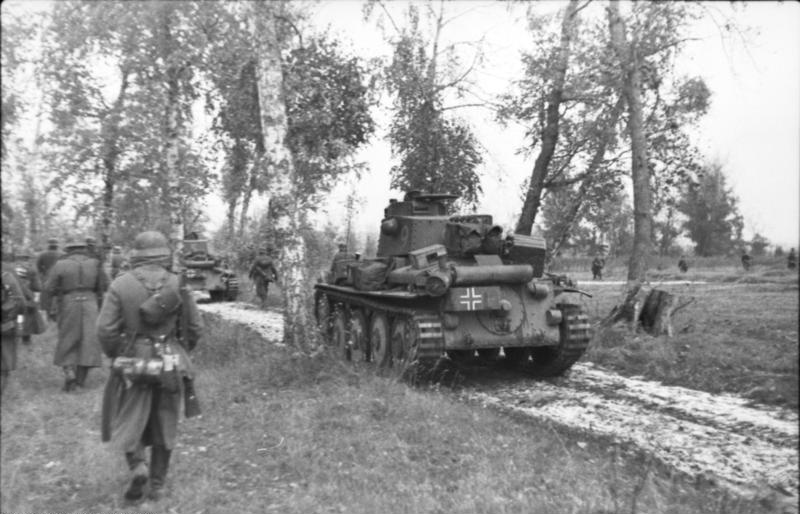
1941, a 38(t) deployed in Operation Barbarossa

As part of the reorganization its reconnaissance regiment of two battalions was split, one going to the 10th Panzer Division and the other staying with the 8th Panzer Division. The two battalions comprising the 10th Panzer Regiment from East Prussian were added, as was the 8th Rifle Brigade, which now controlled the 8th Rifle Regiment of three battalions and the 8th Motorcycle Battalion. The panzer battalions were equipped primarily with Czech tanks and Mk II light tanks, leaving the 8th Panzer Division with a total of 212 tanks (58 Mk II, 118 38t, 23 Mk IV, & 15 command tanks) in its organization for the attack into France.

The division also contained an anti-tank battalion of initially only two companies, equipped with the ubiquitous, but seriously underpowered 37 mm PAK 35/36, a pioneer battalion, signals and support units. The divisional artillery was supplied by two battalions of 105 mm howitzers.

By February 1941 the division was organised as follows:

- 8th Rifle Brigade. (HQ commanding the infantry regiments)
- 8th Rifle Regiment (I, II, battalions)
- 28th Rifle Regiment (I, II, battalions)
- 8th Motorcycle Battalions
- 10th Panzer Regiment (I, II, III battalions)
- 80th Artillery Regiment (I, II, III battalions)
- 43rd Panzerjäger Battalion
- 59th Reconnaissance Battalion
- 59th Pioneer Battalion
- 84th Signals Battalion
- 59th Division Support Units

The 67th Panzer Battalion had been incorporated into the 10th Panzer regiment as 3rd Battalion, the infantry was now organised under two Regiments of two battalions of motorised infantry each. The Artillery Regiment had gained another battalion of heavy Guns from the 645th Heavy Artillery Battalion.

== History ==
It was made a part of XLI Motorized Corps for the Battle of France. In the battles of the Meuse Crossings, French forces were initially able to repel German attacks. Eventually, however, the French were forced to retreat in the face of an overwhelming assault by German tanks. The division was involved in the destruction of the 1st and the 7th Armies in May 1940, and remained on the line in France until the country's conquest in June 1940.

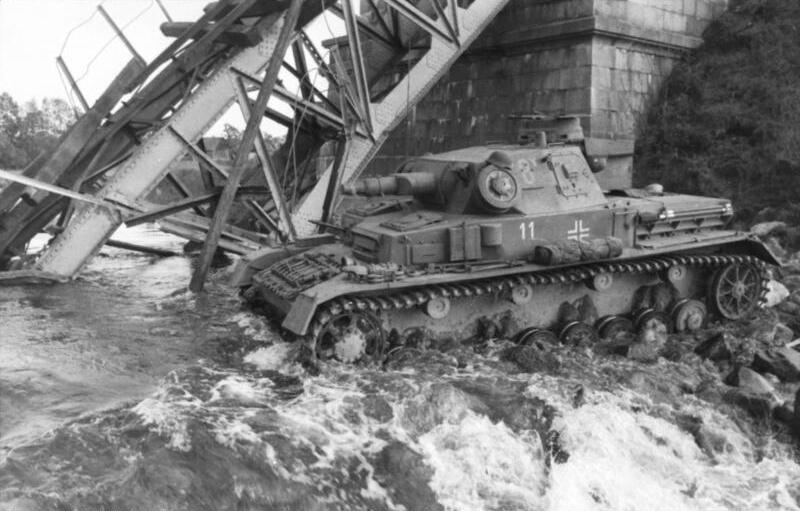
June 1941 a Panzer IV of 8th Panzer Division crossing a river in the Soviet Union

At the start of Operation Barbarossa, the 8th Panzer Division was assigned to Erich von Mansteins' LVI Panzer Corps, part of Panzer Group 4, which was tasked with the main drive through the Baltic states in the direction of Leningrad, Soviet Union's second largest city.

Attacking in the pre dawn hours of 22 June 1941, the division soon found a gap in the Soviet border defences and by nightfall had penetrated to a distance of 70 km. Driven by the division commander to maintain a rapid pace, and switching focus between its battle groups to find the path of least resistance, the division reached the Dvina river, on the morning of the 4th day. Its combat engineers, with the assistance of a company of Brandenburgers, mounted a ruse and managed to capture both the rail and road bridge intact.

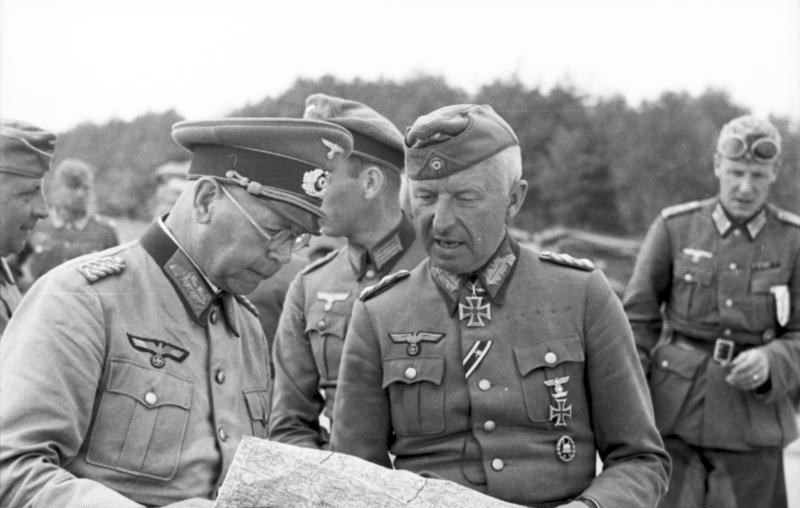
Erich Branderberger (left), divisional commander of the 8th Panzer at the time of Operation Barbarossa, in conversation with von Manstein 21 June 1941

Soon the 8th Panzer Division had tanks and infantry across the river, but was forced to halt and wait for resupply and the other Panzer corps of Panzer Group 4 to catch up. The following days were spent gradually expanding its bridgehead whilst fending off Soviet counterattacks from the Soviet 21 Mechanised Corps.

Resumed a rapid advance to the east against a Soviet forces now in complete disarray.

On 7 October it began to snow in the Army Group North area, and by 15 October the snow was ankle deep. General Leeb completed his regrouping for the continued attack across the Volkhov river towards Tikhvin. The infantry formed bridgeheads from which 8th Panzer and the other mobile units of XXXIX attacked on 19 October. However progress was agonisingly slow, the muddy roads almost impassable to any but tracked vehicles, and the Army was having difficulties bringing in supplies behind the troops. The Corps finally reached and captured Tikhvin on 11 November, leaving a 100 kilometre flank weakly covered by the 8th Panzer. The freezing weather meant that the roads improved slightly, which helped the transport of supplies, but not the troops who, still lacking winter clothing, suffered greatly from the conditions.

Eventually nearly the entire division was united in the Kholm relief attempt, and after its successful relief, defended a very loose, but wide sector just to the south of Kholm, in the bogs and marches stretching down towards the Army group boundary. Here the division remained for most of 1942 until it was transferred to Army Group Centre, in the winter of 1942.

After the winter fighting of 1941, the incursions by the 3rd and 4th Soviet Shock armies between Army Groups North and Centre, had stretched the front to such an extent that the Germans could not occupy a single line, but resorted to isolated strong points instead. This defence stance, although necessary left them vulnerable to penetration, and in xx 1942 the Soviet exploited their weakness and encircled substantial forces in the city of Velikiye Luki. Hitler forbade a break out attempt by the troops and declared the city a fortress General Chevallerie, who had defended the area since the winter battles, determined to accomplish what the Wehrmacht had pulled off twice the previous winter, at Demyansk and Kholm, which was to have the encircled troops supplied by air and mount a successful relief operation. The 8th Panzer Division would become a main component of the relief attempt, and was in place by 1 December.

After an initial surge the division attack bogged down against fierce Soviet resistance. The relief forces continued to inch forward but progress was slow and costly, and by 13 December 1942 the 8th Panzer Division has suffered 1473 casualties including 82 officers. Two days later the divisions' drive was virtually stopped. The main weight of the relief was now with group W to the south, but its attacking units had similarly suffered highly and unit strengths were plummeting. The attack was kept going for the sake of the encircled troops but it was obvious to General Kurt von der Chevallerie that without additional forces it would not succeed.

At the start of January 1943, Army Group Centre assigned two additional divisions plus another panzer battalion for a renewed push towards the city. The 8th Panzer participated in the renewed offensive, but although the relief forces got to with in 4 km of the encirclement, they were only able to assist small groups to break out. thousands of wounded and stragglers were taken prisoner as the Soviet forces squeezed the garrison out of existence.

The 8th Panzer Division took up defensive positions north of the Ukrainian capital, but failed to prevent the Soviet armies break through, and was pushed back until Manstein, now commander of Army Group South orchestrated a counter stroke at Zhitomir temporarily stabilising the front. However the reprieve did not last and renewed Soviet thrusts forced the 4th Panzer Army and the 8th Panzer Division with it, back towards the Polish frontier.

On 10 November 1943, the division, already heavily depleted, suffered additional casualties at Zhytomyr, temporarily leaving it with zero operational tanks. On 20 November, 8th Panzer Division possessed 66 tanks, of which only 7 were operational.

On 12 July 1944 the Soviet 1st Ukrainian Front launched a massive offensive in the direction of Lvov (the Lvov–Sandomierz Offensive). The front had over 800,000 men, 13,000 guns and mortars and 200 tanks, attacking with 2 main groupings, both rapidly broke through the German defenses and by the 6th day of the operation had trapped several units in a pocket under XIII Army Corps command, including elements of 8th Panzer Division. The 8th Panzer Division had been in reserve rebuilding near Brody, and was immediately committed to the breakthrough area but failed to stop the Soviet advance. On 20 the division mounted a failed relief attempt but was compelled to retreat. The trapped forces managed to break the ring around them but had to filter their way through the attacking Red Army formation and only a part of their numbers and without any vehicles or heavy weapons.

The division continued to resist the Soviet advances fighting in Hungary in the winter battles around Budapest and then transferred to Silesia, where it battled on until finally surrendering to Soviet forces near Prague.

== Commanding officers ==
The commanders of the division:

- General der Panzertruppe Adolf-Friedrich Kuntzen, 16 October 1939 – 20 February 1941
- General der Panzertruppe Erich Brandenberger, 20–21 February 1941
- Generalleutnant Walter Neumann-Silkow, 21 February 1941 – 26 May 1941
- General der Panzertruppe Erich Brandenberger, 26 May – 8 December 1941
- Generalleutnant Werner Hühner, 8 December 1941 – 28 January 1942
- General der Panzertruppe Erich Brandenberger, 29 January 1942 – 6 August 1942
- Generalleutnant Josef Schrötter, 6 August 1942 – 10 November 1942
- General der Panzertruppe Erich Brandenberger, 10 November 1942 – 17 January 1943
- Generalleutnant Sebastian Fichtner, 17 January 1943 – 20 September 1943
- Generalmajor Gottfried Fröhlich, 20 September 1943 – 1 April 1944
- Generalmajor Werner Friebe, 1 April 1944 – 21 July 1944
- Generalmajor Gottfried Fröhlich, 21 July 1944 – 5 January 1945
- Generalmajor Heinrich-Georg Hax, 5 January – 8 May 1945

== Sources ==
- Mitcham, Samuel W. (2006). The Panzer Legions: A Guide to the German Army Tank Divisions of World War II and Their Commanders. Stackpole Books. ISBN 978-0-8117-3353-3.
- Mitcham, Samuel W. (2007). German Order of Battle Volume Three: Panzer, Panzer Grenadier, and Waffen SS Divisions in WWII. Stackpole Books. ISBN 978-0-8117-3438-7.
- Nafziger, George (1994), German Army – 1 September 1939 (PDF), Combined Arms Research Library Digital Library, archived from the original (PDF) on 8 December 2011
- Nafziger, George F. (2000). The German order of battle infantry in World War II. Mechanicsburg: Greenhill Books. ISBN 978-1-85367-393-1.
