= 98th Infantry Division (Wehrmacht) =

- 98. Infanterie-Division
- Active: 18 September 1939 – 8 May 1945
- Country: Nazi Germany
- Branch: Army
- Type: Infantry
- Size: Division
- Engagements: World War II

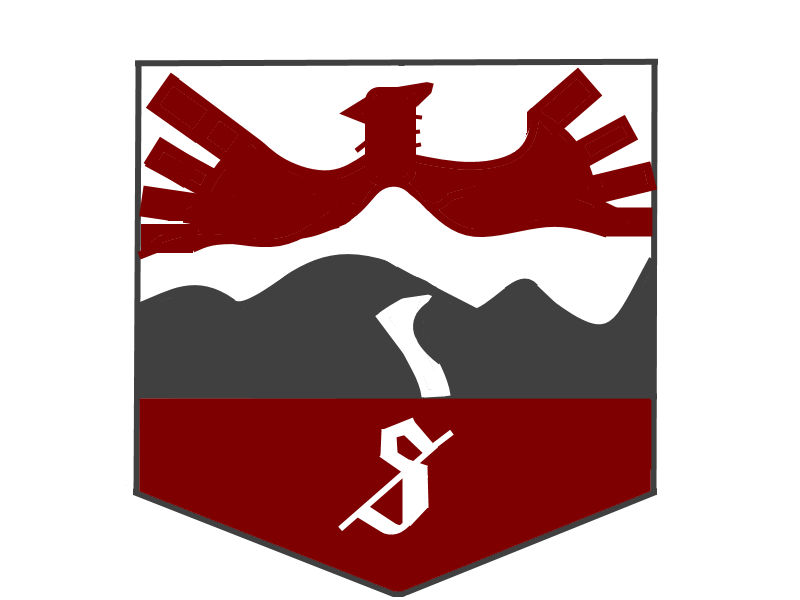
98th Infantry Division vehicle insignia.

The 98th Infantry Division (German: 98. Infanterie-Division) was created on 18 September 1939 in Grafenwöhr. It was destroyed on the Crimea in May 1944 and reformed on 5 June 1944.

== Commanding officers ==
- Generalleutnant Erich Schröck, 1 September 1939 – 11 April 1940
- Generalleutnant Herbert Stimmel, 11 April 1940 – 10 June 1940
- Generalleutnant Erich Schröck, 10 June 1940 – 31 December 1941
- General der Infanterie Martin Gareis, 31 December 1941 – 1 February 1944
- Generalleutnant Alfred-Hermann Reinhardt, 1 February 1944 – 11 April 1945
- Generalmajor Otto Schiel, 11 April 1945 – 8 May 1945

== Bibliography ==
- Tessin, Georg (1972). Verbände und Truppen der deutschen Wehrmacht und Waffen–SS im Zweiten Weltkrieg 1939–1945 [Units and Troops of the German Military and Waffen-SS in the Second World War 1939–1945] (in German). Vol. 6: Die Landstreitkräfte 71–130 (Units 71–130). Osnabrück: Biblio. ISBN 3-7648-0872-1.
