= Helmut Friebe =

German General and Knight's Cross recipient (1894–1970)

- Born: 4 November 1894
- Died: 14 January 1970 (aged 75)
- Relatives: Werner Friebe
- Military career
- Allegiance: German Empire; Weimar Republic; Nazi Germany
- Branch: German Army
- Service years: 1914–1945
- Rank: Generalleutnant
- Commands: 125th Infantry Division; 22nd Air Landing Division; LXIV Army Corps
- Conflicts: World War I; World War II; Invasion of Poland; Battle of Belgium; Battle of France; Operation Barbarossa; Battle of the Caucasus; Kerch–Eltigen Operation
- Awards: Knight's Cross of the Iron Cross

Helmut Friebe (4 November 1894 – 14 January 1970) was a German general in the Wehrmacht of Nazi Germany during World War II who commanded the LXIV Army Corps. He was a recipient of the Knight's Cross of the Iron Cross. He took up his command in Crete in May 1944 after the kidnapping of General Kreipe by Patrick Leigh Fermor and Bill Stanley Moss working with Cretan andartes.

== Awards and decorations ==
- Knight's Cross of the Iron Cross on 13 August 1941 as Oberst and commander of Infanterie-Regiment 164

Military offices
| Preceded by General der Infanterie Wilhelm Schneckenburger | Commander of 125. Infanterie-Division; 24 December 1942 – 31 March 1944 | Succeeded by none |
| Preceded by Generalmajor Heinrich Kreipe | Commander of 22. Infanterie-Division (Luftlande); 1 May 1944 – 4 April 1945 | Succeeded by Generalmajor Gerhard Kühne |
| Preceded by General der Artillerie Maximilian Grimmeiß | Commander of LXIV. Armeekorps; 15 April 1945 – April 1945 | Succeeded by General der Artillerie Rudolf Freiherr von Roman |
