= Gottfried Frölich =

German general

- Born: 3 June 1894; Dresden
- Died: 30 July 1959 (aged 65); Heidenheim
- Military career
- Allegiance: German Empire (to 1918); Weimar Republic (to 1933); Nazi Germany
- Branch: German Army
- Service years: 1914–1945
- Rank: Generalmajor
- Commands: 36th Infantry Division; 8th Panzer Division
- Conflicts: World War I World War II
- Awards: Knight's Cross of the Iron Cross

Gottfried Frölich (3 June 1894 – 30 July 1959) was a German general in the Wehrmacht during World War II, having served on the Western Front during World War I. A recipient of the Knight's Cross of the Iron Cross, he briefly commanded the 36th Infantry Division and then later led the 8th Panzer Division. He was relieved of his command for its performance during battles in Hungary in early 1945. He surrendered to British forces in May 1945 and was released three years later. He died in 1959.

== Biography ==
Born in Dresden on 3 June 1894, Frölich joined the army of Imperial Germany in 1914, upon the outbreak of World War I, as a Fahnenjunker (officer cadet). Posted to the Wuerttemberger 49th Field Artillery Regiment, he was commissioned a leutnant (second lieutenant) the following year. His regiment was attached to the 27th Infantry Division which was serving on the Western Front as part of the XIII (Royal Württemberg) Corps. He was wounded in May 1916 while participating in the corps' offensive in the Ypres Salient. After recovering from his wounds, he was posted to his regiment's I. Battalion as its adjutant. He continued to serve on the Western Front for the remainder of the war, seeing action in the areas around the Somme, Cambrai and Flanders.

Frölich was retained in the postwar Reichswehr (Imperial Defence) and served initially with the 12th Artillery Regiment. He then held a series of battalion posts, none of which were in the artillery, and by 1929 was the adjutant of the 4th Transportation Battalion. He was then placed on the staff of the 4th Artillery Regiment and from 1931 to 1934 was a battery commander. By 1938, he was a Oberstleutnant (lieutenant colonel) commanding the II. Battalion, 76th Panzer Artillery Regiment. His regiment was attached to the 1st Light Division during the Invasion of Poland.

=== World War II ===
After serving in Poland, the 1st Light Division returned to Germany, where it began converting to a Panzer division. However, shortly after this process began, Frölich was appointed the commander of the 78th Panzer Artillery Regiment, which was part of the 7th Panzer Division, led by Generalmajor (Note: Although translating to major general, in the Wehrmacht, the rank of generalmajor was actually equivalent that of a brigadier general in the United States Army.) Erwin Rommel. He remained in command of the regiment throughout the Battle of France and then in Operation Barbarossa, where it was particularly effective in supporting the division as it advanced towards Moscow. Apart from a period in France while the division was resting after being heavily involved in the offensive mounted by the Soviet Army over the winter of 1941–42, Frölich served on the Eastern Front until after the Battle of Kursk in July 1943. He was then given command of the 36th Infantry Division, which he led for only a few weeks before appointed commander of 8th Panzer Division in late September. His new command was then serving on the Eastern Front and would be in extensive action for several months. In December 1943, he was awarded the Knight's Cross of the Iron Cross and promoted to generalmajor.

In March 1944, Frölich became sick and ceded command of the 8th Panzer Division to a former staff officer, Oberst Werner Friebe. However, Freibe proved to be an inadequate commander at divisional level and performed poorly in operations mounted in early July to rescue the XIII Corps, encircled by Soviet forces. The day after several regimental commanders of the division did not follow orders to advance, Frölich returned to his former command. He restored some order and launched an attack to relieve the XIII Corps but this failed and it was largely lost to the Soviets. Over 2,000 personnel of the division were casualties but it remained on the front lines. He led it adequately in the fighting retreat into Hungary, where the division destroyed the 34th Guards Rifle Division in early 1945. However, when sent to the Hungarian city of Komárom, in which there were oil refineries still supplying the Nazi war effort, Frölich was unable to prevent the Soviet advance. It was only the intervention of German reinforcements that secured Komárom. For his failure, Frölich was relieved of his command.

Frölich, in mid-March 1945, took over command of the Korpsgruppe von Tettau (Corps Group von Tettau). This was an ad-hoc formation largely made up of Volkssturm and training units. Expected to defend two key cities in Pomerania along the Baltic Coast, he could do little to prevent their capture by the Soviets. The following month he was named Harko (Higher Artillery Commander) of the 3rd Panzer Army by General der Panzertruppe (Note: Translating to "General of Panzer Troops", this rank is equivalent to that of a lieutenant general in the United States Army.) Hasso von Manteuffel, with whom he had served during his time with the 7th Panzer Division. When the 3rd Panzer Army moved west in May 1945, it, and Frölich, surrendered to British forces. He was released in May 1948 and lived in Meisenheim. He died in Heidenheim on 30 July 1959.

== Notes ==
Footnotes

Citations

Military offices
Preceded by Generalleutnant Rudolf Stegmann	Commander of 36th Infantry Division; 10 August 1943 - 20 September 1943	Succeeded by Generalleutnant Rudolf Stegmann
Preceded by Generalleutnant Sebastian Fichtner	Commander of 8th Panzer Division; 20 September 1943 – 1 April 1944	Succeeded by Generalmajor Werner Friebe
Preceded by Generalmajor Werner Friebe	Commander of 8th Panzer Division; 21 July 1944 – 5 January 1945	Succeeded by Generalmajor Heinrich-Georg Hax
