= 370th Infantry Division =

370th Infantry Division: 370. Infanterie-Division
- Active: 17 February 1942– 9 October 1944
- Country: Nazi Germany
- Branch: Heer (Wehrmacht)
- Type: Infantry
- Size: Division
- Engagements: World War II: Battle of the Caucasus; Kuban bridgehead; Second Jassy–Kishinev Offensive

Commanders
- Notable commanders: Fritz Becker

The 370th Infantry Division, (German: 370. Infanterie-Division) was an infantry division of the German Army during World War II, active from 1942 to 1944.

== History ==
The 370th ID was formed on February 17, 1942 in Reims, France as part of the 19th wave of infantry divisions formed during the war.

After the division had carried out security tasks in northern France, it was transferred to the southern section of the Eastern Front in June 1942 and joined the 17th Army in Army Group South. After being deployed at the Mius River, the 370 ID marched over Rostov-on-Don together with the 1st Panzer Army into the Caucasus. In January 1943, the 370th Infantry Division participated in the defense of the Kuban bridgehead. From autumn 1943 to March 1944 the division was in action near Cherson and Mykolaiv with the 6th Army. In December 1943 it was reorganized into a new type 44 division.

The 370th Infantry Division was destroyed in Romania together with the Army Group South Ukraine in August 1944 during the Second Jassy–Kishinev Offensive, and disbanded as a unit on October 9, 1944. Survivors were integrated into the 76th ID and 15th Infantry Divisions.

== Commanding officers ==
- Generalleutnant Ernst Klepp: 1 April 1942 - 15 September 1942
- Generalleutnant Fritz Becker: 15 September - 15 December 1942
- Generalleutnant Erich von Bogen: 15 December 1942 - 20 January 1943
- Generalleutnant Fritz Becker: 20 January - 1 May 1943
- Generalleutnant Hermann Böhme: 1 May - 7 September 1943
- Generalleutnant Fritz Becker: 7 September 1943 - 1 June 1944
- Generalleutnant Botho Graf von Hülsen: 1 June - 3 September 1944 (POW)

== Sources ==
- Lexikon der Wehrmacht
- Axis History
