= 36th Infantry Division (Wehrmacht) =

- Active: October 1936 – May 1945
- Country: Nazi Germany
- Branch: Army
- Type: Panzergrenadier
- Role: Maneuver warfare Raiding
- Size: Division
- Engagements: World War II: Battle of France; Eastern Front

Commanders
- Notable commanders: Egon von Neindorff

The 36th Infantry Division was a German infantry formation of World War II. It was formed in Kaiserslautern on 1 October 1936. During World War II it was mobilized in August 1939, as part of the first wave. It was later reorganized and re-designated the 36th Infantry Division (mot) in November 1940. It was then de-motorized, reorganized and re-designated the 36th Infantry Division on 1 May 1943. The division was destroyed at Bobruysk in June 1944 during the Soviet Operation Bagration. It was reformed on 3 August 1944 as the 36th Grenadier Division and renamed the 36th Volksgrenadier Division in October 1944.

== Operational history ==
The division was formed in October 1936 with men from Kaiserslautern, and consisted largely of Bavarian Palatinates.

=== France ===
During the German invasion of France the 36th Infantry Division was part of Army Group A's 16th Army, where it served with VII Corps. Crossing into France through the Chiers, the corps' objective was a commune by the name of La Ferté. The 70th Infantry Regiment was transferred to the 111th Infantry Division during this stay.

=== Eastern Front ===
The division took part in Operation Barbarossa as part of XXXXI Panzer Corps, itself attached to Army Group North. In late October the division helped establish a bridgehead near Kalinin, which it did so while under heavy Soviet fire. In December 1941, the division had reached just west of Klin when it came under fire from the Soviets' 365th Rifle Division. The Soviet division was forced to retreat after German forces began flanking them from the east. During the winter the division took heavy casualties. In Summer 1942 the division fought at Rzhev and Baranovo, taking heavy casualties.

The division was de-motorized in May 1943, though retained more motorized vehicles than other Infantry Divisions. In July 1943, during the Battle of Kursk, the division was part of the XXXXVII Panzer Corps, a reserve unit for the 9th Army just south of Oryol. With Soviet forces slowing down Walter Model's advance, the division was put on active duty on 6 July. On the 12th, Field Marshal Günther von Kluge ordered the division to retreat from Oryol to rejoin the 9th Army as the Soviets began to storm into the city outskirts. Changing his mind, he sent it back north with the 12 Panzer Divisions arrived in their full nearly four hours later.

In the summer of 1944, as the Red Army launched Operation Bagration, the division was at only the size of two regiments. The addition of a third regimental-sized battlegroup made up of remnants of other units did not help to build morale. It was here that the division's commanding officer, Generalmajor Conrady, was captured. The division was largely destroyed.

=== Return to France ===
Replenished and reformed as the 36th Volksgrenadier Division, and containing the remnants of the 268th Infantry Division, the unit was sent westwards in September 1944 to counter Allied advance into France; Luxembourg and the Saarland, though remained in reserve until 10 September, when it was given to the 1st Army at the Moselle. With the army pulling back to the Franco-German border, by November the division had worn itself out in the two months of fighting. The division was part of the January 1945 Operation Nordwind, where it served as part of the XIII SS Infantry Corps under Obergruppenführer-SS Max Simon. By now the division was reduced to the size of a single regiment, though its morale remained stable.

On 28 March, the division formed part of the 7th Army's left wing as LXXXII Corps, which was now resisting American General George S. Patton's 3rd Army in central Germany.

== Commanders ==
- Colonel General Georg Lindemann (1 September 1939 – 25 October 1940)
- Lieutenant General Otto-Ernst Ottenbacher (25 October 1940 – 15 October 1941)
- General of the Infantry Hans Gollnick (15 October 1941 – 1 August 1943)
- Lieutenant General Rudolf Stegmann (1 August 1943 – 10 August 1943)
- Major General Gottfried Fröhlich (10 August 1943 – 20 September 1943)
- Lieutenant General Rudolf Stegmann (20 September 1943 – 1 January 1944)
- Major General Horst Kadgien (1 January 1944 – 17 January 1944)
- Lieutenant General Egon von Neindorff (17 January 1944 – 19 January 1944)
- Major General Alexander Conrady (19 January 1944 – 1 July 1944)
- Major General August Wellm (1 August 1944 – 9 October 1944)

=== 36th Volksgrenadier Division ===
- Major General August Wellm (October 1944 - March 1945)
- Major General Helmut Kleikamp (March - May 1945)

== Area of operations ==
- West wall (September 1939 – May 1940)
- France (May 1940 – June 1941)
- Eastern front, northern sector (June 1941 – July 1942)
- Eastern front, central sector (July 1942 – June 1943)
- Eastern front (June 1943 – July 1944)
- France (August 1944 – January 1945)
- Southern Germany (January 1945 – May 1945)

== Order of battle ==
1939

- 70th Infantry Regiment
- 87th Infantry Regiment
- 118th Infantry Regiment
- 36th Reconnaissance detachment
- 36th Artillery Regiment
- Beobachtungs-Abteilung 36 (3)
- 36th Pioneer Battalion
- 36th Anti-tank detachment
- 36th Signal Battalion
- 36th Field-replacement Battalion
- Divisional supply unit

1940

- 87th Infantry Regiment (mot)
- 118th Infantry Regiment (mot)

1943

- 87th Grenadier Regiment
- 118th Grenadier Regiment
- Division group 268
- 36th Reconnaissance detachment
- 268th Artillery Regiment
- 36th Pioneer Battalion
- 36th Anti-tank Battalion
- 36th Signal Battalion
- 36th Field-replacement Battalion
- Divisional supply unit

1944

- 87th Grenadier Regiment
- 118th Grenadier Regiment
- 165th Grenadier Regiment
- 268th Artillerie-Regiment
- 36th Fusileer Company
- 36th FLaK Company
- 1036th Assault-gun detachment
- 36th Messaging Company
- 36th Pioneer Company
- 36th Supply Regiment
