= 125th Infantry Division (Wehrmacht) =

- German: 125. Infanterie-Division
- Division insignia
- Active: October 1940 – March 1944
- Country: Nazi Germany
- Branch: Army
- Type: Infantry
- Size: Division
- Garrison/HQ: Münsingen
- Nickname: "Weasel Division"
- Engagements: World War II: Eastern Front; Battle of Uman; Battle of Kiev (1941); Battle of Rostov (1942)

Commanders
- 1940–1942: Wilhelm Schneckenburger
- 1942–1944: Helmut Friebe

The 125th Infantry Division (German: 125. Infanterie-Division) was an infantry division of the Heer, the army of Nazi Germany, in World War II.

== History ==
The 125th Infantry Division was raised on October 5, 1940 as part of the 11th deployment wave, in October 1940, where it remained in Münsingen until April 1941, when it was moved to the Balkans as part of the 2nd Army's 52nd Corps in preparation for Operation Barbarossa, the invasion of the Soviet Union. The following June, the Army attacked through the Ukrainian SSR.

=== Barbarossa ===
Moving to the front from Austria, where the division was registered with Höheres Kommando XXXIV, it was now organized into the 17th Army, part of Army Group South. For the remainder of the year the 125th Division stayed with Army Group South in Ukraine, assisting in both the battles at Uman and Kiev.

=== Case Blue ===
In July 1942 the division returned to the 17th Army from the 1st Panzer Army, now as Army Group A's 5th Corps, as it began an assault on the Black Sea city of Novorossiysk. Moving into the Caucasus, the division, along with the 3rd Romanian Army, served under Colonel-General Richard Ruoff in "Army Group Ruoff". Outside Rostov, Ruoff's forces were joined by the 5th SS-Panzer Regiment. Quickly eliminating the Soviets in Rostov, the division made its way into the outskirts of Krasnodar, some 300 kilometers away, in just over two weeks. Pushed back in the winter again, the division retreated to Ukraine.

=== Capitulation ===
Throughout the majority of 1943, the 125th remained along the Caucasian city Novorossiysk with the 17th Army before being transferred to Kuban in May. Despite some successes in Kuban with the Romanian units, the 125th was pulled back into the Lower Dnieper Sector. By October, 1943, the division was under heavy fire from Soviet forces in the Crimea, evident by five Tiger tanks being sent to their assistance on 2 October, and a group of the 653rd Heavy Tank Destroyer Battalion's Elefants a week later. Pulled back to Nikopol in Ukraine with the 6th Army, the division came under further fire, eventually losing its distinction as a division, referred to instead as "divisiongruppe 125".

=== Aftermath ===
The remnants of the 125th were incorporated into the 302nd Infantry Division, becoming part of the 420th Grenadier Regiment, which only lasted until August, when the division met its own end in Romania. Lieutenant General Friebe, on the other hand, was moved over to the 22nd Air Landing Division, where it was crushed by Titoist partisans in Yugoslavia.
