= Fritz Becker (general) =

German general (1892–1967)

- Born: 7 March 1892; Heidberg, Regierungsbezirk Köln, Rhine Province, Kingdom of Prussia, German Empire
- Died: 11 June 1967 (aged 75); Herzberg, Lower Saxony, West Germany
- Relatives: ∞ 1927 Hilde Koch; 2 children
- Military career
- Allegiance: Prussia; German Empire; Weimar Republic; Nazi Germany
- Branch: Prussian Army; Imperial German Army; Reichsheer; German Army
- Service years: 1913–1945
- Rank: Generalleutnant
- Unit: 7th Rhenish Infantry Regiment No. 69
- Commands: 370. Infanterie-Division; 389. Infanterie-Division; XXIV Panzerkorps; XLVI. Panzerkorps
- Conflicts: World War I World War II: Battle of France; Balkan Campaign; Operation Barbarossa; Battle of the Caucasus; Courland Pocket
- Awards: Knight's Cross of the Iron Cross

Fritz Becker (7 March 1892 – 11 June 1967) was a general in the Wehrmacht of Nazi Germany during World War II who held commands at divisional and corps levels. He was a recipient of the Knight's Cross of the Iron Cross.

== Promotions ==
- 29 January 1913 Fahnenjunker (Officer Candidate)
- 16 June 1913 Fahnenjunker-Unteroffizier (Officer Candidate with Corporal/NCO/Junior Sergeant rank)
- 18 October 1913 Fähnrich (Officer Cadet)
- 20 May 1914 Leutnant (2nd Lieutenant) with Patent from 24 May 1912
- 18 June 1917 Oberleutnant (1st Lieutenant)
  - 1 July 1922 received Reichswehr Rank Seniority (RDA) from 18 June 1917 (11)
- 1 March 1925 Hauptmann (Captain) (5)
- 1 April 1934 Major (41)
- 2 August 1936 Oberstleutnant (Lieutenant Colonel) with effect and RDA from 1 August 1936 (56)
- 31 March 1939 Oberst (Colonel) with effect and RDA from 1 April 1939 (27)
- 20 April 1942 Generalmajor (Major General) with effect and RDA from 1 April 1942 (32b)
- 20 April 1943 Generalleutnant (Lieutenant General) with effect and RDA from 1 April 1943 (7a)

== Awards and decorations ==
- Iron Cross (1914), 2nd and 1st Class
  - 2nd Class in September 1914
  - 1st Class on 29 October 1916
- Wound Badge (1918) in Black
- Honour Cross of the World War 1914/1918 with Swords on 13 December 1934
- Wehrmacht Long Service Award, 4th to 1st Class
  - 2nd Class on 2 October 1936
  - 1st Class on 29 January 1938
- West Wall Medal on 28 February 1940
- Repetition Clasp 1939 to the Iron Cross 1914, 2nd and 1st Class
  - 2nd Class on 22/25 May 1940
  - 1st Class on 3 June 1940
- Infantry Assault Badge in Bronze on 24 November 1941
- Winter Battle in the East 1941–42 Medal on 3 September 1942
- Kuban Shield on 1 August 1944
- German Cross in Gold on 22 November 1941 as Oberst and Commander of the Infanterie-Regiment 60 (motorized)
- Knight's Cross of the Iron Cross on 6 April 1943 as Generalmajor and Commander of the 370. Infanterie-Division

== Sources ==
- German Federal Archives: BArch PERS 6/434 and PERS 6/299382
