= Wilhelm Schneckenburger =

- Born: 30 March 1891; Tübingen, German Empire
- Died: 14 October 1944 (aged 53); Belgrade, Yugoslavia
- Military career
- Allegiance: German Empire (to 1918); Weimar Republic (to 1933); Nazi Germany
- Branch: German Army
- Rank: General of the Infantry
- Commands: 125th Infantry Division; XVII Army Corps
- Conflicts: World War I World War II: Belgrade Offensive †
- Awards: Knight's Cross of the Iron Cross

Wilhelm Schneckenburger (30 March 1891 – 14 October 1944) was a general in the Wehrmacht of Nazi Germany during World War II who commanded the XVII Army Corps. He was a recipient of the Knight's Cross of the Iron Cross. Schneckenburger was killed in action on 14 October 1944.

== Awards and decorations ==
- Knight's Cross of the Iron Cross on 1 August 1942 as Generalleutnant and commander of 125. Infanterie Division

Military offices
| Preceded by none | Commander of 125. Infanterie-Division; 5 October 1940 – 24 December 1942 | Succeeded by Generalleutnant Helmut Friebe |
| Preceded by Generalleutnant Dietrich von Choltitz | Commander of XVII. Armeekorps; 5 March 1943 – 1 August 1943 | Succeeded by General der Artillerie Erich Brandenberger |
