= List of Knight's Cross of the Iron Cross recipients (Ka–Km) =

The Knight's Cross of the Iron Cross (German: Ritterkreuz des Eisernen Kreuzes) and its variants were the highest awards in the military and paramilitary forces of Nazi Germany during World War II. The Knight's Cross of the Iron Cross was awarded for a wide range of reasons and across all ranks, from a senior commander for skilled leadership of his troops in battle to a low-ranking soldier for a single act of extreme gallantry. A total of 7,321 awards were made between its first presentation on 30 September 1939 and its last bestowal on 17 June 1945. (Note: Großadmiral and President of Germany Karl Dönitz, Hitler's successor as Head of State (Staatsoberhaupt) and Supreme Commander of the Armed Forces, had ordered the cessation of all promotions and awards as of 11 May 1945 (Dönitz-decree). Consequently the last Knight's Cross awarded to Oberleutnant zur See of the Reserves Georg-Wolfgang Feller on 17 June 1945 must therefore be considered a de facto but not de jure hand-out.) This number is based on the analysis and acceptance of the order commission of the Association of Knight's Cross Recipients (AKCR). Presentations were made to members of the three military branches of the Wehrmacht—the Heer (Army), Kriegsmarine (Navy) and Luftwaffe (Air Force)—as well as the Waffen-SS, the Reichsarbeitsdienst (RAD—Reich Labour Service) and the Volkssturm (German national militia). There were also 43 recipients in the military forces of allies of the Third Reich.

These recipients are listed in the 1986 edition of Walther-Peer Fellgiebel's book, Die Träger des Ritterkreuzes des Eisernen Kreuzes 1939–1945 [The Bearers of the Knight's Cross of the Iron Cross 1939–1945]. Fellgiebel was the former chairman and head of the order commission of the AKCR. In 1996, the second edition of this book was published with an addendum delisting 11 of these original recipients. Author Veit Scherzer has cast doubt on a further 193 of these listings. The majority of the disputed recipients had been nominated for the award in 1945, when the deteriorating situation of Germany during the final days of World War II left a number of nominations incomplete and pending in various stages of the approval process.

Listed here are the 289 Knight's Cross recipients of the Wehrmacht and Waffen-SS whose last name is in the range "Ka–Km". Scherzer has challenged the validity of four of these listings. This is the first of two lists of all 717 Knight's Cross of the Iron Cross recipients whose last names start with "K". The recipients whose last names are in the range "Kn–Kz" are listed at List of Knight's Cross of the Iron Cross recipients (Kn–Kz). The recipients are initially ordered alphabetically by last name. The rank listed is the recipient's rank at the time the Knight's Cross was awarded.

== Background ==
The Knight's Cross of the Iron Cross and its higher grades were based on four separate enactments. The first enactment, Reichsgesetzblatt I S. 1573 of 1 September 1939 instituted the Iron Cross (Eisernes Kreuz), the Knight's Cross of the Iron Cross and the Grand Cross of the Iron Cross (Großkreuz des Eisernen Kreuzes). Article 2 of the enactment mandated that the award of a higher class be preceded by the award of all preceding classes. As the war progressed, some of the recipients of the Knight's Cross distinguished themselves further and a higher grade, the Knight's Cross of the Iron Cross with Oak Leaves (Ritterkreuz des Eisernen Kreuzes mit Eichenlaub), was instituted. The Oak Leaves, as they were commonly referred to, were based on the enactment Reichsgesetzblatt I S. 849 of 3 June 1940. In 1941, two higher grades of the Knight's Cross were instituted. The enactment Reichsgesetzblatt I S. 613 of 28 September 1941 introduced the Knight's Cross of the Iron Cross with Oak Leaves and Swords (Ritterkreuz des Eisernen Kreuzes mit Eichenlaub und Schwertern) and the Knight's Cross of the Iron Cross with Oak Leaves, Swords and Diamonds (Ritterkreuz des Eisernen Kreuzes mit Eichenlaub, Schwertern und Brillanten). At the end of 1944 the final grade, the Knight's Cross of the Iron Cross with Golden Oak Leaves, Swords, and Diamonds (Ritterkreuz des Eisernen Kreuzes mit goldenem Eichenlaub, Schwertern und Brillanten), based on the enactment Reichsgesetzblatt 1945 I S. 11 of 29 December 1944, became the final variant of the Knight's Cross authorized.

== Recipients ==
Knight's Cross of the Iron Cross (Ka–Km)
Service	Number of presentations	Posthumous presentations
Heer	192	15
Kriegsmarine	15	1
Luftwaffe	62	3
Waffen-SS	20	1

The Oberkommando der Wehrmacht (Supreme Command of the Armed Forces) kept separate Knight's Cross lists, one for each of the three military branches, Heer (Army), Kriegsmarine (Navy), Luftwaffe (Air Force) and for the Waffen-SS. Within each of these lists a unique sequential number was assigned to each recipient. The same numbering paradigm was applied to the higher grades of the Knight's Cross, one list per grade. Of the 289 awards made to servicemen whose last name is in the range "Ka–Km", 36 were later awarded the Knight's Cross of the Iron Cross with Oak Leaves, five the Knight's Cross of the Iron Cross with Oak Leaves and Swords and one the Knight's Cross of the Iron Cross with Oak Leaves, Swords and Diamonds; 20 presentations were made posthumously. Heer members received 192 of the medals; 15 went to the Kriegsmarine, 62 to the Luftwaffe, and 20 to the Waffen-SS. The sequential numbers greater than 843 for the Knight's Cross of the Iron Cross with Oak Leaves are unofficial and were assigned by the Association of Knight's Cross Recipients (AKCR) and are therefore denoted in parentheses.

This along with the + (plus) indicates that a higher grade of Knight's Cross was awarded as well.
This along with the * (asterisk), indicates that the Knight's Cross was awarded posthumously.
This along with the ? (question mark) indicates that author Veit Scherzer has expressed doubt regarding the veracity and formal correctness of the listing.

Name	Service	Rank	Role and unit (Note: For an explanation of the various naming schemes used by the Luftwaffe, Heer, Kriegsmarine and Waffen-SS refer to nomenclature used by the Wehrmacht and Waffen-SS.)	Date of award	Notes	Image
Georg Kachel	Heer	Hauptmann	Commander of the I./Grenadier-Regiment 670	4 May 1944	—	—
Wolfgang Kaden	Kriegsmarine	Kapitänleutnant of the Reserves	Commander of U-Jäger UJ-116	18 December 1940	—	—
Herbert Kadenbach	Heer	Feldwebel	Zugführer (platoon leader) in the 12./Jäger-Regiment 28	16 September 1942	—	—
Hellmut Kaeber	Luftwaffe	Oberleutnant	Staffelkapitän of the 1.(N)/Aufklärungs-Gruppe 13 (Note: According to Scherzer as Staffelführer of the 1./Nahaufklärungsgruppe 13.)	28 January 1945	—	—
Walter Käding	Kriegsmarine	Obersteuermann	3rd watch officer and coxswain on U-123	15 May 1944	—	—
Otto Kähler+	Kriegsmarine	Kapitän zur See	Commander of Hilfskreuzer "Thor" (HSK 4)	22 December 1940	Awarded 583rd Oak Leaves 15 September 1944	
Edgar-Karl Kaehne	Heer	Hauptmann (Note: According to Scherzer as Hauptmann of the Reserves.)	Commander of the I./Infanterie-Regiment 135	2 February 1942	—	—
Hans Källner+	Heer	Oberst	Commander of Schützen-Regiment 73	3 May 1942	Awarded 392nd Oak Leaves 12 February 1944; 106th Swords 23 October 1944	—
Edmund Kämmerer	Heer	Oberfeldwebel	Kompanietruppführer (company headquarters leader) in the 6./Panzergrenadier-Regiment 76	5 April 1945	—	—
Helmut Kämpfe	Waffen-SS	SS-Sturmbannführer of the Reserves	Commander of the III.(gepanzerte)/SS-Panzergrenadier-Regiment 4 "Der Führer"	10 December 1943	—	
Rudolf Kaeppel	Heer	Hauptmann	Chief of the Divisions-Begleit-Kompanie of the 11. Panzer-Division	1 February 1945*	Killed in action 25 January 1945	—
Josef Käs	Heer	Oberfeldwebel	Zugführer (platoon leader) in the 2./Grenadier-Regiment 19	18 July 1943	—	—
Herbert Käseberg	Heer	Leutnant	Leader of the 5./Panzergrenadier-Regiment 156	14 April 1945	—	—
Werner Kaessler	Heer	Oberleutnant of the Reserves	Chief of the 2./Panzergrenadier-Regiment 108	27 August 1944*	Died of wounds 23 August 1944	—
Robert Kaestner+	Heer	Major	Leader of Grenadier-Regiment 105	11 December 1943	Awarded 401st Oak Leaves 21 February 1944	—
Ernst Kaether	Heer	Oberstleutnant of the Reserves (Note: According to Scherzer as Oberstleutnant.)	Commander of Infanterie-Regiment 14	10 December 1942	—	—
Clemens-Heinrich Graf von Kageneck+	Heer	Hauptmann	Commander of schwere Panzer-Abteilung 503 (Tiger) (Note: According to Scherzer as commander of schwere Panzer-Abteilung 503.)	4 August 1943	Awarded 513th Oak Leaves 26 June 1944	—
Erbo Graf von Kageneck+	Luftwaffe	Oberleutnant	Staffelkapitän of the 9./Jagdgeschwader 27	30 July 1941	Awarded 39th Oak Leaves 26 October 1941	
Bruno Kahl+	Heer	Hauptmann	Commander of the III./Panzer-Regiment 21	8 February 1943	Awarded 270th Oak Leaves 8 August 1943	—
Konrad Kahl	Luftwaffe	Hauptmann	Gruppenkommandeur of the I./Kampfgeschwader 30	13 August 1942	—	—
Helmuth Kahle	Luftwaffe	Oberfeldwebel	Observer in the 3./Kampfgeschwader 4 "General Wever"	9 June 1944	—	—
Rudolf Kahle	Heer	Hauptmann	Commander of Panzer-Pionier-Bataillon 40	2 September 1944	—	—
Hans-Joachim Kahler+	Heer	Major	Commander of Kradschützen-Bataillon 34	14 April 1943	Awarded 355th Oak Leaves 17 December 1943	—
Erich Kahsnitz	Heer	Oberst	Commander of Füsilier-Regiment "Großdeutschland"	15 July 1943	—	—
Karl Kainz	Heer	Hauptmann of the Reserves	Chief of the 11./Jäger-Regiment 25	31 January 1945	—	—
Albert Kaiser	Heer	Hauptmann	Chief of the 1./Gebirgs-Panzer-Jäger-Abteilung 44	21 August 1941*	Killed in action 6 August 1941	—
Erich Kaiser	Heer	Oberleutnant	Chief of the 6./Panzer-Regiment 39	26 February 1942	—	—
Herbert Kaiser	Luftwaffe	Oberfeldwebel	Pilot in the 8./Jagdgeschwader 77 (later Jagdgeschwader 1) (Note: According to Scherzer as pilot in the 9./Jagdgeschwader 77.)	14 March 1943	—	—
Vinzenz Kaiser	Waffen-SS	SS-Hauptsturmführer	Leader of the III.(gepanzerte)/SS-Panzergrenadier-Regiment 4 "Der Führer" (Note: According to Scherzer as leader of the III.(gepanzerte)/SS-Panzergrenadier-Regiment "Der Führer".)	6 April 1943	—	—
Wilhelm Kaiser	Luftwaffe	Oberleutnant	Adjutant in the III./Sturzkampfgeschwader 2 "Immelmann"	4 February 1942	—	—
Hans Kalb	Heer	Hauptmann of the Reserves	Commander of the II./Grenadier-Regiment 320	29 February 1944	—	—
Helmut Kalbitz+	Heer	Oberleutnant	Chief of the 1./Pionier-Bataillon 125	23 August 1941	Awarded 366th Oak Leaves 7 January 1944	—
Peter Kalden	Luftwaffe	Leutnant	Staffelführer of the 13./Jagdgeschwader 51 "Mölders" (Note: According to Scherzer as pilot in the 13./Jagdgeschwader 51 "Mölders".)	6 December 1944	—	—
Rolf Kaldrack+	Luftwaffe	Hauptmann	Gruppenkommandeur of the III./Zerstörergeschwader 76	2 November 1940	Awarded 70th Oak Leaves 9 February 1942	
Georg Kaletsch	Heer	Oberleutnant of the Reserves	Leader of the II./Grenadier-Regiment 283	26 March 1944	—	—
Herbert von Kalinowsky	Heer	Oberst	Commander of Volks-Werfer-Brigader 8	30 April 1945	—	—
David Kalkgruber	Heer	Unteroffizier	Group leader of the 5./Grenadier-Regiment 3	19 August 1944	—	—
Walter Kalkhoff	Heer	Unteroffizier	Group leader of the 1./Infanterie-Regiment 67 (motorized) (Note: According to Scherzer as group leader of the 1./Infanterie-Regiment 67.)	26 May 1940	—	—
Hennig-Tile von Kalm	Heer	Major	Deputy leader of Grenadier-Regiment 24	17 September 1944	—	—
Siegfried Kalow	Luftwaffe	Unteroffizier	Group leader in the 10./Fallschirm-Panzergrenadier-Regiment 2 "Hermann Göring"	29 October 1944*	Killed in action 12 August 1944	—
Ernst Kals	Kriegsmarine	Korvettenkapitän	Commander of U-130	1 September 1942	—	—
Alois Kalss	Waffen-SS	SS-Obersturmführer	Leader of the 1./schwere SS-Panzer-Abteilung 502	23 August 1944	—	—
Søren Kam	Waffen-SS	SS-Untersturmführer	Leader of the 1./SS-Panzergrenadier-Regiment 9 "Germania"	7 February 1945	—	
Hans Kamecke	Heer	Generalleutnant	Commander of the 137. Infanterie-Division	27 October 1943*	Killed in action 16 October 1943	—
August Kaminski	Heer	Oberfeldwebel	Zugführer (platoon leader) of the 3./schwere Panzer-Jäger-Abteilung 655	6 October 1944	—	—
Herbert Kaminski	Luftwaffe	Hauptmann	Gruppenkommandeur of the I./Zerstörergeschwader 26 "Horst Wessel"	6 August 1941	—	—
Werner Kaminski? (Note: Unlawful presentation to Werner Kaminski by the Dönitz Government (Regierung Dönitz) after 8 May 1945, which can be verified by radio communication dated on 21 May 1945. The presentation date was backdated by Walther-Peer Fellgiebel.)	Heer	Oberstleutnant	Ia (operations officer) of the Festungs-Division Kreta	6 May 1945	—	—
Emil Kaminsky+	Heer	Oberfeldwebel	Zugführer (platoon leader) in Infanterie-Regiment 446 (Note: According to Scherzer as Zugführer (platoon leader) in the 2./Infanterie-Regiment 446.)	15 October 1942	Awarded 497th Oak Leaves 12 June 1944	—
Werner Kamischke	Heer	Hauptmann	Commander of the II./Grenadier-Regiment 4	9 January 1945	—	—
Josef Kammhuber	Luftwaffe	Generalmajor	Commander of the 1. Nachtjagd-Division	9 July 1941	—	A man wearing a military uniform and neck order, in the shape of a cross. He has short hair that is combed back and a determined facial expression.
Gerhard von Kamptz+	Kriegsmarine	Korvettenkapitän	Chief of the 2. Räumbootflottille	6 October 1940	Awarded 225th Oak Leaves 14 April 1943	—
Johann Kamski	Heer	Obergefreiter	In the 14./Grenadier-Regiment z.b.V. 1. Panzer-Armee (Note: According to Scherzer in the 14./Grenadier-Regiment z.b.V. Panzer-AOK 1.)	30 April 1945	—	—
Kurt Kannenberg	Heer	Stabsfeldwebel	Zugführer (platoon leader) in the 3./schwere Panzer-Abteilung 506	9 December 1944*	Killed in action 17 November 1944	—
Wolfgang Kapp	Heer	Major	Commander of Sturmgeschütz-Lehr-Brigade 920	3 March 1945	—	—
Hans-Joachim Kappis+	Heer	Oberleutnant of the Reserves	Deputy leader of the I./Grenadier-Regiment 45	18 February 1945	Awarded (849th) Oak Leaves 28 April 1945	—
Franz Kapsreiter	Heer	Oberfeldwebel	Zugführer (platoon leader) in the 4.(Sturmgeschütz)/Führer-Grenadier-Brigade	14 January 1945	—	—
August Karau	Heer	Oberfeldwebel	Leader of the 9./Grenadier-Regiment 46	12 January 1945	—	—
Adalbert Karbe	Luftwaffe	Oberleutnant	Staffelkapitän of the 3./Kampfgeschwader 55	12 November 1941	—	—
Fritz Karch	Luftwaffe	Hauptmann	Gruppenkommandeur of the II./Jagdgeschwader 2 "Richthofen"	17 April 1945	—	—
Karl-Ehrhart Karcher	Kriegsmarine	Oberleutnant zur See	Commander of Schnellboot S-87 in the 4. Schnellbootflottille	12 August 1943	—	—
Georg Karck	Waffen-SS	SS-Obersturmführer (Note: According to Scherzer as SS-Obersturmführer of the Reserves and leader of the 9./2. SS-Panzergrenadier-Regiment "Leibsatndarte SS Adolf Hitler".)	Leader of the 9./SS-Panzergrenadier-Regiment 2 "Leibsatndarte SS Adolf Hitler"	3 August 1943	—	—
Bruno Karczewski+	Heer	Major	Commander of the I./Grenadier-Regiment 162	12 March 1944	Awarded 767th Oak Leaves 5 March 1945	—
Hennecke Kardel	Heer	Leutnant of the Reserves	Adjutant in the III./Grenadier-Regiment 399	23 February 1944	—	—
Ulrich Karg	Heer	Oberjäger	Leader of the bicycle platoon in the 17./Gebirgsjäger-Regiment 91	5 July 1943	—	—
Franz Karl	Heer	Generalleutnant	Commander of the 263. Infanterie-Division	5 August 1940	—	—
Friedrich-Wilhelm Karl	Waffen-SS	SS-Obersturmbannführer	Commander of SS-Freiwilligen-Panzer-Artillerie-Regiment 11 "Nordland" (Note: According to Scherzer as commander of SS-Artillerie-Regiment 11.)	26 December 1944	—	—
Josef Karl+	Heer	Unteroffizier	Gun commander in the 2./Panzer-Jäger-Abteilung 49	26 August 1943	Awarded 397th Oak Leaves 16 February 1944	A man wearing a military uniform with an Iron Cross displayed at the front of his uniform collar.
Otto Karl	Kriegsmarine	Oberleutnant zur See of the Reserves	Commander of Artillerie-Leichter AF-65 (Note: According to Scherzer as commander of Artillerie-Leichter AF-65 in the 6. Artillerieträger-Flottille.)	21 March 1945	—	—
Gustav Karow	Heer	Oberst of the Reserves	Commander of Grenadier-Regiment 322	19 August 1944	—	—
Albert Karrenberg	Heer	Oberleutnant	Chief of the 2./Panzergrenadier-Regiment 9	11 December 1944	—	—
Friedrich Karst	Heer	Oberst	Commander of Infanterie-Regiment 461	28 August 1942	—	—
Helmut Kassner	Heer	Oberst (Note: According to Scherzer as Oberst of the Reserves.)	Commander of Grenadier-Regiment 975	14 April 1945	—	—
Andreas Kastl	Heer	Feldwebel	Zugführer (platoon leader) in the 11./Grenadier-Regiment 20 (motorized)	14 May 1944	—	—
Gustav Kastner	Heer	Oberleutnant of the Reserves	Leader of the 2./Artillerie-Regiment 389	12 December 1944	—	—
Josef Kastner	Heer	Oberjäger	Zugführer (platoon leader) in the 7./Jäger-Regiment 207	2 June 1943	—	—
Hans Katzenmeier	Heer	Unteroffizier	Zugführer (platoon leader) in the 6./Grenadier-Regiment 698	9 June 1944	—	—
Horst Kaubisch+	Luftwaffe	Hauptmann	Staffelkapitän of the 9./Sturzkampfgeschwader 77	16 November 1942	Awarded 505th Oak Leaves 24 June 1944	—
Helmut Kauermann	Heer	Oberfeldwebel	Zugführer (platoon leader) in the 7./Panzer-Regiment 2	20 March 1944	—	—
Gerhard Kauffmann	Heer	Generalleutnant	Commander of the 256. Infanterie-Division	9 July 1941	—	—
Heinrich Kaup	Heer	Obergefreiter	In the 3./Grenadier-Regiment 184	19 September 1943	—	—
Paul-Albert Kausch+	Waffen-SS	SS-Obersturmbannführer	Commander of SS-Panzer-Abteilung 11 "Hermann von Salza"	23 August 1944	Awarded (845th) Oak Leaves 23 April 1945? (Note: No evidence of the award can be found in the German Federal Archives. Walther-Peer Fellgiebel claimed that Paul-Albert Kausch, at the time wounded in the Reich Chancellery, had received news that according to a radio message received from Panzer AOK 11 had been awarded the Oak Leaves on 23 April 1945 from SS-Brigadeführer Joachim Ziegler. Ziegler, the Division commander of Kausch, was killed in action on 1 May 1945. Ernst-Günther Krätschmer however indicated that Kausch was wounded 25 April, therefore he couldn’t have received the news on 25 April. The 11th SS Volunteer Panzergrenadier Division Nordland was only subordinated to the 11th Panzer Armee in February 1945. The Stab of the 11th Panzer Army then relocated to the Western Front where it surrendered on 21 April. Krätschmer claimed that the award was presented for the actions during the middle of April east of Berlin. Mr. J.S. Fischer, who was verifying the Oak Leaves presentation on behalf of Fellgiebel is not aware of a radio message received from the Panzer AOK 11. Fischer indicated that he only referenced the information presented by Kausch, which is already stated in Krätschmer. According to information by Fischer on 14 October 2004, Fellgiebel had made the note about the Panzer AOK 11. The sequential number "845" was assigned by the Association of Knight's Cross Recipients (AKCR), according to Krätschmer the number is "846", the date was accepted by the AKCR. Kausch was member of the AKCR.)	—
Oskar Kautz	Heer	Oberleutnant	Chief of the 7./Panzergrenadier-Regiment 156 (Note: According to Scherzer as chief of the 7./Panzergrenadier-Regiment (motorized) 156.)	28 July 1943*	Killed in action 22 July 1943	—
Alfred Kayß	Heer	Oberleutnant	Company chief in Feldersatz-Bataillon 267	18 January 1944*	Killed in action 5 January 1944	—
Paul Kazmeier (Note: Name may also be spelled Paul Kazmaier.)	Heer	Hauptmann of the Reserves	Leader of the II./Grenadier-Regiment 420	26 October 1943	—	—
Franz Kecht	Heer	Oberleutnant	Leader of the III./Grenadier-Regiment 70	18 October 1943	—	—
Johannes Keck	Heer	Leutnant of the Reserves	Leader of the 2./Panzer-Aufklärungs-Abteilung 23	18 February 1945	—	—
Karl Keck	Waffen-SS	SS-Hauptsturmführer and Hauptmann of the Schutzpolizei	Leader of the 15.(Pionier)/SS-Panzergrenadier-Regiment 21 "Frundsberg" (Note: According to Scherzer as leader of the 15./SS-Panzergrenadier-Regiment 21.)	23 August 1944*	Killed in action 11 July 1944	—
Ernst-Georg Kedzia+	Heer	Hauptmann	Leader of the II./Grenadier-Regiment 272	26 November 1944	Awarded 794th Oak Leaves 23 March 1945	—
Heinrich Keese+	Heer	Oberleutnant of the Reserves	Chief of the 2./Pionier-Bataillon 20 (motorized)	20 October 1944	Awarded 805th Oak Leaves 28 March 1945	—
Karl-Ludwig Kegel	Heer	Leutnant	Leader of the 5./Panzer-Regiment 18	25 August 1941	—	—
Otto Keichel	Heer	Oberfeldwebel	Spähtruppführer (reconnaissance troop leader) in the 1./Panzer-Aufklärungs-Lehr-Abteilung 130	18 January 1945	—	—
Anton Keil	Luftwaffe	Hauptmann	Gruppenkommandeur of the II./Sturzkampfgeschwader 1	19 August 1940	—	—
Günther Keil	Heer	Oberstleutnant of the Reserves	Commander of Grenadier-Regiment 919	27 July 1944	—	—
Max Keil	Heer	Oberleutnant	Deputy leader of the 1./Panzer-Regiment 8 in the DAK (Note: According to Scherzer as deputy leader of the 1./Panzer-Regiment 8.)	20 April 1943*	Killed in action 8 April 1943	—
Siegfried Keiling	Heer	Hauptmann	Commander of Artillerie-Abteilung 62 (russisch) (Note: According to Scherzer as commander of Artillerie-Abteilung 621 (russisch).)	4 October 1944	—	—
Walter Keiner	Heer	Generalleutnant	Commander of the 62. Infanterie-Division	17 July 1941	—	—
Willy Keipp	Heer	Feldwebel	Zugführer (platoon leader) in the 6./Grenadier-Regiment 124	30 October 1943	—	—
Paul Keiser	Heer	Oberst	Commander of Grenadier-Regiment 326	6 November 1943	—	—
Wilhelm Keitel	Heer	Generaloberst	Chief of the Oberkommando der Wehrmacht	30 September 1939	—	A man wearing a military uniform with various military decorations, mustache and neck order, in the shape of a cross. He has short hair that is combed back and a determined facial expression.
Albert Kelbch	Luftwaffe	Oberfeldwebel	Pilot in the 1.(F)/Aufklärungs-Gruppe 120 (Note: According to Scherzer as pilot in the Aufklärungsstaffel 1.(F)/122.)	12 November 1943*	Killed in action 8 November 1943	—
Gerd Kelbling	Kriegsmarine	Kapitänleutnant	Commander of U-593	18 August 1943	—	—
Alfred Keller	Luftwaffe	General der Flieger	Commanding general of the IV. Fliegerkorps	24 June 1940	—	
Lothar Keller	Luftwaffe	Hauptmann	Gruppenkommandeur of the II./Jagdgeschwader 3	9 July 1941*	Killed in flying accident 26 June 1941	
Ortwin Kellermann	Heer	Oberleutnant of the Reserves	Chief of the 1./Divisions-Füsilier-Bataillon (A.A.) 72 (Note: According to Scherzer as chief of the 1./Divisions-Füsilier-Bataillon 72.)	30 September 1944	—	—
Wolfgang Kellner	Heer	Oberleutnant	Chief of the 1./Panzer-Jäger-Abteilung 24	14 April 1945	—	—
Heinz Kemethmüller	Luftwaffe	Feldwebel	Pilot in the 8./Jagdgeschwader 3 "Udet" (Note: According to Scherzer as pilot in the III./Jagdgeschwader 3 "Udet".)	2 October 1942	—	—
Heinrich Kemler	Heer	Hauptmann	Commander of the II./Grenadier-Regiment 78	14 April 1945	—	—
Friedrich Kemnade+	Kriegsmarine	Kapitänleutnant	Chief of the 3. Schnellbootflottille	23 July 1942	Awarded 249th Oak Leaves 27 May 1943	—
Traugott Kempas+	Heer	Hauptmann	Commander of the I./Grenadier-Regiment 176	9 December 1944	Awarded 757th Oak Leaves 28 February 1945	—
Walter Kempe	Heer	Feldwebel	Zugführer (platoon leader) in the 2./Pionier-Bataillon 248	14 May 1944	—	—
Karl Kempf	Luftwaffe	Oberfeldwebel	Pilot in the 7./Jagdgeschwader 54	4 February 1942	—	—
Werner Kempf+	Heer	Generalleutnant	Commander of the 6. Panzer-Division	3 June 1940	Awarded 111th Oak Leaves 10 August 1942	
Günther Kempin	Luftwaffe	Feldwebel	Pilot in the 14./Kampfgeschwader 27 "Boelcke"	17 April 1945	—	—
Wilhelm Kempke	Luftwaffe	Feldwebel	Group leader in the 1./Fallschirmjäger-Sturm-Regiment (7. Flieger-Division) (Note: According to Scherzer as group leader in the 1./Luftlande-Sturm-Regiment 1.)	21 August 1941	—	—
[Dr.] Heinrich Kempken (Note: The brackets around the doctor title [Dr.] denotes that the academic title was attained after the Knight's Cross of the Iron Cross was awarded.)	Luftwaffe	Fahnenjunker-Feldwebel	Pilot in the 7./Schlachtgeschwader 3	29 October 1944	—	—
Rudolf Kendler	Heer	Hauptmann of the Reserves	Tasked with the leadership of Panzer-Aufklärungs-Abteilung 4 (Note: According to Scherzer as leader of Panzer-Aufklärungs-Abteilung 4.)	2 September 1944	—	—
Karl Kennel+	Luftwaffe	Hauptmann (Note: According to Scherzer as Oberleutnant.)	Staffelkapitän of the 5./Schlachtgeschwader 1	19 September 1943	Awarded 666th Oak Leaves 25 November 1944	—
Eitel-Friedrich Kentrat	Kriegsmarine	Kapitänleutnant	Commander of U-74	31 December 1941	—	—
Wilhelm Keppel	Heer	Unteroffizier	Assistant Vorgeschobener Beobachter (forward observer) in 7./Artillerie-Regiment 227	9 June 1944	—	—
Georg Keppler	Waffen-SS	SS-Oberführer	Commander of SS-Infanterie-Regiment (motorized) "Der Führer" in the SS-Verfügungs-Division (later "Das Reich") (Note: According to Scherzer as commander of SS-Standarte "Der Führer".)	15 August 1940	—	
Hans Keppler	Luftwaffe	Major	Gruppenkommandeur of the III./Kampfgeschwader 1 "Hindenburg"	20 August 1942	—	—
Ludwig Kepplinger	Waffen-SS	SS-Hauptscharführer	Shock troops leader and Zugführer (platoon leader) in the 11./SS-Infanterie-Regiment "Der Führer"	4 September 1940	—	—
Fritz Kercher	Heer	Leutnant	Zugführer (platoon leader) in the 1.(Sturmgeschütz)/Panzer-Jäger-Abteilung 5 (Note: According to Scherzer as Zugführer (platoon leader) in the 1./Panzer-Jäger-Abteilung 5.)	6 March 1944	—	—
Horst Kerfin	Luftwaffe	Oberleutnant	Chief of the 11./Fallschirmjäger-Regiment 1 (Note: According to Scherzer as Zugführer (platoon leader) in the 11./Fallschirmjäger-Regiment 1.)	24 May 1940	—	—
Friedrich Kern	Heer	Hauptmann of the Reserves	Commander of the III./Artillerie-Regiment 198	30 December 1943	—	—
Karl Kern	Luftwaffe	Oberfeldwebel	Pilot in the 6./Transportgeschwader 3 (Note: According to Scherzer as pilot in the 5./Transportgeschwader 3.)	9 June 1944	—	—
Wilhelm Kern	Heer	Oberleutnant	Chief of the 10./Grenadier-Regiment 44	5 April 1944	—	—
Albert Kerscher	Heer	Feldwebel	Panzer commander in the 2./schwere Panzer-Abteilung 502	23 October 1944	—	—
Wolfram Kertz	Heer	Oberleutnant of the Reserves	Leader of the 8./Kampfgruppe "Bruhn" (II./SS-Panzerkorps) (Note: According to Scherzer as leader of the 8./Kampfgruppe "Bruhn" [emergency unit with the II SS Panzer Corps, area Arnhem, Netherlands].)	4 October 1944	—	—
Hellmut Kerutt	Luftwaffe	Major	Commander of Fallschirmjäger-Bataillon "Kerutt" (Note: According to Scherzer as commander of Fallschirmjäger-Bataillon "Kerutt" [augmented I./Fallschirmjäger-Regiment 18 (alt—old)].)	2 February 1945	—	—
Karl Kessel	Luftwaffe	Oberstleutnant	Geschwaderkommodore of Kampfgeschwader 2	23 January 1944 (Note: According to Scherzer on 24 January 1944.)	—	—
Mortimer von Kessel+	Heer	Generalmajor	Commander of the 20. Panzer-Division	28 December 1943	Awarded 611th Oak Leaves 16 October 1944	
Wilhelm Kessel	Heer	Oberwachtmeister	Zugführer (platoon leader) in the 3./Panzer-Aufklärungs-Abteilung "Großdeutschland"	23 February 1944	—	—
Albert Kesselring+	Luftwaffe	General der Flieger	Chief of Luftflotte 1 (Note: According to Scherzer as chief of Luftflotte 1 and commander-in-chief east.)	30 September 1939	Awarded 78th Oak Leaves 25 February 1942; 15th Swords 18 July 1942; 14th Diamonds 19 July 1944	Head-and-shoulders portrait of a uniformed Nazi German air force general in his 50s wearing an Iron Cross.
Arnold Kessler	Heer	Major	Commander of Panzer-Jäger-Abteilung 61	4 October 1944	—	—
Hermann Keßler	Heer	Oberst	Commander of Grenadier-Regiment 192	17 September 1943	—	—
Ulrich Kessler	Luftwaffe	Generalleutnant	Fliegerführer Atlantik	8 April 1944	—	
Wolfgang Kessler	Heer	Oberleutnant of the Reserves	Deputy leader of the I./Artillerie-Regiment 181	16 April 1944	—	—
Dieter Kesten	Waffen-SS	SS-Hauptsturmführer	Leader of the 6./SS-Panzer-Regiment 2 "Das Reich" (Note: According to Scherzer as leader of the 6./SS-Panzer-Regiment 2.)	12 November 1943	—	—
Gerd Freiherr von Ketelhodt	Heer	Oberleutnant	Chief of the 9./Infanterie-Regiment 472	13 July 1940	—	—
Hans Ketscher	Luftwaffe	Hauptmann	Observer in the 1.(F)/Aufklärungs-Gruppe 121 (Note: According to Scherzer on 24 October 1944 as observer in the Aufklärungsstaffel 1.(F)/121.)	24 November 1944	—	—
Karl Ketterer	Heer	Oberfeldwebel	Zugführer (platoon leader) in the 7./Panzer-Regiment 15	24 March 1943	—	—
Franz Ketterl	Heer	Oberleutnant (Note: According to Scherzer as Oberleutnant of the Reserves.)	Chief of the 1./Infanterie-Regiment 438	12 January 1942	—	—
Hans Kettgen	Waffen-SS	SS-Hauptsturmführer	Commander of the I./SS-Panzergrenadier-Regiment "Schill" (Note: According to Scherzer as commander of the I./SS-Panzergrenadier-Regiment "Schill" [emergency unit from SS-Panzergrenadier-Schule Kienschlag and SS-Panzergrenadier-Ausbildungs-und-Ersatz_Bataillon 10].)	14 February 1945	—	—
Rudolf Kettmann	Heer	Unteroffizier	Assault gun leader in the Panzer-Jäger-Kompanie 1122	17 April 1945	—	—
Dr. med. Walter Keup	Heer	Assistenzarzt (assistant doctor—rank equivalent to Leutnant) (Note: According to Scherzer as Assistenzarzt of the Reserves.)	Battalion doctor of the I./Füsilier-Regiment 202	21 March 1944	—	—
Friedrich von Keußler	Heer	Oberst	Commander of Grenadier-Regiment 1	23 February 1944	—	—
Eduard Kiefer (Note: Scherzer provides three possible name variants, Eduard-Heinrich Kiefer, Till Kiwe and Eduard-Heinrich Kiver.)	Luftwaffe	Hauptmann	Chief of the 2./Panzer-Aufklärungs-Abteilung "Hermann Göring"	18 May 1943	—	—
Hermann Kiefer	Heer	Oberleutnant	Commander of Stellungs-Kampfgruppe XII./2 (416. Infanterie-Division) (Note: According to Scherzer as commander of Stellungs-Kampfgruppe XII./2 ["Gneisenau-Einheit" of Wehrkreis XII, subordinated to the 416. Infanterie-Division].)	5 April 1945	—	—
Martin Kiefer	Heer	Unteroffizier	Group leader in the 7./Grenadier-Regiment 320	12 August 1944	—	—
Dr. phil. Emil Kieffer	Kriegsmarine	Korvettenkapitän of the Reserves	Chief of the 3. Minensuchflottille	3 December 1944	—	—
Rudolf Kiehl	Heer	Hauptmann	Leader of the Kampfstaffel in the DAK Begleitkommando "Rommel" and leader of Kampfgruppe "Kiehl" (Note: According to Scherzer as leader of the Kampfstaffel Panzer AOK Afrika (Begleitkommando "Rommel").)	6 July 1942	—	—
Johannes Kiel	Luftwaffe	Oberleutnant of the Reserves	Pilot in the I./Zerstörergeschwader 26 "Horst Wessel"	18 March 1942	—	—
Rudolf Kiel	Luftwaffe	Hauptmann	Gruppenkommandeur of the I./Kampfgeschwader 55	20 December 1941	—	—
Fritz Kienast	Heer	Oberleutnant	Leader of the 1./Füsilier-Bataillon "Deba" (Note: According to Scherzer as leader of the 1./Füsilier-Bataillon "Deba" [commander of Fester Platz Tarnopol].)	9 April 1944	—	—
August Kiene	Heer	Leutnant	Leader of the 7./Panzergrenadier-Regiment 14	4 May 1944	—	—
Werner Kienitz	Heer	General der Infanterie	Commanding general of the XVII. Armeekorps	31 August 1941	—	—
Willy Kientsch+	Luftwaffe	Leutnant	Staffelführer of the 6./Jagdgeschwader 27 (Note: According to Scherzer as pilot in the II./Jagdgeschwader 27.)	22 November 1943	Awarded 527th Oak Leaves 20 July 1944	—
Heinrich Kiermeier	Heer	Unteroffizier	Group leader in the 8./Grenadier-Regiment 423	23 August 1944	—	—
Wilhelm Kieser	Heer	Major of the Reserves	Commander of the II./Grenadier-Regiment 313	16 September 1943	—	—
Gustav Kieseritzky	Kriegsmarine	Vizeadmiral	Commanding Admiral Schwarzes Meer (Black Sea)	20 November 1943*	Killed in action 19 November 1943	—
Peter Kiesgen	Heer	Leutnant	Leader of the 1./Infanterie-Regiment 239	5 October 1941	—	—
Franz Kieslich+	Luftwaffe	Oberleutnant	Staffelkapitän of the 7./Sturzkampfgeschwader 77	5 January 1943	Awarded 619th Oak Leaves 18 October 1944	—
Heinrich Kiesling+	Heer	Major	Commander of the III./Grenadier-Regiment 768	10 June 1943	Awarded 321st Oak Leaves 7 November 1943	—
Helmut Kiesling	Heer	Hauptmann of the Reserves	Leader of the II./Grenadier-Regiment 336	1 September 1943	—	—
[Dr.] Walter Kiess	Luftwaffe	Oberleutnant	Chief of the Lastensegler-Kommando in the Fallschirmjäger-Sturm Abteilung "Koch" (Note: According to Scherzer as chief of the Lastensegler-Kommando in the Luftlande-Sturm Abteilung "Koch".)	12 May 1940	—	—
[Dr.] Gunter Kilian	Luftwaffe	Leutnant	Staffelführer of the 2./Schlachtgeschwader 77	2 April 1945	—	—
Gustav Kilian	Heer	Hauptmann of the Reserves	Leader of the 1./Infanterie-Wach-Bataillon 591 (Note: According to Scherzer as leader of the 1./Wach-Bataillon 591.)	15 May 1942	—	—
Wilhelm Kilian	Heer	Major	Commander of Divisions-Füsilier-Bataillon (A.A.) 102 (Note: According to Scherzer as commander of Divisions-Füsilier-Bataillon 102.)	8 February 1945	—	—
Friedrich Kimmich	Heer	Major of the Landwehr	Leader of the II./Grenadier-Regiment 554	11 December 1942	—	—
Hans-Jörg Kimmich	Heer	Hauptmann	Regiment adjutant in Grenadier-Regiment 119 (motorized) (Note: According to Scherzer as adjutant in Grenadier-Regiment 119.)	25 January 1945	—	—
Georg Kinder	Heer	Hauptmann	Commander of the II./Grenadier-Regiment 102	8 February 1944	—	—
[Dr.] Alfred Kindler	Luftwaffe	Hauptmann	Staffelkapitän of the 6./Kampfgeschwader 2	24 September 1942	—	—
Helmut Kinz? (Note: No evidence of the award can be found in the German Federal Archives. Also was never processed by the Order Commission of the Association of Knight's Cross Recipients (AKCR). According to Von Semen, it was presumably presented by General Maximilian de Angelis on the basis of the Dönitz-decree. Walther-Peer Fellgiebel noted in his book: "A justification for the presentation was not given".)	Waffen-SS	SS-Hauptsturmführer	Commander of Waffen-Gebirgs-Aufklärungs-Abteilung 13 of the SS	3 May 1945	—	—
Eberhard Kinzel	Heer	Oberst im Generalstab (in the General Staff)	In the Generalstab des Heeres (Note: According to Scherzer on 21 December 1942 as chief department GZ [Zentralabteilung—central department] with the chief of the Generalstab des Heeres [until November 1942 chief of the General Staff XXIX Armeekorps].)	23 December 1942	—	A black-and-white photograph of a man wearing a military uniform and coat, peaked cap holding gloves in his hands.
Rudi Kinzinger	Heer	Oberleutnant	Chief of the Pionier-Kompanie/Jäger-Regiment 49	18 February 1945*	Killed in action 16 February 1945	—
Walter Kipfmüller	Luftwaffe	Hauptmann	Staffelkapitän of the 2./Kampfgeschwader 77	29 October 1943	—	—
Heinrich Kirchheim	Heer	Generalmajor	Commander of the Sonderstelle Libyen (special office Libya) and leader of the Italian Division "Brescia" (Note: According to Scherzer as commander of the Sonderstelle Libyen (special office Libya) of the Oberkommando des Heeres and leader of the Italian Division "Brescia".)	14 May 1941	—	
Ernst Kirchlehner	Heer	Unteroffizier	Group leader in the 2./Füsilier-Bataillon 126 (Note: According to Scherzer as group leader in the 2./Divisions-Füsilier-Bataillon 126.)	23 October 1944*	Killed in action 14 July 1944	—
Friedrich Kirchner+	Heer	Generalleutnant	Commander of the 1. Panzer-Division	20 May 1940	Award 391st Oak Leaves 12 February 1944; 127th Swords 26 January 1945	A man wearing a military uniform with an Iron Cross displayed at the front of his uniform collar.
Heinz Kirchner	Heer	Leutnant of the Reserves	Zugführer (platoon leader) in the 1./Schützen-Regiment 113	29 September 1941	—	—
Kurt Kirchner	Heer	Wachtmeister	Gun leader in Sturmgeschütz-Batterie 667	20 February 1942	—	—
Otto Kirchner	Waffen-SS	SS-Untersturmführer	Leader of Stabsschwadron/SS-Reiter-Regiment 16	21 April 1944	—	—
Dietrich Kirn (Note: Dietrich Kirn is a cover name used while serving in the Abwehr (military intelligence). His real name is Dietrich Witzel.)	Heer	Hauptmann	Leader of Frontaufklärungs-Kommando 202	12 December 1944	—	—
Hans Kirn	Luftwaffe	Oberfeldwebel	Pilot in the 8./Kampfgeschwader 6	29 February 1944	—	—
Julius Kirn	Heer	Hauptmann	Chief of the 1./Panzer-Regiment 18	17 July 1941*	Died of wounds 16 July 1941	—
Walter Kirsch	Heer	Oberleutnant of the Reserves	Chief of the 7./Grenadier-Regiment 161	6 March 1944	—	—
Heinz Kirsche	Heer	Oberleutnant of the Reserves	Leader of the 2./Pionier-Bataillon 658	13 January 1942	—	—
Wilhelm Kirschenmann	Heer	Unteroffizier	Group leader in the 7./Grenadier-Regiment 82	12 March 1943	—	—
Joachim Kirschner+	Luftwaffe	Leutnant	Staffelführer of the 5./Jagdgeschwader 3 "Udet"	23 December 1942	Awarded 267th Oak Leaves 2 August 1943	—
Ludwig Kirschner+	Heer	Major	Commander of the I./Infanterie-Regiment 436	18 January 1942	Awarded 135th Oak Leaves 28 October 1942	—
Ernst Kirsten	Heer	Leutnant of the Reserves	Leader of the 4./Grenadier-Regiment 410	15 May 1944*	Killed in action 19 April 1944	—
Rudi Kirsten	Heer	Hauptmann	Leader of Panzergrenadier-Ersatz und Ausbildungs-Abteilung "Großdeutschland"	28 March 1945	—	—
Hans Kissel	Heer	Oberst	Commander of Grenadier-Regiment 683	17 March 1944	—	—
Paul Kitta	Heer	Feldwebel	Zugführer (platoon leader) in the 1./Grenadier-Regiment 439	23 February 1944	—	—
Dipl.-Ing. Friedrich Kittel	Heer	Generalmajor	Commander of the 62. Volks-Grenadier-Division	9 January 1945	—	—
Heinrich Kittel	Heer	Generalmajor	Combat commander of Lemberg	12 August 1944	—	A man wearing a military uniform with an Iron Cross displayed at the front of his uniform collar.
Kurt Kittel	Heer	Obergefreiter	Granatwerfertruppführer (grenade thrower troop leader) in the 5./Grenadier-Regiment 88	29 November 1944	—	—
Otto Kittel+	Luftwaffe	Oberfeldwebel	Pilot in the 2./Jagdgeschwader 54 (Note: According to Scherzer as pilot in the I./Jagdgeschwader 54.)	29 October 1943	Awarded 449th Oak Leaves 11 April 1944; 113th Swords 25 November 1944	—
Hans Klärmann	Heer	Hauptmann	Leader of the II./Grenadier-Regiment 361	9 September 1942	—	—
Hans Klaiber	Luftwaffe	Leutnant	Zugführer (platoon leader) in the 3.(I)/Flak-Regiment 11 (motorized) (Note: According to Scherzer as Meß- und Erkundungsoffizier (measuring and reconnaissance officer) in the 3./Flak-Regiment 9.)	26 July 1942	—	—
Hans Klammeck	Heer	Oberfeldwebel	Zugführer (platoon leader) in the 4.(MG)/Grenadier-Regiment 1082 (Note: According to Scherzer as Zugführer (platoon leader) in the 4./Grenadier-Regiment 1082.)	10 February 1945	—	—
Günter Klappich+	Heer	Oberleutnant	Chief of the 11./Infanterie-Regiment 60 (motorized)	31 July 1942	Awarded 254th Oak Leaves 8 June 1943	—
Edmund Klar	Heer	Wachtmeister	Vorgeschobener Beobachter (forward observer) in the 3./Artillerie-Regiment 122	17 June 1943	—	—
Fritz Klasing+	Heer	Oberstleutnant of the Reserves	Commander of Grenadier-Regiment 446	12 August 1944	Awarded 745th Oak Leaves 19 February 1945	—
Helmut Klassmann	Kriegsmarine	Kapitänleutnant	Chief of the 3. Räumbootsflottille	22 December 1943	—	—
Paul Klatt+	Heer	Oberst	Commander of Gebirgsjäger-Regiment 138	4 January 1943	Awarded 686th Oak Leaves 26 December 1944	A man wearing a military uniform with an Iron Cross displayed at the front of his uniform collar.
Werner Klaucke	Heer	Leutnant of the Reserves	Zugführer (platoon leader) in the 3./Panzer-Jäger-Abteilung 200	4 July 1944	—	—
Johann-Alfred Klaus	Luftwaffe	Oberleutnant	Staffelführer of the 6./Schlachtgeschwader 1	26 March 1944	—	—
Ludwig Klaus	Heer	Major	Commander of Panzer-Jäger-Abteilung 340	7 October 1944	—	—
Otto Klaus	Heer	Hauptmann	Commander of the II./Grenadier-Regiment 333	17 September 1944	—	—
Franz Klausgraber	Heer	Hauptmann	Commander of the III./Infanterie-Regiment 227	13 March 1942	—	—
Erich Klawe+	Heer	Hauptmann	Leader of the I./Infanterie-Regiment 23	12 July 1942	Awarded 227th Oak Leaves 14 April 1943	—
Ludwig Kleber	Heer	Oberleutnant (Note: According to Scherzer as Oberleutnant of the Reserves.)	Chief of the 1./Feld-Ersatz-Bataillon 212	5 April 1945*	Killed in action 9 February 1945	—
Friedrich Klee	Heer	Unteroffizier	Leader of the assault platoon/Füsilier-Bataillon 126	21 January 1945	—	—
Karl Kleeberger	Heer	Unteroffizier	Group leader in the 1./Grenadier-Regiments Gruppe 554	9 June 1944	—	—
Ulrich Kleemann+	Heer	Oberst	Commander of the 3. Schützen-Brigade	13 October 1941	Awarded 304th Oak Leaves 16 September 1943	—
Willy Kleemann	Heer	Oberfähnrich	Leader of the 2./Panzer-Pionier-Bataillon 51	11 January 1945	—	—
Paul-Georg Kleffel	Heer	Oberleutnant of the Reserves	Chief of the 4./Panzer-Aufklärungs-Abteilung 3	14 May 1944	—	—
Philipp Kleffel	Heer	Generalleutnant	Commander of the 1. Infanterie-Division	17 February 1942	—	—
Franz Kleffner	Waffen-SS	SS-Sturmbannführer	Commander of SS-Kradschützen-Bataillon "Totenkopf" (Note: According to Scherzer as commander of SS-"Totenkopf"-Kradschützen-Bataillon.)	19 February 1942	—	—
Fritz Kleim	Heer	Unteroffizier	Group leader in the 5./Grenadier-Brigade 388	3 November 1944	—	—
Hans Kleimann (Note: According to Scherzer his name is spelled Hans Kleinmann who received the Knight's Cross of the Iron Cross as a Zugführer (platoon leader) in the 8./Grenadier-Regiment 426.)	Heer	Unteroffizier	Zugführer (platoon leader) in the 8.(MG)/Grenadier-Regiment 426	5 April 1945	—	—
Alfons Klein	Luftwaffe	Oberleutnant	Staffelkapitän of the 10./Jagdgeschwader 11	27 April 1945	—	—
[Dr.] Armin Klein	Luftwaffe	Leutnant	Leader of the 15./Fallschirm-Flak-Regiment "Hermann Göring"	12 March 1945	—	—
Georg Klein	Heer	Feldwebel	Zugführer (platoon leader) in the 15./Jäger-Regiment 204	27 August 1943	—	—
Gerhard Klein	Heer	Oberstleutnant	Commander of the Waffenschule (weapons school) AOK 9 (Note: According to Scherzer as commander of the Armee-Waffen-Schule (army weapons school) AOK 9.)	30 December 1943	—	—
Heinrich Klein	Luftwaffe	Hauptmann	Staffelkapitän of the 2./Kampfgeschwader 27 "Boelcke"	10 June 1943	—	—
Dr. Herbert Klein	Luftwaffe	Oberleutnant	Pilot in the Stabsstaffel I./Kampfgeschwader 100	29 February 1944	—	—
Hermann Klein+	Heer	Oberleutnant of the Reserves	Regiment adjutant of Grenadier-Regiment 551 (Note: According to Scherzer as adjutant of Grenadier-Regiment 551.)	15 April 1944	Awarded 567th Oak Leaves 2 September 1944	—
Kurt Klein	Heer	Oberfeldwebel	Zugführer (platoon leader) in the 12.(MG)/Grenadier-Regiment 424 (Note: According to Scherzer as Zugführer (platoon leader) in the 12./Grenadier-Regiment 424.)	16 April 1944	—	—
Max Klein	Heer	Feldwebel	Zugführer (platoon leader) in the 2./Grenadier-Regiment 485	9 April 1944	—	—
Walter Klein	Heer	Major	Commander of the III./Infanterie-Regiment 193	9 May 1940	—	—
Erhard Kleindienst	Heer	Leutnant (Note: According to Scherzer as Leutnant of the Reserves.)	Leader of the 8./Jäger-Regiment 28	18 December 1944*	Killed in action 11 October 1944	—
Matthias Kleinheisterkamp+	Waffen-SS	SS-Brigadeführer and Generalmajor of the Waffen-SS	Commander of SS-Division "Das Reich"	31 March 1942	Awarded (871st) Oak Leaves 9 May 1945? (Note: Scherzer expressed doubt about the veracity of the presentation of the Oak Leaves to Matthias Kleinheisterkamp. According to Scherzer, Fellgiebel claims that the nomination was received by the Heerespersonalamt (HPA—Army Staff Office) via teleprinter from the commander-in-chief of the 9. Armee, General Theodor Busse, on 21 April 1945. Busse had nominated SS-Obergruppenführer Kleinheisterkamp for the Oak Leaves. The claim is that the teleprinter message contained a note that the formal procedure for immediate approval should be waited for (Dienstwegvorschlag bzgl. Sofortverleihung abwarten). This teleprinter message cannot be found in the German Nation Archives (Bestand RH 7). Busse had also nominated by teleprinter message Generalmajor Joachim von Siegroth on the 21 April. This teleprinter message can be found in the Nation Archives (Bundesarchiv RH 7/300). According to Fellgiebel the same note can be found on von Siegroth's nomination. This means that a formal nomination, in this instance via the Army Group Vistula, followed. Both announced "formal nominations" never followed and were never received by the HPA. The teleprinter message nomination of von Siegroth is listed in the book of "Verliehene Ritterkreuze" (Awarded Knight Crosses) with an entry date of 21 April but Kleinheisterkamp's nomination isn't. The reason for this may be that the liaison officer of the Waffen-SS at the HPA/P5a may have forwarded the nomination to the Reichsführer-SS for approval. From here it should have been returned to the HPA, which it wasn't. The distribution list of von Siegroth's nomination indicates that general Busse had informed the Army Group Vistula and the chief of the HPA general Wilhelm Burgdorf. It is very likely that Kleinheisterkamp's nomination had the same distribution list as von Siegroth's, because the same principles applied. Burgdorf therefore should have been informed of the formal procedure regarding Kleinheisterkamp's nomination. The question remains unanswered whether the Führer Headquarter or Adolf Hitler has approved the direct nomination of Kleinheisterkamp on 28 April or not. Scherzer claims that this is very unlikely because Burgdorf would not have done two things. First, submit a nomination to the Führer without having assessed the situation himself, which only would have been possible if he had studied the formal paperwork. Secondly he would not have bypassed the formal procedure which was already initiated. Additionally the radio connection to the Führerbunker was down since 5:00 on 28 April 1945. The sequential number "871" was assigned by the Association of Knight's Cross Recipients (AKCR) and the date is assumed.)	
Alfons Kleinmann	Heer	Hauptmann	Leader of the I./Grenadier-Regiment 118	14 August 1943	—	—
Ernst Kleinschmidt	Heer	Leutnant of the Reserves	Adjutant in Panzergrenadier-Regiment 111 (Note: According to Scherzer as battalion adjutant in Panzergrenadier-Regiment 111.)	30 September 1943	—	—
Werner Kleinschmidt	Heer	Hauptmann	Company chief in the Aufklärungs-Abteilung 341 (motorized)	14 December 1941	—	—
Paul Ludwig Ewald von Kleist+	Heer	General der Kavallerie	Commanding general of the XXII. Armeekorps (Panzer-Gruppe "von Kleist")	15 May 1940	Awarded 72nd Oak Leaves 17 February 1942; 60th Swords 30 March 1944	The head and shoulders of a man sitting, shown in semi profile. He wears a beaked cap and a military uniform, and an Iron Cross displayed at the front of his uniform collar. His left hand is gloved and he is holding the hilt of a saber in both hands. His facial expression is a determined; his head is pointed to the right of the camera.
Jarislaff von Kleist-Retzow	Heer	Major	Commander of the II./Artillerie-Regiment 161	14 February 1945	—	—
Helmut Klemann	Heer	Oberleutnant	Leader of the 2./Panzergrenadier-Regiment 59	28 October 1944	—	—
Hans Klemm	Heer	Unteroffizier	Group leader in the 2./Infanterie-Regiment "Großdeutschland" (motorized)	10 December 1942	—	—
Rudolf Klemm	Luftwaffe	Hauptmann	Staffelkapitän of the 10./Jagdgeschwader 54 (Note: According to Scherzer as Staffelkapitän in the IV./Jagdgeschwader 54.)	18 November 1944	—	—
Heinrich Klemt? (Note: No evidence of the award can be found in the German Federal Archives. Walther-Peer Fellgiebel, just like Gerhard von Seemen, assumed a presentation via the chief of the Heerespersonalamt (HPA—Army Personnel Office) Wilhelm Burgdorf to be very unlikely. The Führer-Grenadier-Division had been deployed in Silesia and the Ostmark (Austria) in March 1945 and not in the vicinity of Berlin. Scherzer was denied access to files, which could help clarify the case, of the Association of Knight's Cross Recipients (AKCR) on the grounds of the Bundesarchivgesetz (German Archive Law). Heinrich Klemt was listed for the first time in the second edition of Von Seemen's book Die Ritterkreuzträger 1939–45—The Knight's Cross Bearers 1939–45 with a footnote: "No evidence in the German Federal Archives, presentation from the combat area Berlin". This information was later published in 1984 by Helmuth Spaeter, author of Die Geschichte des Panzerkorps Großdeutschland—The History of the Panzer Corps Großdeutschland and in 1986 by Fellgiebel.)	Heer	Hauptmann	Leader of Panzer-Pionier-Baillion II./Führer-Grenadier-Brigade	2 May 1945	—	—
Bernhard Klemz	Heer	Hauptmann	Chief of the 5./Panzer-Regiment "Großdeutschland"	4 June 1944	—	—
Friedrich Kless	Luftwaffe	Major	Gruppenkommandeur of the II./Kampfgeschwader 55	14 October 1940	—	—
Albert Klett	Waffen-SS	SS-Obersturmführer of the Reserves	Chief of the 6./SS-Kavallerie-Regiment 15 "Florian Geyer" (Note: According to Scherzer as chief of the 6./SS-Kavallerie-Regiment 15.)	16 October 1944	—	A man wearing a military uniform and neck order in the shape of a cross. His black hair is parted and his facial expression is determined.
Hans-Dietrich Klette	Luftwaffe	Major	Gruppenkommandeur of the Fernaufklärungs-Gruppe 4	5 April 1944	—	—
Nikodemus Kliemann? (Note: Nikodemus Kliemann's nomination of the Heerespersonalamt (HPA—Army Staff Office) was ready for signature but the process was never completed. The Association of Knight's Cross Recipients (AKCR) claims that the presentation was in accordance with the Dönitz-decree. This is illegal according to the Deutsche Dienststelle (WASt) and lacks legal justification. The presentation date was assigned by Walther-Peer Fellgiebel.)	Heer	Oberst	Commander of Grenadier-Regiment 410	9 May 1945	—	—
Heinz Klien	Luftwaffe	Oberleutnant	Staffelkapitän in the II./Kampfgeschwader 27 "Boelcke"	12 November 1941	—	—
Erich Klier	Heer	Oberleutnant of the Reserves	Chief of the 5./Jäger-Regiment 56	4 May 1944	—	—
Robert Klima	Heer	Leutnant of the Reserves	Leader of the 6./Grenadier-Regiment 1	10 August 1943	—	—
Helmut Klimek	Luftwaffe	Oberfeldwebel	Radio operator in the 14.(Eisenbahnbekämpfungsstaffel)/Kampfgeschwader 27 "Boelcke" (Note: According to Scherzer as radio operator in the 14.(Eisenbahnbekämpfungsstaffel/Nachtkampftauglich)/Kampfgeschwader 27 "Boelcke".)	9 June 1944	—	—
Heinrich Kling	Waffen-SS	SS-Hauptsturmführer	Chief of the 13.(schwere)/SS-Panzer-Regiment 1 "Leibstandarte SS Adolf Hitler"	23 February 1944	—	—
Fritz Klingenberg	Waffen-SS	SS-Hauptsturmführer	Chief of the 2./SS-Kradschützen-Bataillon 2 "Reich" (Note: According to Scherzer as chief of the 2./SS-Kradschützen-Bataillon of the SS-Division "Reich".)	14 May 1941	—	A smiling man wearing a military uniform, peaked cap and a neck order in the shape of a cross. His cap has an emblem in shape of a human skull and crossed bones.
Kurt Klinger	Heer	Oberleutnant	Chief of the 15.(Radfahr)/Grenadier-Regiment 89	19 January 1943	—	—
Walter Klinke	Heer	Major	Commander of the I./Grenadier-Regiment 31	30 September 1944	—	—
Friedrich Klischat	Heer	Feldwebel	Zugführer (platoon leader) in the 3./Füssilier-Regiment 27	12 March 1944	—	—
Franz Klitsch	Heer	Oberleutnant of the Reserves	Company leader in Grenadier-Regiment 120 (motorized) (Note: According to Scherzer as leader of Stabskompanie/Grenadier-Regiment (motorized) 120.)	22 January 1943	—	—
Walter Klocke	Heer	Oberstleutnant	Commander of Sturm-Regiment 215	20 April 1944	—	—
Heinrich Klöpper	Luftwaffe	Oberfeldwebel	Pilot in the 11./Jagdgeschwader 51 "Mölders"	4 September 1942	—	—
Wilhelm Klöpping	Heer	Obergefreiter	Machine gunner in the 5./Panzergrenadier-Regiment 4	15 May 1943	—	—
Hermann Kloos	Heer	Hauptmann of the Reserves	Chief of the 3.(Schützenpanzerwagen)/Panzer-Aufklärungs-Abteilung 8	13 December 1943*	Died of wounds 10 December 1943	—
Otto Klos	Heer	Hauptmann	Leader of Jäger-Regiment 41 (L)	9 December 1944	—	—
Erwin Klose	Heer	Hauptmann	Leader of the II./Jäger-Regiment 28	9 January 1945	—	—
Friedrich Klose	Heer	Unteroffizier	Gun leader in the 14.(Panzerjäger)/Infanterie-Regiment 240 (Note: According to Scherzer as gun leader in the 14./Infanterie-Regiment 240.)	20 August 1942	—	—
Helmut Klose	Heer	Oberfeldwebel	Kompanietruppführer (company headquarters leader) in the 6./Panzergrenadier-Regiment 115	16 November 1944	—	—
Paul Klose	Heer	Major of the Reserves	Commander of the I./Festungs-Grenadier-Regiment "Hauf" in the fortress Breslau	30 April 1945	—	—
Werner Klosinski	Luftwaffe	Oberstleutnant	Geschwaderkommodore of Kampfgeschwader 4 "General Wever"	9 June 1944	—	—
Karl Kloskowski+	Waffen-SS	SS-Hauptscharführer	Zugführer (platoon leader) in the 4./SS-Panzer-Regiment 2 "Das Reich" (Note: According to Scherzer as Zugführer (platoon leader) in the 4./SS-Panzer-Regiment 2.)	11 July 1943	Awarded 546th Oak Leaves 11 August 1944	A black-and-white photograph of a man wearing a camouflage military uniform, side cap and a pair of binoculars around his neck. His cap has an emblem in shape of a human skull and crossed bones.
Max Kloß	Heer	Major	Commander of the II./Gebirgsjäger-Regiment 144	26 November 1944	—	—
Ernst Klossek	Heer	Oberleutnant	Chief of the 12./Infanterie-Regiment 422	23 February 1942	—	—
Bernhard Klosterkemper	Heer	Oberst	Commander of Grenadier-Regiment 920	4 July 1944	—	—
Ludwig Klotz	Heer	Oberleutnant of the Reserves	Chief of the 9./Infanterie-Regiment 423	4 July 1940	—	—
Hans Klotzsche	Heer	Major	Commander of the I./Panzer-Artillerie-Regiment 80	28 December 1943	—	—
Wilhelm Klüber	Luftwaffe	Oberleutnant	Staffelkapitän of the 8./Sturzkampfgeschwader 1	16 April 1943	—	—
Werner Klümper	Luftwaffe	Major	Geschwaderkommodore of Kampfgeschwader 26	29 August 1943	—	—
Erich Klünder	Kriegsmarine	Korvettenkapitän	Chief of the 5. Minensuchflottille	12 August 1944	—	—
Ewald Klüser	Heer	Hauptmann	Chief of the 2./Pionier-Bataillon 12	10 February 1945	—	—
[Dr.] Max Klüver	Heer	Hauptmann of the Reserves	Commander of the I./Panzergrenadier-Regiment 40	12 October 1943	—	—
Bernd Klug+	Kriegsmarine	Kapitänleutnant	Commander of Schnellboot S-28 in the 1. Schnellbootflottille	12 March 1941	Awarded 361st Oak Leaves 1 January 1944	
Ernst Kluge	Heer	Feldwebel	Zugführer (platoon leader) in the 6./Panzergrenadier-Regiment 25	7 October 1944	—	—
Gerhard Kluge	Heer	Oberleutnant of the Reserves	Leader of the II./Grenadier-Regiment 586	9 June 1944	—	A man with glasses wearing a military uniform with an Iron Cross displayed at the front of his uniform collar.
Günther von Kluge+	Heer	General der Artillerie	Commander-in-Chief of the 4. Armee	30 September 1939	Awarded 181st Oak Leaves 18 January 1943; 40th Swords 29 October 1943	Black-and-white portrait of an older man wearing a military uniform with an Iron Cross displayed at his neck, his hair is combed back.
Waldemar Kluge	Luftwaffe	Major	Commander of the I./Fallschirm-Panzergrenadier-Regiment 2 "Hermann Göring"	2 August 1943	—	—
Wolfgang von Kluge	Heer	Generalleutnant	Commander of the 292. Infanterie-Division	29 August 1943	—	—
Hans-Jürgen Klußmann	Luftwaffe	Oberleutnant	Technical officer in the I./Schlachtgeschwader 1	9 November 1944	—	—
Bernhard Kluth	Heer	Feldwebel	Zugführer (platoon leader) in the 12./Schützen-Regiment 4	28 November 1940	—	—
Lothar Kmitta	Luftwaffe	Leutnant	Pilot in the Nahaufklärungs-Gruppe 5 (Note: According to Scherzer as pilot in the 2./Nahaufklärungs-Gruppe 5.)	18 November 1944	—	—
