= Kamecke =

Kamecke is a surname. Notable people with the surname include:

- Hans Kamecke, German Wehrmacht officer
- Theo Kamecke, American sculptor and film director
