= Hans-Joachim Kahler =

German soldier (1908–2000)

- Born: 21 March 1908
- Died: 14 January 2000 (aged 91)
- Military career
- Allegiance: Weimar Republic; Nazi Germany
- Branch: Army (Army)
- Service years: 1927–1945
- Rank: Generalmajor
- Commands: Führer Grenadier Brigade
- Conflicts: World War II: Invasion of Poland; Battle of France; Operation Barbarossa; Battle of Białystok–Minsk; Battle of Smolensk (1941); Eastern Front; Siege of Leningrad; Battle of Kursk; Battle of Smolensk (1943); Gumbinnen Operation; Battle of the Bulge
- Awards: Knight's Cross of the Iron Cross with Oak Leaves

Hans-Joachim Kahler (21 March 1908 – 14 January 2000) was a German general during World War II. He was a recipient of the Knight's Cross of the Iron Cross with Oak Leaves.

== Awards and decorations ==
- Iron Cross (1939) 2nd Class (3 July 1940) & 1st Class (3 September 1941)
- Knight's Cross of the Iron Cross with Oak Leaves
  - Knight's Cross on 14 April 1943 as Major and commander of Kradschützen-Bataillon 34
  - 355th Oak Leaves on 17 December 1943 as Oberstleutnant and commander of Panzergrenadier-Regiment 5

Military offices
Preceded by Unknown	Commander of Führer Grenadier Brigade; 10 July 1944 – 23 December 1944	Succeeded by Major von Courbière
