= 137th Infantry Division (Wehrmacht) =

- 137. Infantrie-Division
- Active: 10 October 1940 - 2 November 1943
- Country: Nazi Germany
- Branch: Army
- Type: Infantry
- Ersatz: Krumau

Insignia
- Identification symbol

The 137th Infantry Division was a major fighting formation of the German Army (Wehrmacht). It was created in October 1940, and first saw combat in Operation Barbarossa as part of Army Group Centre. The division remained on the central sector of the Eastern Front, where it participated in heavy fighting.

By November 1943, the division's losses on the Eastern Front were so high that it only consisted of two infantry regiments. This was followed by the withdrawal from the front, where the division was disbanded. The remaining troops were converted into Division Group 137.

The staff of the former division was reassigned to the 271st Infantry Division. Division Group 137 became subordinated to Korps-Abteilung E, which was also set up in November 1943, under Army Group Center.

== Commanders ==
- Generalleutnant Friedrich Bergmann 8 October 1940 – 21 December 1941;
- Oberst Siegfried Heine 21 December 1941 – 28 December 1941;
- Oberst Kurt Muhl 28 December 1941 – 5 January 1942;
- Generalmajor Hans Kamecke 5 January 1942 – 2 February 1942;
- Oberst Siegfried Heine 2 February 1942 – 12 February 1942;
- Oberst Karl Rüdiger 12 February 1942 – 25 February 1942;
- Oberst Paul Mahlmann 25 February 1942 – 1 June 1942;
- Generalleutnant Hans Kamecke 1 June 1942 – 16 October 1943;
- [Senior regimental commander] 16 October 1943 – 20 October 1943;
- Generalmajor Egon von Neindorff 20 October 1943 – 16 December 1943.

== Order of battle ==
=== 1940 ===
- Infantry Regiment 447
- Infantry Regiment 448
- Infantry Regiment 449
- Artillery Regiment 137
- Pionier-Bataillon 137
- Antitank Battalion 137
- Reconnaissance Battalion 137
- Divisions Signals-Battalion 137
- Divisions Services 137

=== 1943 ===
- Grenadier Regiment 447
- Grenadier Regiment 448
- Division Battalion 137
- Artillery Regiment 137
- Pionier-Bataillon 137
- Panzerjäger-Abteilung 137
- Feldersatz-Bataillon 137
- Divisions-Nachrichten-Abteilung 137
- Divisions-Nachschubführer 137
