= Führer Grenadier Brigade =

Elite mechanized infantry brigade of the Nazi German Army (1943-45)

Führer Grenadier Brigade (FGB)
- Divisional insignia of Großdeutschland
- Active: April 1943 - May 1945
- Country: Nazi Germany
- Branch: German Army
- Type: Mechanized Infantry
- Size: Battalion; Brigade; Division
- Part of: Created as Grenadier Battalion, expanded on paper to Grenadier Division 1945.
- Garrison/HQ: Rastenburg, East Prussia, Fallsingbostel
- Patron: Adolf Hitler
- Engagements: World War II: Gumbinnen Operation; Battle of the Bulge

Commanders
- Notable commanders: Oberst Hans-Joachim Kahler

The Führer Grenadier Brigade (formerly Führer Grenadier Battalion later Führer Grenadier Division) was an elite German Army combat unit which saw action during World War II. The Führer Grenadier Brigade is sometimes mistakenly perceived as being a part of the Waffen-SS, whereas it was actually an Army unit and technically assigned to the Großdeutschland Division. This misconception comes from its original duty of guarding Adolf Hitler's East Prussian Wolfsschanze Headquarters, a task which sounded similar to the original one of Waffen-SS 1. Panzer Division "Leibstandarte SS Adolf Hitler", which in turn stemmed from the Führer's original bodyguard corps. Fighting on both the Eastern and Western Fronts, the brigade surrendered to U.S. forces in Austria in 1945.

== Creation and Early History ==
The Führer Grenadier Battalion was raised in April 1943 to act as a second guard unit on the outer perimeter of Hitler's Wolfsschanze in Rastenburg, East Prussia.

Despite the idea of Hitler's bodyguards being drawn from the SS, a small detachment was drawn from the Wach Regiment to become Hitler's private bodyguards. This unit was called the Führer Begleit (or Führer Escort) and was to eventually be expanded to divisional size (see Führer Begleit Brigade).

== Brigade - Eastern Front ==
In 1944, the battalion was reorganized as an armored brigade at Fallingbostel. Personnel were drawn from the Großdeutschland Division pool of hand-picked personnel. In October 1944, it was assigned to XXVII Korps of the Fourth Army and sent to the vicinity of Gumbinnen. They fought at Daken and Grosswaltersdorf from October 21–23. The brigade operated in conjunction with the 5th Panzer Division and the Hermann Göring Division.

== Western Front - Wacht am Rhein ==
Between December 11–17, 1944, the brigade was sent west to participate in Operation Herbstnebel. The brigade's composition did not match any standard unit configuration. The Großdeutschland Division never fought on the western front in 1944–45 (it did see action in the 1940 campaign). As a part of Großdeutschland, FGB was permitted to wear cuff-title insignia. The Großdeutschland was ordered to wear the cuff title on the right sleeve (as did veterans of the North African campaign or the taking of Crete with their honour bands), while the SS wore theirs on the left. In 1945, the brigade was awarded its cuff title, FGB. FGB was assigned to Seventh Army Reserve for Operation Herbstnebel.

== Division - 1945 ==
The brigade was pulled from battle in early January. On paper, it was enlarged to a division and assigned to Heeresgruppe Vistula. In April, it was reassigned to the 6th Panzer Army. The Führer Grenadier Division surrendered to U.S. troops in May 1945 near Vienna, Austria.

== Commanders ==
Führer Grenadier Brigade (April 1943 – May 1945)
In work	1
In work	1
Oberst Hans-Joachim Kahler (badly wounded)	July 10, 1944 – December 23, 1944
Major von Courbière	December 1944 – January 1945
Generalmajor Hellmuth Mäder (Führer Grenadier Division)	January 26, 1945 – February 1, 1945
Generalmajor Erich von Haßenstein	February 1, 1945 – May 8, 1945

== Holders of the Knight's Cross of the Iron Cross ==
- Generalmajor Hellmuth Mäder, awarded Swords to his Knight's Cross on April 18, 1945 as Commander of the Führer Grenadier Division.

=== 101 Panzer Regiment ===
Hauptmann Herbert Hensel, Knight's Cross on March 5, 1945 as Commander of the II. Abteilung (Panzer-Füsilier-Bataillon)/Panzer-Regiment 101 (former I./PzGrenRegt 99).

=== 99 Panzergrenadier Regiment ===
Major Ernst-Günter Lehnhoff, Knight's Cross on December 12, 1944 as Commander of the Panzer-Füsilier-Bataillon of the Führer-Grenadier-Brigade (I./PzGrenRegt 99).

== Order of battle ==
Image of the Latin Script cuff title introduced in 1944. From the GD for CM website, courtesy the webmaster.

- 101 Panzer Regiment
  - 1 Companie - 12 Panthers
  - 2 Companie - 12 Panthers
  - 3 Companie - 12 Panthers
  - 4 Companie - 11 Jagdpanthers with 88mm Pak 43
  - 5 Companie - 14 Stug III
- 99 Panzergrenadier Regiment - 92 Armored Personnel Carriers
- Artillerie Regiment 'FGB'(-) - 12 - 150mm guns (10 guns on loan to Skorzeny's Panzer Brigade 150 during Herbstnebel)
- 911 Sturmgeschutz Brigade
  - 1 Companie - 10 Stug III
  - 2 Companie - 14 Stug III
  - 3 Companie - 6 Stug III
- 124 Flak Abteilung
- Kampfschule 'FGB'
- 1124 Infantriegeschutz Kompanie
- 1124 Panzerjäger Kompanie - 3 Marder III, 4 Jagdpanthers, 6 Hetzer
- 1124 Panzer Aufklärungs Kompanie
- 1124 Flak Kompanie - 26 guns
- 1124 Pionier Kompanie
- 1124 Nachrichten Abteilung
- Nachschub Truppe 'FGB'
- Werkstatt Kompanie 'FGB'
- Sanitäts Kompanie 'FGB'

== See also ==
List of German divisions in World War II

== Bibliography ==
=== Printed references ===
- Quarrie, Bruce (2001). The Ardennes Offensive, I Armee & VII Armee. Order of Battle. Vol. 12. London, UK: Osprey Publishing Group. ISBN 1-85532-913-1.
