= Hans Kamecke =

German general (1890–1943)

- Born: 18 August 1890
- Died: 16 October 1943 (aged 53)
- Military career
- Allegiance: Nazi Germany
- Branch: Army
- Service years: 1909–1920; 1935–1943
- Rank: Generalleutnant
- Commands: 137th Infantry Division
- Conflicts: World War II
- Awards: Knight's Cross of the Iron Cross

Generalleutnant Hans Kamecke (18 August 1890 – 16 October 1943) was a German Wehrmacht officer who saw service commanding the 137th Infantry Division during the Second World War. He was killed in action on 16 October 1943 near Kolpen and posthumously awarded the Knight's Cross of the Iron Cross.

== Career ==
Kamecke fought in the German Wehrmacht during the Second World War. Whilst in command of 124. Infanterie-Regiment he was awarded the German Cross in Gold on 1 December 1941. As a generalmajor Kamecke was given command of 137. Infanterie-Division on 5 January 1942, fighting in the Russian Winter campaign of 1941–1942. He relinquished command only a month later on 2 February when he was either injured or fell ill. He returned to the division on 1 June and was promoted to generalleutnant on 1 January 1943.

Kamecke commanded 137. Infanterie-Division during the Battle of Kursk and Operation Citadel later in the year. The division subsequently fought around the central Dnieper. Kamecke was returning to his headquarters from visiting the front line, south of Kolpen, when he was attacked and killed by Soviet fighter aircraft. He was posthumously awarded the Knight's Cross of the Iron Cross eleven days later. Badly understrength, after Kamecke's death 137. Infanterie-Division was withdrawn from combat and disbanded later in the year.

== Awards and decorations ==
- German Cross in Gold (1 December 1941)
- Knight's Cross of the Iron Cross (27 October 1943)

Military offices
Preceded by Kurt Muhl	Commander of 137. Infanterie-Division; 5 January 1942 – 12 February 1942	Succeeded by Karl Rüdiger
Preceded by Karl Rüdiger	Commander of 137. Infanterie-Division; 25 February 1942 – 15 October 1943	Succeeded by Egon von Neindorff
