= Operation Barbarossa =

1941 Axis invasion of the Soviet Union during WWII

- Part of the Eastern Front of World War II
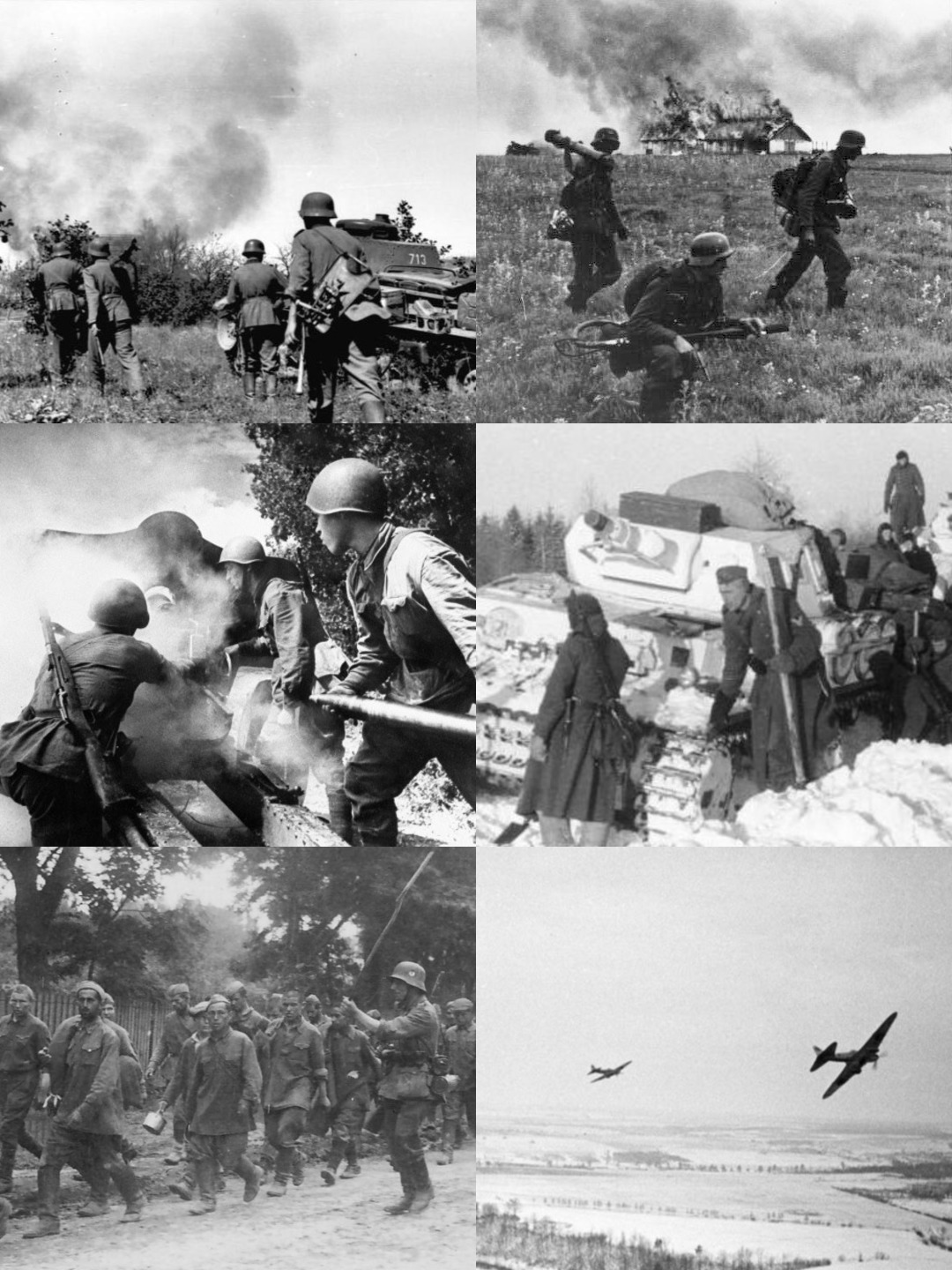
- Clockwise from top-left: German soldiers advance through northern Russia; German flamethrower crew burns down a house in the background; German Panzer IV stuck in the snow with white camouflage paint; Soviet Ilyushin Il-2s over German positions near Moscow; Soviet POWs on the way to prison camps; Soviet soldiers fire artillery
Date	22 June – 5 December 1941 (5 months and 13 days)
Location	Western Soviet Union
Result	Axis strategic failure
Territorial changes	Axis captured approximately 600,000 sq mi (1,600,000 km^{2}) of Soviet territory but failed to reach the A–A line

Belligerents
Germany (Note: Germany's allies, in total, provided a significant number of troops and material to the front. There were also numerous units under German command recruited in German-occupied Europe and sympathetic puppet or neutral states, including the Spanish Blue Division, the Legion of French Volunteers Against Bolshevism, the 369th Croatian Infantry Regiment, the Croatian Air Force Legion, and the Croatian Naval Legion.); Romania; Finland; Italy (Note: The Light Transport Brigade from Croatia was attached to the 3rd Cavalry Division "Principe Amedeo Duca d'Aosta"); Hungary; Slovakia	Soviet Union

Commanders and leaders
(Nazi Germany) Adolf Hitler; (Nazi Germany) Walther von Brauchitsch; (Nazi Germany) Hermann Göring; (Nazi Germany) Fedor von Bock; (Nazi Germany) Gerd von Rundstedt; (Nazi Germany) Wilhelm Ritter von Leeb; (Nazi Germany) Nikolaus von Falkenhorst; (Kingdom of Romania) Ion Antonescu; (Finland) C.G.E. Mannerheim	(Soviet Union) Joseph Stalin; (Soviet Union) Semyon Timoshenko; (Soviet Union) Markian Popov; (Soviet Union) Fyodor Kuznetsov; (Soviet Union) Pyotr Sobennikov; (Soviet Union) Pavel Kurochkin; (Soviet Union) Dmitry Pavlov (executed); (Soviet Union) Ivan Konev; (Soviet Union) Georgy Zhukov; (Soviet Union) Mikhail Kirponos †; (Soviet Union) Ivan Tyulenev; (Soviet Union) Yakov Cherevichenko

Units involved
Axis armies: (Nazi Germany) Army Group North; 16th Army; 18th Army; 4th Panzer Army; Luftflotte 1; (Nazi Germany) Army Group Centre; 2nd Army; 4th Army; 9th Army; 2nd Panzer Army; 3rd Panzer Army; Luftflotte 2; (Nazi Germany) Army Group South; 6th Army; 11th Army; 17th Army; 1st Panzer Army; Luftflotte 4; (Kingdom of Romania) 3rd Army; (Kingdom of Romania) 4th Army; Independent armies: (Nazi Germany) Army of Norway; (Finland) Army of Karelia	Soviet armies: (Soviet Union) Northern Front; 7th Army; 8th Army; 48th Army; 52nd Army; 54th Army; 55th Army; (Soviet Union) Northwestern Front; 11th Army; 27th Army; 34th Army; (Soviet Union) Western Front; 3rd Army; 10th Army; 13th Army; 16th Army; 19th Army; 20th Army; 22nd Army; 24th Army; 28th Army; 40th Army; 50th Army; (Soviet Union) Southwestern Front; 5th Army; 6th Army; 12th Army; 21st Army; 26th Army; 37th Army; (Soviet Union) Southern Front; 9th Army; 18th Army; Coastal Army

Strength
Frontline strength (22 June 1941): 3.8 million personnel; 3,350–3,795 tanks; 3,030–3,072 other AFVs (Note: Of the AFVs, Askey reports there were 301 assault guns, 257 tank destroyers and self-propelled guns, 1,055 armoured half-tracks, 1,367 armoured cars, 92 combat engineer and ammunition transport vehicles.); 2,770–5,369 aircraft; 7,200–23,435 artillery pieces; 17,081 mortars; 600,000 horses; 600,000 vehicles	Frontline strength (22 June 1941): 2.6–2.9 million personnel; 11,000 tanks; 7,133–9,100 military aircraft

Casualties and losses
Total military casualties: 1,000,000+ (Note: 881,788 of which are German) Breakdown: Casualties of 1941: According to German Army medical reports (including Army Norway): 186,452 killed; 40,157 missing; 655,179 wounded in action (Note: Excludes an additional 395,799 who were deemed unfit for service due to non-combat causes, transported out of their Army Group sectors for treatment, and treated in divisional/local medical facilities. 98% of those 395,799 eventually returned to active duty service, usually after relatively short treatment, meaning about 8,000 became permanent losses. Askey 2014, p. 178.); 8,000 evacuated sick; 2,827 aircraft destroyed; 2,735 tanks destroyed; 104 assault guns destroyed Other involved country losses; (Kingdom of Romania) 114,000+ casualties (at least 39,000 dead or missing); (Finland) 75,000 casualties (26,355 dead) in Karelia 5,000+ casualties during Operation Silver Fox; (Fascist Italy) 8,700 casualties; (Kingdom of Hungary (1920–1946)) 4,420 casualties (Note: 855 killed, 2,288 wounded in action, 277 missing and captured, 1,000 sick and injured)	Total military casualties: 4,500,000 Breakdown: Casualties of 1941: Based on Soviet archives: 566,852 killed in action (101,471 of whom died in hospital of wounds); 235,339 died from non-combat causes; 1,336,147 sick or wounded via combat and non-combat causes; 2,335,482 missing in action or captured; 21,200 aircraft, of which 10,600 were lost to combat; 20,500 tanks destroyed

Operation Barbarossa (Note: German: Unternehmen Barbarossa; Romanian: Operațiunea Barbarossa; Finnish: Operaatio Barbarossa; Russian: Опера́ция Барбаро́сса, romanized: Operatsiya Barbarossa) was the invasion of the Soviet Union by Nazi Germany and several of its European Axis allies starting on Sunday, 22 June 1941, during World War II. More than 3.8 million Axis troops invaded the western Soviet Union along a 2,900-kilometer (1,800 mi) front, with the main goal of capturing territory up to a line between Arkhangelsk and Astrakhan, known as the A–A line. The attack became the largest and costliest military offensive in human history, with around 10 million combatants taking part in the opening phase and over 8 million casualties by the end of the operation on 5 December 1941. It marked a major escalation of World War II, opened the Eastern Front—the largest and deadliest land war in history—and brought the Soviet Union into the Allied powers.

The operation, code-named after the Holy Roman Emperor Frederick Barbarossa ("red beard"), put into action Nazi Germany's ideological goals of eradicating communism and conquering the western Soviet Union to repopulate it with Germans under Generalplan Ost, which planned for the removal of the native Slavic peoples by mass deportation to Siberia, Germanisation, enslavement, and genocide. The material targets of the invasion were the agricultural and mineral resources of territories such as Ukraine and Byelorussia and oil fields in the Caucasus. The Axis eventually captured five million Soviet Red Army troops on the Eastern Front and deliberately starved to death or otherwise killed 3.3 million prisoners of war, as well as millions of civilians. Mass shootings and gassing operations, carried out by German paramilitary death squads and collaborators, (Note: See for instance the involvement of Latvian and Ukrainian forces in killing Jews cited by historian Raul Hilberg.) murdered over a million Soviet Jews as part of the Holocaust.

In the two years leading up to the invasion, Nazi Germany and the Soviet Union signed political and economic pacts for strategic purposes. Following the Soviet occupation of Bessarabia and Northern Bukovina in July 1940, the German High Command began planning an invasion of the country, which was approved by Adolf Hitler in December. In early 1941, Soviet leader Joseph Stalin, despite receiving intelligence about an imminent attack, did not order a mobilization of the Red Army, fearing that it might provoke Germany. As a result, Soviet forces were largely caught unprepared when the invasion began, with many units positioned poorly and understrength.

The invasion began on 22 June 1941 with a massive ground and air assault. The main part of Army Group South invaded from occupied Poland on 22 June, and on 2 July was joined by a combination of German and Romanian forces attacking from Romania. Kiev was captured on 19 September, which was followed by the captures of Kharkov on 24 October and Rostov-on-Don on 20 November, by which time most of Crimea had been captured and Sevastopol put under siege. Army Group North overran the Baltic lands, and on 8 September 1941 began a siege of Leningrad with Finnish forces that ultimately lasted until 1944. Army Group Centre, the strongest of the three groups, captured Smolensk in late July 1941 before beginning a drive on Moscow on 2 October. Facing logistical problems with supply, slowed by muddy terrain, not fully outfitted for Russia's brutal winter, and coping with determined Soviet resistance, Army Group Centre's offensive stalled at the city's outskirts by 5 December, at which point the Soviets began a major counteroffensive.

The failure of Operation Barbarossa reversed the fortunes of Nazi Germany. Operationally, it achieved significant victories and occupied some of the most important economic regions of the Soviet Union, captured millions of prisoners, and inflicted heavy casualties. The German high command anticipated a quick collapse of resistance as in the invasion of Poland, but instead the Red Army absorbed the German Wehrmacht's strongest blows and bogged it down in a war of attrition for which Germany was unprepared. Following the heavy losses and logistical strain of Barbarossa, German forces mounted subsequent offensives on a much narrower front—such as Case Blue in 1942 and Operation Citadel in 1943—both of which ultimately failed.

== Background ==
=== Naming ===
The theme of Barbarossa had long been used by the Nazi Party as part of their political imagery, though this was really a continuation of the glorification of the famous Crusader king by German nationalists since the 19th century. According to a Germanic medieval legend, revived in the 19th century by the nationalistic tropes of German Romanticism, the Holy Roman Emperor Frederick Barbarossa—who drowned in Asia Minor while leading the Third Crusade—was not dead but asleep, along with his knights, in a cave in the Kyffhäuser mountains in Thuringia, and would awaken in the hour of Germany's greatest need and restore the nation to its former glory. Originally, the invasion of the Soviet Union was codenamed Operation Otto (alluding to Holy Roman Emperor Otto the Great's expansive campaigns in Eastern Europe), but Hitler had the name changed to Operation Barbarossa in December 1940. Hitler had in July 1937 praised Barbarossa as the emperor who first expressed Germanic cultural ideas and carried them to the outside world through his imperial mission. For Hitler, the name Barbarossa signified his belief that the conquest of the Soviet Union would usher in the Nazi "Thousand-Year Reich".

=== Racial policies of Nazi Germany ===
As early as 1925, Adolf Hitler vaguely declared in his political manifesto and autobiography Mein Kampf that he would invade the Soviet Union, asserting that the German people needed to secure Lebensraum ('living space') in which to thrive for generations to come. On 10 February 1939, Hitler told his army commanders that the next war would be "purely a war of Weltanschauungen ['worldviews']... totally a war of peoples, a racial war". On 23 November, once World War II had already started, Hitler declared that "racial war has broken out and this war shall determine who shall govern Europe, and with it, the world". The racial policy of Nazi Germany portrayed the Soviet Union (and all of Eastern Europe) as populated by non-Aryan Untermenschen ('sub-humans'), ruled by Jewish Bolshevik conspirators. Hitler claimed in Mein Kampf that Germany's destiny was to follow the Drang nach Osten ('drive to the East') as it did "600 years ago" (see Ostsiedlung). Accordingly, it was a partially secret but well-documented Nazi policy to kill, deport, or enslave the majority of Russian and other Slavic populations and repopulate the land west of the Urals with Germanic peoples, under Generalplan Ost (General Plan for the East). The Nazis' belief in their ethnic superiority pervades official records and pseudoscientific articles in German periodicals, on topics such as "how to deal with alien populations."

Plan of new German settlement colonies (marked with dots and diamonds), drawn up by the Friedrich Wilhelm University Institute of Agriculture in Berlin, 1942

While older postwar histories tended to emphasize the myth of the "clean Wehrmacht", upholding its honor in the face of Hitler's fanaticism, historian Jürgen Förster notes that "In fact, the military commanders were caught up in the ideological character of the conflict, and involved in its implementation as willing participants". Before and during the invasion of the Soviet Union, German troops were indoctrinated with anti-Bolshevik, anti-Semitic and anti-Slavic ideology via movies, radio, lectures, books, and leaflets. Likening the Soviets to the forces of Genghis Khan, Hitler told the Croatian military leader Slavko Kvaternik that the "Mongolian race" threatened Europe. Following the invasion, many Wehrmacht officers told their soldiers to target "Jewish Bolshevik subhumans", the "Mongol hordes", the "Asiatic flood" and the "Red beast". Nazi propaganda portrayed the war against the Soviet Union as an ideological war between German National Socialism and Jewish Bolshevism and a racial war between the disciplined Germans and the Jewish, Romani and Slavic Untermenschen. An 'order from the Führer' stated that the paramilitary SS Einsatzgruppen, which closely followed the Wehrmacht's advance, were to execute all Soviet functionaries who were "less valuable Asiatics, Gypsies and Jews." Six months into the invasion of the Soviet Union, the Einsatzgruppen had murdered more than 500,000 Soviet Jews, a figure greater than the number of Red Army soldiers killed in battle by then. German army commanders cast Jews as the major cause behind the "partisan struggle". The main view of German troops was "[w]here there's a partisan, there's a Jew, and where there's a Jew, there's a partisan", or "[t]he partisan is where the Jew is." Many of them also saw the war in racial terms, and regarded their Soviet enemies as sub-human.

After the war began, the Nazis issued a ban on sexual relations between Germans and foreign slaves. There were regulations enacted against the Ost-Arbeiter ('Eastern workers') that included the death penalty for sexual relations with a German. Heinrich Himmler, in his secret memorandum, Reflections on the Treatment of Peoples of Alien Races in the East (dated 25 May 1940), outlined the Nazi plans for the non-German populations in the East. Himmler believed the Germanisation process in Eastern Europe would be complete when "in the East dwell only men with truly German, Germanic blood."

The Nazi secret plan Generalplan Ost, prepared in 1941 and confirmed in 1942, called for a "new order of ethnographical relations" in the territories occupied by Nazi Germany in Eastern Europe. It envisaged ethnic cleansing, executions and enslavement of the populations of conquered countries, with very small percentages undergoing Germanisation, expulsion into the depths of Russia or other fates, while the conquered territories would be Germanised. The plan had two parts, the Kleine Planung ('small plan'), which covered actions to be taken during the war and the Große Planung ('large plan'), which covered policies after the war was won, to be implemented gradually over 25 to 30 years.

A speech given by General Erich Hoepner demonstrates the character of the Nazi racial plan, as he informed the 4th Panzer Group that the war against the Soviet Union was "an essential part of the German people's struggle for existence" (Daseinskampf), also referring to the imminent battle as the "old struggle of Germans against Slavs" and even stated, "the struggle must aim at the annihilation of today's Russia and must, therefore, be waged with unparalleled harshness." Hoepner also added that the Germans were fighting for "the defence of European culture against Moscovite–Asiatic inundation, and the repulse of Jewish Bolshevism ... No adherents of the present Russian-Bolshevik system are to be spared." Walther von Brauchitsch also told his subordinates that troops should view the war as a "struggle between two different races and [should] act with the necessary severity." Racial motivations were central to Nazi ideology and played a key role in planning for Operation Barbarossa since both Jews and communists were considered equivalent enemies of the Nazi state. Nazi imperialist ambitions rejected the common humanity of both groups, declaring the supreme struggle for Lebensraum to be a Vernichtungskrieg ('war of annihilation').

=== German-Soviet relations of 1939–40 ===
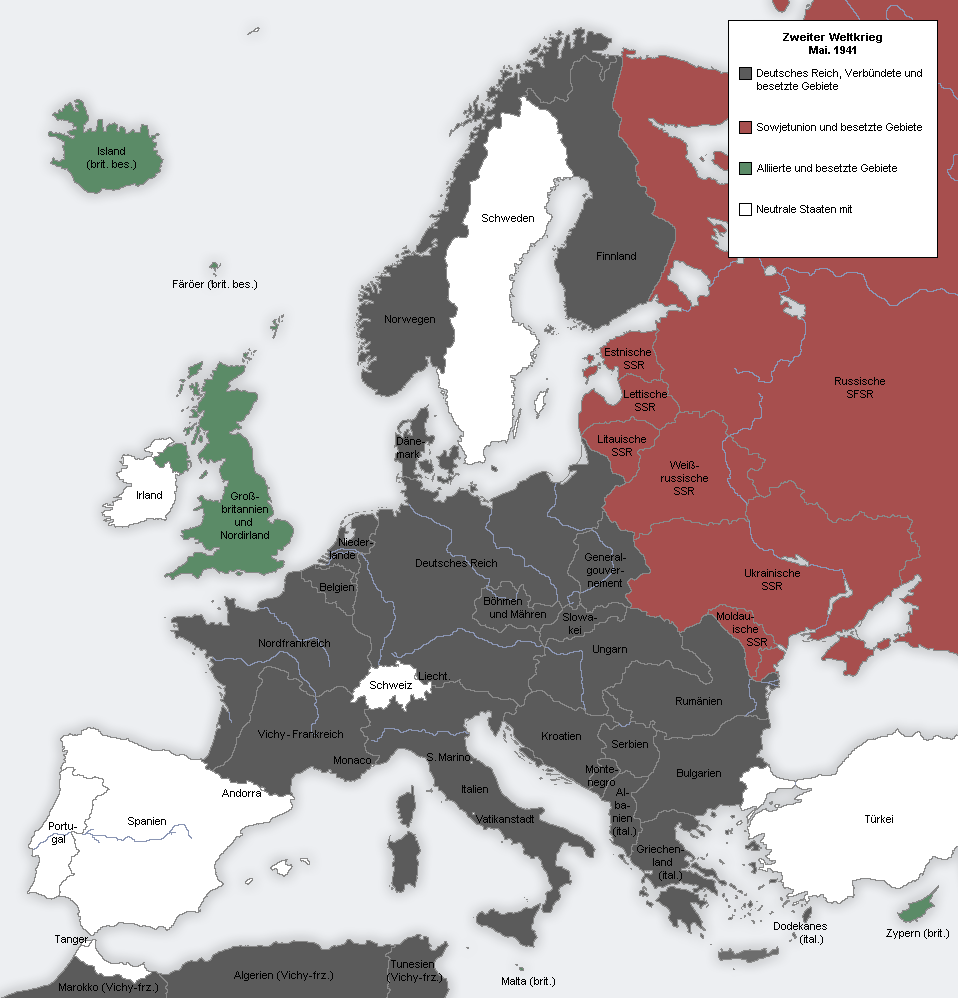
The geopolitical disposition of Europe in 1941, immediately before the start of Operation Barbarossa. The grey area represents Nazi Germany, its allies, and countries under its control.

On August 23, 1939, Germany and the Soviet Union signed a non-aggression pact in Moscow known as the Molotov–Ribbentrop Pact. A secret protocol to the pact outlined an agreement between Germany and the Soviet Union on the division of the eastern European border states between their respective "spheres of influence", Soviet Union and Germany would partition Poland in the event of an invasion by Germany, and the Soviets would be allowed to overrun Finland, Estonia, Latvia and the region of Bessarabia. The rest of the world learned of this pact later the same day, but were unaware of the provisions to partition Poland. The pact stunned the world because of the parties' earlier mutual hostility and their conflicting ideologies. The conclusion of this pact was followed by the German invasion of Poland on 1 September that triggered the outbreak of World War II in Europe, then the Soviet invasion of Poland that led to the annexation of the eastern part of the country. As a result of the pact, Germany and the Soviet Union maintained reasonably strong diplomatic relations for two years and fostered an important economic relationship. The countries entered a trade pact in 1940 by which the Soviets received German military equipment and trade goods in exchange for raw materials, such as oil and wheat, to help the German war effort by circumventing the British blockade of Germany.

Despite the parties' ostensibly cordial relations, each side was highly suspicious of the other's intentions. For instance, the Soviet invasion of Bukovina in June 1940 went beyond their sphere of influence as agreed with Germany. After Germany entered the Axis Pact with Japan and Italy, it began negotiations about a potential Soviet entry into the pact. After two days of negotiations in Berlin from 12 to 14 November 1940, Ribbentrop presented a draft treaty for a Soviet entry into the Axis. However, Hitler had no intention of allowing the Soviet Union into the Axis and in an order stated, "Political conversations designed to clarify the attitude of Russia in the immediate future have been started. Regardless of the outcome of these conversations, all preparations for the East previously ordered orally are to be continued. [Written] directives on that will follow as soon as the basic elements of the army's plan for the operation have been submitted to me and approved by me." There would be no "long-term agreement with Russia" given that the Nazis intended to go to war with them; but the Soviets approached the negotiations differently and were willing to make huge economic concessions to secure a relationship under general terms acceptable to the Germans just a year before. On 25 November 1940, the Soviet Union offered a written counter-proposal to join the Axis if Germany would agree to refrain from interference in the Soviet Union's sphere of influence, but Germany did not respond. As both sides began colliding with each other in Eastern Europe, conflict appeared more likely, although they did sign a border and commercial agreement addressing several open issues in January 1941. According to historian Robert Service, Joseph Stalin was convinced that the overall military strength of the Soviet Union was such that he had nothing to fear and anticipated an easy victory should Germany attack; moreover, Stalin believed that since the Germans were still fighting the British in the west, Hitler would be unlikely to open up a two-front war and subsequently delayed the reconstruction of defensive fortifications in the border regions. When German soldiers swam across the Bug River to warn the Red Army of an impending attack, they were shot as enemy agents. Some historians believe that Stalin, despite providing an amicable front to Hitler, did not wish to remain allies with Germany. Rather, Stalin might have had intentions to break off from Germany and proceed with his own campaign against Germany to be followed by one against the rest of Europe. Other historians contend that Stalin did not plan for such an attack in June 1941, given the perilous state of the Red Army at the time of the invasion.

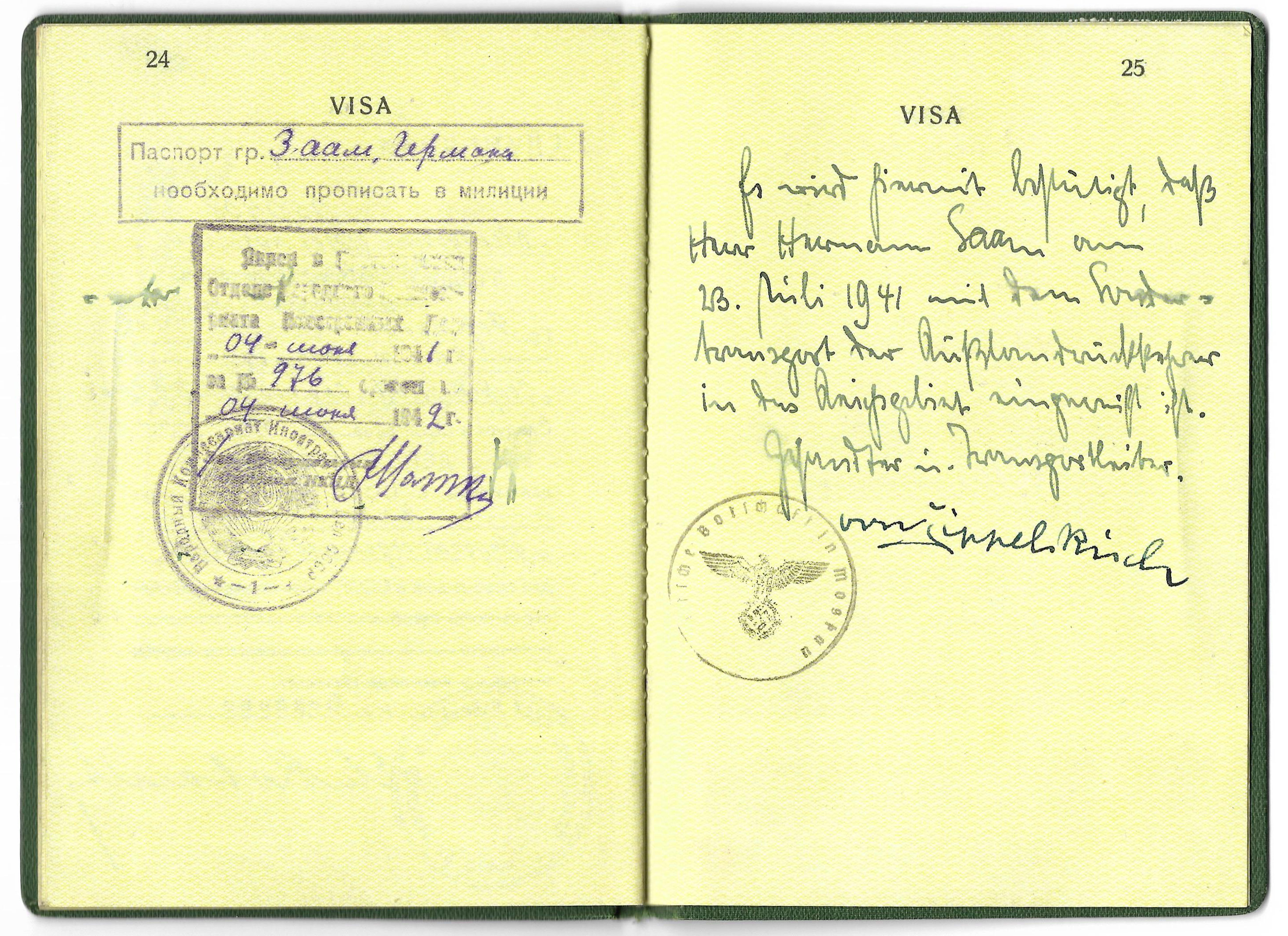
1939 German Diplomatic passport with its holder returning after the outbreak of war two years later and being evacuated on a special train out of the USSR.

=== Axis invasion plans ===
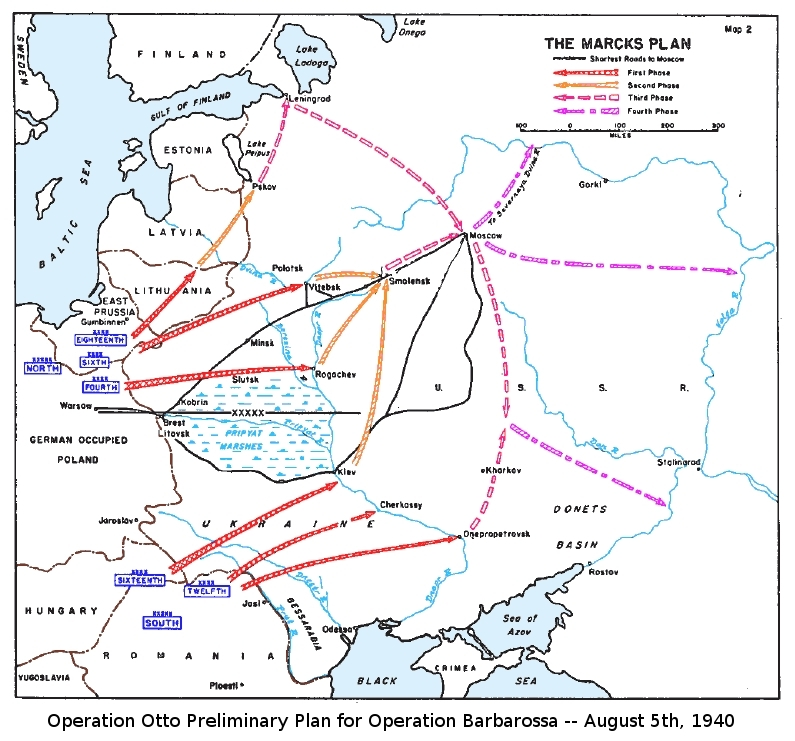
The Marcks Plan was the original German plan of attack for Operation Barbarossa, as depicted in a US Government study (March 1955).

Stalin's reputation as a brutal dictator contributed both to the Nazis' justification of their assault and to their expectations of success, as Stalin's Great Purge of the 1930s had executed many competent and experienced military officers, leaving Red Army leadership weaker than their German adversary. The Nazis often emphasized the Soviet regime's brutality when targeting the Slavs with propaganda. They also claimed that the Red Army was preparing to attack the Germans, and their own invasion was thus presented as a pre-emptive strike.

Hitler also utilised the rising tension between the Soviet Union and Germany over territories in the Balkans as one of the pretexts for the invasion. While no concrete plans had yet been made, Hitler told one of his generals in June 1940 that the victories in Western Europe finally freed his hands for a "final showdown" with Bolshevism. With the successful end to the campaign in France, General Erich Marcks was assigned the task of drawing up the initial invasion plans of the Soviet Union. The first battle plans were entitled Operation Draft East (colloquially known as the Marcks Plan). His report advocated the A–A line as the operational objective of any invasion of the Soviet Union. This assault would extend from the northern city of Arkhangelsk on the Arctic Sea through Gorky and Rostov to the port city of Astrakhan at the mouth of the Volga on the Caspian Sea. The report concluded that—once established—this military border would reduce the threat to Germany from attacks by enemy bombers.

Although Hitler was warned by many high-ranking military officers, such as Friedrich Paulus, that occupying Western Russia would create "more of a drain than a relief for Germany's economic situation," he anticipated compensatory benefits such as the demobilisation of entire divisions to relieve the acute labour shortage in German industry, the exploitation of Ukraine as a reliable and immense source of agricultural products, the use of forced labour to stimulate Germany's overall economy and the expansion of territory to improve Germany's efforts to isolate the United Kingdom. Hitler was further convinced that Britain would sue for peace once the Germans triumphed in the Soviet Union, and if they did not, he would use the resources gained in the East to defeat the British Empire.

We only have to kick in the door and the whole rotten structure will come crashing down.

— Adolf Hitler

Hitler received the final military plans for the invasion on 5 December 1940, which the German High Command had been working on since July 1940, under the codename "Operation Otto". Upon reviewing the plans, Hitler formally committed Germany to the invasion when he issued Führer Directive 21 on 18 December 1940, where he outlined the precise manner in which the operation was to be carried out. Hitler also renamed the operation to Barbarossa in honor of medieval Emperor Friedrich I of the Holy Roman Empire, a leader of the Third Crusade in the 12th century. The Barbarossa Decree, issued by Hitler on 30 March 1941, supplemented the Directive by decreeing that the war against the Soviet Union would be one of annihilation and legally sanctioned the eradication of all Communist political leaders and intellectual elites in Eastern Europe. The invasion was tentatively set for May 1941.

According to a 1978 essay by German historian Andreas Hillgruber, the invasion plans drawn up by the German military elite were substantially coloured by hubris, stemming from the rapid defeat of France at the hands of the "invincible" Wehrmacht and by traditional German stereotypes of Russia as a primitive, backward "Asiatic" country. (Note: It is additionally important that considerable portions of the German General Staff thought of Russia as a "colossus of clay" which was "politically unstable, filled with discontented minorities, ineffectively ruled, and militarily weak.") Red Army soldiers were considered brave and tough, but the officer corps was held in contempt. The leadership of the Wehrmacht paid little attention to politics, culture, and the considerable industrial capacity of the Soviet Union, in favour of a very narrow military view. Hillgruber argued that because these assumptions were shared by the entire military elite, Hitler was able to push through with a "war of annihilation" that would be waged in the most inhumane fashion possible with the complicity of "several military leaders", even though it was quite clear that this would be in violation of all accepted norms of warfare.

Even so, in autumn 1940, some high-ranking German military officials drafted a memorandum to Hitler on the dangers of an invasion of the Soviet Union. They argued that the eastern territories (Ukrainian Soviet Socialist Republic, the Byelorussian Soviet Socialist Republic, the Estonian Soviet Socialist Republic, the Latvian Soviet Socialist Republic, and the Lithuanian Soviet Socialist Republic) would only end up as a further economic burden for Germany. It was further argued that the Soviets, in their current bureaucratic form, were harmless and that the occupation would not benefit Germany politically either. Hitler, solely focused on his ultimate ideological goal of eliminating the Soviet Union and Communism, disagreed with economists about the risks and told Reichsmarschall Hermann Göring that he would no longer listen to misgivings about the economic dangers of a war with the USSR. It is speculated that this was passed on to General Georg Thomas, who had produced reports that predicted a net economic drain for Germany in the event of an invasion of the Soviet Union unless its economy was captured intact and the Caucasus oilfields seized in the first blow; Thomas revised his future report to fit Hitler's wishes. The Red Army's ineptitude in the Winter War against Finland in 1939–40 also convinced Hitler of a quick victory within a few months. (Note: During the war between the Soviet Union and Finland, 87,507 Soviet troops were killed, another 39,369 were missing-in-action, and some 5,000 had been captured; whereas the Finns experienced less than half these losses.) Neither Hitler nor the General Staff anticipated a long campaign lasting into the winter, and therefore adequate preparations, such as the distribution of warm clothing and winterisation of important military equipment like tanks and artillery, were not made.

Further to Hitler's Directive, Göring's Green Folder, issued in March 1941, laid out the agenda for the next step after the anticipated quick conquest of the Soviet Union. The Hunger Plan outlined how entire urban populations of conquered territories were to be starved to death, (Note: This systematic plan was developed by officials within the Reich Ministry of Food, the Wehrwirtschaftsamt, and the Wehrmacht's Quartermaster General's office in spring 1941.) thus creating an agricultural surplus to feed Germany and urban space for the German upper class. This genocidal strategy aimed to redirect agricultural resources from the Soviet Union to Germany by cutting off food to vast regions—particularly central and northern Russia—resulting in the intentional starvation of millions. These policies were modified by late 1941 when the original plan proved logistically untenable. Nevertheless, the strategy of feeding only those civilians deemed economically useful continued, leading to mass deaths in urban centres like Leningrad, Kharkov, and Kiev.

To this end, Nazi policy aimed to destroy the Soviet Union as a political entity in accordance with the geopolitical Lebensraum ideals for the benefit of future generations of the "Nordic master race". In 1941, Nazi ideologue Alfred Rosenberg—later appointed Reich Minister of the Occupied Eastern Territories—suggested that conquered Soviet territory should be administered in the following Reichskommissariate ('Reich Commissionerships'):

Administrative subdivisions of conquered Soviet territory as envisaged, and then partially realised, by Alfred Rosenberg
Name	Note	Map
Reichskommissariat Ostland	Baltic countries and Belarus	
Reichskommissariat Ukraine	Ukraine, enlarged eastwards to the Volga	
Reichskommissariat Kaukasien	Southern Russia and the Caucasus region	Unrealised
Reichskommissariat Moskowien	Moscow metropolitan area and remaining European Russia; originally called Reichskommissariat Russland, later renamed	Unrealised
Reichskommissariat Turkestan	Central Asian republics and territories	Unrealised

German military planners also researched Napoleon's failed invasion of Russia. In their calculations, they concluded that there was little danger of a large-scale retreat of the Red Army into the Russian interior, as it could not afford to give up the Baltic countries, Ukraine, or the Moscow and Leningrad regions, all of which were vital to the Red Army for supply reasons and would thus have to be defended. Hitler and his generals disagreed on where Germany should focus its energy. Hitler, in many discussions with his generals, repeated his order of "Leningrad (Saint Petersburg) first, the Donbas second, Moscow third;" but he consistently emphasized the destruction of the Red Army over the achievement of specific terrain objectives. Hitler believed Moscow to be of "no great importance" in the defeat of the Soviet Union (Note: Concerning this strategic mistake, historian David Stone asserts that, "If Hitler's decision to invade Russia in 1941 was his greatest single error of judgement, then his subsequent decision not to strike hard and fast against Moscow was surely a close second.") and instead believed victory would come with the destruction of the Red Army west of the capital, especially west of the Western Dvina and Dnieper rivers, and this pervaded the plan for Barbarossa. This belief later led to disputes between Hitler and several German senior officers, including Heinz Guderian, Gerhard Engel, Fedor von Bock and Franz Halder, who believed the decisive victory could only be delivered at Moscow. They were unable to sway Hitler, who had grown overconfident in his own military judgment as a result of the rapid successes in Western Europe.

== German preparations ==
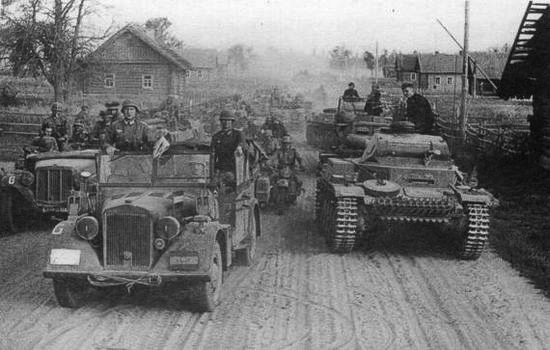
Elements of the German 3rd Panzer Army on the road near Pruzhany, June 1941

The Germans had begun massing troops near the Soviet border even before the campaign in the Balkans had finished. By the third week of February 1941, 680,000 German soldiers were gathered in assembly areas on the Romanian-Soviet border. In preparation for the attack, Hitler had secretly moved upwards of 3 million German troops and approximately 690,000 Axis soldiers to the Soviet border regions. Additional Luftwaffe operations included numerous aerial surveillance missions over Soviet territory many months before the attack.

Although the Soviet High Command was alarmed by this, Stalin's belief that Nazi Germany was unlikely to attack only two years after signing the Molotov–Ribbentrop Pact resulted in slow Soviet preparation. This fact aside, the Soviets did not entirely overlook the threat of their German neighbor. Well before the German invasion, Marshal Semyon Timoshenko referred to the Germans as the Soviet Union's "most important and strongest enemy", and as early as July 1940, the Red Army Chief of Staff, Boris Shaposhnikov, produced a preliminary three-pronged plan of attack for what a German invasion might look like, remarkably similar to the actual attack. Since April 1941, the Germans had begun setting up Operation Haifisch and Operation Harpune to substantiate their claims that Britain was the real target. These simulated preparations in Norway and the English Channel coast included activities such as ship concentrations, reconnaissance flights and training exercises.

The reasons for the postponement of Barbarossa from the initially planned date of 15 May to the actual invasion date of 22 June 1941 (a 38-day delay) are debated. The reason most commonly cited is the unforeseen contingency of invading Yugoslavia and Greece on 6 April 1941 until June 1941. Historian Thomas B. Buell indicates that Finland and Romania, which were not involved in initial German planning, needed additional time to prepare to participate in the invasion. Buell adds that an unusually wet winter kept rivers at full flood until late spring. (Note: Flooding was so bad that Guderian wrote: "The Balkans Campaign had been concluded with all the speed desired, and the troops there engaged which were now needed for Russia were withdrawn according to plan and very fast. But all the same there was a definite delay in the opening of our Russian Campaign. Furthermore we had had a very wet spring; the Bug and its tributaries were at flood level until well into May and the nearby ground was swampy and almost impassable.") The floods may have discouraged an earlier attack, even if they occurred before the end of the Balkans Campaign. (Note: Guderian wrote: "A delay was almost certainly inevitable given that the late spring thaw had swelled and in some cases flooded the major waterways, impeding mobile operations over the sodden ground." Blumentritt: "... the ground was soft and boggy and the roads were covered with mud. Normally May brought a change of conditions; the water receded and movement was less hampered. But 1941 was an exceptional year, and at the end of June the Bug, a Polish river near Brest-Litovsk, was still overflowing its banks.")

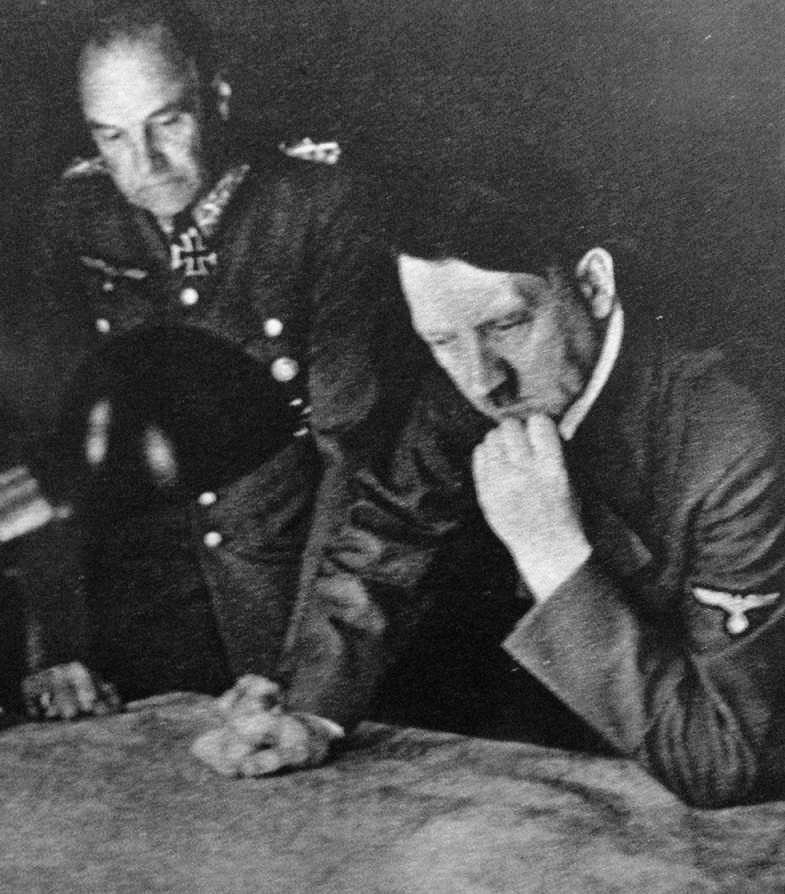
OKH commander, Field Marshal Walther von Brauchitsch, and Hitler study maps during the early days of Hitler's Soviet campaign

The importance of the delay is still debated. William Shirer argued that Hitler's Balkan Campaign had delayed the commencement of Barbarossa by several weeks and thereby jeopardised it. Many later historians argue that the 22 June start date was sufficient for the German offensive to reach Moscow by September. Antony Beevor wrote in 2012 about the delay caused by German attacks in the Balkans that "most [historians] accept that it made little difference" to the eventual outcome of Barbarossa.

The Germans deployed one independent regiment, one separate motorised training brigade and 153 divisions for Barbarossa, which included 104 infantry, 19 panzer and 15 motorised infantry divisions in three army groups, nine security divisions to operate in conquered territories, four divisions in Finland (Note: For the Finnish President, Risto Ryti, the attack against the Soviet Union was part of the struggle against Bolshevism and one of Finland's "traditional enemies".) and two divisions as reserve under the direct control of OKH. These were equipped with 6,867 armoured vehicles, of which 3,350–3,795 were tanks, 2,770–4,389 aircraft (that amounted to 65 percent of the Luftwaffe), 7,200–23,435 artillery pieces, 17,081 mortars, about 600,000 motor vehicles and 625,000–700,000 horses. Finland slated 14 divisions for the invasion, and Romania offered 13 divisions and eight brigades over the course of Barbarossa. The entire Axis forces, 3.8 million personnel, deployed across a front extending from the Arctic Ocean southward to the Black Sea, were all controlled by the OKH and organised into Army Norway, Army Group North, Army Group Centre and Army Group South, alongside three Luftflotten (air fleets, the air force equivalent of army groups) that supported the army groups: Luftflotte 1 for North, Luftflotte 2 for Centre and Luftflotte 4 for South.

Army Norway was to operate in far northern Scandinavia and bordering Soviet territories. Army Group North was to march through Latvia and Estonia into northern Russia, then either take or destroy the city of Leningrad, and link up with Finnish forces. Army Group Centre, the army group equipped with the most armour and air power, was to strike from Poland into Belorussia and the west-central regions of Russia proper, and advance to Smolensk and then Moscow. Army Group South was to strike the heavily populated and agricultural heartland of Ukraine, taking Kiev before continuing eastward over the steppes of southern USSR to the Volga with the aim of controlling the oil-rich Caucasus. Army Group South was deployed in two sections separated by a 198-mile (319 km) gap. The northern section, which contained the army group's only panzer group, was in southern Poland right next to Army Group Centre, and the southern section was in Romania.

The German forces in the rear (mostly Waffen-SS and Einsatzgruppen units) were to operate in conquered territories to counter any partisan activity in areas they controlled, as well as to execute captured Soviet political commissars and Jews. (Note: By the summer of 1941, formations of the Kommandostab Reichsführer-SS, comprising Waffen-SS brigades, were deployed alongside the Wehrmacht in the occupied Soviet territories. These units were not merely security forces but actively participated in early Holocaust massacres, including mass shootings of Jews and other targeted groups. Their operations were part of a broader SS strategy to cleanse occupied regions, revealing the Waffen-SS's deep entanglement with the machinery of genocide. Far from being a purely military organization, the Waffen-SS maintained deep institutional and personnel ties to the broader SS apparatus, including the concentration camp system. Many members rotated between front-line service and roles in the administration or guarding of camps, especially from 1942 onward. This undermines the myth of a strict separation between the Waffen-SS and the perpetration of Nazi atrocities.) On 17 June, Reich Security Main Office (RSHA) chief Reinhard Heydrich briefed around thirty to fifty Einsatzgruppen commanders on "the policy of eliminating Jews in Soviet territories, at least in general terms". While the Einsatzgruppen were assigned to the Wehrmacht's units, which provided them with supplies such as gasoline and food, they were controlled by the RSHA. The official plan for Barbarossa assumed that the army groups would be able to advance freely to their primary objectives simultaneously, without spreading thin, once they had won the border battles and destroyed the Red Army's forces in the border area.

== Soviet preparations ==
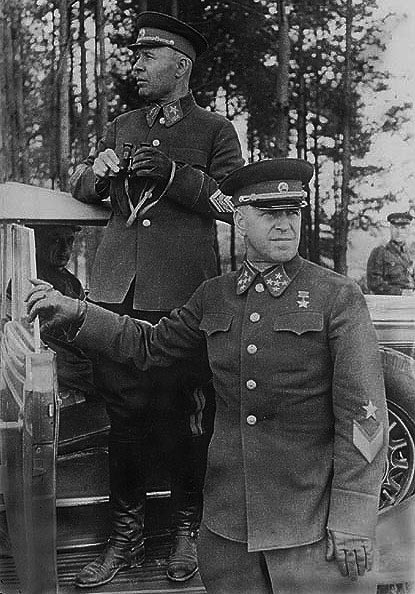
Semyon Timoshenko and Georgy Zhukov in 1940

In 1930, Mikhail Tukhachevsky, a prominent military theorist in tank warfare in the interwar period and later Marshal of the Soviet Union, forwarded a memo to the Kremlin that lobbied for colossal investment in the resources required for the mass production of weapons, pressing the case for "40,000 aircraft and 50,000 tanks". In the early 1930s, a modern operational doctrine for the Red Army was developed and promulgated in the 1936 Field Regulations in the form of the Deep Battle Concept. Defence expenditure also grew rapidly from just 12 percent of the gross national product in 1933 to 18 percent by 1940.

During Joseph Stalin's Great Purge in the late 1930s, which had not ended by the time of the German invasion on 22 June 1941, much of the officer corps of the Red Army was executed or imprisoned. Many of their replacements, appointed by Stalin for political reasons, lacked military competence. Of the five Marshals of the Soviet Union appointed in 1935, only Kliment Voroshilov and Semyon Budyonny survived Stalin's purge. Tukhachevsky was killed in 1937. Fifteen of 16 army commanders, 50 of the 57 corps commanders, 154 of the 186 divisional commanders, and 401 of 456 colonels were killed, and many other officers were dismissed. In total, about 30,000 Red Army personnel were executed.

Stalin further underscored his control by reasserting the role of political commissars at the divisional level and below to oversee the political loyalty of the army to the regime. The commissars held a position equal to that of the commander of the unit they were overseeing but in spite of efforts to ensure the political subservience of the armed forces, in the wake of Red Army's poor performance in Poland and in the Winter War, about 80 percent of the officers dismissed during the Great Purge were reinstated by 1941. Also, between January 1939 and May 1941, 161 new divisions were activated. Therefore, although about 75 percent of all the officers had been in their position for less than one year at the start of the German invasion of 1941, many of the short tenures can be attributed not only to the purge but also to the rapid increase in the creation of military units. (Note: Despite Stalin's purge of military personnel during 1937–1938, Russia developed its military-industrial complex to the degree that it was producing 2,500 tanks, 10,000 artillery pieces, and 8,000 aircraft per year. Even Soviet foreign minister Molotov later wrote in his memoir that the growth of Russia's military industry before the war "could not possibly have been greater!")

Beginning in July 1940, the Red Army General Staff developed war plans that identified the Wehrmacht as the most dangerous threat to the Soviet Union, and that in the case of a war with Germany, the Wehrmacht's main attack would come through the region north of the Pripyat Marshes into Belorussia, which later proved to be correct. Stalin disagreed, and in October, he authorised the development of new plans that assumed a German attack would focus on the region south of Pripyat Marshes towards the economically vital regions in Ukraine. This became the basis for all subsequent Soviet war plans and the deployment of their armed forces in preparation for the German invasion.

In the Soviet Union, speaking to his generals in December 1940, Stalin mentioned Hitler's references to an attack on the Soviet Union in Mein Kampf and Hitler's belief that the Red Army would need four years to ready itself. Stalin declared "we must be ready much earlier" and "we will try to delay the war for another two years". As early as August 1940, British intelligence had received hints of German plans to attack the Soviets a week after Hitler informally approved the plans for Barbarossa and warned the Soviet Union accordingly. Some of this intelligence was based on Ultra information obtained from deciphered Enigma traffic, which was relayed to Stalin by Andrei Vyshinsky, deputy commissar for foreign affairs, via letter from Winston Churchill. However, Stalin's distrust of the British led him to ignore their warnings in the belief that they were a trick designed to bring the Soviet Union into the war on their side. Soviet intelligence officers also received word of an invasion around 20 June from Mao Zedong whose spy, Yan Baohang, had overheard talk of the plans at a dinner with a German military attaché and sent word to Zhou Enlai. The Chinese maintain the tipoff helped Stalin make preparations, though little exists to confirm the Soviets made any real changes upon receiving the intelligence. In early 1941, Stalin's own intelligence services and American intelligence gave regular and repeated warnings of an impending German attack. Soviet spy Richard Sorge also gave Stalin the exact German launch date, but Sorge and other informers had previously given different invasion dates that passed peacefully before the actual invasion. Stalin acknowledged the possibility of an attack in general and therefore made significant preparations, but decided not to run the risk of provoking Hitler.

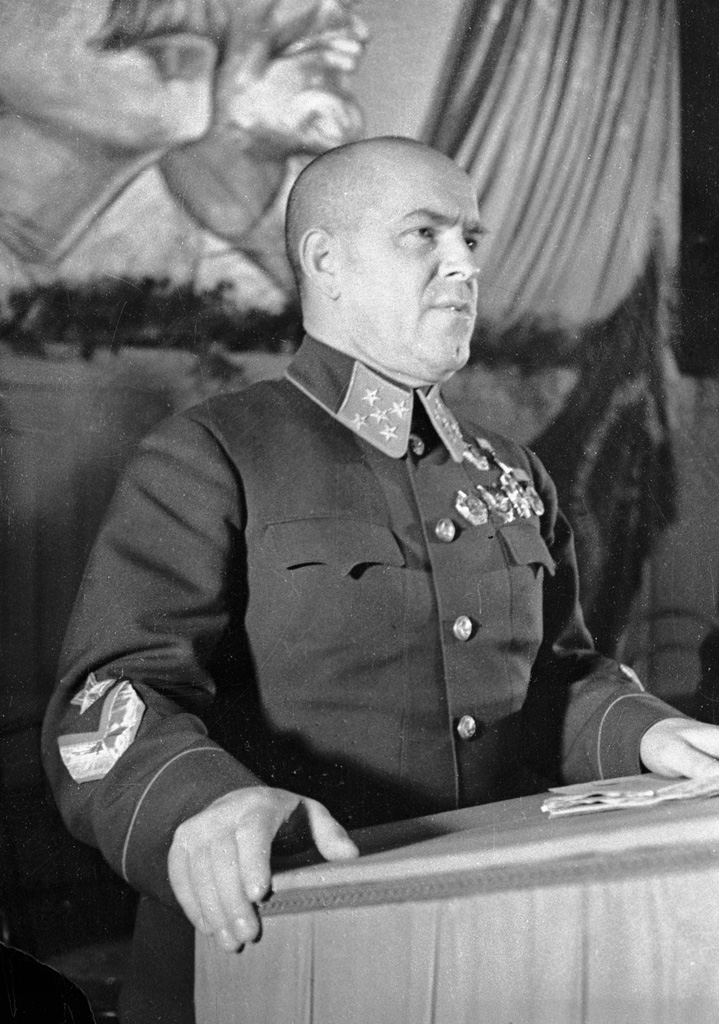
Army general (later Marshal) Zhukov speaking at a military conference in Moscow, September 1941

In early 1941, Stalin authorised the State Defence Plan 1941 (DP-41), which along with the Mobilisation Plan 1941 (MP-41), called for the deployment of 186 divisions, as the first strategic echelon, in the four military districts (Note: The four Soviet military districts facing the Axis, the Baltic Military District, the Western Special Military District, the Kiev Special Military District and the Odessa Military District, at the outbreak of the war were renamed the Northwestern Front, the Western Front, the Southwestern Front and the Southern Front, respectively. A fifth military district, the Leningrad military district, became the Northern Front.) of the western Soviet Union that faced the Axis territories; and the deployment of another 51 divisions along the Dvina and Dnieper Rivers as the second strategic echelon under Stavka control, which in the case of a German invasion was tasked to spearhead a Soviet counteroffensive along with the remaining forces of the first echelon. But on 22 June 1941 the first echelon contained 171 divisions, numbering 2.6–2.9 million; and the second strategic echelon contained 57 divisions that were still mobilising, most of which were still understrength. The second echelon was undetected by German intelligence until days after the invasion commenced, in most cases only when German ground forces encountered them.

At the start of the invasion, the manpower of the Soviet military force that had been mobilised was 5.3–5.5 million, and it was still increasing as the Soviet reserve force of 14 million, with at least basic military training, continued to mobilise. The Red Army was dispersed and still preparing when the invasion commenced. Their units were often separated and lacked adequate transportation. While transportation remained insufficient for Red Army forces, when Operation Barbarossa kicked off, they possessed some 33,000 pieces of artillery, a number far greater than the Germans had at their disposal. (Note: Historian Victor Davis Hanson reports that before the war came to its conclusion, the Soviets had an artillery advantage over the Germans of seven-to-one and that artillery production was the only area where they doubled U.S. and British manufacturing output.)

A Deputy Director of the Soviet Defense Ministry's Institute of Military Affairs, Yuri Kirshin, documented that the Red Army had around 23,000 tanks available at the start of Barbarossa of which 14,700 were combat-ready. Around 11,000 tanks were in the western military districts that faced the German invasion force. According to military historian John Burtt, 17,520 tanks out of a total of Soviet 24,000 were out of commission while undergoing maintenance in June 1941, thereby leaving only 6,480 available for frontline service at the time of the German invasion.

Hitler later declared to some of his generals, "If I had known about the Russian tank strength in 1941 I would not have attacked". However, maintenance and readiness standards were very poor; ammunition and radios were in short supply, and many armoured units lacked trucks for supplies. The most advanced Soviet tank models—the KV-1 and T-34—which were superior to all current German tanks, as well as all designs still in development as of the summer 1941, were not available in large numbers at the time the invasion commenced. Furthermore, in the autumn of 1939, the Soviets disbanded their mechanised corps and partly dispersed their tanks to infantry divisions; but following their observation of the German campaign in France, in late 1940 they began to reorganise most of their armoured assets back into mechanised corps with a target strength of 1,031 tanks each. However, these large armoured formations were unwieldy, and moreover they were spread out in scattered garrisons, with their subordinate divisions up to 100 kilometres (62 miles) apart. The reorganisation was still in progress and incomplete when Barbarossa commenced. Soviet tank units were rarely well equipped, and they lacked training and logistical support. Units were sent into combat with no arrangements in place for refuelling, ammunition resupply, or personnel replacement. Often, after a single engagement, units were destroyed or rendered ineffective. The Soviet numerical advantage in heavy equipment was thoroughly offset by the superior training and organisation of the Wehrmacht.

The Soviet Air Force (VVS) held the numerical advantage with a total of approximately 19,533 aircraft, which made it the largest air force in the world in the summer of 1941. About 7,133–9,100 of these were deployed in the five western military districts, and an additional 1,445 were under naval control.

Development of the Soviet Armed Forces
	1 January 1939	22 June 1941	Increase
Divisions calculated	131.5	316.5	140.7%
Personnel	2,485,000	5,774,000	132.4%
Guns and mortars	55,800	117,600	110.7%
Tanks	21,100	25,700	21.8%
Aircraft	7,700	18,700	142.8%

Historians have debated whether Stalin was planning an invasion of German territory in the summer of 1941. The debate began in the late 1980s when Viktor Suvorov published a journal article and later the book Icebreaker in which he claimed that Stalin had seen the outbreak of war in Western Europe as an opportunity to spread communist revolutions throughout the continent, and that the Soviet military was being deployed for an imminent attack at the time of the German invasion. This view had also been advanced by former German generals following the war. Suvorov's thesis was fully or partially accepted by a limited number of historians, including Valeri Danilov, Joachim Hoffmann, Mikhail Meltyukhov, and Vladimir Nevezhin, and attracted public attention in Germany, Israel, and Russia. It has been strongly rejected by most historians, and Icebreaker is generally considered to be an "anti-Soviet tract" in Western countries. David Glantz and Gabriel Gorodetsky wrote books to rebut Suvorov's arguments. The majority of historians believe that Stalin was seeking to avoid war in 1941, as he believed that his military was not ready to fight the German forces. The debate on whether Stalin intended to launch an offensive against Germany in 1941 remains inconclusive but has produced an abundance of scholarly literature and helped to expand the understanding of larger themes in Soviet and world history during the interwar period.

== Order of battle ==
Order of battle – June 1941
Axis forces	Soviet forces
Northern Theatre; Army of Norway; Finnish Army of Karelia; Army Group North; 18th Army; Panzer Group 4; 16th Army; Luftflotte 1; Army Group Centre; Panzer Group 3; 9th Army; 4th Army; Panzer Group 2; Luftflotte 2; Army Group South; 6th Army; Panzer Group 1; 17th Army; Slovak Expeditionary Army Group; Royal Hungarian Army Mobile Corps; 11th Army; Italian Expeditionary Corps in Russia; Romanian 3rd Army; Romanian 4th Army; Luftflotte 4	Northern Front; 7th Army; 14th Army; 23rd Army; 10th Mechanised Corps; 1st Mechanised Corps; Northern PVO; North-Western Front; 27th Army; 8th Army; 12th Mechanised Corps; 11th Army; 3rd Mechanised Corps; 5th Airborne Corps; Baltic VVS; Northern Fleet; Baltic Fleet; Western Front; 3rd Army; 11th Mechanised Corps; 10th Army; 6th Mechanised Corps; 13th Mechanised Corps; 4th Army; 14th Mechanised Corps; 13th Army; 17th and 20th Mechanised Corps; 2nd Rifle, 21st Rifle, 44th Rifle, 47th Rifle, 50th Rifle and 4th Airborne Corps; Western VVS; South-Western Front; 5th Army; 9th Mechanised Corps; 22nd Mechanised Corps; 6th Army; 4th Mechanised Corps; 15th Mechanised Corps; 26th Army; 8th Mechanised Corps; 12th Army; 16th Mechanised Corps; 31 Rifle, 36th Rifle, 49th Rifle, 55th Rifle and 1st Airborne Corps; Kiev VVS; Southern Front; 9th Independent Army; 2nd Mechanised Corps; 18th Mechanised Corps; 7th Rifle, 9th Rifle and 3rd Airborne Corps; Odessa VVS; Black Sea Fleet; Stavka Reserve Armies (second strategic echelon); 16th Army; 5th Mechanised Corps; 19th Army; 26th Mechanised Corps; 20th Army; 7th Mechanised Corps; 21st Army; 25th Mechanised Corps; 22nd Army; 24th Army; 20th Rifle, 45th Rifle, 67th Rifle and 21st Mechanised Corps.
Total number of divisions (22 June)
German: 152 Romanian: 14	Soviet: 220

== Invasion ==
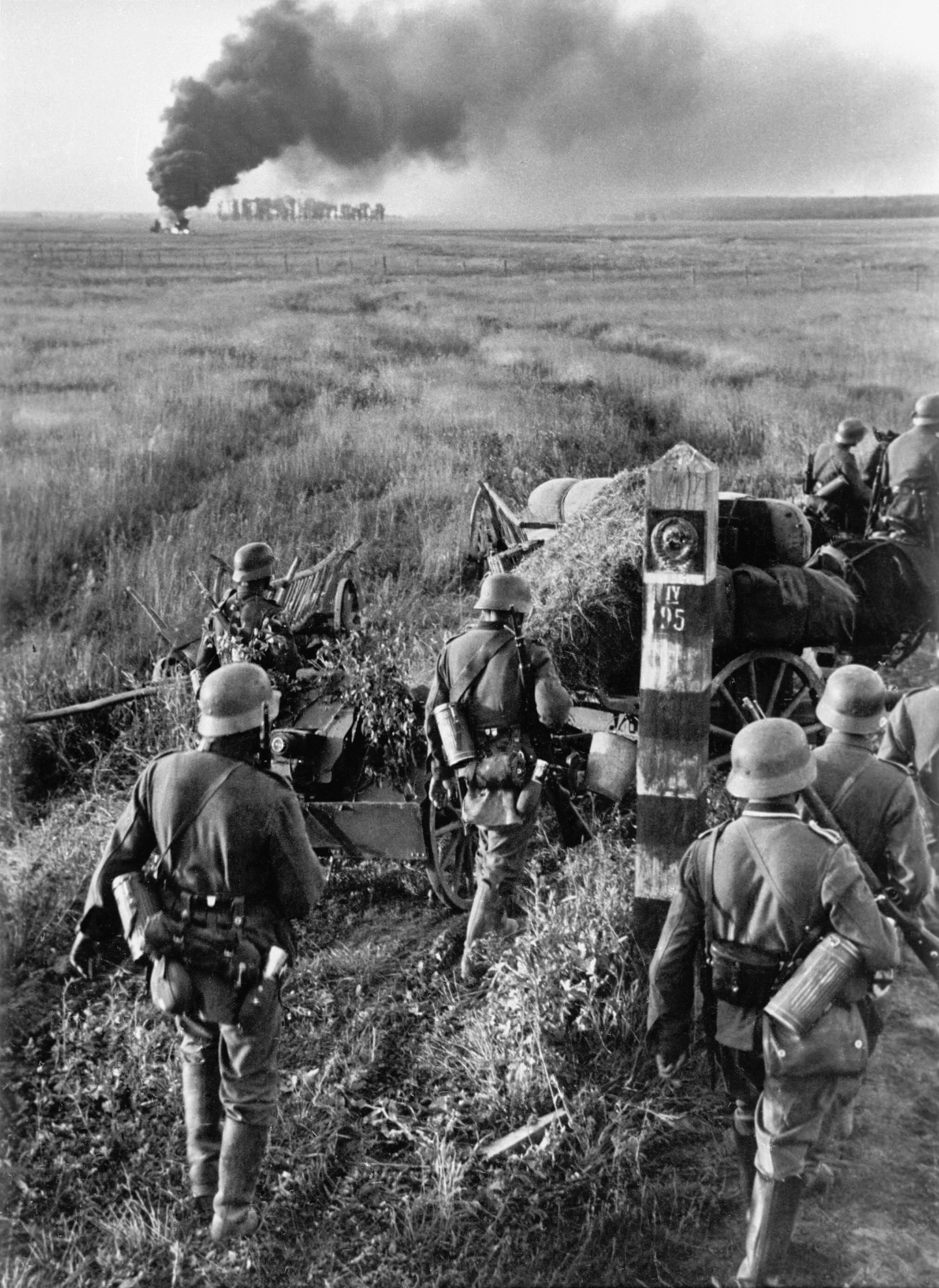
German troops crossing the Soviet state border marker, 22 June 1941

At around 01:00 on Sunday, 22 June 1941, the Soviet military districts in the border area were alerted by NKO Directive No. 1, issued late on the night of 21 June. It called on them to "bring all forces to combat readiness", but to "avoid provocative actions of any kind". It took up to two hours for several of the units subordinate to the Fronts to receive the order of the directive, and the majority did not receive it before the invasion commenced. A German communist deserter, Alfred Liskow, had crossed the lines at 21:00 on 21 June (Note: The NKGB learned about Liskow only at 03:00 on 22 June.) and informed the Soviets that an attack was coming at 04:00. Stalin was informed, but apparently regarded it as disinformation. Liskow was still being interrogated when the attack began.

On 21 June, at 13:00 Army Group North received the codeword "Düsseldorf", indicating Barbarossa would commence the next morning, and passed down its own codeword, "Dortmund". At around 03:15 on 22 June 1941, the Axis Powers commenced the invasion of the Soviet Union with the bombing of major cities in Soviet-occupied Poland and an artillery barrage on Red Army defences on the entire front. Air-raids were conducted as far as Kronstadt near Leningrad and Sevastopol in the Crimea. At the same time the German declaration of war was presented by Foreign Minister Joachim von Ribbentrop, first delivered at 05:30 Moscow time by German ambassador Friedrich von der Schulenburg to Soviet foreign minister Vyacheslav Molotov. Meanwhile, ground troops crossed the border, accompanied in some locales by Lithuanian and Ukrainian partisans. Roughly three million soldiers of the Wehrmacht went into action and faced slightly fewer Soviet troops at the border. Accompanying the German forces during the initial invasion were Finnish and Romanian units as well.

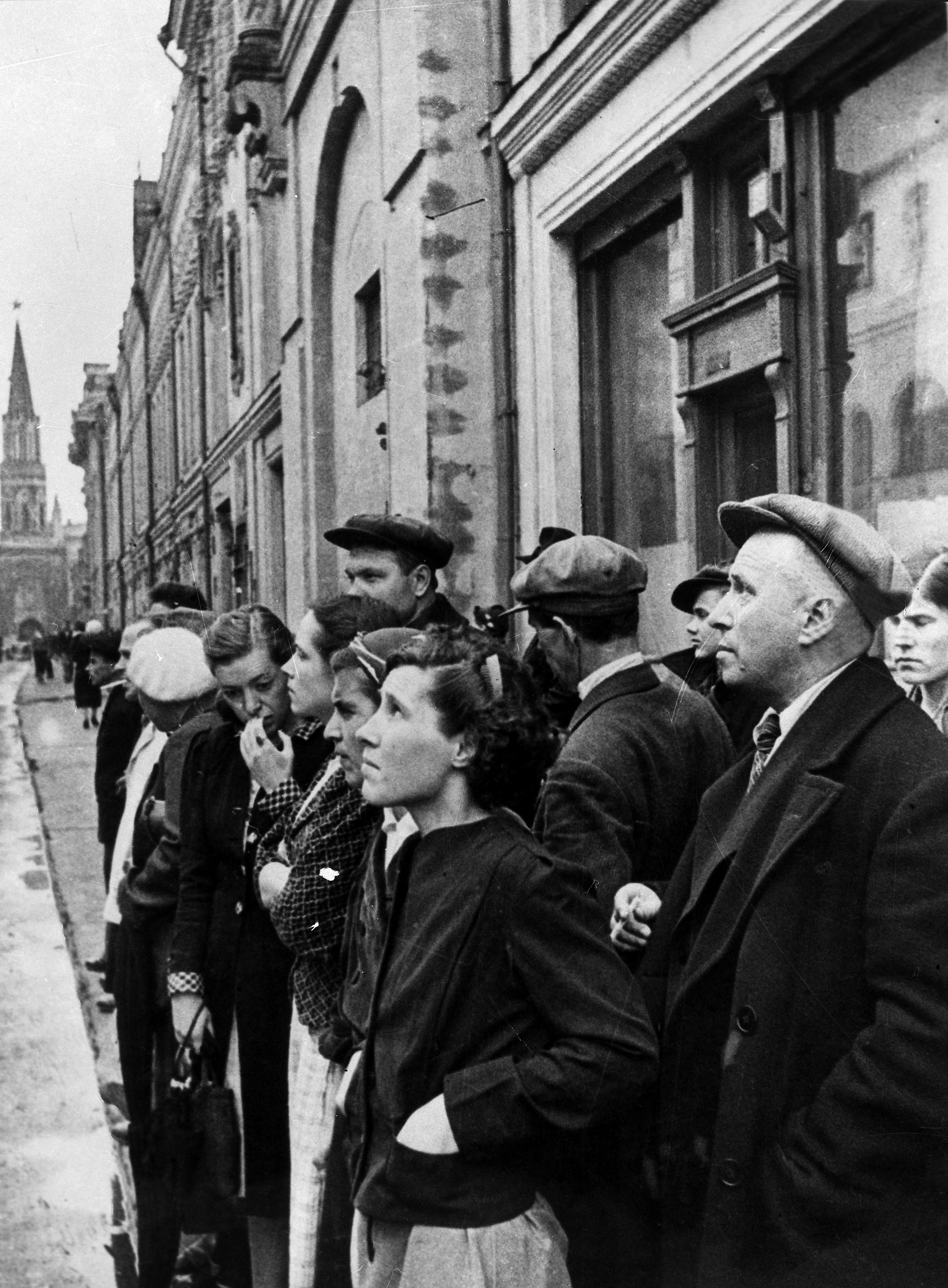
Moscovites gather by a loudspeaker to listen to Molotov's speech, 22 June 1941

At around noon, the news of the invasion was broadcast to the Soviet population by Molotov: "... Without a declaration of war, German forces fell on our country, attacked our frontiers in many places ... The Red Army and the whole nation will wage a victorious Patriotic War for our beloved country, for honour, for liberty ... Our cause is just. The enemy will be beaten. Victory will be ours!" By calling upon the population's devotion to their nation rather than the Party, Molotov struck a patriotic chord that helped the stunned citizens absorb the shattering news. Within the first few days of the invasion, the Soviet High Command and Red Army were extensively reorganised so as to place them on the necessary war footing. Stalin did not address the nation about the German invasion until 3 July, when he also called for a "Patriotic War... of the entire Soviet people".

In Germany, on the morning of 22 June, Nazi propaganda minister Joseph Goebbels announced the invasion to the waking nation in a radio broadcast with Hitler's words: "At this moment a march is taking place that, for its extent, compares with the greatest the world has ever seen. I have decided today to place the fate and future of the Reich and our people in the hands of our soldiers. May God aid us, especially in this fight!" Later the same morning, Hitler proclaimed to his colleagues, "Before three months have passed, we shall witness a collapse of Russia, the like of which has never been seen in history". Hitler also addressed the German people via the radio, presenting himself as a man of peace, who reluctantly had to attack the Soviet Union. Following the invasion, Goebbels instructed that Nazi propaganda use the slogan "European crusade against Bolshevism" to describe the war; subsequently thousands of volunteers and conscripts joined the Waffen-SS.

== Initial attacks ==
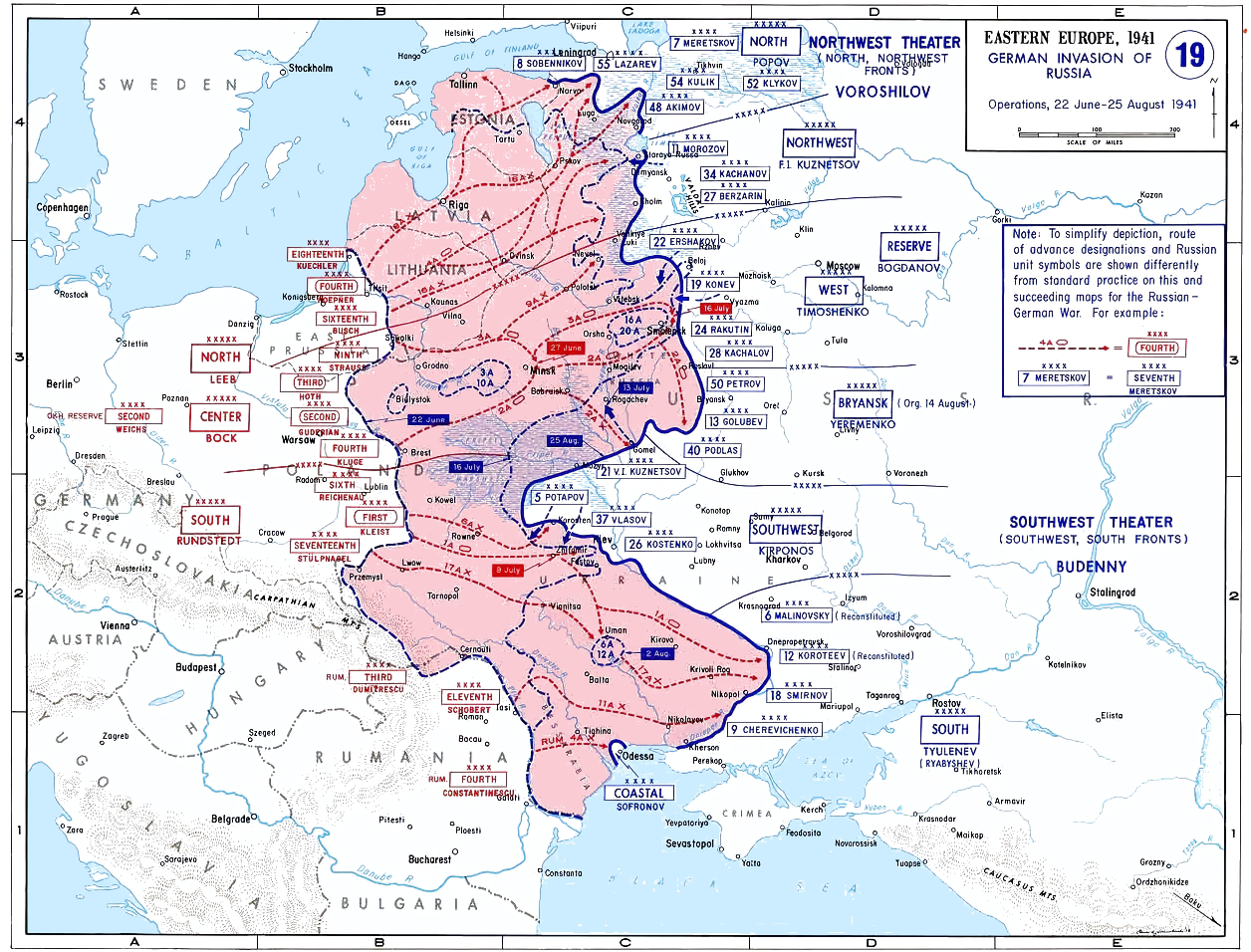
German advances from June to August 1941

The initial momentum of the German ground and air attack completely destroyed the Soviet organisational command and control within the first few hours, paralyzing every level of command from the infantry platoon to the Soviet High Command in Moscow. Moscow failed to grasp the magnitude of the catastrophe that confronted the Soviet forces in the border area, and Stalin's first reaction was disbelief. At around 07:15, Stalin issued NKO Directive No. 2, which announced the invasion to the Soviet Armed Forces, and called on them to attack Axis forces wherever they had violated the borders and launch air strikes into the border regions of German territory. At around 09:15, Stalin issued NKO Directive No. 3, signed by Timoshenko, which now called for a general counteroffensive on the entire front "without any regards for borders" that both men hoped would sweep the enemy from Soviet territory. Stalin's order, which Timoshenko authorised, was not based on a realistic appraisal of the military situation at hand, but commanders passed it along for fear of retribution if they failed to obey; several days passed before the Soviet leadership became aware of the enormity of the opening defeat, and before Stalin comprehended the magnitude of the calamity. Significant amounts of Soviet territory were lost along with Red Army forces as a result.

=== Air war ===
Luftwaffe reconnaissance units plotted Soviet troop concentrations, supply dumps and airfields, and marked them down for destruction. Additional Luftwaffe attacks were carried out against Soviet command and control centres to disrupt the mobilisation and organisation of Soviet forces. In contrast, Soviet artillery observers based at the border area had been under the strictest instructions not to open fire on German aircraft prior to the invasion. One plausible reason given for the Soviet hesitation to return fire was Stalin's initial belief that the assault was launched without Hitler's authorisation. The Luftwaffe reportedly destroyed 1,489 aircraft on the first day of the invasion and over 3,100 during the first three days. Hermann Göring, Minister of Aviation and Commander-in-Chief of the Luftwaffe, distrusted the reports and ordered the figure checked. Luftwaffe staffs surveyed the wreckage on Soviet airfields, and their original figure proved conservative, as over 2,000 Soviet aircraft were estimated to have been destroyed on the first day of the invasion. In reality, Soviet losses were likely higher; a Soviet archival document recorded the loss of 3,922 Soviet aircraft in the first three days against an estimated loss of 78 German aircraft. The Luftwaffe reported the loss of only 35 aircraft on the first day of combat. A document from the German Federal Archives puts the Luftwaffe's loss at 63 aircraft for the first day.

By the end of the first week, the Luftwaffe had achieved air supremacy over the battlefields of all the army groups, but was unable to extend this air dominance over the vast expanse of the western Soviet Union. According to the war diaries of the German High Command, the Luftwaffe by 5 July had lost 491 aircraft with 316 more damaged, leaving it with only about 70 percent of the strength it had at the start of the invasion.

=== Baltic countries ===
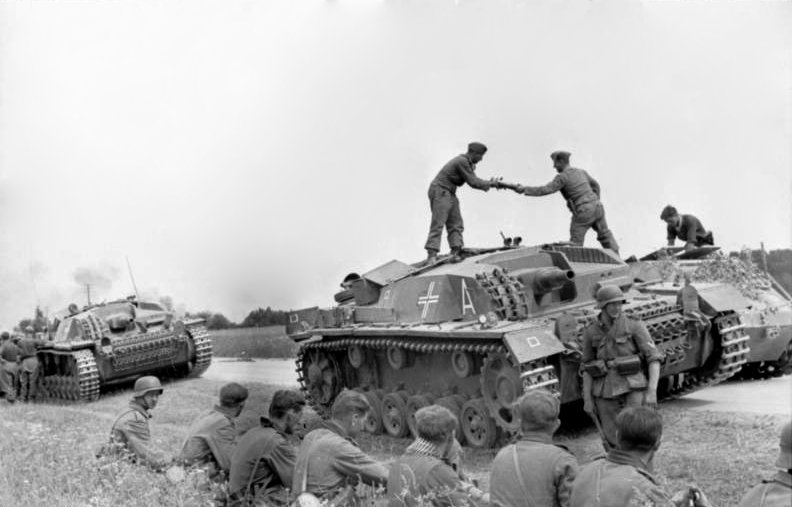
German forces pushing through Latvia, summer 1941

On 22 June, Army Group North attacked the Soviet Northwestern Front and broke through its 8th and 11th Armies. The Soviets immediately launched a powerful counterattack against the German 4th Panzer Group with the Soviet 3rd and 12th Mechanised Corps, but the Soviet attack was defeated. On 25 June, the 8th and 11th Armies were ordered to withdraw to the Western Dvina River, where it was planned to meet up with the 21st Mechanised Corps and the 22nd and 27th Armies. However, on 26 June, Erich von Manstein's LVI Panzer Corps reached the river first and secured a bridgehead across it. The Northwestern Front was forced to abandon the river defences, and on 29 June Stavka ordered the Front to withdraw to the Stalin Line on the approaches to Leningrad. On 2 July, Army Group North began its attack on the Stalin Line with its 4th Panzer Group, and on 8 July captured Pskov, devastating the defences of the Stalin Line and reaching Leningrad oblast. The 4th Panzer Group had advanced about 450 kilometres (280 mi) since the start of the invasion and was now only about 250 kilometres (160 mi) from its primary objective Leningrad. On 9 July it began its attack towards the Soviet defences along the Luga River in Leningrad oblast.

=== Ukraine and Moldavia ===
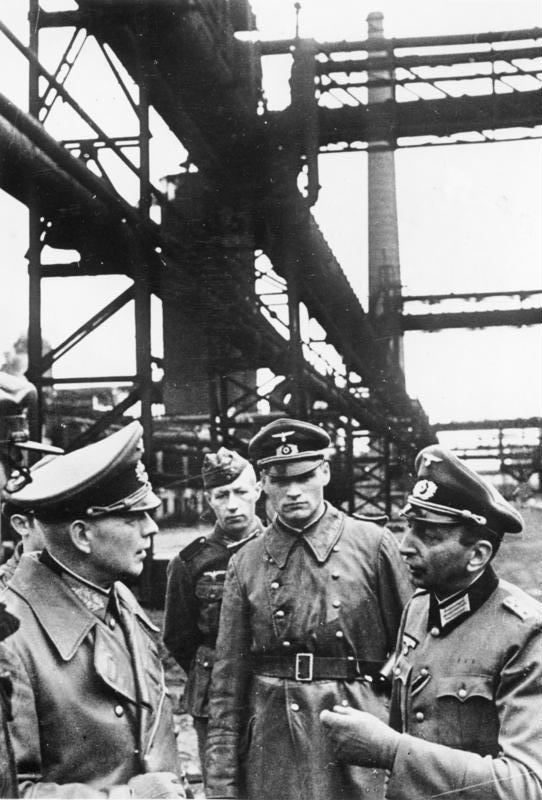
General Ewald von Kleist (left), commander of the 1st Panzer Group, inspects a large iron works facility in Ukraine, 1941.

The northern section of Army Group South faced the Southwestern Front, which had the largest concentration of Soviet forces, and the southern section faced the Southern Front. In addition, the Pripyat Marshes and the Carpathian Mountains posed a serious challenge to the army group's northern and southern sections respectively. On 22 June, only the northern section of Army Group South attacked, but the terrain impeded their assault, giving the Soviet defenders ample time to react. The German 1st Panzer Group and 6th Army attacked and broke through the Soviet 5th Army. Starting on the night of 23 June, the Soviet 22nd and 15th Mechanised Corps attacked the flanks of the 1st Panzer Group from north and south respectively. Although intended to be concerted, Soviet tank units were sent in piecemeal due to poor coordination. The 22nd Mechanised Corps ran into the 1st Panzer Army's III Motorised Corps and was decimated, and its commander killed. The 1st Panzer Group bypassed much of the 15th Mechanised Corps, which engaged the German 6th Army's 297th Infantry Division, where it was defeated by antitank fire and Luftwaffe attacks. On 26 June, the Soviets launched another counterattack on the 1st Panzer Group from north and south simultaneously with the 9th, 19th and 8th Mechanised Corps, which altogether fielded 1,649 tanks, and supported by the remnants of the 15th Mechanised Corps. The battle lasted for four days, ending in the defeat of the Soviet tank units. On 30 June Stavka ordered the remaining forces of the Southwestern Front to withdraw to the Stalin Line, where it would defend the approaches to Kiev.

On 2 July, the southern section of Army Group South—the Romanian 3rd and 4th Armies, alongside the German 11th Army—entered Soviet Moldavia, which was defended by the Southern Front. Counterattacks by the Front's 2nd Mechanised Corps and 9th Army were defeated, but on 9 July the Axis advance stalled along the defences of the Soviet 18th Army between the Prut and Dniester rivers.

=== Belorussia ===
In the opening hours of the invasion, the Luftwaffe destroyed the Western Front's air force on the ground, and with the aid of Abwehr and their supporting anti-communist fifth columns operating in the Soviet rear paralyzed the Front's communication lines, which particularly cut off the Soviet 4th Army headquarters from headquarters above and below it. On the same day, the 2nd Panzer Group crossed the Bug River, broke through the 4th Army, bypassed Brest Fortress, and pressed on towards Minsk, while the 3rd Panzer Group bypassed most of the 3rd Army and pressed on towards Vilnius. Simultaneously, the German 4th and 9th Armies engaged the Western Front forces in the environs of Białystok. On the order of the Western Front commander, Dmitry Pavlov, the 6th and 11th Mechanised Corps and the 6th Cavalry Corps launched a strong counterstrike towards Grodno on 24–25 June in hopes of destroying the 3rd Panzer Group. However, the 3rd Panzer Group had already moved on, with its forward units reaching Vilnius on the evening of 23 June, and the Western Front's armoured counterattack instead ran into infantry and antitank fire from the V Army Corps of the German 9th Army, supported by Luftwaffe air attacks. By the night of 25 June, the Soviet counterattack was defeated, and the commander of the 6th Cavalry Corps was captured. The same night, Pavlov ordered all the remnants of the Western Front to withdraw to Slonim towards Minsk. Subsequent counterattacks to buy time for the withdrawal were launched against the German forces, but all of them failed. On 27 June, the 2nd and 3rd Panzer Groups met near Minsk and captured the city the next day, completing the encirclement of almost all of the Western Front in two pockets: one around Białystok and another west of Minsk. The Germans destroyed the Soviet 3rd and 10th Armies while inflicting serious losses on the 4th, 11th and 13th Armies, and reported to have captured 324,000 Soviet troops, 3,300 tanks, 1,800 artillery pieces.

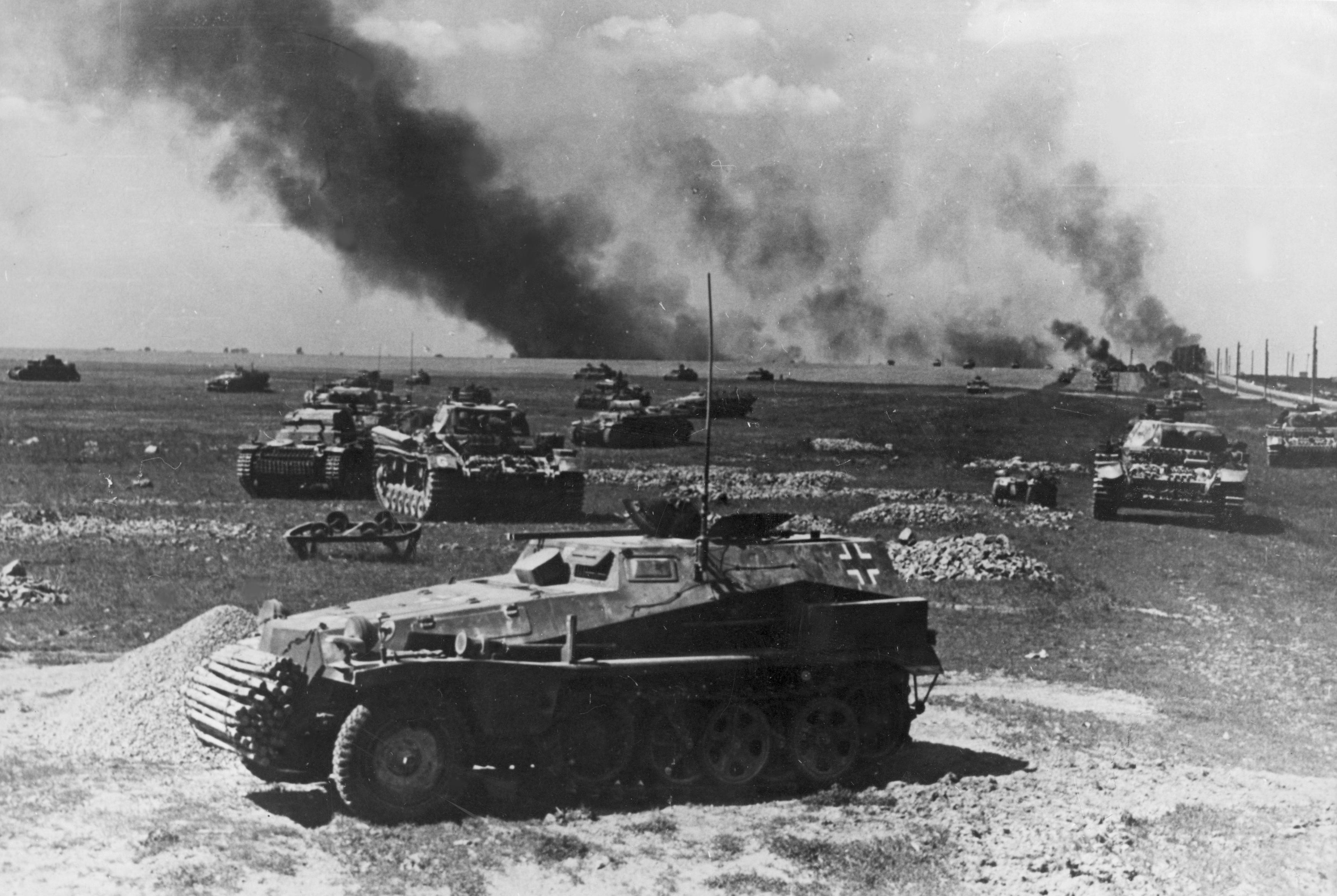
German mechanised forces staging in preparation to attack Slutsk in present-day Belarus

A Soviet directive was issued on 29 June to combat the mass panic rampant among the civilians and the armed forces personnel. The order stipulated swift, severe measures against anyone inciting panic or displaying cowardice. The NKVD worked with commissars and military commanders to scour possible withdrawal routes of soldiers retreating without military authorisation. Field expedient general courts were established to deal with civilians spreading rumours and military deserters. On 30 June, Stalin relieved Pavlov of his command, and on 22 July tried and executed him along with many members of his staff on charges of "cowardice" and "criminal incompetence".

On 29 June, Hitler, through Brauchitsch, instructed Bock to halt the advance of the panzers of Army Group Centre until the infantry formations liquidating the pockets caught up but Guderian, with the tacit support of Bock and Halder, ignored the instruction and attacked on eastward towards Bobruisk, albeit reporting the advance as a reconnaissance-in-force. He also personally conducted an aerial inspection of the Minsk-Białystok pocket on 30 June and concluded that his panzer group was not needed to contain it, since Hermann Hoth's 3rd Panzer Group was already involved in the Minsk pocket. On the same day, some of the infantry corps of the 9th and 4th Armies, having sufficiently liquidated the Białystok pocket, resumed their march eastward to catch up with the panzer groups. On 1 July, Bock ordered the panzer groups to resume their full offensive eastward on the morning of 3 July. But Brauchitsch, upholding Hitler's instruction, and Halder, unwillingly going along with it, opposed Bock's order. However, Bock insisted on the order by stating that it would be irresponsible to reverse orders already issued. The panzer groups resumed their offensive on 2 July before the infantry formations had sufficiently caught up.

=== Northeast Finland ===
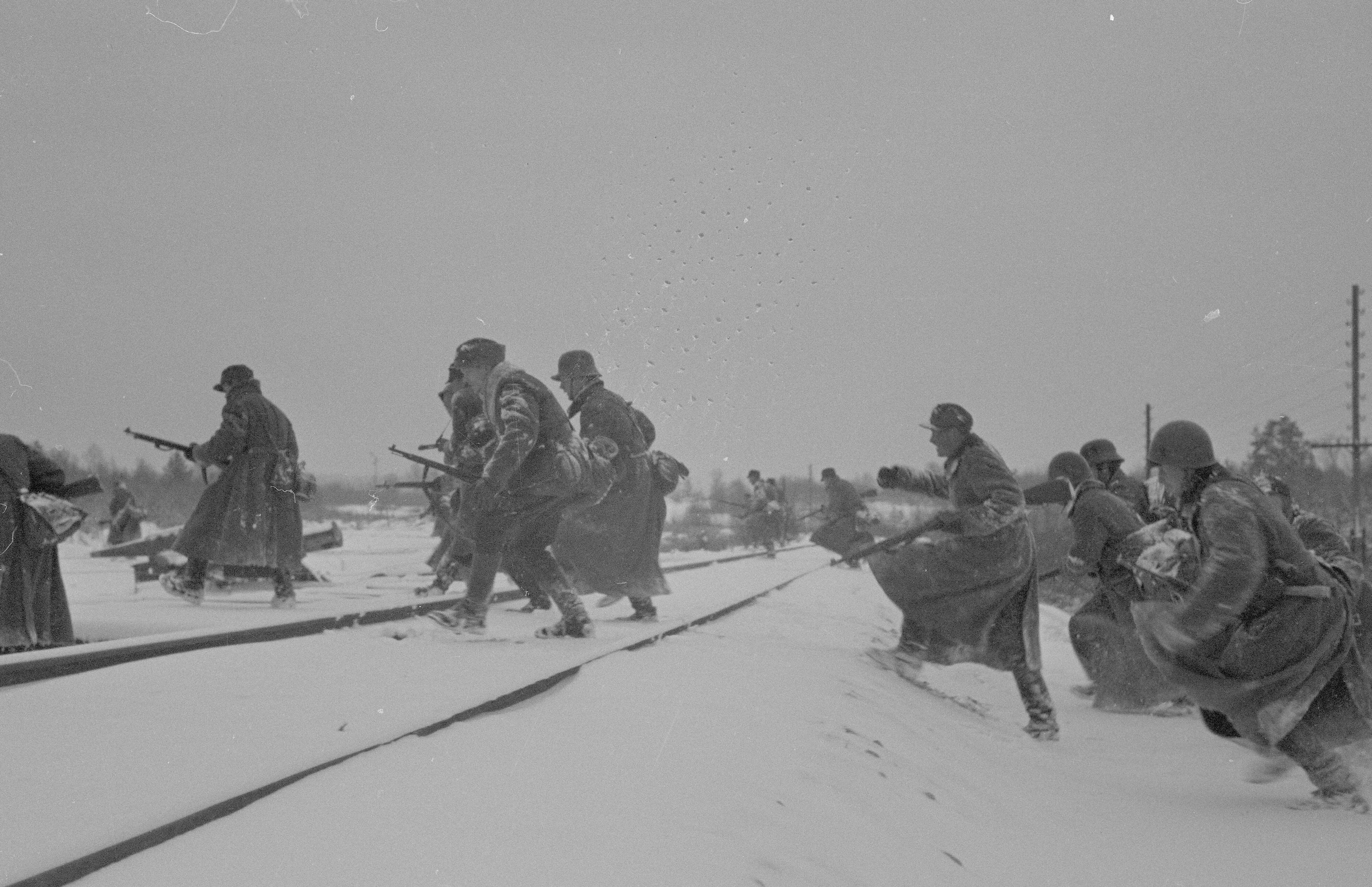
Finnish soldiers crossing the Murmansk Railway, 1941

During German-Finnish negotiations, Finland had demanded to remain neutral unless the Soviet Union attacked them first. Germany therefore sought to provoke the Soviet Union into an attack on Finland. After Germany launched Barbarossa on 22 June, German aircraft used Finnish air bases to attack Soviet positions. The same day the Germans launched Operation Rentier and occupied the Petsamo Province at the Finnish-Soviet border. Simultaneously Finland proceeded to remilitarise the neutral Åland Islands. Despite these actions the Finnish government insisted via diplomatic channels that they remained a neutral party, but the Soviet leadership already viewed Finland as an ally of Germany. Subsequently, the Soviets proceeded to launch a massive bombing attack on 25 June against all major Finnish cities and industrial centres, including Helsinki, Turku, and Lahti. During a night session on the same day the Finnish parliament decided to go to war against the Soviet Union.

Finland was divided into two operational zones. Northern Finland was the staging area for Army Norway. Its goal was to execute a two-pronged pincer movement on the strategic port of Murmansk, named Operation Silver Fox. Southern Finland was still under the responsibility of the Finnish Army. The goal of the Finnish forces was, at first, to recapture Ladoga Karelia as well as the Karelian Isthmus, which included Finland's second largest city Viipuri.

== Further German advances ==
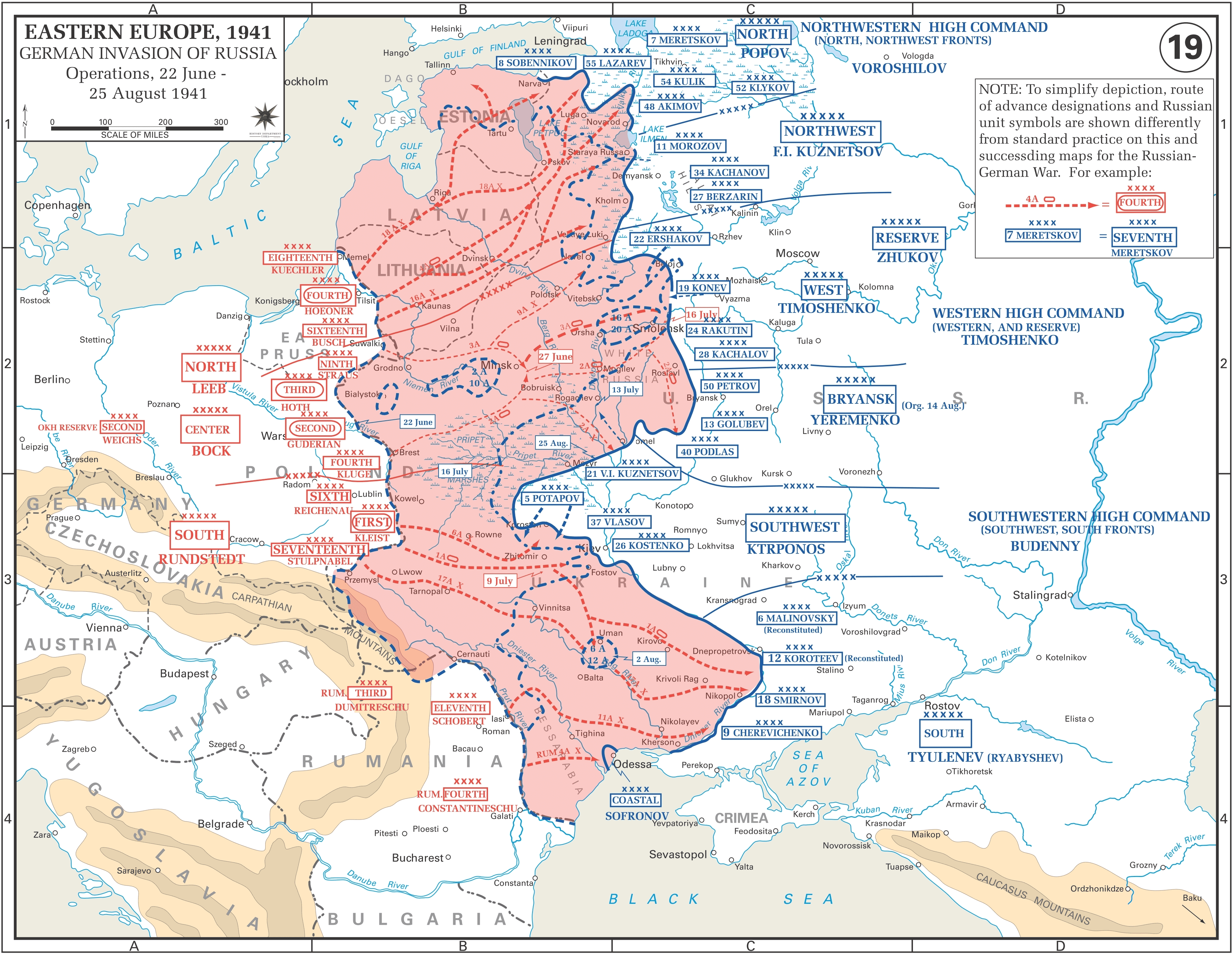
German advances during the opening phases of Operation Barbarossa, August 1941

On 2 July and through the next six days, a rainstorm typical of Belarusian summers slowed the progress of the panzers of Army Group Centre, and Soviet defences stiffened. The delays gave the Soviets time to organise a massive counterattack against Army Group Centre. The army group's ultimate objective was Smolensk, which commanded the road to Moscow. Facing the Germans was an old Soviet defensive line held by six armies. On 6 July, the Soviets launched a counter-attack using the V and VII Mechanised Corps of the 20th Army, which collided with the German 39th and 47th Panzer Corps in a battle where the Red Army lost 832 tanks of the 2,000 employed during five days of ferocious fighting. The Germans defeated this counterattack thanks largely to the coincidental presence of the Luftwaffe's only squadron of tank-busting aircraft. The 2nd Panzer Group crossed the Dnieper River and closed in on Smolensk from the south, while the 3rd Panzer Group, after defeating the Soviet counterattack, closed on Smolensk from the north. Trapped between their pincers were three Soviet armies. The 29th Motorised Division captured Smolensk on 16 July, yet a gap remained in Army Group Centre. On 18 July, the panzer groups came to within ten kilometres (6.2 mi) of closing the gap, but the trap did not finally close until 5 August, when upwards of 300,000 Red Army soldiers had been captured and 3,205 Soviet tanks were destroyed. Large numbers of Red Army soldiers escaped to stand between the Germans and Moscow as resistance continued.

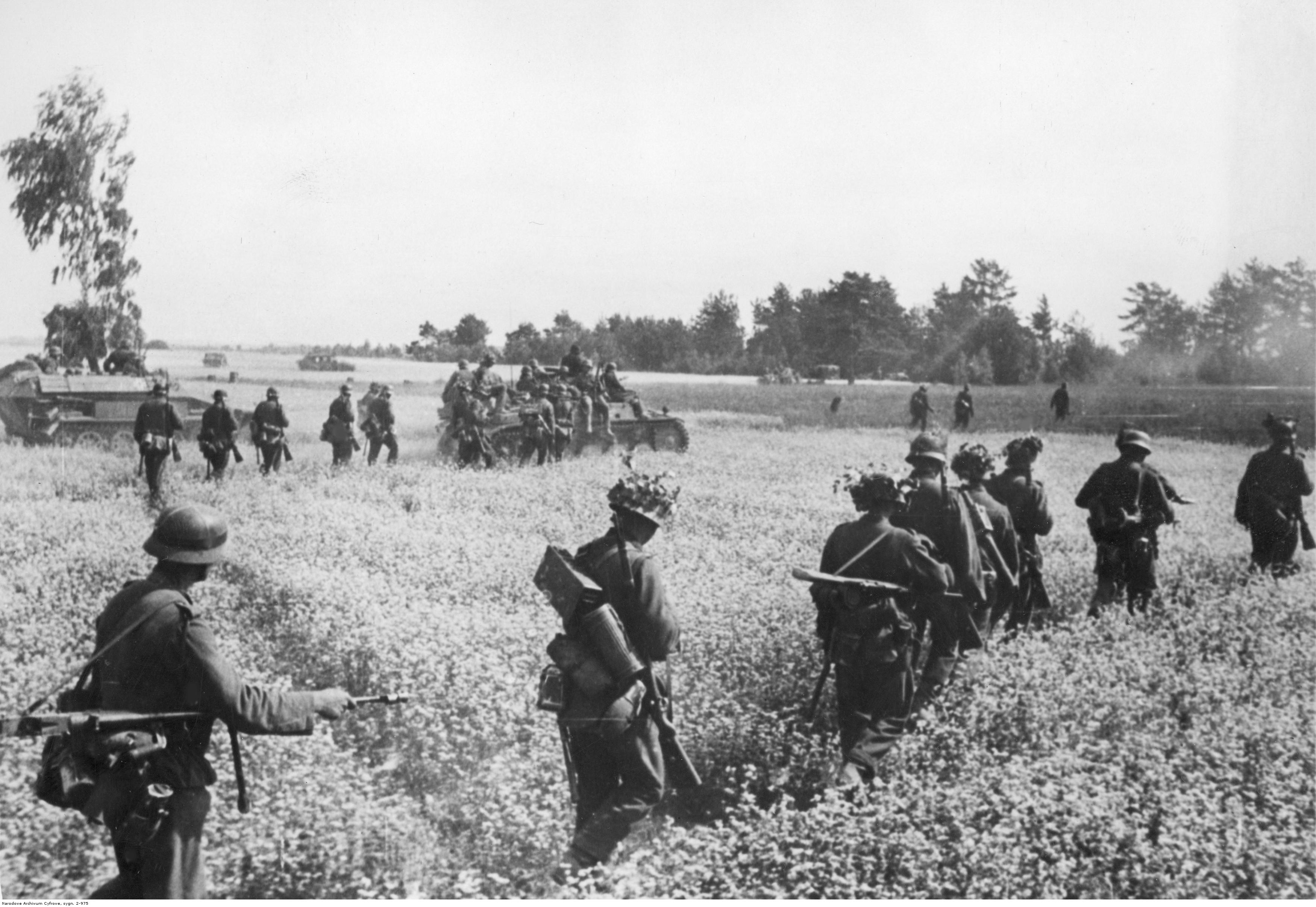
German mechanized forces pushing east through a rapeseed field, August 1941.

Four weeks into the campaign, the Germans realised they had grossly underestimated Soviet strength. The German troops had used their initial supplies, and General Bock quickly came to the conclusion that not only had the Red Army offered stiff opposition, but German difficulties were also due to the logistical problems with reinforcements and provisions. Operations were slowed down to allow for resupply; the delay was to be used to adapt strategy to the new situation. In addition to strained logistics, poor roads made it difficult for wheeled vehicles and foot infantry to keep up with the faster armoured spearheads, and shortages in boots and winter uniforms were becoming apparent. Furthermore, all three army groups had suffered 179,500 casualties by 2 August, and had only received 47,000 replacements.

Hitler had lost faith in battles of encirclement, as large numbers of Soviet soldiers had escaped the pincers. He now believed he could defeat the Soviet state by economic means, depriving them of the industrial capacity to continue the war. That meant seizing the industrial centre of Kharkov, the Donbas, and the oil fields of the Caucasus in the south, and the speedy capture of Leningrad, a major centre of military production, in the north.

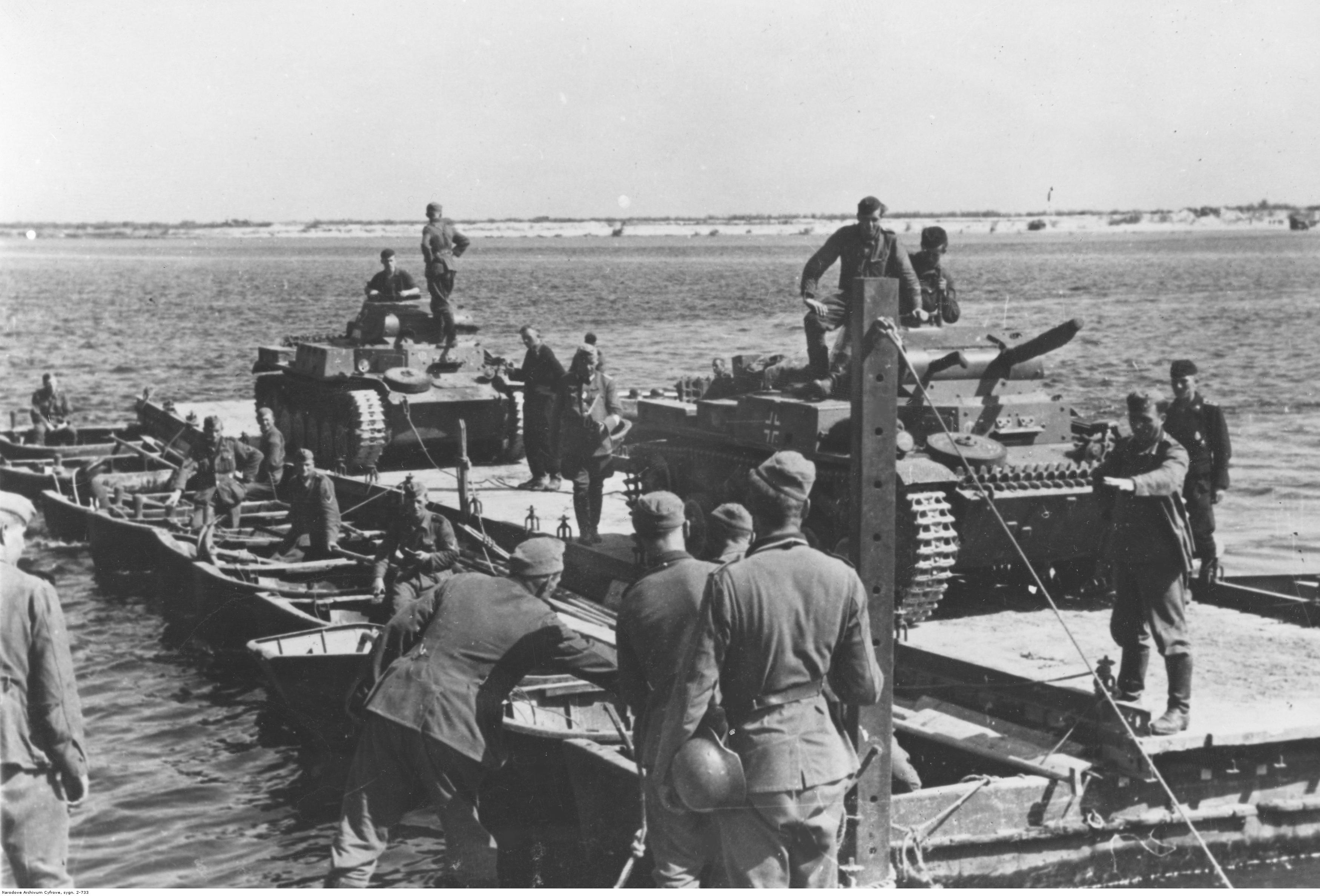
German armoured forces cross the Dnieper, September 1941.

Halder, Bock, and almost all the German generals involved in Operation Barbarossa argued vehemently in favour of continuing the all-out drive toward Moscow. Besides the psychological importance of capturing the Soviet capital, the generals pointed out that Moscow was a major centre of arms production, the centre of the Soviet communications system and an important transport hub. Intelligence reports indicated that the bulk of the remaining Red Army was deployed near Moscow under Timoshenko for the defence of the capital. Guderian was sent to Hitler by Bock and Halder to argue their case for continuing the assault against Moscow, but Hitler issued an order through Guderian (bypassing Bock and Halder) to send Army Group Centre's tanks to the north and south, temporarily halting the drive to Moscow. Convinced by Hitler's argument, Guderian returned to his commanding officers as a convert to the Führer's plan, which earned him their disdain.

=== Northern Finland ===
On 29 June, Germany launched its effort to capture Murmansk in a pincer attack. The northern pincer, conducted by Mountain Corps Norway, approached Murmansk directly by crossing the border at Petsamo. However, in mid-July, after securing the neck of the Rybachy Peninsula and advancing to the Litsa River, the German advance was stopped by heavy resistance from the Soviet 14th Army. Renewed attacks led to nothing, and this front became a stalemate for the remainder of Barbarossa.

A second pincer attack began on 1 July, with the German XXXVI Corps and Finnish III Corps slated to recapture the Salla region for Finland and then proceed eastwards to cut the Murmansk railway near Kandalaksha. The German units had great difficulty dealing with the Arctic conditions, but after heavy fighting, Salla was taken on 8 July. To keep the momentum, the German-Finnish forces advanced eastwards until they were stopped at the town of Kayraly by Soviet resistance. Further south, the Finnish III Corps made an independent effort to reach the Murmansk railway through the Arctic terrain. Facing only one division of the Soviet 7th Army, they were able to make rapid headway. On 7 August the Corps captured Kestenga and reached the outskirts of Ukhta. Large Red Army reinforcements then prevented further gains on both fronts, and the German-Finnish force had to go onto the defensive.

=== Karelia ===
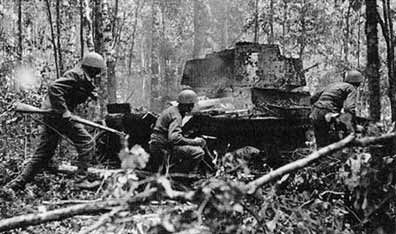
Finnish troops advancing in Karelia in August 1941

The Finnish plan in the south in Karelia was to advance as swiftly as possible to Lake Ladoga, cutting the Soviet forces in half. The Finnish territories west of Lake Ladoga were then to be recaptured, before the advance along the Karelian Isthmus, including the recapture of Viipuri, commenced. The Finnish attack was launched on 10 July. The Army of Karelia held a numerical advantage versus the Soviet defenders of the 7th Army and 23rd Army, so it could advance swiftly. The important road junction at Loimola was captured on 14 July. By 16 July, the first Finnish units reached Lake Ladoga at Koirinoja, achieving the goal of splitting the Soviet forces. During the rest of July, the Army of Karelia advanced further southeast into Karelia, coming to a halt at the former Finnish-Soviet border at Mansila.

With the Soviet forces cut in half, the attack on the Karelian Isthmus could commence. The Finnish army attempted to encircle large Soviet formations at Sortavala and Hiitola by advancing to the western shores of Lake Ladoga. By mid-August, the encirclement had succeeded and both towns were taken, but many Soviet formations were able to evacuate by sea. Further west, the attack on Viipuri was launched. With Soviet resistance breaking down, the Finns were able to encircle Viipuri by advancing to the Vuoksi River. The city itself was taken on 29 August, along with a broad advance on the rest of the Karelian Isthmus. By the beginning of September, Finland had restored its pre-Winter War borders.

=== Offensive towards central Russia ===
By mid-July, the German forces had advanced within a few kilometers of Kiev, below the Pripyat Marshes. The 1st Panzer Group then went south, while the 17th Army struck east and trapped three Soviet armies near Uman. As the Germans eliminated the pocket, the tanks turned north and crossed the Dnieper. Meanwhile, the 2nd Panzer Group, diverted from Army Group Centre, had crossed the river Desna with 2nd Army on its right flank. The two panzer armies now trapped four Soviet armies and parts of two others.

By August, as the serviceability and the quantity of the Luftwaffe's inventory steadily diminished due to combat, demand for air support only increased as the VVS recovered. The Luftwaffe found itself struggling to maintain local air superiority. With the onset of bad weather in October, the Luftwaffe was on several occasions forced to halt nearly all aerial operations. The VVS, although faced with the same weather difficulties, had a clear advantage, thanks to the prewar experience with cold-weather flying and the fact that they were operating from intact airbases and airports. By December, the VVS had matched the Luftwaffe, and was even pressing to achieve air superiority over the battlefields.

=== Leningrad ===
For its final attack on Leningrad, the 4th Panzer Group was reinforced by tanks from Army Group Centre. On 8 August, the Panzers broke through the Soviet defences, and by the end of August, the 4th Panzer Group had penetrated to within 48 kilometres (30 miles) of Leningrad. The Finns (Note: Significant planning for Finnish participation in the campaign against the Soviet Union was conducted well-before the plan's actual implementation.) had pushed southeast on both sides of Lake Ladoga to reach the old Finnish-Soviet frontier.

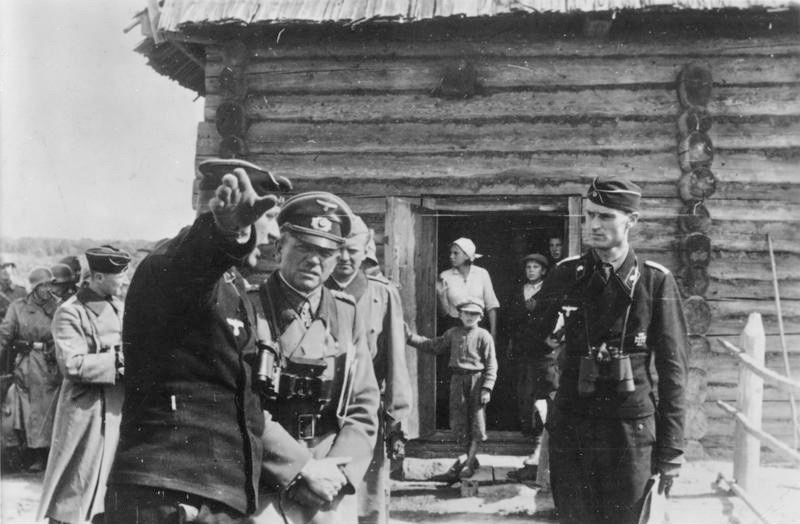
German general Heinz Guderian (centre), commander of Panzer Group 2, on 20 August 1941

The Germans attacked Leningrad in August 1941. In the following three "black months" of 1941, 400,000 residents of the city worked to build the city's fortifications as fighting continued, while 160,000 others joined the ranks of the Red Army. Nowhere was the Soviet levée en masse spirit stronger in resisting the Germans than at Leningrad, where reserve troops and freshly improvised Narodnoe Opolcheniye units, consisting of worker battalions and even schoolboy formations, joined in digging trenches as they prepared to defend the city. On 7 September, the German 20th Motorised Division seized Shlisselburg, cutting off all land routes to Leningrad. The Germans severed the railroads to Moscow and captured the railroad to Murmansk with Finnish assistance to inaugurate the start of a siege that would last for over two years.

At this stage, Hitler ordered the final destruction of Leningrad with no prisoners taken, and on 9 September, Army Group North began the final push. Within ten days it had advanced within 11 kilometres (6.8 miles) of the city. However, the push over the last 10 km (6.2 mi) proved very slow, and casualties mounted, so Hitler ordered that Leningrad should not be stormed, but rather starved into submission. Along these lines, the OKH issued Directive No. la 1601/41 on 22 September 1941, which accorded Hitler's plans.

Deprived of its Panzer forces, Army Group Centre remained static and was subjected to numerous Soviet counterattacks, in particular the Yelnya Offensive, in which the Germans suffered their first major tactical defeat since their invasion began; this Red Army victory also provided an important boost to Soviet morale. These attacks prompted Hitler to turn his attention back to Army Group Centre and its drive on Moscow. The Germans ordered the 3rd and 4th Panzer Armies to break off their siege of Leningrad and support Army Group Centre in its attack on Moscow.

=== Kiev ===
Before an attack on Moscow could begin, operations in Kiev needed to be finished. Half of Army Group Centre had swung to the south in the back of the Kiev position, while Army Group South moved to the north from its Dnieper bridgehead. The encirclement of Soviet forces in Kiev was achieved on 16 September. A battle ensued, in which the Soviets were hammered with tanks, artillery, and aerial bombardment. After ten days of vicious fighting, the Germans claimed to have captured 665,000 Soviet soldiers, although the real figure is probably around 220,000. Soviet losses were 452,720 men, 3,867 artillery pieces and mortars from 43 divisions of the 5th, 21st, 26th, and 37th Soviet Armies. Despite the exhaustion and losses facing some German units (upwards of 75 percent of their men) from the intense fighting, the massive defeat of the Soviets at Kiev and the Red Army losses during the first three months of the assault contributed to the German assumption that Operation Typhoon, the attack on Moscow, could still succeed.

=== Sea of Azov ===
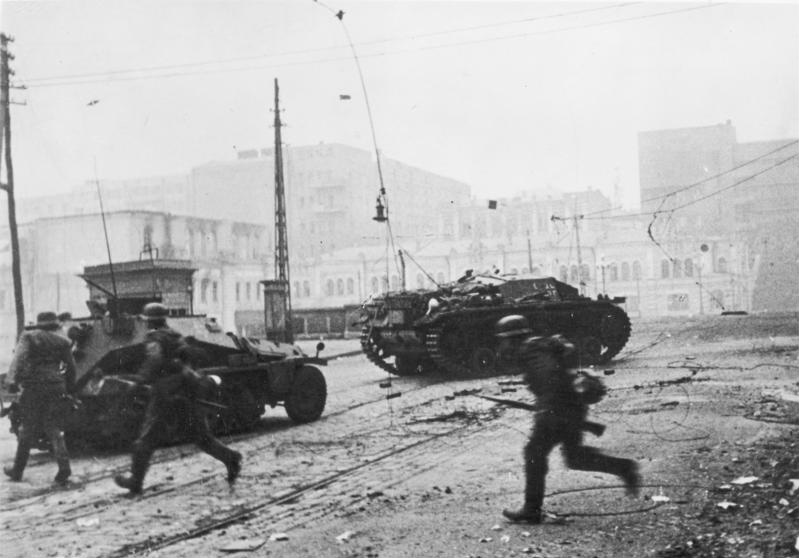
Germans battle Soviet defenders on the streets of Kharkov, 25 October 1941.

After operations at Kiev were successfully concluded, Army Group South advanced east and south to capture the industrial Donbas region and the Crimea. The Soviet Southern Front launched an attack on 26 September, with two armies on the northern shores of the Sea of Azov against elements of the German 11th Army, which was simultaneously advancing into the Crimea. On 1 October, the 1st Panzer Army under Ewald von Kleist swept south to encircle the two attacking Soviet armies. By 7 October, the Soviet 9th and 18th Armies were cut off, and four days later they had been destroyed. The Soviet defeat was total: 106,332 men captured, 212 tanks destroyed or captured in the pocket alone, as well as 766 artillery pieces of all types. The death or capture of two-thirds of all Southern Front troops in four days unhinged the Front's left flank, allowing the Germans to capture Kharkov on 24 October. Kleist's 1st Panzer Army took the Donbas region that same month.

=== Central and northern Finland ===
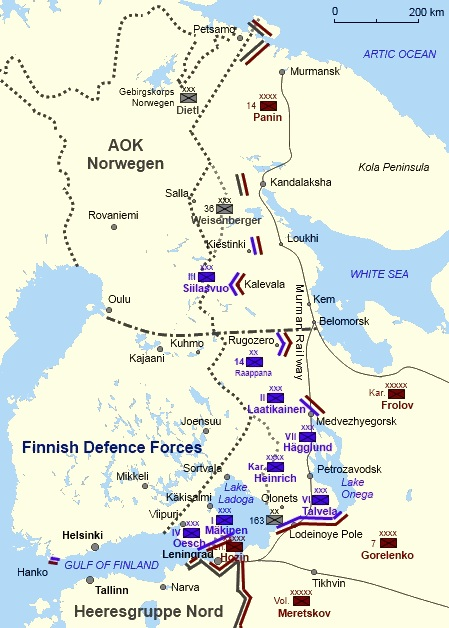
The front in Finland, December 1941

In central Finland, the German-Finnish advance on the Murmansk railway had been resumed at Kayraly. A large encirclement from the north and the south trapped the defending Soviet corps and allowed the XXXVI Corps to advance further to the east. In early September it reached the old 1939 Soviet border fortifications. On 6 September the first Soviet defence line at the Voyta River was breached, but further attacks against the main line at the Verman River failed. With Army Norway switching its main effort further south, the front stalemated in this sector.

Further south, the Finnish III Corps launched a new offensive towards the Murmansk railway on 30 October, bolstered by fresh reinforcements from Army Norway. Despite Soviet resistance, it was able to come within 30 km (19 mi) of the railway. However, the Finnish High Command ordered a stop to all offensive operations in the sector on 17 November due to the United States applying diplomatic pressure on Finland not to disrupt Allied aid shipments to the Soviet Union. With the Finnish refusal to conduct further offensive operations and the German inability to do so alone, the German-Finnish effort in central and northern Finland came to an end.

=== Karelia ===
Germany had pressured Finland to enlarge its offensive activities in Karelia to aid the Germans in their Leningrad operation. Finnish attacks on Leningrad itself remained limited; Finland stopped its advance just short of Leningrad and had no intentions to attack the city, but the situation was different in eastern Karelia. The Finnish government agreed to restart its offensive into Soviet Karelia to reach Lake Onega and the Svir River.

On 4 September, this new drive was launched on a broad front. Although they were reinforced by fresh reserve troops, heavy losses elsewhere on the front meant that the Soviet defenders of the 7th Army were not able to resist the Finnish advance. Olonets was taken on 5 September. On 7 September, Finnish forward units reached the Svir River. Petrozavodsk, the capital city of the Karelo-Finnish SSR, fell on 1 October. From there the Army of Karelia moved north along the shores of Lake Onega to secure the remaining area west of Lake Onega, while simultaneously establishing a defensive position along the Svir River. Slowed by winter's onset, they nevertheless continued to advance slowly during the following weeks. Medvezhyegorsk was captured on 5 December and Povenets fell the next day. On 7 December, Finland halted all offensive operations and went onto the defensive.

== Battle of Moscow ==
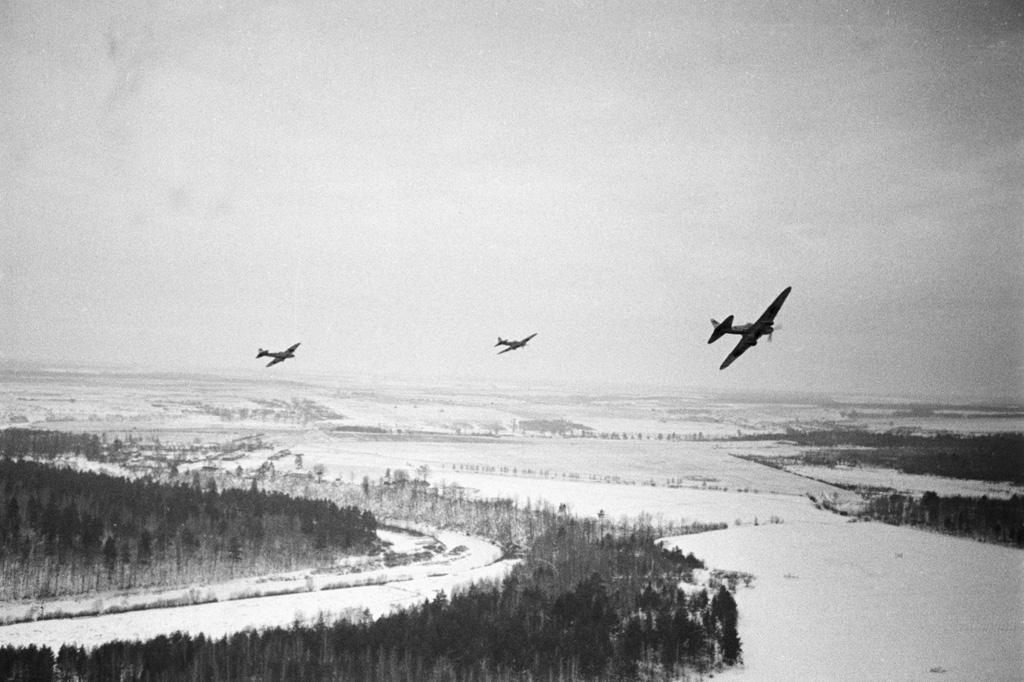
Soviet Ilyushin Il-2s flying over German positions near Moscow

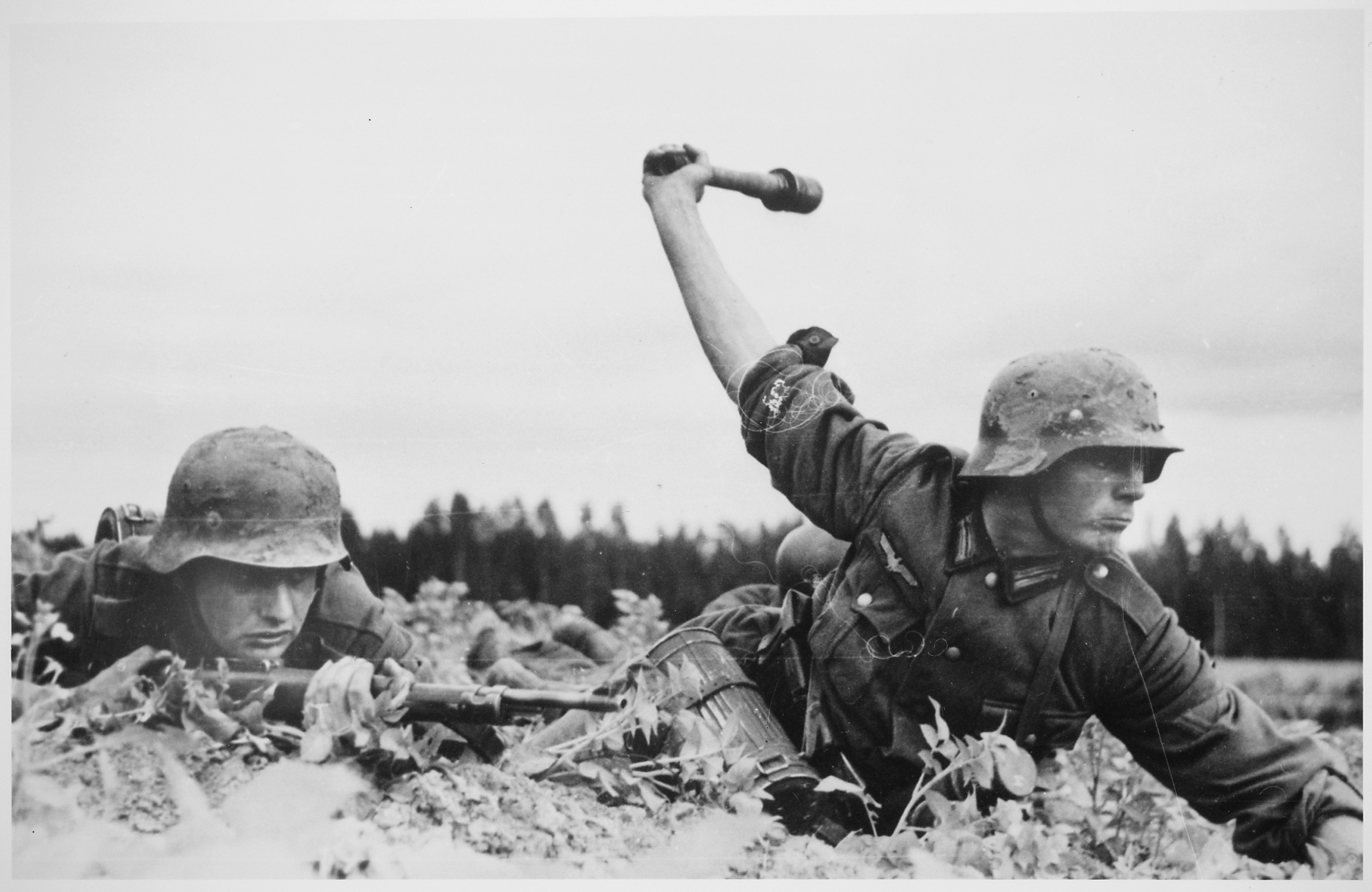
German soldier ready to throw a Stielhandgranate 24, 1941

After Kiev, the Red Army no longer outnumbered the Germans, and there were no more trained reserves directly available. To defend Moscow, Stalin could field 800,000 men in 83 divisions, but no more than 25 divisions were fully effective. Operation Typhoon, the German drive to Moscow, began on 30 September 1941. In front of Army Group Centre was a series of elaborate defence lines, the first centred on Vyazma and the second on Mozhaysk. Russian peasants began fleeing ahead of the advancing German units, burning their harvested crops, driving their cattle away, and destroying buildings in their villages as part of a scorched-earth policy designed to deny to the Nazi war machine needed supplies and foodstuffs.

The first blow took the Soviets completely by surprise when the 2nd Panzer Group, returning from the south, took Oryol, just 121 km (75 mi) south of the Soviet first main defence line. Three days later, the Panzers pushed on to Bryansk, while the 2nd Army attacked from the west. The Soviet 3rd and 13th Armies were now encircled. To the north, the 3rd and 4th Panzer Armies attacked Vyazma, trapping the 19th, 20th, 24th and 32nd Armies. Moscow's first line of defence had been shattered. The pocket eventually yielded over 500,000 Soviet prisoners, bringing the tally since the start of the invasion to three million. The Soviets now had only 90,000 men and 150 tanks left for the defence of Moscow.

The German government now publicly predicted the imminent capture of Moscow and convinced foreign correspondents of an impending Soviet collapse. On 13 October, the 3rd Panzer Group penetrated to within 140 km (87 mi) of the capital. Martial law was declared in Moscow. Almost from the beginning of Operation Typhoon, however, the weather worsened. Temperatures fell, and there was continued rainfall. This turned the unpaved road network into mud, and slowed the German advance on Moscow. Snow fell, which was followed by more rain, creating a glutinous mud that German tanks had difficulty traversing, while the Soviet T-34, with its wider tread, had an easier time navigating. At the same time, the supply situation for the Germans rapidly deteriorated. On 31 October, the German Army High Command ordered a halt to Operation Typhoon while the armies were reorganised. The pause gave the Soviets, far better supplied, time to consolidate their positions and organise formations of newly activated reservists. In little over a month, the Soviets organised eleven new armies that included 30 divisions of Siberian troops. These had been freed from the Soviet Far East, after Soviet intelligence assured Stalin that there was no longer a threat from Imperial Japan. During October and November 1941, over 1,000 tanks and 1,000 aircraft arrived along with the Siberian forces to assist in defending Moscow.

With the ground hardening due to the cold weather, (Note: On 12 November 1941 the temperature around Moscow was −12 °C (10 °F).) the Germans resumed the attack on Moscow on 15 November. Although the troops were now able to advance again, there had been no improvement in the supply situation; only 135,000 of the 600,000 trucks that had been available on 22 June 1941 were available by 15 November 1941. Ammunition and fuel supplies were prioritised over food and winter clothing, so many German troops looted what supplies they could from local populations, but even that was inadequate.

Facing the Germans were the 5th, 16th, 30th, 43rd, 49th, and 50th Soviet Armies. The Germans intended to move the 3rd and 4th Panzer Armies across the Moscow Canal and envelop Moscow from the northeast. The 2nd Panzer Group would attack Tula, and then close on Moscow from the south. As the Soviets reacted to their flanks, the 4th Army would attack the centre.

Over two weeks of fighting, lacking sufficient fuel and ammunition, the Germans crept slowly towards Moscow. In the south, the 2nd Panzer Group was being blocked: on 22 November, Soviet Siberian units, augmented by the 49th and 50th Soviet Armies, attacked the 2nd Panzer Group and inflicted a defeat on the Germans. The 4th Panzer Group pushed the Soviet 16th Army back, however, and succeeded in crossing the Moscow Canal in an attempt to encircle Moscow.

The German position of advances up to the end of Operation Typhoon, 5 December 1941

On 2 December, part of the 258th Infantry Division advanced to within 24 km (15 mi) of Moscow. They were so close that German officers claimed they could see the spires of the Kremlin, but by then the blizzards had begun. A reconnaissance battalion managed to reach the town of Khimki, only about 8 km (5.0 mi) from the Soviet capital. It captured the bridge over the Moscow-Volga Canal, as well as the railway station, which marked the easternmost advance of German forces.

In spite of the progress made, the Wehrmacht was not equipped for such severe winter warfare. The Soviet army was better adapted to fighting in winter conditions, but faced production shortages of winter clothing. The German forces fared worse, with deep snow further hindering equipment and mobility. Weather conditions had largely grounded the Luftwaffe, preventing large-scale air operations.

Newly created Soviet units near Moscow now numbered over 500,000 men, who, despite their inexperience, were able to halt the German offensive by 5 December due to superior defensive fortifications, the presence of skilled and experienced leadership like Zhukov, and the poor German situation. On 5 December, the Soviet defenders launched a massive counterattack consisting of some 1.1 million men and 58 divisions as part of the Soviet winter counteroffensive; the offensive halted on 7 January 1942, after having pushed the German armies back 100–250 km (62–155 mi) from Moscow. The Wehrmacht had lost the battle for Moscow, and the invasion had cost the German Army over 830,000 men.

== Aftermath ==
With the failure of the Battle of Moscow, all German plans for a quick defeat of the Soviet Union had to be revised. The Soviet counter-offensives in December 1941 caused heavy casualties on both sides, but ultimately eliminated the German threat to Moscow. Attempting to explain matters, Hitler issued Führer Directive No. 39, which cited the early onset of winter and the severe cold as the primary reasons for the failed campaign, whereas the real reasons were German military unpreparedness, poor intelligence of actual Soviet strength, extensive logistical difficulties, high levels of attrition, heavy casualties, and overextension of German forces within the vast Soviet territories. On 22 June 1941, the Heer as a whole had 209 divisions at its disposal, 163 of which were offensively capable. On 31 March 1942, less than one year after the invasion of the Soviet Union, the army was reduced to fielding 58 offensively capable divisions. The Red Army's tenacity and ability to counter-attack effectively took the Germans as much by surprise as their own initial attack had the Soviets. Spurred on by the successful defence, and in an effort to imitate the Germans, Stalin wanted to begin his own counteroffensive, not just against the German forces around Moscow, but against their armies in the north and south. Anger over the failed German offensives caused Hitler to relieve Brauchitsch of command and in his place, Hitler assumed personal control of the German Army on 19 December 1941, a decision that would progressively prove fatal to Germany's war effort and contribute to its eventual defeat.

The Soviet Union had also suffered heavily from the conflict, losing huge tracts of territory, and suffering vast losses of men and materiel. Nonetheless, the Red Army proved capable of countering the German offensives, particularly as the Germans began experiencing irreplaceable shortages in manpower, armaments, provisions, and fuel.

=== Subsequent German offensives ===
Despite the rapid relocation of Red Army armaments production east of the Urals and a dramatic increase of production in 1942, especially of armour, new aircraft types and artillery, the Heer (German army) was able to mount another large-scale offensive in June 1942, although on a much reduced front than the previous summer. Hitler, having realised that Germany's oil supply was severely depleted, attempted to utilise Army Group South to capture the oil fields of Baku in the new offensive, codenamed Case Blue. Again, the Germans quickly overran great expanses of Soviet territory, but they failed to achieve their ultimate goal of the oil fields of Baku, culminating in their disastrous defeat at the Battle of Stalingrad in February 1943 and withdrawal from the Caucasus.

By 1943, Soviet armaments production was fully operational and increasingly outproducing the German war economy. The final major German offensive in the Eastern theatre of World War II took place during July–August 1943 with the launch of Operation Citadel, an assault on the Kursk salient. Approximately one million German troops confronted a Soviet force over 2.5 million strong. The Soviets, well aware of the attack in advance and fully prepared for it, prevailed in the Battle of Kursk. Following the German defeat, the Soviets launched Operation Kutuzov, a counter-offensive employing six million men along a 2,400-kilometre (1,500 mi) front towards the Dnieper River as they drove the Germans westwards.

Employing increasingly ambitious and tactically sophisticated offensives, along with making operational improvements in secrecy and deception, by the summer of 1944, the Red Army was eventually able to regain much of the area previously conquered by the Germans. The destruction of Army Group Centre, the outcome of Operation Bagration in 1944, proved to be a decisive success, and additional Soviet offensives against the German Army Groups North and South in the autumn of 1944 put the German war machine into further retreat. By January 1945, what had been the Eastern Front was now controlled by the Soviets, whose military might was aimed at the German capital of Berlin. Hitler committed suicide on 30 April 1945 in order to avoid capture by the Soviets, and the war in Europe finally ended with the total defeat and capitulation of Nazi Germany in May 1945.

== War crimes ==
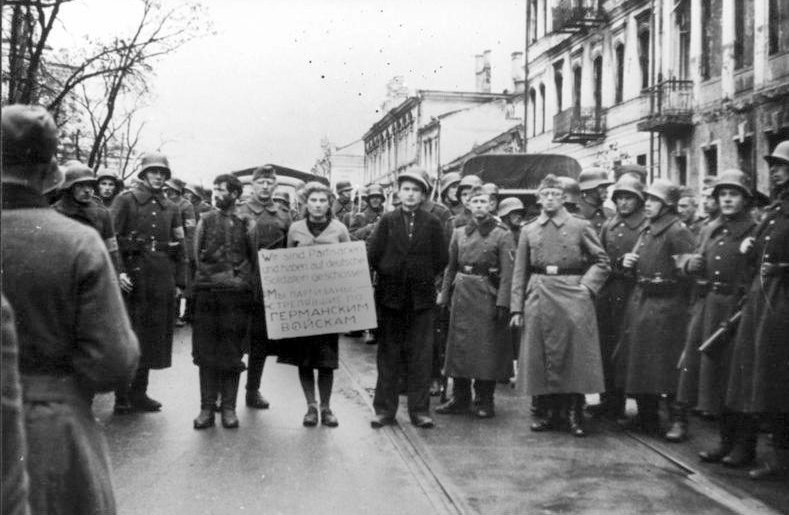
Masha Bruskina, a nurse with the Soviet resistance, before her execution by hanging. The placard reads: We are the partisans who shot German troops, Minsk, 26 October 1941.

While the Soviet Union had not signed the Geneva Convention, Germany had signed the treaty and was thus obligated to offer Soviet POWs humane treatment according to its provisions (as they generally did with other Allied POWs). According to the Soviets, they had not signed the Geneva Conventions in 1929 due to Article 9 which, by imposing racial segregation of POWs into different camps, contravened the Soviet constitution. Article 82 of the convention specified that, "In case, in time of war, one of the belligerents is not a party to the Convention, its provisions shall nevertheless remain in force as between the belligerents who are parties thereto." Despite such mandates, Hitler called for the battle against the Soviet Union to be a "struggle for existence" and emphasized that the Soviet armies were to be "annihilated", a mindset that contributed to war crimes against Soviet prisoners of war. A memorandum from 16 July 1941, recorded by Martin Bormann, quotes Hitler saying, "The giant [occupied] area must naturally be pacified as quickly as possible; this will happen at best if anyone who just looks funny should be shot." Even if the Soviets had signed the Convention, it is highly unlikely that this would have stopped the Nazis' genocidal policies towards combatants, civilians, and prisoners of war.

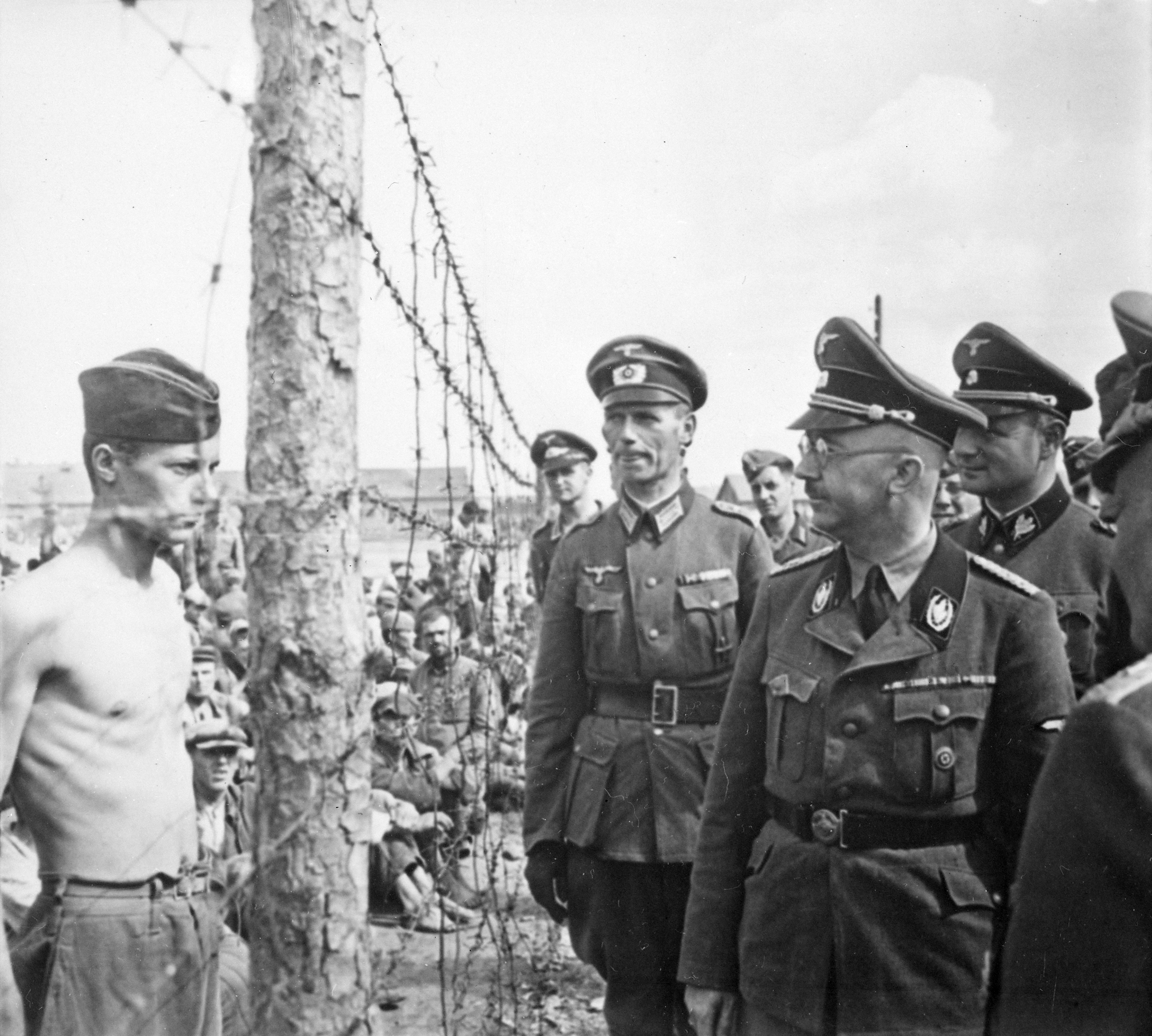
Himmler inspecting a prisoner of war camp

Before the war, Hitler had issued the notorious Commissar Order, which called for all Soviet political commissars taken prisoner at the front to be shot immediately without trial. German soldiers participated in these mass killings, along with members of the SS-Einsatzgruppen, sometimes reluctantly, claiming "military necessity." On the eve of the invasion, German soldiers were informed that their battle "demands ruthless and vigorous measures against Bolshevik inciters, guerrillas, saboteurs, Jews and the complete elimination of all active and passive resistance." Collective punishment was authorised against partisan attacks; if a perpetrator could not be quickly identified, burning villages and mass executions were considered acceptable reprisals. Although the majority of German soldiers accepted these crimes as justified due to Nazi propaganda, which depicted the Red Army as Untermenschen, a few prominent German officers openly protested against them. An estimated two million Soviet prisoners of war died of starvation during Barbarossa alone. By the end of the war, 58 percent of all Soviet prisoners of war had died in German captivity.

Organised crimes against civilians, including women and children, were carried out on a massive scale by the German police and military forces, as well as the local collaborators. Under the command of the Reich Security Main Office, the Einsatzgruppen killing squads conducted large-scale massacres of Jews and communists in conquered Soviet territories. Holocaust historian Raul Hilberg puts the number of Jews murdered by "mobile killing operations" at 1,400,000. The original instructions to kill "Jews in party and state positions" were broadened to include "all male Jews of military age" and then expanded once more to "all male Jews regardless of age". By the end of July, the Germans were regularly killing women and children. On 18 December 1941, Himmler and Hitler discussed the "Jewish question", and Himmler noted the meeting's result in his appointment book: "To be annihilated as partisans". According to Christopher Browning, "annihilating Jews and solving the so-called 'Jewish question' under the cover of killing partisans was the agreed-upon convention between Hitler and Himmler." In accordance with Nazi policies against "inferior" Asian peoples, Turkmens were also persecuted. According to a post-war report by Prince Veli Kajum Khan, they were imprisoned in concentration camps in terrible conditions, where those deemed to have "Mongolian" features were murdered daily. Asians were also targeted by the Einsatzgruppen and were the subjects of lethal medical experiments and murder at a "pathological institute" in Kiev. Hitler received reports of the mass killings conducted by the Einsatzgruppen which were first conveyed to the RSHA, where they were aggregated into a summary report by Gestapo Chief Heinrich Müller.

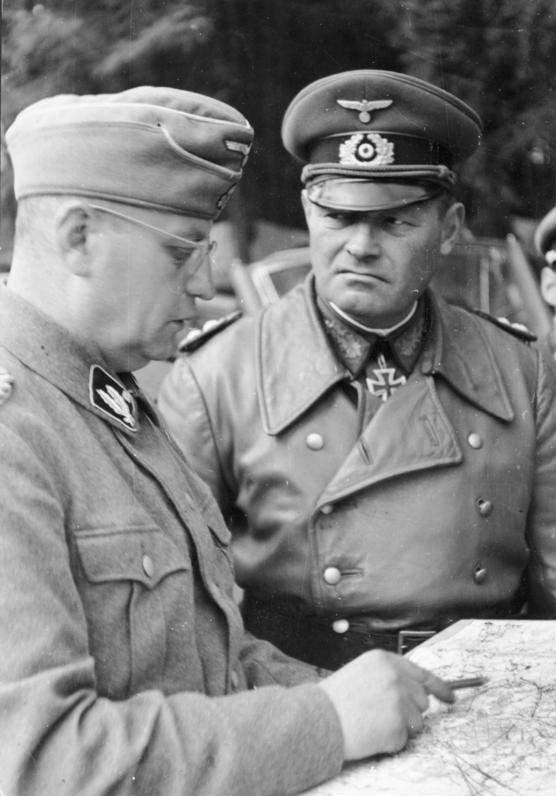
General Erich Hoepner (right) with commander of SS Polizei Division, Walter Krüger, in October 1941

Burning houses suspected of being partisan meeting places and poisoning water wells became common practice for soldiers of the German 9th Army. At Kharkov, the fourth largest city in the Soviet Union, food was provided only to the small number of civilians who worked for the Germans, with the rest designated to slowly starve. Thousands of Soviets were deported to Germany for use as slave labour beginning in 1942.

The citizens of Leningrad were subjected to heavy bombardment and a siege that lasted 872 days and starved more than a million people to death, of whom approximately 400,000 were children below the age of 14. The German-Finnish blockade cut off access to food, fuel and raw materials, and rations reached a low, for the non-working population, of 4 ounces (110 g) (five thin slices) of bread and a little watery soup per day. Starving Soviet civilians began to eat their domestic animals, along with hair tonic and Vaseline. Some desperate citizens resorted to cannibalism; Soviet records list 2,000 people arrested for "the use of human meat as food" during the siege, 886 of them during the first winter of 1941–42. The Wehrmacht planned to seal off Leningrad, starve out the population, and then demolish the city entirely.

=== Sexual violence ===
Rape was widespread in the East as German soldiers regularly committed violent sexual acts against Soviet women. Whole units were occasionally involved in the crime, with more than one third of the instances being gang rape. Historian Hannes Heer relates that in the world of the eastern front, where the German Army equated Russia with Communism, everything was "fair game;" thus, rape went unreported unless entire units were involved. Such instances of sexual violence proved part of a wider pattern of racial and gendered terror: Jewish women and girls, in particular, were subject to rape and other abuses by Wehrmacht, SS, police units, and occupation authorities. These crimes were rarely punished, creating a permissive environment where sexual violence became a normalized element of genocidal operations. Historian Regina Mühlhäuser's findings underscore the systematic nature of these crimes and the complicity of regular soldiers.

Frequently, in the case of Jewish women, the victims were murdered immediately after acts of sexual violence. Historian Birgit Beck emphasizes that military decrees, which served to authorise wholesale brutality on many levels, essentially destroyed the basis for any prosecution of sexual offenses committed by German soldiers in the East. She also contends that detection of such instances was limited by the fact that sexual violence was often inflicted in the context of billets in civilian housing.

== Occupation and resistance ==
=== Propaganda and the illusion of benevolent occupation ===
In late 1941 and especially throughout 1942, the German occupation administration ramped up propaganda efforts aimed at Soviet civilians. Promises of land reform, religious freedom, and liberation from Bolshevism were common themes. These efforts were most intense in Ukraine, where German authorities sought to portray themselves as liberators. However, the stark contradiction between propaganda and the reality of forced labor, food requisitions, mass executions, and repression rapidly eroded their credibility.

=== Local collaboration and resistance ===
During the Nazi campaign eastward, local collaboration and resistance was ambivalent, dynamic and contingent on circumstances. In occupied Soviet territories, collaborators ranged from auxiliary police and administrative staff to military volunteers. As German occupation policies became increasingly brutal, some of these individuals and units defected to the Soviet partisans. The shifting nature of loyalty, often driven by pragmatic survival rather than ideology, complicates simplistic narratives of collaboration or resistance.

A US Army report from 1951, consisting of information gleaned from German military officers, indicated that Army Group Centre initially established good relations with the population in Belarus. According to the report, local inhabitants were friendly and cooperative, and industrial and agricultural production continued for the benefit of both civilians and the occupying forces. Offences against German personnel, though tried in military courts, were handled in consultation with local authorities. From the winter of 1941, however, Soviet partisan activity became more organized, and under the combined pressure of reprisals and renewed propaganda for "Mother Russia," civilian cooperation declined.

== Nazi plunder of Eastern Europe ==
After the start of Operation Barbarossa, Eastern Europe was relentlessly plundered by Nazi German forces. In 1943 alone, 9,000,000 tons of cereals, 2,000,000 t (2,000,000 long tons; 2,200,000 short tons) of fodder, 3,000,000 t (3,000,000 long tons; 3,300,000 short tons) of potatoes, and 662,000 t (652,000 long tons; 730,000 short tons) of meats were sent back to Germany. During the course of the German occupation, some 12 million pigs and 13 million sheep were seized by Nazi forces. The value of this plunder is estimated at 4 billion Reichsmarks. This relatively low number in comparison to the occupied nations of Western Europe can be attributed to the indiscriminate scorched-earth policy pursued by Nazi Germany in the Eastern Front.

== Historical significance ==
Barbarossa was the largest military operation in history—more men, tanks, guns and aircraft were deployed than in any other offensive. The invasion opened the Eastern Front, the war's largest theatre, which saw clashes of unprecedented violence and destruction for four years and killed over 26 million Soviet people, including about 8.6 million Red Army soldiers. More died fighting on the Eastern Front than in all other fighting across the globe during World War II. Damage to both the economy and landscape was enormous, as approximately 1,710 Soviet towns and 70,000 villages were razed.

Barbarossa and the subsequent German defeat changed the political landscape of Europe, dividing it into Eastern and Western blocs. The political vacuum left in the eastern half of the continent was filled by the USSR when Stalin secured his territorial prizes of 1944–1945 and firmly placed the Red Army in Bulgaria, Romania, Hungary, Poland, Czechoslovakia, and the eastern half of Germany. Stalin's fear of resurgent German power and his distrust of his erstwhile allies contributed to Soviet pan-Slavic initiatives and a subsequent alliance of Slavic states. The historians David Glantz and Jonathan House assert that Barbarossa influenced not only Stalin but subsequent Soviet leaders, claiming it "colored" their strategic mindsets for the "next four decades." (Note: Glantz and House use the expression "The Great Patriotic War", the Soviet name for World War II—but this term represents by and large, the contest between the U.S.S.R. and Nazi Germany.) As a result, the Soviets instigated the creation of "an elaborate system of buffer and client states, designed to insulate the Soviet Union from any possible future attack." In the ensuing Cold War, Eastern Europe became a Soviet sphere of influence, (Note: The Soviet Union's success in the Second World War proved its "solidity" and substanitally broadened its global influence.) and Western Europe aligned itself with the United States.

== See also ==
- A–A line
- Black Sea campaigns
  - Romanian Navy during World War II
- Final Solution
- Kantokuen
- Lend-Lease
- Operation Silver Fox
- Order No. 270
- Satellite state § Post-World War II
- Charles Thau
- Timeline of the Eastern Front of World War II
