= Dmitry Pavlov (general) =

Soviet army general (1897–1941)

- Дми́трий Па́влов
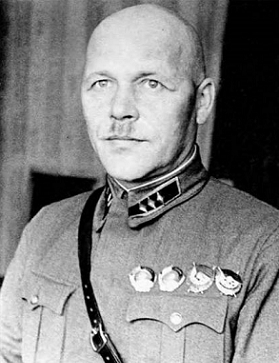
- Pavlov in 1938
- Born: 4 November [O.S. 23 October] 1897; Village of Vonyukh (now Pavlovo, Kologrivsky district), Kologrivsky District, Kostroma Governorate, Russian Empire
- Died: 22 July 1941 (aged 43); Moscow, Russian SFSR, Soviet Union
- Cause of death: Execution by shooting
- Military career
- Allegiance: Russian Empire (1916–1917); Russian SFSR (1917–1922); Soviet Union (1922–1941)
- Service years: 1916–1941
- Rank: General of the Army
- Commands: Western Special Military District; Western Front
- Conflicts: World War I; Russian Civil War; Basmachi Movement; Spanish Civil War; Soviet–Japanese Border Wars; World War II; Winter War; Eastern Front; Battle of Białystok–Minsk (executed)
- Awards: Hero of the Soviet Union

Dmitry Grigoryevich Pavlov (Russian: Дми́трий Григо́рьевич Па́влов; 4 November [O.S. 23 October] 1897 – 22 July 1941) was a Soviet general who commanded the key Soviet Western Front during the initial stage of the German invasion of the Soviet Union (Operation Barbarossa) in June 1941. After his forces were heavily defeated within the first few days of the campaign, he was relieved of his command, arrested, charged with military incompetence, and executed.

== Military career ==
Pavlov was a veteran of the First World War, as well as the Russian Civil War, serving in the Red Army since 1919. He graduated from the Frunze Military Academy in 1928. He then commanded various mechanised and cavalry units. As one of the Soviet military advisers, in 1936–37 he took part in the Spanish Civil War on the Republican side (using the nom de guerre Pablo) and commanded a brigade of Soviet tanks, for which he was made a Hero of the Soviet Union. In contrast to many other officers who took part in that war, he was not purged after his return to the Soviet Union, and was made the Head of the Directorate of Tank and Armoured Car Troops of the Red Army which gave him considerable influence on its development. In particular he insisted that tanks be shifted to infantry support roles, which in hindsight turned out to be incorrect. He participated in the Winter War, as well as the border clashes with Japan.

In 1940, Pavlov became the commander of the Western (Belorussian) Special Military District, which became the Soviet Western Front bearing the brunt of German attack during Operation Barbarossa in June 1941. On 22 February 1941, he was one of the first Soviet generals to receive the new rank of General of the Army, inferior only to the rank of Marshal of the Soviet Union.

== Downfall ==
In the fall of 1940, Georgy Zhukov started preparing the plans for the military exercise concerning the defence of the Western border of the Soviet Union, which at this time was pushed further to the west due to the annexation of eastern Poland. In his memoirs, Zhukov reports that in this exercise he commanded the Western or Blue forces – the supposed invasion troops – and his opponent was Colonel General Dmitry Pavlov, the commander of the Eastern or Red forces – the supposed Soviet troops. Zhukov describes the exercise as being similar to actual events during the German invasion. Pavlov's forces, the eastern side, lost the military exercise.

On the night of 21 June 1941, Pavlov was watching a comedy in Kiev when Moscow sent a directive to all military councils in the Western Military Districts of a possible German invasion. Pavlov chose to watch the comedy to its end and this proved to be a fatal mistake in the eyes of his superiors in Moscow. During the first days of Operation Barbarossa his command, Soviet Western Front, suffered a disastrous defeat in the Battle of Białystok–Minsk. During the first days of the invasion, Pavlov was relieved of his command, replaced by Andrey Eremenko (and again by Semyon Timoshenko), arrested and accused of criminal incompetence and treason. He was the only arrested commander of any Soviet front during Operation Barbarossa.

He and his chief of staff Vladimir Klimovskikh were first accused of:

As the members of the anti-Soviet military conspiracy, betrayed the interests of the Motherland, violated the oath of office and damaged the combat power of the Red Army that are crimes under Articles 58-1b, 58-11 RSFSR Criminal Code ... A preliminary judicial investigation and determined that the defendants Pavlov and Klimovskikh being: the first – the commander of the Western Front, and the second – the chief of staff of the same front, during the outbreak of hostilities with the German forces against the Union of Soviet Socialist Republics, showed cowardice, failure of power, mismanagement, allowed the collapse of command and control, surrender of weapons to the enemy without fighting, willful abandonment of military positions by the Red Army, the most disorganized defense of the country and enabled the enemy to break through the front of the Red Army.

Pavlov and his deputies were accused of "failure to perform their duties" rather than treason. On 22 July 1941, the same day the sentence was handed down, Pavlov's property was confiscated, and he was deprived of military rank, shot, and buried in a landfill near Moscow by the NKVD.

Death penalties were also passed down for other commanders of the Western Front, including the Chief of Staff, Major General Vladimir Klimovskikh; the chief of the communications corps, Major General A. T. Grigoriev; the Chief of Artillery, Lieutenant General of Artillery A. Klich; and Air Force Deputy Chief of the Western Front (who, after the suicide of Major General Aviation I.I. Kopets, was, nominally at least, Chief of the Air Force of the Western Front), Major General Aviation A. I. Tayursky. Also, the commander of the 14th Mechanized Corps, Major General Stepan Oborin, was arrested on 8 July and shot. The commander of the 4th Army, Major General Aleksandr Korobkov, was dismissed on 8 July, arrested the next day, and shot on 22 July. On the other hand, Pavlov's deputy commander, Lieutenant General Ivan Boldin, at the head of a small group, became a popular hero at the time after spending 45 days fighting for survival behind enemy lines, and finally, on 10 August, leading a total of 1,650 officers and men through to Soviet lines near Smolensk. Stavka Order No. 270 praised the feat of Boldin's "division".

Pavlov and other commanders of the Western Front were rehabilitated for lack of evidence in 1956. On 25 November 1965, the title of Hero of the Soviet Union, and other honours, were posthumously returned to him. However, it was not until the Gorbachev era that it was declared that Pavlov was not the main culprit in the defeat and that the orders given to him could not have been fulfilled by anyone.
