= Western Front (Soviet Union) =

WW2 Soviet Red Army formation

- Active: 22 June 1941 – March, 1944
- Country: Soviet Union
- Allegiance: Soviet Red Army
- Role: Organize strategic operations
- Size: Frontal area
- Engagements: Battle of Białystok–Minsk, Battle of Smolensk (1941), Battle of Moscow, Rzhev-Sychyovka-Vyazma Front, Battle of Smolensk (1943)

Commanders
- Notable commanders: Dmitry Pavlov, Andrey Yeryomenko, Semyon Timoshenko, Ivan Konev, Georgy Zhukov, Vasily Sokolovsky

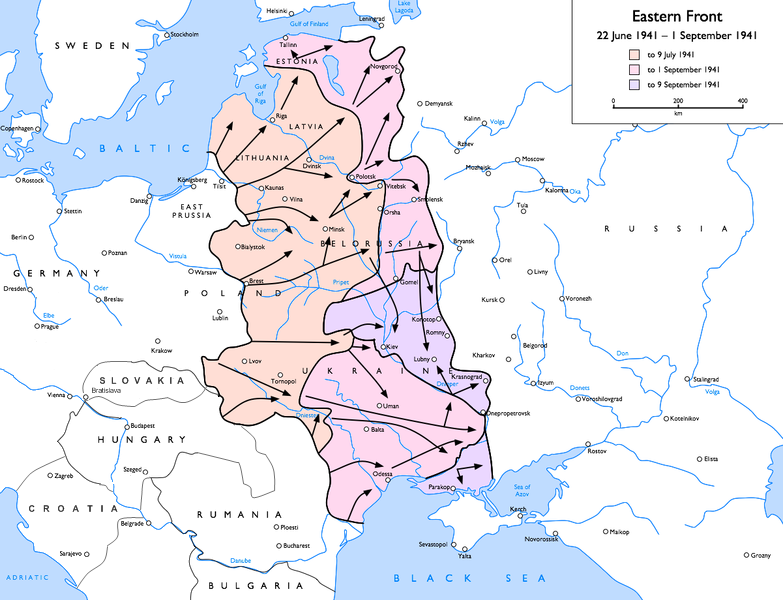
World War II Eastern Front at the beginning of Operation Barbarossa

The Western Front was a front of the Red Army, one of the Red Army Fronts during World War II.

The Western Front was created on 22 June 1941 from the Western Special Military District (which before July 1940 was known as Belorussian Special Military District). The first Front Commander was Dmitry Pavlov (continuing from his position as District Commander since June 1940).

The western boundary of the Front in June 1941 was 470 km (290 mi) long, from the southern border of Lithuania to the Pripyat River and the town of Włodawa. It connected with the adjacent North-Western Front, which extended from the Lithuanian border to the Baltic Sea, and the Southwestern Front in Ukraine.

== Operational history ==
=== Front dispositions 22 June 1941 ===
The 1939 partition of Poland according to the Molotov–Ribbentrop Pact established a new western border with no permanent defense installations, and the army deployment within the Front created weak flanks.

At the outbreak of war with Germany, the Western Special Military District was, in accordance with Soviet pre-war planning, immediately converted into the Western Front, under the District's commander, Army General Dmitry Pavlov. The main forces of the Western Front were concentrated forward along the frontier, organized in three armies. To defend the Białystok salient, the front fielded the 10th Army, under Lieutenant General Konstantin Golubev, supported by the 6th Mechanized Corps and 13th Mechanized Corps, under Major Generals Mikhail Khatskilevich and Pyotr Akhliustin. On the 10th Army's left flank was 4th Army, under Lieutenant General Aleksandr Korobkov, supported by the 14th Mechanized Corps, under Major General Stepan Oborin; and on the right the 3rd Army, under Lieutenant General Vasily Kuznetsov supported by the 11th Mechanized Corps, under Major General Dmitry Karpovich Mostovenko. To the rear was the 13th Army, under Lieutenant General Pyotr Filatov. This army initially existed as a headquarters unit only, with no assigned combat forces.

Among forces of Frontal designation were the 2nd Rifle Corps (100th, 161st Rifle Divisions), 21st Rifle Corps (17th, 24th, 37th Rifle Division), 44th Rifle Corps (64th, 108th Rifle Divisions), 47th Rifle Corps (55th, 121st, 143rd Rifle Divisions), 50th Rifle Division, 4th Airborne Corps (7th, 8th, 214th Airborne Brigades) commanded by Alexey Zhadov at Minsk, and the 58th (Sebezh), 61st (Polotsk), 63rd (Minsk-Slutsky), 64th (Zambrow) and 65th (Mozyr) Fortified Regions. Mechanised forces in reserve included the 20th Mechanized Corps under Major General Andrey Nikitin at Minsk and the 17th Mechanized Corps, under Major General Mikhail Petrov, slightly further forward at Slonim. Altogether, on 22 June the Western Special Military District fielded 671,165 men, 14,171 guns and mortars, 2,900 tanks and 1,812 combat aircraft.

The Western Front was on the main axis of attack by the German Army Group Centre, commanded by Field Marshal Fedor von Bock. German plans for Operation Barbarossa called for the Army Group Centre's Second Panzer Group, under Colonel General Heinz Guderian, to attack south of Brest, advance through Slonim and Baranovichi, turning north-east towards Minsk where it would be met by Colonel General Hermann Hoth's Third Panzer Group, which would attack Vilnius, to the north of the Białystok salient, and then turn south-east. In addition to the two panzer groups. The Army Group Centre also included Field Marshal Günther von Kluge's Fourth Army and Colonel General Adolf Strauss' Ninth Army. Air support was provided by Field Marshal Albert Kesselring's Luftflotte 2 which contained more than half the German aircraft committed to the attack on the Soviet Union.

=== Defeat on the Frontiers 22–28 June ===
The war started disastrously for the Western Front with the Battle of Białystok-Minsk. The German Ninth and Fourth Armies of Army Group Centre penetrated the border north and south of the Białystok salient. The Front's tanks and aviation at airfields were annihilated by German air strikes.

Soviet command and control suffered almost complete breakdown. Worst hit was the 4th Army, which failed to establish communications with headquarters both above and below it. Attempts to launch a counter-attack with the 10th Army on 23 June were unsuccessful. That same day the German Third Panzer Group captured Vilnius after outflanking the 3rd Army. On 24 June, Pavlov again attempted to organize a counter-attack, assigning his deputy Lieutenant General Ivan Boldin the command of the 6th and 11th Mechanized Corps and the 6th Cavalry Corps, commanded by Major General Ivan Semenovich Nikitin. With this mobile force Boldin was to attack northward from the Białystok region towards Grodno to prevent encirclement of Soviet forces in the salient.

This attempted counter-attack was also fruitless. Almost without any interference from Soviet fighters, the close support aircraft of Germany's 8th Air Corps were able to break the backbone of Western Front's counter-attack at Grodno. The 6th Cavalry Corps was so badly mauled by this aerial onslaught against its columns that it was unable to deploy for attack. Jagdgeschwader 53's Hermann Neuhoff recalled:

We found the main roads in the area heavily congested with Russian vehicles of all kinds, but no fighter opposition and very little flak. We made one firing pass after another and caused terrible destruction on the ground. Literally everything was ablaze by the time we turned for home. This air operation continued until nightfall on 24th June, resulting in 105 tanks reportedly destroyed by German aircraft. Particularly successful attacks were made by the Dornier Do 17's of KG 2. In effect Pavlov's counter-attack was completely routed.

Of the 6th Mechanized Corps' 1,212 tanks, only about 200 reached their assembly areas due to air attacks and mechanical breakdowns, and even they ran out of fuel by the end of the day. The same fate awaited the 243 tanks of the 11th Mechanized Corps, ordered to attack towards Grodno on 25 June. The 6th Cavalry Corps suffered 50% casualties and its commander, Nikitin, was captured. The attempted attack allowed many Soviet forces to escape from the Białystok region towards Minsk, but this brought only temporary relief. With both the German Second and Third Panzer Groups racing towards Minsk on the Western Front's southern and northern flanks, a new encirclement threatened.

In the evening of 25 June, the German 47th Panzer Corps cut between Slonim and Vawkavysk, forcing the attempted withdrawal of troops in the salient to avoid encirclement and opening the southern approaches to Minsk.

Pavlov dispatched orders to disengage and withdraw into new defences behind the Shchara River, but the few units receiving the orders were unable to break contact with the enemy. Hounded by constant air attacks, Pavlov's forces fled eastward on foot. Most of the 10th Army was not able to cross the river because the bridges over the Shchara were destroyed by air attacks. Further east, the 13th Army, which had received orders to assemble various withdrawing forces into the defence of Minsk, had its headquarters ambushed by German spearheads and its defence plans captured. Pavlov then ordered his 20th Mechanized and 4th Airborne Corps, until then held in reserve, to halt the Germans at Slutsk. However the 20th Mechanized Corps had only 93 older tanks and the 4th Airborne had to deploy on foot from lack of aircraft. Neither proved any threat to the advancing Second Panzer Group.

On 27 June 1941, the German Second and Third Panzer Groups striking from south and north linked up near Minsk, surrounding and eventually destroying the Soviet 3rd, 10th and 13th Armies, and portions of the 4th Army, in total about 20 divisions, while the remainder of the 4th Army fell back eastwards toward the Berezina River. On 28 June 1941, the Ninth and Fourth German Armies linked east of Białystok splitting the encircled Soviet forces into two pockets: a larger Białystok pocket containing the Soviet 10th Army and a smaller Navahrudak pocket.

In the first 18 days of the war, the Western Front had suffered 417,790 casualties, lost 9,427 guns and mortars, 4,799 tanks and 1,777 combat aircraft, and practically ceased to exist as a military force.

The Front commander, General of the Army Dmitry Pavlov, and the Front Staff were recalled to Moscow. There they were accused of intentional disorganization of defense and retreat without battle, sentenced as traitors, and executed. The families of the traitors were repressed according to NKVD Order no. 00486. This order dealt with families of traitors of the Motherland. (They were rehabilitated in 1956.)

=== Western Front reorganized 28 June – 2 July ===
Furious over the loss of Minsk on 28 June, Stalin replaced the disgraced Pavlov with Colonel General Andrey Yeryomenko as commander of the Western Front. Arriving at Front headquarters at Mogilev on the morning of 29 June, Yeryomenko was faced with the daunting task of restoring order to the Western Front's defences. To accomplish this task he had initially only the remnants of the 4th and 13th Armies, of which the former had been reduced to the equivalent of a division in strength. On 1 July, he ordered the 13th Army to fall back to the Berezina River and defend the sectors between the towns of Kholkolnitza, Borisov and Brodets. Further south, the 4th Army were to defend the Berezina from Brodets through Svisloch to Bobruisk. To reinforce the Front's defences the elite 1st Moscow Motor Rifle Division was rushed from Moscow Military District to Borisov. This division, commanded by Colonel Yakov Kreizer, was at full strength with two motorized regiments, one tank regiment and 229 tanks. However, by that date Yeryomenko's defense line on the Berezina had already been rendered obsolete by Guderian's Panzer Divisions. On 29 June, the 3rd Panzer Division captured a bridgehead at Bobruisk from the 4th Army's 47th Rifle Corps, and on 30 June, the 4th Panzer Division seized the railroad bridge at Svisloch from the 4th Airborne Corps, cutting off one of that corps' three brigades and most of the 20th Mechanized Corps.

Then on 2 July Stalin appointed Semyon Timoshenko, Marshal of the Soviet Union and People's Commissar for Defence, to command the Western Front, with Yeryomenko and Marshal Semyon Budyonny as his deputies. At the same time Stalin transferred four armies, the 19th Army, 20th Army, 21st Army and 22nd Army, from Marshal Budyonny's Group of Reserve Armies to the Western Front. After a telephone conversation with Timoshenko, Stalin added a fifth reserve army, the weak 16th Army, as well.

Timoshenko's orders were to defend the Western Dvina River-Dniepr River line. To this end the front deployed on its northern flank the 22nd Army under Lieutenant General Filipp Yershakov to defend the sector from Sebezh southward to the Western Dvina, and then south along that river from north of Polotsk to Beshenkovichi. South of the 22nd Army, the 20th Army, under Lieutenant General Pavel Kurochkin, was to defend the gap between the rivers from Beshenkovichi on the Western Dvina to Shklov on the Dnepr, supported by the 5th Mechanized Corps, under Major General Ilya Alekseyenko, and the 7th Mechanized Corps, under Major General Vasilii Ivanovich Vinogradov. The 19th Army, under Lieutenant General Ivan Konev, that time regrouping northward from the Kiev region, was to defend the Vitebsk region to the rear of 22nd and 20th Armies. The 19th Army included the 23rd Mechanized Corps under Major General Mikhail Akimovich Miasnikov. On the front's southern flank the 21st Army, under Lieutenant General Vasyl Herasymenko, including the 25th Mechanized Corps under Major General Semyon Krivoshein, was to defend the sector from Rogachev to Rechitsa. The remnants of the 4th and 13th Armies were to fall back and regroup at the Sozh River at the rear of the 21st Army. In early July Stalin relieved Korobkov, the commander of the 4th Army, and had him executed for treason. He was replaced by Colonel Leonid Sandalov Finally the 16th Army, under Lieutenant General Mikhail Fedorovich Lukin, was kept in reserve in the Smolensk region.

=== German advance to the Dniepr 2–9 July ===
The Western Front had been given a brief respite to erect new defences while the Germans reduced the pockets created during the Białystok-Minsk battles. With the Minsk pocket nearly disintegrated, the German Panzer Groups resumed their offensive against the Western Front on 2 July. On the Front's northern flank, the advance of Hoth's forces was hampered by poor weather. The LVII Motorised Corps made the best progress, but encountered heavy resistance from the Soviet 22nd Army's 62nd Rifle Corps on the approaches to Polotsk, which led the German corps commander, Adolf-Friedrich Kuntzen, to reroute his 19th Panzer Division northward to Disna on the southern bank of the Western Dvina. The XXXIX Motorised Corps, hindered by poor road conditions and resistance from the Soviet 20th Army and 5th and 7th Mechanized Corps, only advanced only as far as Lepel in two days. Further south Borisov, defended by the remnants of the 13th Army and the Borisov Tank School, fell to the 18th Panzer Division of the 2nd Panzer Group's XXXXVII Motorised Corps on 2 July. The Germans captured the road bridge intact despite Yeryomenko's personal instructions that it be destroyed. Timoshenko was ordered by the Stavka (the Soviet High Command) to restore the situation with Kreizer's 1st Moscow Motor Rifle Division. The XXXXVI Motorised Corps also captured a bridgehead across the Berezina on 2 July when the SS Motorized Division Das Reich captured Pogost, but were then for two days hindered by the 13th Army and 4th Army's 4th Airborne and 20th Mechanized Corps. On the southern flank, the remnants of the 4th Army's Rifle Divisions were only able to offer light resistance to the German XXIV Motorised Corps; instead the attackers were repeatedly halted by destroyed bridges at the Berezina, Ola, Dobosna and Drut Rivers.

Kreizer launched his counter-attack against the German bridgehead at Borisov on 3 July, but the defenders had been forewarned by radio intercepts and air reconnaissance, and with their superior tactics beat back this isolated Soviet attack. Defeated, Kreizer accordingly retreated behind the Nacha River and fought during the withdrawal towards Orsha, where his troops were aided by the arrival of the 20th Army. Also on 3 July, the spearheads of the XXIV Motorised Corps reached the rain-swollen Dniepr, with the 3rd Panzer Division arriving at the river north of Rogachev and the 4th Panzer Division advancing to Bykhov. By nightfall the Western Front could report that remnants of the 4th and 13th Armies had been able to retreat across the Dniepr, however hardly anything of the 3rd and 10th Armies remained. Moreover, parts of the 13th Army and 17th Mechanized Corps were still west of the Dniepr. Accordingly, Timoshenko ordered his 21st Army to shore up its defences along the river and help the withdrawal by sending out forces to spoil the German advance. On 4 July, the 19th Panzer Division seized a bridgehead across the Western Dvina at Disna from the defending 51st Rifle Corps of the Soviet 22nd Army, where it was reinforced by the German 18th Motorised Division.

=== The Smolensk pocket ===
The Front took part in the fierce Battle of Smolensk (1941), which managed to disrupt the German blitzkrieg for two months. The Germans successfully encircled and destroyed large parts of the Soviet 16th, 19th, and 20th Armies.

During July the Western Front's area of responsibility was reduced by the formation of the new Central and Reserve Fronts.

Stiffening Soviet resistance in the centre convinced Hitler to put a temporary halt to the advance towards Moscow and divert the Army Group Centre's armour towards Leningrad and Kiev.

=== The Soviet Dukhovshchina Offensive ===
On 17 August, the Western Front launched an offensive towards Dukhovshchina as part of a larger Soviet attempt to counter-attack. However, despite some local successes, the offensive failed to breach the German defenses and the offensive was called off 10 September.

Newly promoted Colonel General Ivan Konev took over command in September when Timoshenko was transferred south to restore the situation in the then ongoing Battle of Kiev.

=== The Vyazma pocket ===
On 2 October, German forces resumed their advance on Moscow with the launch of Operation Typhoon. The Western Front again suffered immense losses when large parts of its forces were encircled near Vyazma.

=== Assault on Moscow ===
When Zhukov took over on 10 October, the Soviet Reserve Front had just been disbanded and its forces incorporated into Western Front, but given the pounding that Soviet forces had suffered, the force numbered only 90,000 men. The 16th Army under Konstantin Rokossovsky held at Volokolamsk, and General L. A. Govorov had the 5th Army, recently raised from 1st Guards Rifle Corps, and soon to include the 32nd Rifle Division at Mozhaisk. The 43rd Army was under General K. D. Golubev at Maloyaroslavets, and the 49th Army was near Kaluga under General I. G. Zakharin. The 49th Army had been formed in August 1941 and was initially assigned to the Reserve Front. On 1 September 1941, the 49th Army comprised the 194th, 220th, and 248th Rifle Divisions, and the 4th Division of the People's Militia. Meanwhile, the 33rd Army was forming at Naro-Fominsk under General Lieutenant M. G. Yefremov, and was to be assigned to Zhukov's command.

The Soviets just managed to halt the German advance in the Battle of Moscow, leading to further furious fighting in the Battles of Rzhev just to the west. In May 1942 the Front's air forces became the 1st Air Army.

=== Later operations in World War II ===
The Front appears to have controlled the three armies - the 5th Army, 33rd Army, and 10th Guards Army - which formed the assault force in the Battle of Smolensk (1943). On 1 August 1943, the 70th Rifle Corps was listed on the Soviet order of battle, as a headquarters with no troops assigned, directly subordinate to the front.

On 24 April 1944, the Front was divided into the 2nd Belorussian Front and 3rd Belorussian Front.

=== Status today ===
Russian ground troops continue the Soviet Army's organizational arrangement of having military districts that have both a wartime territorial administration role and the capability to generate formation headquarters (HQs) to command fronts. This was emphasized by reports of a Moscow Military District exercise in April 2001, when the district's units were to be divided into two groups, "one operating for the western front and the other for the wartime military district".

== Commanders ==
- General of the Army Dmitri G. Pavlov (to 28 June 1941; executed)
- Andrey Yeryomenko (28 June – 2 July 1941)
- Marshal Semyon K. Timoshenko (2 July – September, 1941)
- Lt. General Ivan S. Konev [promoted to Colonel General in September 1941] (September–October 1941; August 1942 – February 1943)
- General Georgy K. Zhukov (October 1941 – August 1942)
- Colonel General V. D. Sokolovsky [promoted to full General in August 1943] (February 1943 – April 1944)
