= 75th Rifle Division =

75th Rifle Division (September 1923 – December 27, 1941) 75th Rifle Division (January 8, 1942 - June 25, 1957)
- Active: 1923–1957
- Country: Soviet Union
- Branch: Red Army (1939-46); Soviet Army (1946–1955)
- Type: Infantry
- Size: Division
- Engagements: Winter War; Operation Barbarossa; Battle of Kiev (1941); Anglo-Soviet occupation of Iran

Commanders
- Notable commanders: Col. Vasilii Ivanovich Repin; Kombrig Zinovii Pavlovich Tishchenko; Kombrig Aleksandr Mikhailovich Stepanov; Maj. Gen. Semyon Ivanovich Nedvigin; Col. Vasilii Leontevich Abramov; Col. Timofei Ivanovich Volkovich; Col. Nikolai Denisovich Ryzhov

The 75th Rifle Division was formed as an infantry division of the Red Army in September 1923, in the Ukrainian Military District, based on the shtat (table of organization and equipment) for rifle divisions of that period. It remained in Ukraine until May 1939, latterly in the Kharkov Military District, before being moved to Leningrad Military District, which became Northwestern Front. During the Winter War with Finland it reinforced 8th Army north of Lake Ladoga, soon after the start of the invasion, but did not distinguish itself. It remained in the Leningrad region until June 1940 when it was moved southwest to the Western Special Military District in Belarus, and at the start of the German invasion on June 22, 1941, it was south of Brest as part of 4th Army. In the initial fighting it was forced southeast and retreated with its Army through the Pripet Marshes, emerging in early July to be assigned to 21st Army in Western Front. After two weeks of defensive battles to the southwest and south of Babruysk it was transferred to the rebuilt 3rd Army in the new Central Front. During August the 75th returned to 21st Army, which was now part of Bryansk Front and in the last week of that month and early September struggled to help hold in the Chernihiv area against the southward thrust of 2nd Panzer Group which would soon encircle Southwestern Front east of Kyiv. It was officially under command of this Front when it was destroyed later in the month, although it would not be officially written off until December 27.

A new 75th was formed in January 1942 in the Transcaucasian Military District. At the end of the month it was moved into Iran as part of the Soviet garrison that had occupied part of the country since the Anglo-Soviet invasion the previous year. It remained in this duty until the Soviet withdrawal until May 1946, after which it continued to serve in the Transcaucasus as a rifle division until it was converted to the 75th Motor Rifle Division in June 1957.

== 1st Formation ==
The 75th was first formed at Poltava in the Ukrainian Military District in September 1923, largely based on a cadre from the 25th Rifle Division, plus other units from various districts. It was under the 25th's command until October 1926 when its own command cadre was separated and the division was moved to Lubny in pursuance of Order No. 348/86. This was completed the next month, at which time its order of battle was as follows:

- 223rd Rifle Regiment (formed at Cherkasy, now stationed at Pyriatyn)
- 224th Rifle Regiment (formed at Poltava, now stationed at Khorol, then Pryluky from 1931)
- 225th Rifle Regiment (formed at Poltava with some cadre from 28th Mountain Rifle Division, now stationed at Lubny)
- 75th Artillery Regiment (now stationed at Myrhorod)
- Signal Company (Signal Battalion in 1932, disbanded April 1938)
- Sapper Company (Sapper Battalion in 1932, disbanded in 1938)
- Cavalry Battalion

In December 1932 the division came under command of Col. Vasilii Ivanovich Repin, who had previously led the 70th Rifle Division before taking command of the Transcaucasus Military Preparatory School. He left the division to further his military education and rose to the rank of lieutenant general on June 4, 1940.

Several changes were made to the 75th's order of battle over the following years. In 1932 a tankette company was formed, which was enlarged to a tank battalion in April 1936. Two years later it was reformed as a tank company. All these were based at Lubny. In December 1934 a reconnaissance battalion was formed from a tank company and a cavalry squadron. This was reorganized in May 1936 but then disbanded in April 1938. An antiaircraft machine gun company was formed in January 1935 and also stationed at Lubny. In April 1938 the 235th Howitzer Artillery Regiment was formed at Lubny, based on a cadre from the division's own 75th Artillery Regiment. Kombrig Zinovii Pavlovich Tishchenko led the division through most of this period until he was arrested on February 19, 1938, during the Great Purge. He would die in prison in 1941 but be rehabilitated on February 8, 1956. Col. Semyon Ivanovich Nedvigin led the division as deputy commander beginning in December, and would remain in this position when Kombrig Aleksandr Mikhailovich Stepanov took full command on April 19, 1939. A month later the 75th left 14th Rifle Corps and began moving north to Ostrov in the Leningrad Military District. At this time it had about 6,500 personnel on strength, but this grew to 8,750 by the end of August.

In September 1939, for security and intelligence reasons, all the rifle divisions had their regiments' numbers "scrambled", and the 75th emerged with the following order of battle:

- 28th Rifle Regiment
- 34th Rifle Regiment
- 115th Rifle Regiment
- 68th Artillery Regiment
- 235th Howitzer Artillery Regiment
- 82nd Antitank Battalion
- 282nd Antiaircraft Battalion
- 54th Reconnaissance Company
- 97th Sapper Battalion
- 75th Signal Battalion
- 110th Medical/Sanitation Battalion
- 31st Chemical Defense (Anti-gas) Platoon
- 69th Motor Transport Battalion
- 49th Field Bakery
- 96th Divisional Artillery Workshop
- 300th Field Postal Station
- 106th Field Office of the State Bank

During this month the division was assigned to 1st Rifle Corps in 8th Army and took up positions along the border with Estonia, not far to the west. In November it began moving east under these commands to Shlisselburg, before moving by truck into Karelia, where the 8th Army was assigned to a sector north of Lake Ladoga.

== Winter War ==
The Soviet invasion of Finland began on November 30. 8th Army was initially under command of Komdiv I. N. Khabarov, who issued orders to 1st Corps on December 4 to advance toward Ilomantsi and Korpiselka. Initial operations, which did not involve the 75th, went so poorly that Khabarov was replaced on December 13 by Komandarm 2nd Rank G. M. Shtern. This did little to stem the counterattacks facing 1st Corps. The 139th Rifle Division was defeated at the Battle of Tolvajärvi on December 12. The fresh 75th, moving toward the front, encountered the survivors retreating toward the border. According to one author, "There is some evidence that the spectacle of the retreating 139th, its men half frozen and burned out, burdened with hundreds of wounded, had a marked effect on the morale of the new men moving west." The division was advancing in the area of Lake Yaglyajärvi but during December 20-21 was partially encircled and forced to retreat to the Aitoyoki River line, losing a good deal of its heavy equipment in the process. Following this the front lines stabilized.

On January 7, 1940, the Leningrad Military District was renamed as Northwestern Front as the Red Army regrouped its war effort. 8th Army's 168th Rifle Division had been encircled near Kitelä in what became known as the Great Motti, and Shtern's new objective was to relieve both it and the 18th Rifle Division. The latter task was given to his 56th Rifle Corps, while the 75th was to secure the left flank of 1st Corps while also capturing the area of Hepolampi, Polvijärvi, and Onkamolampi. The division attacked through January 21-28 but gained only about 2km. In February Stepanov moved to deputy command of 1st Corps and Colonel Nedvigin took full command of the 75th; he would be promoted to Kombrig on March 2, and this would be modernized to major general on June 4.

Early in March the Red Army General Staff ordered Shtern to created a shock group within his Army with the objective of destroying the Finnish forces in and around the village of Loimola and gaining the initiative on this sector. The group consisted of the 75th, 56th, 87th, and 164th Rifle Divisions, 24th and 128th Motorized Divisions, and the headquarters of 14th Corps. The 75th was to advance into the flank and rear of the Finnish fortified area along the north-eastern shore of Lake Suovanjärvi. The operation was a failure. A ceasefire between the two sides began on March 13 as the Moscow Peace Treaty came into effect. By July 30 the 75th was in the Western Special Military District with its headquarters at Mazyr. It had an authorized strength of 12,000 personnel. During April-May 1941 it was moved up toward the frontier, where it was assigned to 28th Rifle Corps of 4th Army. The 4th was under command of Maj. Gen. A. A. Korobkov.

== Operation Barbarossa ==
28th Corps was the only one under 4th Army's command and consisted of the 6th, 42nd, 49th, and 75th Divisions. The 6th and 42nd were grouped around the Brest Fortress while the 75th was farther to the south along the Bug River, facing the XXIV Motorized Corps and the 269th Infantry Division. Korobkov took the initiative to order the distribution of the sealed battle plans to his subordinates just after midnight on June 22 but a communications breakdown at 0200 hours was not repaired until 0330, just before the German artillery began firing. The 3rd Panzer Division made an unopposed crossing of the Bug since General Nedvigin didn't receive orders until after 0400, by which time the 75th had already taken losses from artillery and air attacks. On this first day the Western Special Military District was redesignated as Western Front.

Although elements of 28th Rifle and 235th Howitzer Artillery Regiments were caught in the German advance the bulk of the division was swept aside by the panzers and retreated with the headquarters of 4th Army through the Pripet Marshes south of Minsk. By June 27 it was partially encircled by managed to break out. As of July 1 it was detached from 28th Corps and was under direct Army command. By July 10 it had been reassigned to 21st Army of the same Front. This Army was located north of Gomel and was under command of Col. Gen. F. I. Kuznetsov as of July 12. The previous day the Army was reported as "completing its concentration and defending its previous positions... against an inactive enemy." The 75th had "no new information" to report.

=== Battles in Belarus ===
The commander of Western Front, Marshal S. K. Timoshenko, had prepared a plan to strike the south flank of Army Group Center with 21st Army to retake Babruysk. To this end the 75th was assigned to 66th Rifle Corps, joining the 232nd Rifle Division and a pair of armored trains. On July 13 the Corps was ordered to:

... defend the eastern bank of the Lan' river with the 75th RD and attack along the western bank of the Berezina River with your main forces to capture Bobruisk, prevent the advance of enemy reserves toward Bobruisk, and destroy his forces in piecemeal fashion.

The attack began the same day and, in conjunction with the rest of the Army the 66th Corps crossed the Dniepr between Rechytsa and Loyew and struck the defenses of the forward elements of German 2nd Army's XII Army Corps and began exploiting northwestward toward Babruysk deep in the German rear.

At 2000 hours on July 16 Timoshenko's headquarters reported that the 75th had withdrawn to positions 130-150km southwest of Babruysk along the Sluch River and was engaging the German 40th Infantry Division. There was no information available from the 232nd, but it was later learned that it had made an impressive advance of 80km to the west, capturing bridges over the Berezina and Ptsich Rivers; it was reported at 2000 hours on July 18 as fighting along the Borovaia, Korolev Station, and Sloboda line, 15-22km northwest of Parychy and 20-25km south of Babruysk. This set the stage for a deep cavalry raid by a group of three divisions, but this proved only partially successful. On the same date the 75th was recorded as defending the Sluch along a line from Lenino to Mlynok against the 40th and cavalry. General Nedvigin had been serving jointly as commander of the 232nd since July 1 and on July 20 he left the 75th, being replaced by Col. Alexei Mikhailovich Pirov. This officer in turn would be replaced on July 30 by Col. Sergei Filippovich Pivovarov.

On the morning of July 21 the division was reported as defending Zhytkavichy, 165km south-southwest of Babruysk, trying to prevent its encirclement by the German 45th and 293rd Infantry Divisions. At Timoshenko's insistence, Kuznetsov ordered most of his tired forces to continue to attack. In his orders of 1730 hours on July 22, the 75th was to defend the line Beleva–Naida–Lyaskovichy, 150km south of Babruysk, to prevent any German penetration to the east. The VVS was specifically directed to support the 75th "with small groups of aircraft." The next day, the new Central Front was formed, under command of Kuznetsov, and 66th Corps was transferred to its 3rd Army.

=== Battle of Kyiv ===
A report on July 23 stated the 75th had just ten 76mm cannons available and no other artillery, and no mortars except 50mm and 82mm types. In essence it was a collection of rifle units without any effective fire support. It got a respite for over a month as Army Group Center dealt with the situation around Smolensk. As of August 1 it was still paired with the 232nd in 66th Corps, but toward the end of August the Corps returned to 21st Army, which was now part of Bryansk Front, formed on August 16. In a preliminary to the drive that would eventually encircle Kyiv the XXIV Motorized Corps was advancing toward Konotop and Hlukhiv at this time. On August 27 the Army, which was operating along the western flank of this penetration, reported that the 232nd and 75th were jointly defending the Gornostaevka Station, Iankovka and Skitok line, 65-70km north and northwest of Chernihiv. Meanwhile the Army's main forces were trying to reestablish contact with 13th Army to the northeast. The next day the Army commander, Lt. Gen. V. I. Kuznetsov, was chided by STAVKA representative Marshal B. M. Shaposhnikov for failing to commit 66th Corps to this effort. At this time the Corps also contained the 55th and 266th Rifle Divisions and, as it was his strongest formation, Kuznetsov decided he had to employ it to defend the vital Chernihiv region against the advancing 2nd Army.

Kuznetsov issued orders on August 29 to his Army in which he described the mission of 66th Corps:

... defend the Borovichi Station, Kamka, Petrovka, Dubrovnoe, and Burovka line [north of Chernigov] and relieve the cavalry group in the Zaimishche and Novye Milny sector... The Commanders of the 28th and 66th RCs - prepare stout defenses, with platoon-size trenches and antitank positions, employ regimental and divisional artillery in the infantry's forward positions, and organize coordination with the artillery.

55th Division was in the Snovsk area, the 75th near Berezna, with the 232nd in the space between these two towns, but all three were being forced back to the south and southeast under pressure from XXXXIII Army Corps. Despite the situation on the ground, Bryansk Front continued to issue utterly unrealistic orders for 13th and 21st Armies to go over to the counterattack. By now a 20km-wide gap had opened between the two Armies and the hastily organized 40th Army was proving unable to fill it. By the end of August 30 the remnants of the 232nd and the 75th were reported as "fighting fiercely" at Politichi and Chudovka. Later that day Kuznetsov stated that the 75th had beaten off a German attack from Malyi Sednev. On the same day Colonel Pivovarov left the division, and no official successor was appointed before it was disbanded.

On September 2 the 75th was occupying a line from Leninovka to Begach to Borki, 27-30km northeast of Chernihiv. By now the 2nd Panzer Group was driving south to link up with 1st Panzer Group advancing to the north and the entire group of Soviet forces east of Kyiv, primarily Southwestern Front, was faced with encirclement. 21st Army was coming under increasing pressure from 2nd Army and was hard pressed to retain its hold on the Chernihiv area. As the situation deteriorated by September 10 the disintegrating 66th Corps had been forced to a line running northeast from Vertiivka. By the time the panzer groups liked up on September 16 the remnants of 21st Army were in the vicinity of Pryluky, officially under Southwestern Front. Hopelessly trapped, only individuals and small groups were able to reach friendly lines. In common with most of the divisions destroyed in the pocket it remained on the books until finally written off on December 27.

== 2nd Formation ==
A new 75th was formed during January 8-21, 1942, at Baku in the Transcaucasian Military District, based on a cadre of 1,654 men of the 9th Mountain Rifle Division. It also received 900 men from 51st Army in the Caucasus region and 800 from the 155th Reserve Rifle Brigade at Tbilisi. Once formed its basic order of battle was similar to that of the 1st formation:

- 28th Rifle Regiment
- 115th Rifle Regiment
- 134th Rifle Regiment
- 68th Artillery Regiment

The division had four commanders before the end of the war:

- Col. Vasilii Leontevich Abramov (January 8, 1942 - August 9, 1942)
- Col. Timofei Ivanovich Volkovich (August 10, 1942 - May 18, 1943)
- Col. Nikolai Denisovich Ryzhov (May 19, 1943 - October 17, 1943)
- Col. Semyon Pavlovich Storozhilov (October 19, 1943 - November 1, 1943)

Ryzhov then returned to lead the division until at least the end of the war in Europe.

This formation of the division is sometimes identified in both German and Soviet records as being a mountain division, based on its cadre and its deployment, but this is contrary to its regimental structure and was never an official designation. It was likely more lightly armed than a standard rifle division, given its employment. By the beginning of February it was listed as part of the Forces in Iran, along with the 15th Cavalry Corps. In January 1944 the occupation forces were reorganized as 4th Army, now under Transcaucasus Front, and the 75th became part of the 58th Rifle Corps, along with the 68th Mountain Rifle Division and the 89th and 90th Rifle Brigades. At the beginning of May 1945 it was still serving under these commands.

Postwar, of the forces of 4th Army the STAVKA chose to retain the 75th and the 261st Rifle Divisions in service. The 75th was based at Nakhchivan, Azerbaijan, under the Transcaucasian Military District, until June 25, 1957, when it was converted to the 75th Motor Rifle Division.
