= 4th Army (Soviet Union) =

- 4-я армия
- Active: 1939–1992
- Country: Soviet Union; Azerbaijan SSR
- Branch: Soviet Army
- Type: Combined arms
- Size: Field army two or more Rifle corps
- Part of: Transcaucasian Military District (1950s–1990s)
- Garrison/HQ: Baku (c. 1945–1991)
- Engagements: Operation Barbarossa, others

The 4th Army (Russian: 4-я армия) was a Soviet field army of World War II that served on the Eastern front of World War II and in the Caucasus during the Cold War. It was disbanded after the fall of the Soviet Union, with its divisions being withdrawn to Russia and disbanded.

== World War II ==
=== First Formation ===
The Fourth Army was created in August 1939 in the Belorussian Special Military District from the Bobruisk Army Group as an independent army. In September 1939, the Fourth Army took part in the Soviet invasion of Poland commanded by the future Marshal of Soviet Union V.I. Chuykov, the defender of Stalingrad. Its order of battle in that operation is listed here. Elements of the army, apparently 4th Battalion, 29th Light Tank Brigade, took part in the German–Soviet military parade in Brest-Litovsk on September 22, 1939.

When the German invasion of the Soviet Union commenced on 22 June 1941, the Army was part of the Western Front and had the 28th Rifle Corps (6th Rifle Division and 42nd Rifle Division), 14th Mechanised Corps, and 49th and 75th Rifle Divisions, as well as the 62nd Fortified Region. General Colonel Pavlov, Commander of the Western Front, had decided to redeploy some of 4th Army’s troops early in 1941, and John Erickson wrote that 12th Rifle Division was accordingly moved into Brest, and HQ 14th Mechanised Corps to Kobrin, which in Erickson’s words, ‘deprived 4th Army simultaneously of its reserve and its second echelon.’

It should be clearly understood that John Erickson (historian) was writing in the pre-1990 period when formation designations could be unclear, sometimes to the point of deliberate deception (Soviet 'maskirovka'). According to Sharp the 12th Rifle Division was identified by the Germans on the Western Front, but the unit was assigned to the Far East for the entire war. The formation that appears to have been moved into Brest Fortress was 42nd Rifle Division.

Facing the 4th Army across the Bug River was deployed the German Fourth Army, with twelve infantry divisions and a cavalry division, as well as Panzer Group 2. Some units faced several difficulties; when General Major A.A. Khorobkov, the army commander, saw his officers on 10 June, General Major Stepan Oborin, 14th Mechanised Corps commander, emphasized that more than half his soldiers were untrained recruits, that his artillery had received guns for which there was no ammunition, and that he only had enough lorries to make a quarter of the corps mobile – the rest would have to march.

On the eve of the attack, 4th Army suffered, as did many Soviet formations, from German communication sabotage. Units lost telephone connections, electrical power, and the Brest Fortress lost its water supply. From about 5 am on 22 June fierce fighting began around the Brest fortress, but the seven battalions around the fortress, from 28th Rifle Corps, were undermanned, disorganized, and slow off the mark to man the defences. Despite these deficiencies the final German reduction of the fortress took some time in the face of determined Soviet resistance. By 1600 hours on 22 June, 4th Army HQ was back at Zapruda, whereupon Front HQ ordered that 14th Mechanised Corps be launched in an attack to clear Brest and reach the frontier line. However the Army staff felt the plan had no chance of success, and so it proved; when the attack was launched the next day, only insignificant progress was made. Three days later Western Front ordered a general withdrawal to try to keep the frontier armies out of threatened German encirclement; 4th Army was directed to fall back on a line from Bytin to Pinsk. Further instructions came through from Pavlov after a chance meeting later the same day; to cover the concentration of reserve armies on the Dnieper, 4th Army was to hold the Shchara, the Slutsk ‘fortified district,’ and the Sluch river line. However the Slutsk fortified district, as the district commander reminded Khorobkov, had long ago been instructed to dispatch all its weapons to the Brest fortress (which was continuing to hold). The planned defence was thus practically non-existent, and Slutsk fell on 27 June. The Army took part in the defenses of the area around Babruysk.

At the end of July 1941, the Fourth Army began to dissolve. The Fourth Army's staff members were absorbed into the general staff of the Central Front, and the troops were absorbed into other armies.

==== Composition on 22 June 1941 ====
Commander Lieutenant General Aleksandr Korobkov

28th Rifle Corps – Major General V.S. Popov

6th Rifle Division – Col. M. A. Popsiu-Shapko
42nd Rifle Division – Maj. Gen. I. S. Lazarenko (According to Sharp the 12th RD was identified by the Germans on the Western Front, but the unit was assigned to the Far East for the entire war. 42nd RD was assigned to Brest Fortress at the beginning of Operation Barbarossa.)
49th Rifle Division – Col. C. F. Vasil’ev
75th Rifle Division – Maj. Gen. S. I. Nedvigin

14th Mechanized Corps – Major General S. I. Oborin

22nd Tank Division – Maj. Gen. V. P. Puganov
30th Tank Division – Col. Semen Bogdanov
205th Motorized Division – Col. F. F. Kudjurov

Order of Battle for Operation Barbarossa

=== Second Formation ===
At the end of September 1941, the Fourth Army was formed for the second time, retaining its Independent status until December while remaining in the Reserve of the Supreme High Command (RVGK, the Stavka Reserve). The field staffs of the 52nd and 54th Armies were used to fill the command contingent of the Army. The new formation was made up of the 285th, 292nd, and 311th Rifle Divisions along with the 27th Cavalry Division, a Tank brigade, the 2nd Reserve aviation group, and other artillery and support units.

The Fourth Army participated in the defense and attack of Tikhvin from October to December 1941. On December 17, 1941, the Fourth Army was allocated to the Volkhov Front. From January 1942 to November 1943, the Fourth Army fought on the front in Volkhov and Leningrad while also doing many rear-area duties. Unlike in other parts of the Eastern Front, the Red Army was not making significant gains in the north by 1943.

=== Third Formation ===
The 4th Army was disbanded in November 1943 and set up again in January 1944 as part of the Transcaucasus Front. The staff of the 4th Army was formed from the staff of the 34th Army. The 4th Army was stationed in Iran until August 1945 in accordance with the Soviet-Iranian treaty of 1921.

In February 1944, the 4th Army consisted of:

58th Rifle Corps

68th Mountain Rifle Division
75th Rifle Division
89th Rifle Brigade
90th Rifle Brigade

15th Cavalry Corps

1st Cavalry Division (second formation, ex 1st Mountain Cavalry Division)
23rd Cavalry Division
39th Cavalry Division
1595th AT Regiment
15th Independent AT Battalion
17th Mortar Battalion

28th Anti-Aircraft Battery
492nd Assault Aviation Regiment
167th Fighter Aviation Regiment

=== Commanders During World War II ===
- Aleksandr Korobkov 4th Army (1st formation) (1939 – 8 July 1941)
- Leonid Sandalov 4th Army (1st formation) (8–23 July 1941)
- Vsevolod Yakovlev, 4th Army (2nd formation) (26 September – 9 November 1941)
- Kirill Meretskov, 4th Army (2nd formation) (9 November – 16 December 1941)
- Pyotr Ivanov, 4th Army (2nd formation) (16 December 1941 – 3 February 1942)
- Pyotr Lyapin, 4th Army (2nd formation) (3 February – 25 June 1942)
- Nikolai Gusev, 4th Army (2nd formation) (26 June 1942 – 30 October 1943)
- Ivan Sovetnikov, 4th Army (3rd formation) (1944–1945)

== Postwar service ==
In the years after World War II the Fourth Army was stationed in the Azerbaijan SSR within the Transcaucasus Military District until the fall of the Soviet Union. It was headquartered at Baku, and after it arrived from Iran in 1946 the Baku Military District was abolished. Most of the divisions listed below joined the Army's forces in the Baku region toward the end of the 1940s. From its wartime divisions, toward the end of the 1980s only the 60th Motor Rifle Division 'named for Marshal of the Soviet Union F.I. Tolbukhin' (the former 296th, then 6th Rifle Division) remained. The army was disbanded on 14 August 1992. Most of its equipment went to the armed forces of newly independent Azerbaijan.

=== 1988 Order of Battle ===
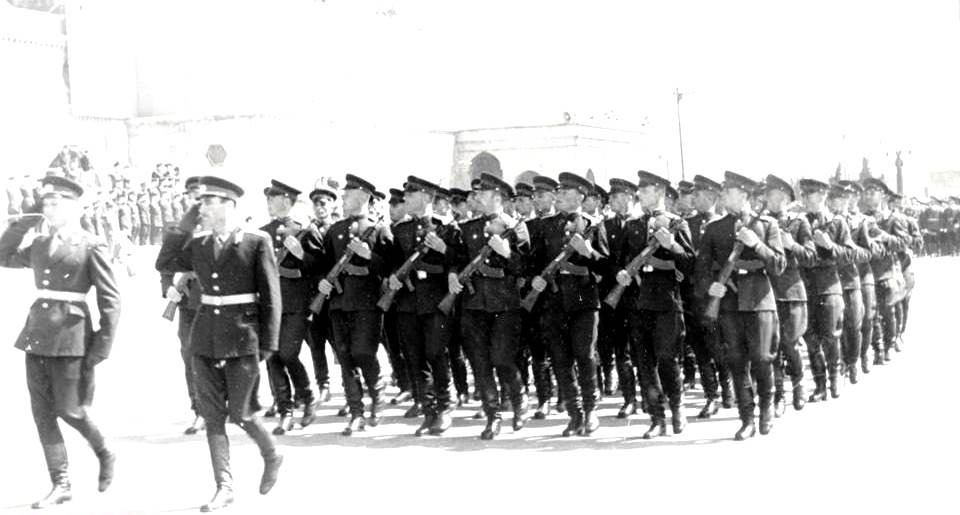
Troops of the 4th Army during a parade in Baku in 1960.

In the late 1980s the 4th Army was composed of:

- 23rd Guards Motor Rifle Division, Kirovabad (Gyandzha (Ganja) from 1989)
- 60th Motor Rifle Division, Lenkoran
- 75th Motor Rifle Division, Nakhichevan, Nakhichevan Autonomous Soviet Socialist Republic (ru:75-я мотострелковая дивизия). Commanded by Colonel (later General-Major) Vasily Shakhnovich (August 1961 – November 1964). In November 1988 Lev Rokhlin became commander of the 75th Motor Rifle Division. In early 1990 the division was transferred to the Soviet Border Troops of the KGB, and Rokhlin was promoted to major-general in February of the same year. Disbanded July 1992.
- 295th Motor Rifle Division, Baku
- Other smaller formations and units:
  - 136th Guards Rocket Brigade (SS-1 Scud), (Perekishkyul, Azerbaijani SSR, 1981–1992)
  - 117th Anti-Aircraft Rocket Brigade, Baku
  - 714th Independent Reconnaissance Battery (отдельный разведывательный артдивизион, a divizion), Baku
  - two artillery units at Qobu:
    - 215th Guards Gun Dniproderzhynsk Red Banner Orders of Suvorov and Kutuzov Artillery Regiment (24 2A36 Giatsint-B, 36 D-20)
    - 941st Reactive Artillery Regiment (36 BM-21 Grad multiple rocket launchers);
  - and two helicopter-equipped aviation units:
    - the 121st Independent Mixed Aviation Squadron (5 Mi-8, 1 Mi-6), Kyzyl-Agach
    - and the 381st Independent Helicopter Squadron (13 Mi-24, 4 Mi-8), Nakhichevan

=== Cold War-era commanders ===
- Colonel General Alexander Luchinsky (25 December 1945 – 19 February 1947)
- Colonel General Ivan Managarov (19 February 1947 – 1 April 1949)
- Colonel General Issa Pliyev (1 April 1949 – 27 June 1955)
- Lieutenant General Sergey Bobruk (27 June 1955 – 12 December 1957)
- Lieutenant General Konstantin Provalov (28 January 1958 – 6 March 1959)
- Lieutenant General Mikhail Lugovtsev (6 March 1959 – 25 February 1961)
- Lieutenant General Antatoly Andrushchenko (25 February 1961 – 4 December 1964)
- Lieutenant General Ivan Tretyak (4 December 1964 – 21 September 1967)
- Lieutenant General Andrey Bolibrukh (22 September 1967 – 19 January 1973)
- Lieutenant General Dmitry Yazov (19 January 1973 – 20 May 1974)
- Lieutenant General Vasily Kirilyuk (20 May 1974 – November 1978)
- Lieutenant General Alexander Kovtunov (December 1978 – June 1981)
- Lieutenant General Viktor Samsonov (May 1985 – May 1987)
- Lieutenant General Anatoly Shapovalov (May 1987 – February 1989)
- Lieutenant General Vladimir Sokolov (February 1989 – December 1991)
- Major General Nikolay Popov (December 1991 – August 1992)

== Sources ==
=== Bibliography ===
- Feskov, V.I.; K.A. Kalashnikov; V.I. Golikov. (2004). The Soviet Army in the Years of the 'Cold War' (1945-1991). Tomsk: Tomsk University Press. ISBN 5-7511-1819-7.
- Feskov, V.I.; Golikov, V.I.; Kalashnikov, K.A.; Slugin, S.A. (2013). Вооруженные силы СССР после Второй Мировой войны: от Красной Армии к Советской [The Armed Forces of the USSR after World War II: From the Red Army to the Soviet: Part 1 Land Forces] (in Russian). Tomsk: Scientific and Technical Literature Publishing. ISBN 9785895035306.
- see also https://samsv.narod.ru/Arm/a04/arm.html
