= Bereznegovatoye–Snigirevka offensive =

March 1944 battle on the Eastern Front of WW2

- Part of Dnieper–Carpathian offensive
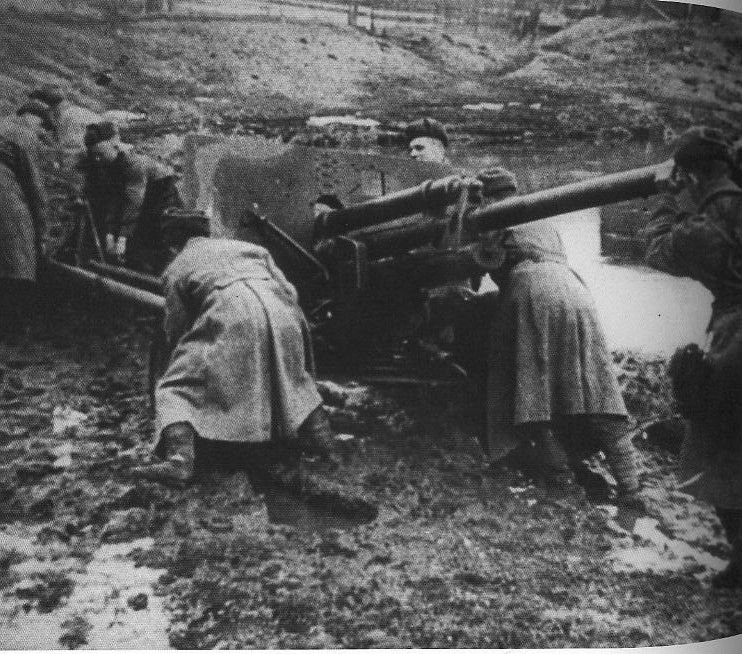
- Soviet artillerymen on the march in rasputitsa, March 1944
Date	Offensive phase: 6–18 March 1944; Consolidation of bridgeheads on the Southern Bug: 19–27 March 1944
Location	Southern Ukraine
Result	Soviet victory

Belligerents
Soviet Union	Germany; Romania

Commanders and leaders
Rodion Malinovsky	Ewald von Kleist (Army Group A); Karl-Adolf Hollidt (6th Army) (Kingdom of Romania) Petre Dumitrescu (3rd Army)

Units involved
3rd Ukrainian Front	Army Group A: 6th Army; (Kingdom of Romania) 3rd Army

Strength
3rd Ukrainian Front on 1 March 1944: 559,650 personnel in total; 8,443 guns and mortars; 573 operational tanks and self-propelled guns; 593 combat aircraft	6th Army on 1 March 1944: Personnel: 286,297 personnel in total Anti-tank guns: 314 operational anti-tank guns (all calibers) in total; 49 anti-tanks guns in repairs Armoured vehicles: 70 operational tanks and assault guns; 33 operational self-propelled tank destroyers (all types); 103 operational armoured vehicles in total; 20 self-propelled tank destroyers (all types) in repairs; unknown number of tanks and assault guns in repairs

Casualties and losses
3rd Ukrainian Front personnel losses in March 1944: 16,749 killed; 1,469 missing; 62,826 wounded; 8,035 sick and other non-combat losses; 89,079 in total	6th Army losses in March 1944: Troops: 3,544 killed; 9,174 missing; 24,000 wounded and sick; 36,718 in total Total irrecoverable equipment losses: 104 tanks and assault guns; 352 artillery pieces (all calibers); 358 mortars; 7,436 motor vehicles (all types); 342 prime movers (all types); 2,275 machine-guns; 2,500 sub-machine guns; 7500 tones of ammunition

The Bereznegovatoye–Snigirevka offensive operation (Russian: Березнеговато-Снигирёвская Наступательная Операция, Bereznegovato-Snigirovskaya Nastupatel'naya Operatsiya), known on the German side as The second winter battle of the 6th Army between the Dnieper, Ingulets and Bug (German: Die zweite Winterschlacht der 6. Armee zwischen Dnjepr, Ingulez und Bug), was an offensive operation conducted in southern Ukraine by the Soviet 3rd Ukrainian Front against the German 6th Army and Romanian 3rd Army of Army Group A, in March 1944. It was part of the second stage of the strategic Dnieper-Carpathian Offensive.

After the collapse of the German Nikopol bridgehead in February 1944, 6th Army was forced to conduct a costly and difficult withdrawal, retreating behind the Ingulets river at the end of the month in conditions of early spring thaw. As a result of the heavy battles of the previous month, all divisions of the 6th Army were heavily depleted by the start of March 1944. The 3rd Ukrainian Front, in pursuit of the retreating 6th Army, crossed the flooded Ingulets river and established numerous bridgeheads on its western bank at the end of February 1944. This would become a staging ground for a new offensive.

== Background ==
After the defeat of the 6th Army during the Nikopol–Krivoi Rog offensive and its retreat behind the Ingulets, the High Command of the Wehrmacht decided to use this overflowing river as a defense line and not allow a further Soviet advance. The German troops conducted a stubborn resistance and repeated counterattacks to hinder Soviet attempts to force a crossing. In several days of fighting, Soviet troops overcame the Ingulets and captured several bridgeheads on the opposite bank.

Directing the front for further operations, Stavka wrote Malinovsky on 28 February, communicating that the most important task of the front was to force a crossing of the Ingulets no later than 2 March in one of the sectors between Shesternya and Bolshaya Aleksandrovkaya and to move the 6th Army and most of the 5th Shock Army across the river with the goal of turning the German defense on the lower course of the Ingulets and collapsing the German troops defending Nikolayev. The left wing of the 5th Shock Army was tasked with advancing between the Ingulets and Dnieper. The 28th Army, with five rifle divisions and Karp Sviridov's 2nd Guards Mechanized Corps, was slated to be used to take Kherson and for operations in the Nikolayev sector. Giving this directive, Stavka believed that the front would have more success in the zone of the 6th and 5th Shock Armies. However, the troops of the front had more significant advances in the zones of the 46th and 8th Guards Armies, where on the night of 3 March they sizable bridgeheads over the Ingulets, to the west of Shirokoye and south of Krivoy Rog.

Based on this success, the commander of the 3rd Ukrainian Front, Army General Rodion Malinovsky, decided to make a breakthrough towards Novyi Buh with Vasily Chuikov's 8th Guards Army from the bridgehead west of Shirokoye and Vasily Glagolev's 46th Army from the bridgehead southwest of Krivoi Rog. Yefim Pushkin's 23rd Tank Corps with 102 tanks and sixteen self-propelled guns was slated for commitment to exploit of the breakthrough in the zone of the 46th Army, while the Cavalry-Mechanized Group of Lieutenant General Issa Pliyev was slated for commitment in the zone of the 8th Guards Army. The group included Trofim Tanaschishin's 4th Guards Mechanized Corps with 100 tanks and 23 self-propelled guns as well as Pliyev's own 4th Guards Cavalry Corps. The group, upon reaching Novy Bug, was tasked with striking to the south into the rear of the German and Romanian troops east of Nikolayev. The armies operating to the right and left of the strike group, were also ordered to shift to the offensive, to divide the German defenses and tie their troops down.

The preparation for the offensive was conducted under extremely difficult rasputitsa conditions. The regrouping of forces, and the transport of ammunition, foodstuffs and fuel was hampered by impassable roads.

== Opposing forces ==
=== Soviet ===
The 3rd Ukrainian Front was significantly strengthened by regrouping carried out in the second half of February. By the beginning of March it included the 5th Shock, 8th Guards, 6th, 28th, 37th, 46th and 57th Combined Arms, 17th Air Army, 23rd Tank, 2nd and 4th Guards Mechanized Corps and the 4th Guards Cavalry Corps. In total, the front fielded 57 rifle and three cavalry divisions, a tank corps, two mechanized corps, and one fortified region. The Soviet troops totaled 500,000 personnel, 9,000 guns and mortars, 372 tanks, and 551 combat aircraft.

=== German ===
As a result of the Nikopol-Krivoy Rog Offensive the previous month, 6th Army had to conduct a costly and difficult withdrawal in conditions of early spring thaw, retreating behind the Ingulets river by the end of February 1944. All divisions of the 6th Army were heavily depleted and exhausted by the end of the month- the army high command rated the combat value of most of their divisions at level 4 (Kampfwert IV), meaning that they were fit for limited defensive operations only.

Summarizing the situation of the 6th Army at the start of March 1944, the army commander, Generaloberst Karl-Adolf Hollidt, reported:

The fierce defensive battles of the last few weeks have been the toughest test of the army's endurance. The mentally and physically overstrained troops had to give their last. Only through draconian performance demands could the set operational goals be achieved. Due to heavy personnel and material losses, the majority of army divisions are now physically, numerically and materially worn-out. The combat value and mobility of the divisions has declined even further as a result of the recent fighting.
In addition to the exhausted state of the troops, the state of the horses and the performance of the remaining motor vehicles is extremely strained due to the hard demands of the battles and the catastrophic road conditions.
The health condition of the troops, which had fallen sharply as a result of the change in the weather, deteriorated even further, since the troops had to fight and march without interruption and under unfavorable operational conditions. Particularly noteworthy are the numerous cases of frostbite, total infestation with lice, intestinal diseases and general physical exhaustion.
In addition to the existing large shortage of officers, there were further heavy combat losses. Due to the drop in the number and quality of experienced officers and non-commissioned officers, the inner structure of the troops in the worn-out divisions will no longer be able to cope with heavier loads.
[...]
The bulk of the army's divisions lost a large part of their weaponry and equipment in recent battles as a result of breakthrough battles with reversed fronts and through rough terrain. The considerable shortage of infantry weapons, motor vehicles, especially prime movers, anti-tank guns and equipment of all kinds results in extraordinary difficulties in combat management, supply and subsequent training needs.
[...]
The level of training sank further due to high losses of officers, NCOs and old enlisted men. The battles and withdrawal movements, with their constant strain on all forces, took away any possibility of training.
[...]
The mood and attitude of the troops were depressed by the heavy mental and physical strain and the extraordinary combat conditions.

On the day of the Soviet offensive, 6th Army had the following order of battle.

6th Army order of battle. Status: 6 March 1944
Corps	Divisions under subordination
XXXXIV Army Corps	79th Infantry Division, 304th Infantry Division, 335th Infantry Division
XVII Army Corps	Kampfgruppe 9th Infantry Division, Kampfgruppe 17th Infantry Division, Kampfgruppe 306th Infantry Division,
IV Army Corps	258th Infantry Division+ Kampfgruppe 387th Infantry Division, 294th Infantry Division, 302nd Infantry Division+ Kampfgruppe 125th Infantry Division, Kampfgruppe 9th Panzer Division
XXIX Army Corps	97th Jäger Division, 3rd Mountain Division, 24th Panzer Division, Kampfgruppe 16th Panzergrenadier Division
LVII Panzer Corps	15th Infantry Division, Kampfgruppe 23rd Panzer Division, Kampfgruppe 46th Infantry Division, Corps-Detachment Tronnier (soon renamed to Corps-Detachment F), 257th Infantry Division, Kampfgruppe 3rd Panzer Division
LII Army Corps	76th Infantry Division, 384th Infantry Division, Corps-Detachment A

== Offensive ==
Soviet offensive preparations were largely complete by the end of 5 March, and at dawn on 6 March the troops of the front's main group launched the attack, preceded by a strong artillery barrage and air attacks on the German positions. The same day the other armies of the front began advancing in their sectors. Thus, the defending forces of the 6th Army were subjected to attack along an extensive front. The attack of the 3rd Ukrainian Front took place at the same time as the offensives of the 1st and 2nd Ukrainian Fronts to the north.

The 8th Guards Army took the first German defensive positions, but German opposition continued, relying on the flooded river and fortified settlements. By the evening of 6 March the battle continued with the previous intensity, but the advance of the infantry slowed slightly. To strengthen the attack, Malinovsky committed the Cavalry-Mechanized Group. Under pouring rain, along soaked roads, the Cavalry-Mechanized Group approached the front. Late in the evening of 6 March the group reached the frontline and in conjunction with the infantry pushed the German defenders from their lines.

Exploiting the breakthrough, the Cavalry-Mechanized Group penetrated deep into the German defenses, cut the line of communications, and struck the German supply depots, quickly advancing towards Novy Bug. On the morning of 8 March reconnaissance reported that at the Novy Bug station German troops were unloading trains with tanks, ammunition, and uniforms. It was decide to attack the station right away. Reaching the station, the Soviet tanks opened fire against the German trains, and cavalry of Ivan Tutarinov's 9th Guards Cavalry Division and Vasily Golovskoy's 30th Cavalry Division from the east and south entered the station and panicked the German defenders. After fifteen minutes, the station was cleared of German troops, cutting the Dolynska-Nikolayev rail line, and Soviet units moved on the city of Novy Bug, having split the front of the German 6th Army in half, creating conditions for a deep envelopment of the German right flank.

Novy Bug was the headquarters of the German 6th Army, and contained depots with provisions, fuel, ammunition and uniforms. The city was fortified, surrounded by two unbroken lines of trenches. The Soviet attack took the German defenders by surprise and they were unable to offer resistance. The 9th Guards Cavalry Division pursued the retreating German troops from the east, the 4th Guards Mechanized Corps from the northeast, and the 30th Cavalry Division from the south and southwest, reaching the outskirts of Novy Bug. The German defenders used houses as concealment, and were cleared by 8:00 on the morning of 8 March. The German troops abandoned equipment and tanks in the retreat. After the capture of Novy Bug the Cavalry-Mechanized Group was ordered to strike to the south, into the German rear, operating in advance of the left wing of the front. Liberating Bashtanka after fierce fighting, by 12–13 March they cut the German retreat route to the west and reached the Ingulets south of Snigerevka.

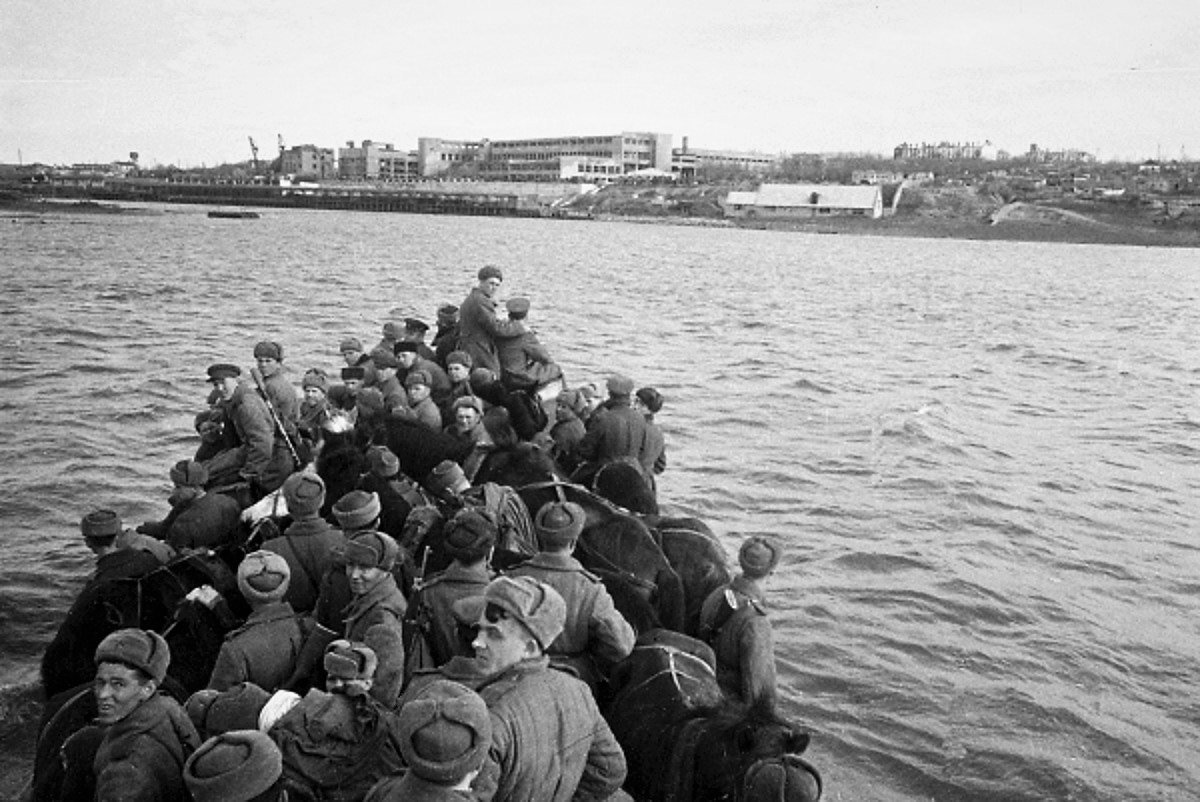
Soviet soldiers ferried across the Dniepr to Kherson

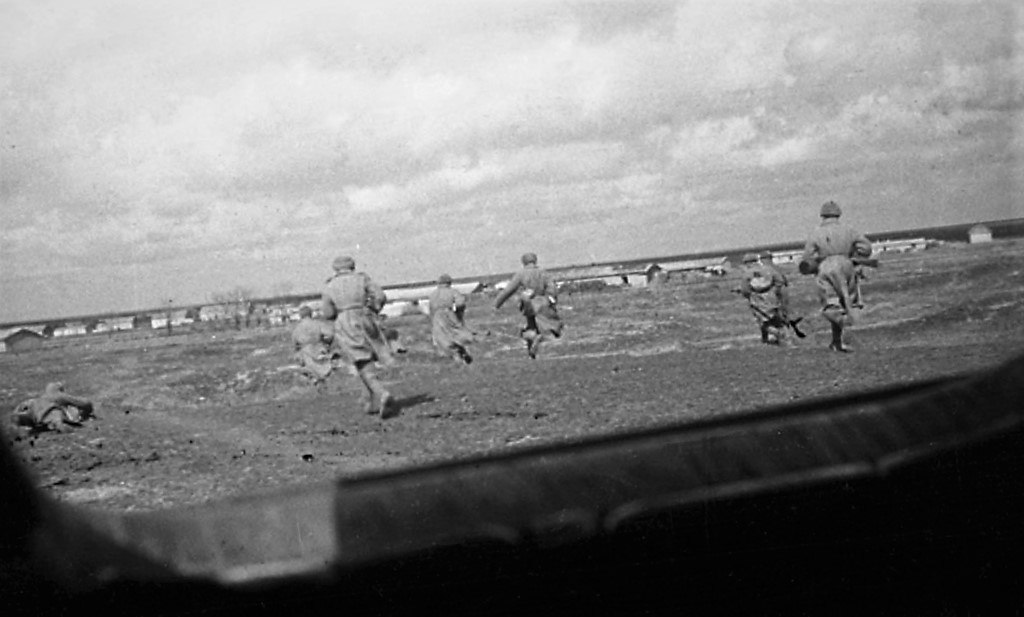
Troops of the 3rd Ukrainian Front fighting for Kherson

Troops of the Soviet 6th Army (Lieutenant-General Ivan Shlemin), the 5th Shock Army (General Vyacheslav Tsvetayev) and the 28th Army (Lieutenant-General Aleksei Grechkin), deployed on the southern wing, simultaneously carried out attacks from the east and south against the right wing (LXXII and XXXXIV Army Corps) of the 6th Army. Sustained fighting developed for Berislav, located on the steep banks of the Dnieper. On 11 March the 4th and 5th Guards Motor Rifle Brigades of the 2nd Guards Mechanized Corps cleared the city. Between 11 and 12 March Vasily Margelov's 49th Guards Rifle Division and Aleksandr Dorofeyev's 295th Rifle Division from the 28th Army forced a crossing of the Dnieper in the Kakhovka area, capturing bridgeheads on the right bank. Developing the offensive along the northern bank of the Dnieper, the 28th Army forced a crossing of the Ingulets in its lower course and soon entered battle for Kherson. Despite the stubborn German resistance, the 49th Guards and 295th Rifle Divisions liberated the important port city on 13 March, establishing complete Soviet control of the right bank.

As a result of the Soviet attacks from the east, north, west and south ten German divisions (XVII., XXXXIV., LII. And IV. Army Corps) on the left wing of the front in the area of Bereznegovatoye and Snigirevka were threatened with complete encirclement and destruction. Hollidt ordered the encircled troops to break out to the west in small groups and even alone if necessary on 13 March. At the same time the German troops prepared defenses on the Southern Bug and in the Nikolayev area, with the 5th Luftwaffe Field Division and 1031st Motorized Regiment on the line outside of Nikolayev. The troops encircled in the area of Bereznegovatoye and Singirevka were destroyed, but significant units, benefiting from gaps in the line of the Cavalry-Mechanized Group, managed to break through to Nikolayev and beyond the Southern Bug, abandoning almost all artillery, heavy equipment and transport. The mass of the 8th Guards Army was still fighting in the Bashtanka and Vladimirovka area against the German XXIX. Army Corps. The 37th Rifle Corps (Maj. Gen. Sergei Gorokhov) of the 5th Shock Army, advancing from the east on Snigirevka, was still too far to help in the encirclement. The 370th, 304th, 335th and 9th Infantry Divisions suffered particularly heavy losses. On 15 March, Bereznegovatoye and Snigirevka were liberated by Soviet troops. The German troops withdrew behind the Southern Bug River, where they attempted to stop the Soviet advance.

Pursuing the retreating German troops, the forces of the center and left wing of the front reached the Southern Bug and the approaches to Nikolayev between 16 and 20 March. The 394th Rifle Division of the 46th Army reached the Southern Bug in the Troitskoye area on 16 March, and in two days of fighting the division forced the German rearguard to retreat across the river. The division forced a crossing of the river and seized a bridgehead on the night of 18–19 March. To the left, the 8th Guards Army reached the western bank of the river south of Nova Odesa and prepared the attack on Odessa. The 57th and 37th Armies, on the right wing of the front, broke through the German defenses and liberated the rail junction of Dolinskaya and road junction of Bobrynets, and then the 37th Army reached the Southern Bug and after two days of sustained fighting on 24 March liberated Voznesensk. In the fighting near Voznesensk the German 257th Infantry Division suffered heavy losses.

== Result ==
Within 13 days, the 3rd Ukrainian Front had managed to decisively beat the 6th Army. A very large Soviet territory (more than 20,000 km^{2}), between the Inhulets and Southern Bug Rivers was liberated. The 125th Infantry Division was completely destroyed and dissolved by the High Command of the Wehrmacht. The 16th Panzer Grenadier Division lost two thirds of its strength, the 9th Panzer Division, the 15th, the 294th, the 302nd, the 304th and the 335th Infantry Divisions lost 50% of their strength and almost all their heavy material. 13,700 German soldiers and officers were captured. Colonel-General Hollidt was replaced as Commander-in-Chief of the 6th Army at the end of March 1944. For the Soviet Union, favorable conditions had been created for a direct attack on the German troops around Odessa and Nikolayev. The 3rd Ukrainian Front launched the Odessa Offensive on 26 March.

== Sources ==
- This is a translation of the article in the German Wikipedia, Beresnegowatoje-Snigirjower Operation.
- Map of the Operation

=== Bibliography ===
- Erickson, John (1999) [1983]. Stalin's War with Germany: The road to Berlin. New Haven: Yale University Press. ISBN 9780300078138.
- Frieser, Karl-Heinz, ed. (2017) [2007]. Germany and the Second World War. Vol. VIII: The Eastern Front, 1943–1944: The War in the East and on the Neighbouring Fronts. Oxford: Oxford University Press. ISBN 9780198723462.
- Glantz, David (1989). Soviet Military Deception in the Second World War. London: Frank Cass. ISBN 0-7146-3347-X.
- Grylev, A. N. (1970). Днепр-Карпаты-Крым. Освобождение Правобережной Украины и Крыма в 1944 году [Dnieper, Carpathians, Crimea: The Liberation of Right-bank Ukraine and Crimea in 1944] (in Russian). Moscow: Nauka. OCLC 2791694.
- Ziemke, Earl F. (2002) [1966]. Stalingrad to Berlin: The German Defeat in the East. Washington, D.C.: United States Army Center of Military History. OCLC 1013364845. Archived from the original on January 11, 2012.
