= 30th Cavalry Division =

Cavalry division of the Soviet Union

30th Cavalry Division 11th Mechanised Division
- Active: unknown - 1938, June 1941 - 1947
- Country: Soviet Union
- Branch: Cavalry
- Size: Division
- Engagements: Second World War
- Battle honours: "Baranovichi", "Slonim" and "Brest"

The 30th Cavalry Division was a unit of the Soviet Red Army. The unit was disbanded in 1938 but reformed shortly after the June 1941 invasion of the USSR by Nazi Germany. It served on the Southern Front and helped push back Axis forces during the Battle of Rostov. In August 1943 the 30th Cavalry Division was commended by Joseph Stalin for their actions in the liberation of Taganrog and it later operated near Odessa. In the second half of 1944 the division was deployed in the Soviet centre, in modern-day Belarus. The unit received the honorifics "Baranovichi", "Slonim" and "Brest" but was almost destroyed at Nyíregyháza by a German counterattack during the Battle of Debrecen. After the war, the division was briefly converted into the 11th Mechanised Division, disbanded in 1947.

== Pre-war ==
The 30th Cavalry Division was commanded by General Vladimir Romanovich Vashkevich from 1935 to 1937. It was disbanded in 1938.

== Second World War ==
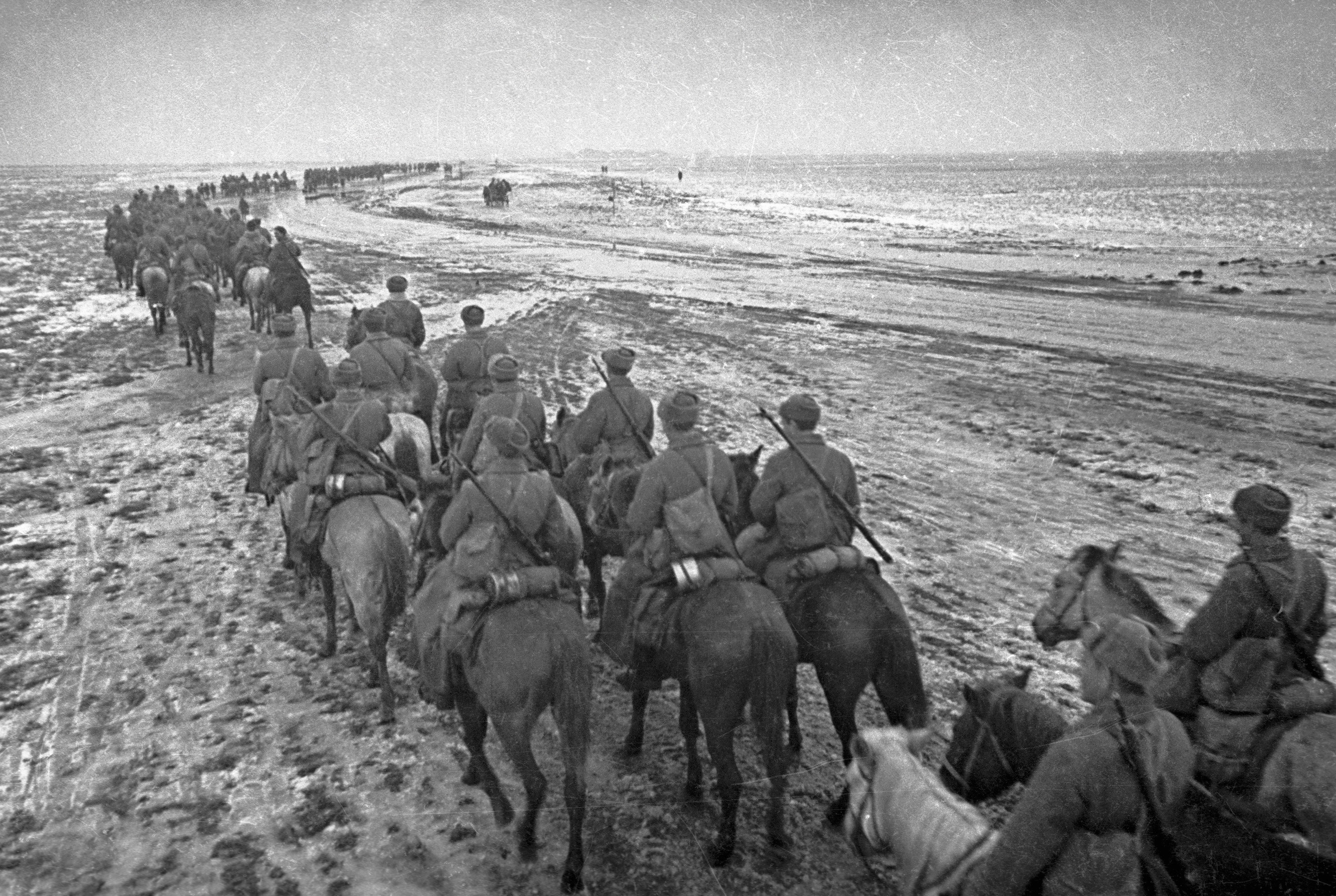
Part of the 4th Guards Cavalry Corps near Odessa, 1944

Following the June 1941 invasion of the USSR by Nazi Germany the 30th Cavalry Division was reformed in Odessa Military District on 10 July. It was formed of the 127th, 133rd and 138th Cavalry Regiments and was commanded by Major General Nikolay Andreyevich Pichugin. The 30th Cavalry Division was assigned initially to the 18th Army before being transferred to the 12th Army on the Southern Front. The 30th Cavalry Division was deployed alongside the 96th Mountain Rifle Division south of Novokyivka, facing the Hungarian portion of the Axis advance.

By late November 1941 the 30th Cavalry Division was fighting in the Battle of Rostov. A Soviet attack forced German forces back from Rostov towards their bridgehead at Taganrog. The 30th Cavalry Division was successful in penetrating the German rear and harassing them during the retreat to the Mius-Front.

In December 1941 the 30th Cavalry Division was assigned to the 6th Cavalry Corps and on 18 January 1942 transferred to the 5th Cavalry Corps. In February it was assigned to the 9th Army, returning to the 5th Cavalry Corps within 12th Army in May and back to the 9th Army in July. In August it became part of the 4th Guards Cavalry Corps, along with the 9th and 10th Guards Cavalry Divisions During 1942 Major General Vasily Sergeyevich Golovskoi assumed command of the 30th Cavalry Division.

The 30th Cavalry Division was reinforced in 1943 with a draft of men forcibly conscripted from the Checheno-Ingush Autonomous Soviet Socialist Republic, though the region met scarcely half of its 3,000-man recruitment target. In January 1943 the division was augmented with a mortar-artillery regiment and in June 1943 was assigned the 151st Tank Regiment. In August 1943 the division, which was then commanded by Major General Ivan Tutarinov, was one of a number commended by Joseph Stalin for their actions in the liberation of Taganrog.

The unit remained with the 4th Guards Cavalry Corps (commanded by Lieutenant General Issa Pliyev) into 1944. In early 1944 during the Dnieper–Carpathian offensive the 30th Cavalry Division, under Major General Vasily Sergeevich Golovskoi, fell upon German divisions withdrawing from Odessa, forcing their surrender. The division was moved further north and west later that year. In July 1944 it raced to seize Stowbtsy (modern Belarus) ahead of advancing German forces from the 28th Jäger Division (Wehrmacht). That same month it received the honorifics "Baranovichi" and "Slonim", receiving one for "Brest" in August.

The 30th Cavalry Division was part of the Soviet forces committed at Nyíregyháza in the Autumn 1944 Battle of Debrecen. The unit was effectively wiped out by a counterattack by the 23rd Panzer Division on 24 October which recaptured the town. It had by this point been equipped with vehicles of American origin through the Lend-Lease scheme.

The division survived and in 1945 was commanded by Major General Grigoriy Ivanocvich Reva. The 30th Cavalry Division was one of the few pre-war regular divisions of the Red Army that was not redesignated as guards during the war. By summer 1945, the 30th Cavalry Division was transformed into the 11th Mechanised Division and garrisoned in Sambir, Carpathian Military District. In 1946, the division moved to Pukhavichy, Byelorussian Military District. It was disbanded on 23 March 1947.

== Sources ==
- Feskov, V.I.; Golikov, V.I.; Kalashnikov, K.A.; Slugin, S. A. (2013). Вооруженные силы СССР после Второй Мировой войны: от Красной Армии к Советской [The Armed Forces of the USSR after World War II: From the Red Army to the Soviet: Part 1 Land Forces] (in Russian). Tomsk: Scientific and Technical Literature Publishing. ISBN 9785895035306.
