= Vasily Margelov =

Soviet general (1908–1990)

Vasily Filippovich Margelov
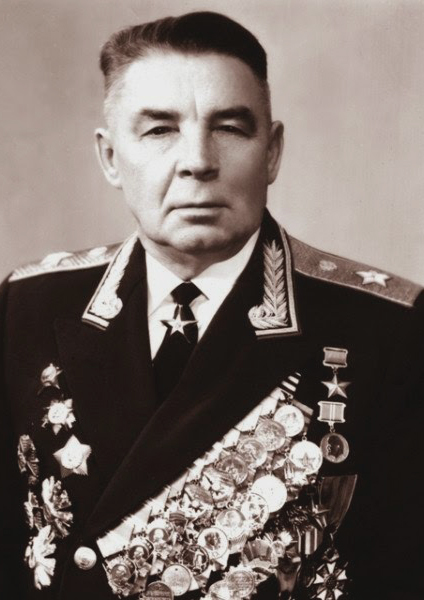
- Native name: Василий Филиппович Маргелов
- Born: 27 December (O.S. 14 December) 1908; Ekaterinoslav, Yekaterinoslav Governorate, Russian Empire (today Dnipro, Ukraine)
- Died: 4 March 1990 Moscow, RSFSR, Soviet Union
- Buried: Novodevichy Cemetery
- Allegiance: Soviet Union
- Branch: Soviet Army; Soviet Airborne Forces
- Service years: 1928–1990 (62 years)
- Rank: General of the Army
- Commands: 49th Guards Rifle Division; 76th Guards Air Assault Division; 37th Guards Airborne Corps; Soviet Airborne Forces
- Conflicts: World War II; Invasion of Poland; Winter War; Eastern Front; Battle of Leningrad; Battle of Stalingrad; Donbass Strategic Offensive
- Awards: Hero of the Soviet Union; Order of Lenin (4); Order of the October Revolution; Order of the Red Banner (2); Order of Suvorov, 2nd class; Order of the Patriotic War, 1st class (2); Order of the Red Star; Legion of Merit; Bronze Star
- Spouses: Marya (divorced); Theodosia Selitskaya (divorced); Anna Kurakina
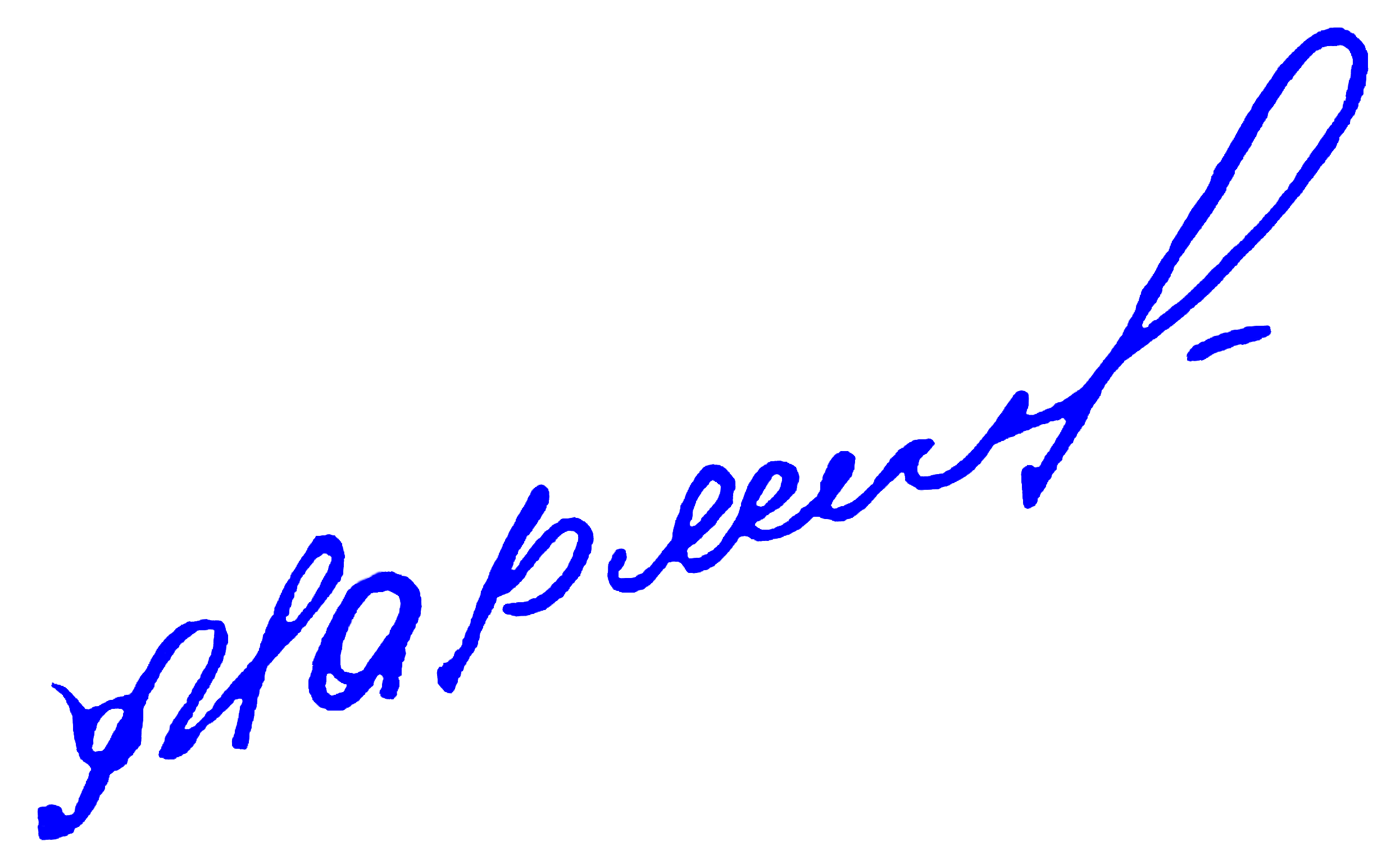
- Signature

Vasily Filippovich Margelov (Russian: Васи́лий Фили́ппович Марге́лов; Belarusian: Васі́ль Пілі́павіч Марге́лаў; 27 December [O.S. 14 December] 1908 – 4 March 1990) was a Red Army General who commanded the Soviet Airborne Forces (VDV) from 1954 to 1959 and from 1961 to 1979. During his total of 23 years commanding the Soviet Airborne Forces, Margelov reformed and modernized the VDV. He was named a Hero of the Soviet Union in March 1944.

After serving over 60 years in the Soviet military, Margelov retired early in 1990, dying on 4 March in the same year. Author Carey Schofield assessed that Margelov "...is considered to be the real father of the VDV...[leading]...them through their most vital period of development."

== Early life ==
Vasily Markelov (later changed to Margelov due to a spelling error) was born on 27 December 1906 in the city of Ekaterinoslav, the son of Belarusian parents Filipp Ivanovich Markelov and Agata Stepanovna. (Note: Most post-World War II sources list Margelov's birthdate as 1908, however, prewar records and Margelov's 1939 autobiography state that he was born in 1906.) His father, Filipp Markelov, worked in an iron foundry. (Note: Margelov's father was drafted into the Russian Imperial Army during World War I and fought in combat, receiving the Cross of St. George in the third and fourth classes. He sided with the Bolsheviks during the Russian Civil War, returning to Kastsyukovichy in 1920. The elder Margelov aided partisans during World War II and was burned to death in his own home after being discovered by German authorities.) In 1913, the Markelov family returned to Belarus and settled in Kastsyukovichy, the hometown of Margelov's father, where he graduated from the local parochial school in the mid-1910s. As a teenager, he worked as a loader and a carpenter. In the same year, he became an apprentice in a tanning shop and soon became an assistant master. In 1923, Margelov became a laborer in a local bakery. There is some evidence that Margelov graduated from the School of Rural Youth and worked as a forwarder in local mail delivery.

From 1924, Margelov worked in the Kalinin mine at Ekaterinoslav. In 1925, he returned to Belarus and worked as a forester in the timber industry in Kostiukovichi. In 1927, he became the chairman of the working committee of the timber industry and was elected to the local council.

== Interwar military service ==
In 1928, Margelov was drafted into the Red Army. He studied at the United Belarusian Military School from 1928 to 1931. He was appointed the commander of a machine gun platoon in the 99th Rifle Regiment of the 33rd Rifle Division in Mogilev. In December 1932, he became a cadet in the 3rd Orenburg Pilot and observer school, but was expelled in January 1933 for making "politically ignorant statements". Margelov became the commander of a machine gun platoon in the United Belarusian Military School. In February 1934, he became the deputy commander of the company and its commander in May 1936.

From 25 October 1938, Margelov commanded the 2nd Battalion of the 23rd Rifle Regiment of the 8th Rifle Division. As chief of intelligence of the division, he participated in the Soviet invasion of Poland.

== World War II ==
During the Winter War, Margelov commanded a separate ski reconnaissance battalion in the 596th Rifle Regiment of the 122nd Rifle Division. During one raid on the Finnish rear area, he reportedly captured a group of Swedish volunteers. During the war, Margelov was wounded. After the end of the Winter War, Margelov was appointed assistant commander of the 596th Rifle Regiment. In October 1940, he became the commander of the 15th Separate Disciplinary Battalion of the Leningrad Military District.

After Operation Barbarossa, Margelov became the commander of the 3rd Guards Rifle Regiment of the 1st Guards Division of Leningrad Front militia (ru:1-я гвардейская стрелковая дивизия народного ополчения (Володарского района)) in July 1941. In November, he was appointed commander of the 1st Special (in the sense of "irregular") Ski Regiment, composed of Baltic Fleet sailors. On 21 November, Margelov was wounded in a raid behind enemy lines on Lake Ladoga. After the end of his convalescence, he became the commander of the 218th Rifle Regiment of the 80th Rifle Division during the Siege of Leningrad. From 15 July 1942, Margelov was the commander of the newly reformed 13th Guards Rifle Regiment of the 3rd Guards Rifle Division. In October 1942, the division was sent to the Southern Front. In December, the regiment repulsed German attempts at relieving the encircled 6th Army during the Battle of Stalingrad.

In January 1943, Margelov became the 3rd Guards Rifle Division's deputy commander. He participated in the Salsk-Rostov Offensive during the same month. Margelov also fought in the Donbass Strategic Offensive and in the Melitopol Offensive from August to November 1943.

In 1944, Margelov became the commander of the 49th Guards Rifle Division. During the Bereznegovatoye–Snigirevka Offensive, the division crossed the Dnieper on the night of 12 March. On the next night, the rapidly advancing division crossed the Inhulets River and captured Kherson within a few hours. The division was awarded the title "Kherson" and Margelov became a Hero of the Soviet Union on 19 March. Margelov led the division through the Second Jassy–Kishinev Offensive, Belgrade Offensive, Budapest Offensive, Vienna Offensive and the Prague Offensive. During fighting outside Budapest, the division repulsed German counterattacks on the night of 13–14 February 1945. For its actions the division was awarded the Order of Suvorov 2nd class. In the Moscow Victory Parade of 1945, he commanded a battalion on the regiment representing the 2nd Ukrainian Front.

== Postwar ==
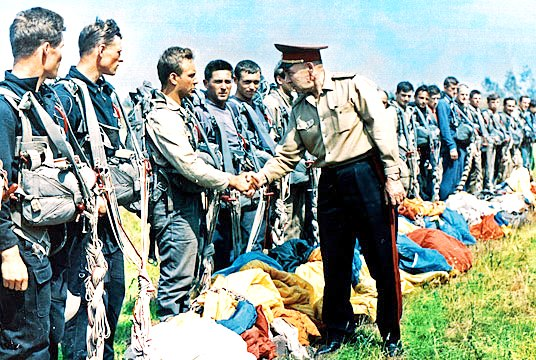
Margelov speaking to paratroopers

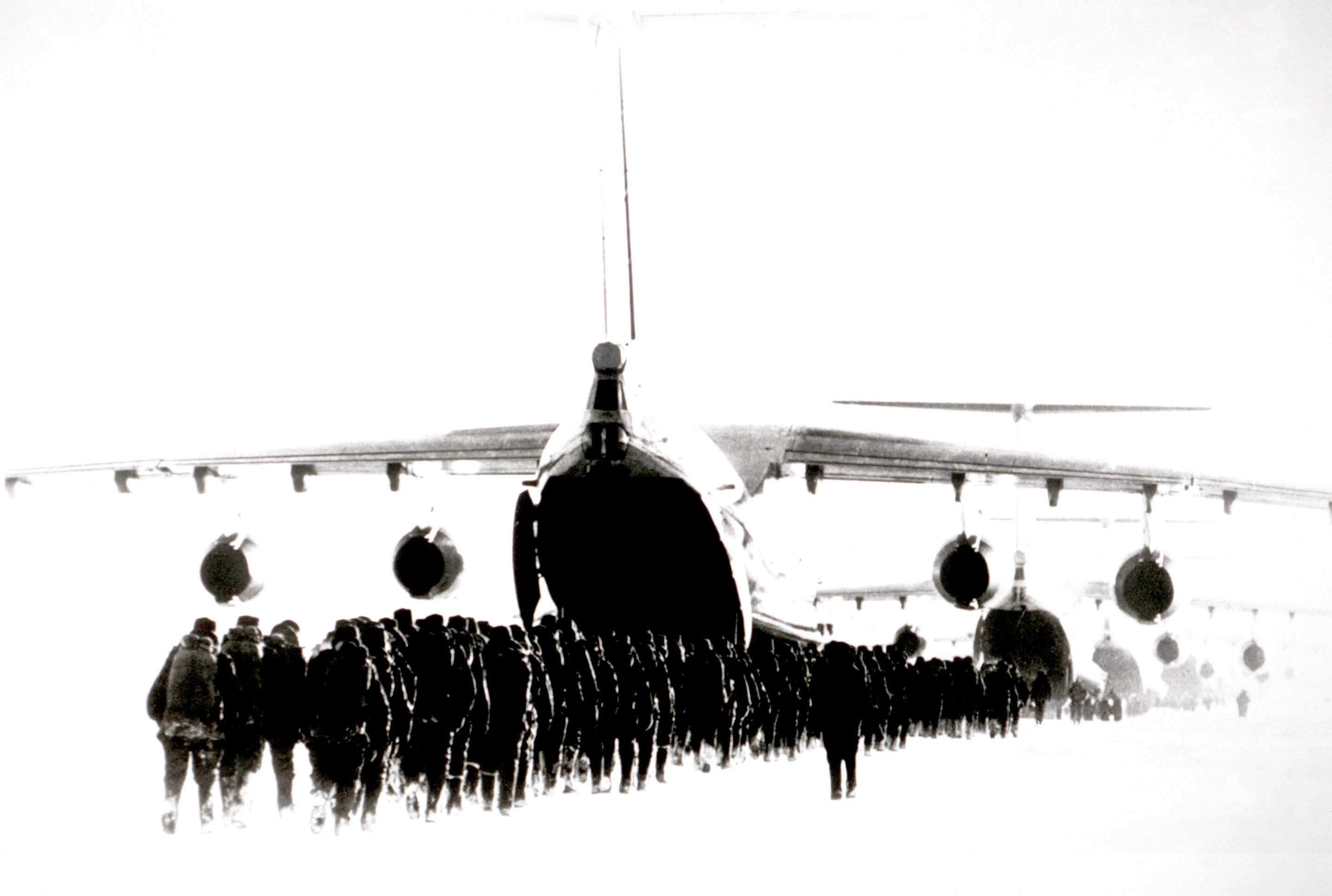
An Il-76 transport loading paratroops in 1984

In 1948, Margelov graduated from the Voroshilov Military Academy of the USSR Army General Staff and became the commander of the 76th Guards Airborne Division in April in Pskov. Between 1950 and 1954, he was the commander of the 37th Guards Airborne Corps. In May 1954, he became commander of the Soviet airborne. After an incident in the airborne forces, which Schofield describes as encouraging a sergeant to wrestle a bear during a birthday party, Margelov was demoted to deputy commander in 1959. In July 1961, he became the airborne forces commander again. He initiated the mass production of parachute systems and helped to introduce the An-22 and Il-76 into service. During his tenure in command of the VDV, the PP-127 parachute was developed, which allowed BMD-1 infantry fighting vehicles to be airdropped. In May 1967 Colonel-General Margelov played a crucial part in Operation "Rhodopes-67", a massive deployment of Warsaw Pact airborne forces in the People's Republic of Bulgaria near the Greek border as a show of force to deter the recently established military regime of the Greek junta.

The main force in the operation was the Soviet contingent, made up of the complete 106th Airborne Landing Division of the VDV, which carried out an airborne landing en-masse in the mountainous region of the Rhodope Mountains (hence the name) and the 309th Separate Marine Infantry Battalion of the Black Sea Fleet, which carried out an amphibious landing in Varna and immediately deployed over 300 km overland to join up with the 106th. The overall commander of the operation was the Bulgarian Minister of People's Defence Army General Dobri Dzhurov, but Col-Gen. Margelov was the person actually in charge. The operation was a success and later that year on 28 October 1967 Margelov was promoted to general of the army. He organized the Soviet airborne operations during the Warsaw Pact invasion of Czechoslovakia. From January 1979, he was in the Group of Inspectors General of the Ministry of Defence. Margelov was the chairman of the State Examination Commission of the Ryazan Airborne School. Margelov lived in Moscow and died on 4 March 1990 at the age of 81. He is buried in the Novodevichy Cemetery.

== Family ==
Among his children was Vitaly Margelov, a politician and intelligence officer. Vitaly's son, and Vasily's grandson, is the politician Mikhail Margelov.

Another of his sons, Aleksandr Margelov, was also a VDV officer. His father Vasily Filippovich was a strong advocate for the mechanization of the VDV with drop-capable IFVs and APCs and this necessitated the development of heavy duty airborne drop systems for them. Due to his university degree in engineering before joining the VDV Aleksandr Vasilyevich was appointed senior engineer at the VDV's Scientific Technical Committee (старший инженер Научно-технического комитета ВДВ) and took it upon himself to prove these systems safe. On 5 January 1973, near Tula at the 106th Airborne Landing Division's "Slobodka" training grounds he was the first to drop from an Antonov An-12B "Cub" cargo airplane inside a BMD-1 in order to test the Kentavr multiple parachute system. The crew commander of the BMD-1 was Lt-Col. Leonid Zuev and 1st Lt. Aleksandr Margelov was the gunner. The test was a resounding success (which earned him a field promotion to Captain on the spot), but the large area of parachutes and ropes all around the BMD right after touch-down made the machine immobile until the crew came out and detached the 'Kentavr' system, most probably under fire in wartime, which to a great degree made the system pointless, so other solutions had to be developed. This came in the form of the 'Reaktavr' system, which greatly reduced the number of parachutes used. Their role with the 'Reaktavr' was to reduce the speed and most importantly to stabilise the vehicle in a perfect horizontal position for three retarding rocket boosters placed over the BMP to fire close to the ground and land the machine as gently as possible. On 23 January 1976 at the 76th Airborne Landing Division's Kislovo training grounds near Pskov now Major Aleksandr Margelov was once again the first one to test the new system and this time as the crew commander, with Lt.-Col. Leonid Shcherbakov acting as his gunner. On both occasions Aleksandr was nominated for the state honor Hero of the Soviet Union award, but did not receive the medal, likely not to raise criticism of nepotism due to the position of his father. He has received the belated honor after the collapse of the USSR on 29 August 1996, in the form of Hero of the Russian Federation by Presidential Order #1282 with the resolution "For fortitude and heroism, demonstrated in the testing, perfection and mass implementation in the troops of special machinery" (за мужество и героизм, проявленные при испытании, доводке и освоении специальной техники).

== Legacy ==
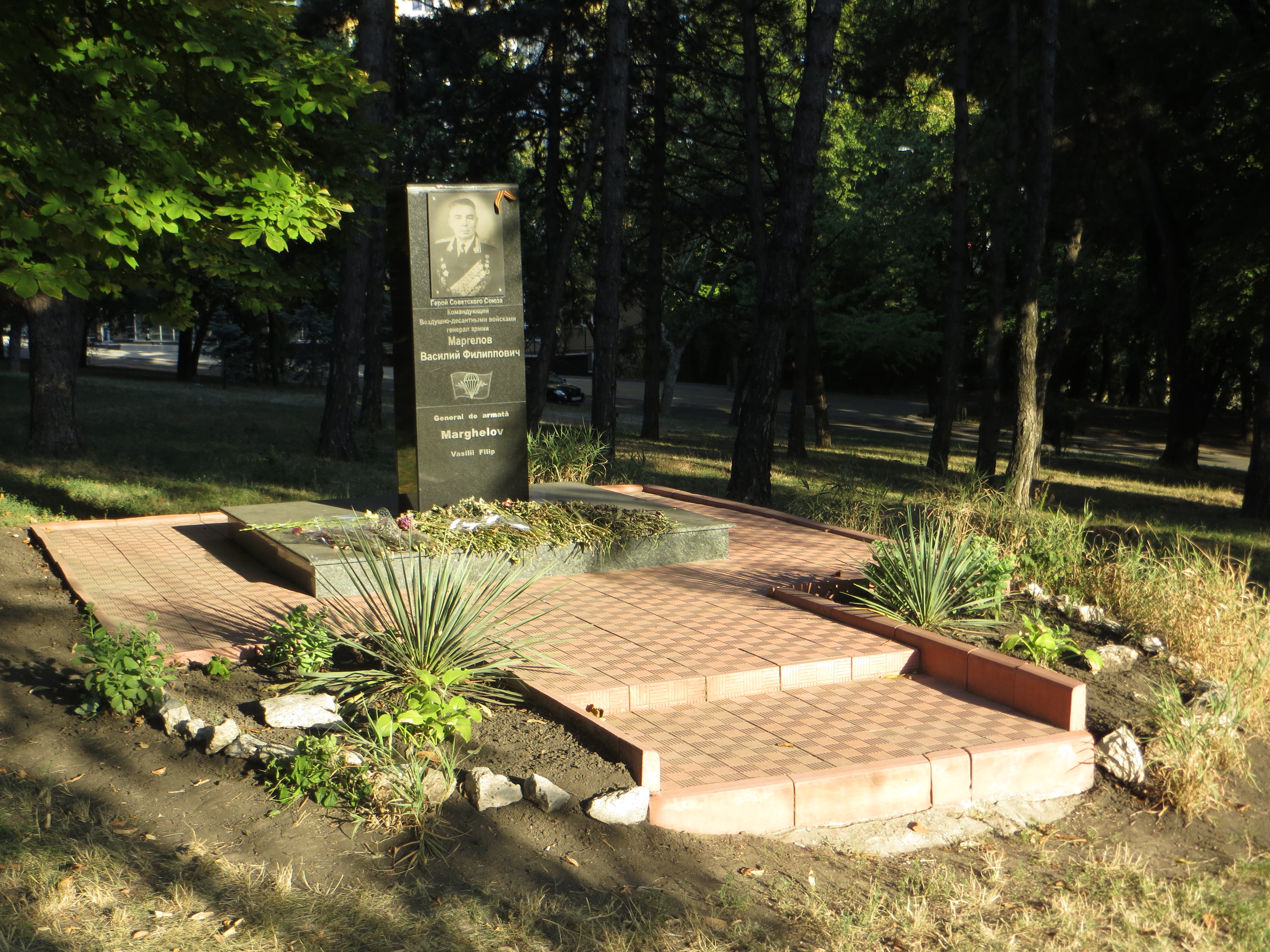
Monument in Chișinău

=== Memorials ===
There are memorials to Margelov in Kryvyi Rih, Omsk, Tula, Tyumen, St. Petersburg, Ulyanovsk and Ivanovo.

On 21 February 2010, a bust of Margelov was installed near the Palace of Youth in Kherson. A monument to Margelov was erected on 5 June 2010 in Chișinău. On 4 November 2013, a memorial to Margelov opened in Nizhny Novgorod's Victory Park. There is a monument to Margelov at the headquarters of the 95th Airmobile Brigade in Zhytomyr. On 7 May 2014, a monument to Margelov was opened in Nazran's local memorial complex. On 8 June, a bust of Margelov was included in Simferopol's new Walk of Fame. On 8 October, a memorial complex was dedicated to Margelov in Bender, near the City House of Culture. On 27 December, a memorial bust of Margelov was installed in Saratov's Walk of Fame at School No. 43. There is also a monument of Margelov in Dubasari, a city of the breakaway Pridnestrovian Moldavian Republic (Transnistria).

A bust of Margelov was erected on 23 April 2015 in Slavyansk-na-Kubani. On 25 April, a bust of Margelov was placed in Taganrog's city center. On 12 June, a monument to Margelov was installed in Yaroslavl at the headquarters of the regional military-patriotic organization. On 18 July, a bust of Margelov was erected in Donetsk. On 1 August, another monument to Margelov was erected in Yaroslavl. On 12 September, a monument was installed in Krasnoperekopsk.

The Ryazan Higher Airborne Command School is named after Margelov. There is also a street in Moscow named for him.

On 6 May 2005, the Russian Federation Ministry of Defence established the departmental Medal "Army General Margelov", awarded to soldiers of the VDV.

During the Russian occupation of Kherson Oblast during the Russian invasion of Ukraine, Margelov has become a rallying figure for pro-Russian collaborators, who raised a volunteer unit baring his name in october 2022 to fight alongside the Russian army.

A monument to Margelov was installed in Dnipro (his place of birth) in the year 2000. Mayor of Dnipro Borys Filatov claimed on Friday 13 January 2023 that this monument would soon be removed from the public space of the city. The monument was dismantled on 15 August 2026. It was reported that in its place a monument to Ukrainian paratroopers would be placed.

== Honours and awards ==
=== Soviet orders and medals ===
- Hero of the Soviet Union (19 March 1944)
- Order of Lenin, four times (21 March 1944, 3 November 1953, 26 December 1968, 26 December 1978)
- Order of the October Revolution (5 April 1972)
- Order of the Red Banner, twice (2 March 1943, 20 June 1949)
- Order of Suvorov, 2nd class (28 April 1944)
- Order of the Patriotic War, 1st class, twice (25 January 1943, 20 June 1949)
- Order of the Red Star (11 March 1944)
- Order for Service to the Homeland in the Armed Forces of the USSR, 2nd class (14 December 1988) and 3rd class (30 April 1975)
- campaign and jubilee medals

=== Foreign awards ===
- Order of the People's Republic of Bulgaria, 2nd class (20 September 1969)
- Medal "90th Anniversary of the birth of Georgy Dimitrov" (22 February 1974)
- Medal "100th Anniversary of liberation from Ottoman rule"
- Medal "100th Anniversary of the birth of Georgy Dimitrov"
- Medal "40th Anniversary of victory over Hitler's Fascism" (Bulgaria, 1985)
- Order of Merit of the Hungarian People's Republic, 3rd class (4 April 1950)
- Medal "Brotherhood in Arms" in Gold (Hungarian People's Republic, 29 September 1985)
- Star of People's Friendship, 3rd class (GDR, 23 February 1978)
- Medal "Artur Becker", 1st class (FDJ, 23 May 1980)
- Medal "Sino-Soviet Friendship" (PRC, 23 February 1955)
- Medal "20 Years of the Revolutionary Military Council of Cuba" (22 February 1978)
- Medal "30 Years of the Revolutionary Military Council of Cuba" (1986)
- Order of the Red Banner (Mongolian People's Republic, 7 June 1971)
- Medal "30 Years of the victory at Khalkin Gol"
- Medal "40 Years of the victory at Khalkin Gol"
- Medal "50 Years of the Mongolian People's Republic"
- Medal "60 Years of the Mongolian People's Republic"
- Medal "50 Years of the UAHB"
- Medal "50 Years of the Armed Forces of Mongolia"
- Medal "30 Years of Victory over Japan"
- Officer of the Legion of Merit (10 May 1945)
- Bronze Star Medal (10 May 1945)
- Medal "For the Oder, Neisse and the Baltic Sea" (7 May 1985)
- Medal "Brotherhood in Arms"
- Order of Polonia Restituta, Officer's Cross (11 June 1973)
- Order of Tudor Vladimirescu, 2nd class (10 January 1974)
- Order of Tudor Vladimirescu, 3rd class (24 October 1979)
- Medal "25 Years of the liberation of Romania"
- Medal "30 Years of the liberation of Romania"
- Order of Klement Gottwald (1969)
- Medal "For Strengthening of Friendship in Arms", 1st class (1970)
- Medal "50 Years of the Communist Party of Czechoslovakia"
- Medal "30 Years of the liberation of Czechoslovakia by the Red Army"

== Notes ==
Military offices
Preceded by Ivan Tutarinov	Commander of the Soviet Airborne Forces; 1961–1979	Succeeded by Dmitri Sukhorukov
Preceded by ??	Deputy Commander of the Soviet Airborne Forces; 1959–1961	Succeeded by ??
Preceded by Alexander Gorbatov	Commander of the Soviet Airborne Forces; 1954–1959	Succeeded by Ivan Tutarinov
Preceded by Andrei Bondarev	Commander of the 37th Guards Airborne Corps; 1950–1954	Succeeded by Alexander Golovanov
