= 28th Rifle Corps =

- Allegiance: Soviet Union
- Branch: Soviet Red Army
- Engagements: Eastern Front (World War II); Operation Barbarossa

The 28th Rifle Corps was a corps of the Soviet Red Army. It was part of the 4th Army. It took part in the Great Patriotic War.

== Organization ==
- 6th Rifle Division
- 42nd Rifle Division
- 75th Rifle Division

== Commanders ==
Major General V. S. Popov Vasily Popov
