= Ivan Tutarinov =

Red Army colonel general

Ivan Vasilyevich Tutarinov
- Tutarinov, c. 1943-1945
- Native name: Иван Васильевич Тутаринов
- Born: 19 June 1904; Krasny Yar village, Astrakhan Governorate, Russian Empire
- Died: 19 June 1978 (aged 74) Moscow, Soviet Union
- Allegiance: Soviet Union
- Branch: Red Army; Soviet airborne
- Service years: 1923–1972
- Rank: Colonel general
- Commands: 77th Cavalry Division; 12th Kuban Cossack Cavalry Division; 9th Guards Cossack Cavalry Division; Soviet airborne Ural Military District
- Conflicts: World War II; Invasion of Poland; Winter War; Odessa Offensive
- Awards: Order of Lenin

Ivan Vasilyevich Tutarinov (Russian: Иван Васильевич Тутаринов; 19 June 1904 – 19 June 1978) was a Red Army colonel general who commanded the Soviet airborne from 1959 to 1961. Tutarinov fought in World War II as the commander of the 12th Kuban Cossack Cavalry Division before being wounded in July 1944.

== Early life ==
Tutarinov was born on 19 June 1904 in the village of Krasny Yar in the Astrakhan Governorate. He was an Astrakhan Cossack. Before joining the Red Army in September 1923, Tutarinov worked in the local Cheka, the local Politburo, the Fisheries Trust and the Komsomol district committees.

== Interwar ==
In the Red Army, he was assigned to the 3rd Samara Cavalry School. When that was disbanded in September 1924, Tutarinov was reassigned to the 2nd Borisoglebsk-Leningrad Cavalry School. After graduating in September 1926, he was posted to the 63rd Cavalry Regiment of the 1st Special Cavalry Brigade in Moscow. In this regiment, he became a platoon commander, an acting squadron commander and the regimental acting assistant chief of staff.

Tutarinov graduated from the Novocherkassk cavalry commander refresher courses in June 1931, after which he became a squadron commander in the regiment. In October 1932, he became the assistant to the regimental chief of staff. In November 1936, Tutarinov graduated from the Frunze Military Academy and was appointed chief of the 2nd Cavalry Division headquarters. In November 1937, he became chief of staff of the division's 61st Cavalry Regiment. From January to July 1939, he temporarily commanded a regiment, after which he became chief of a regiment in the 36th Cavalry Division, which he led during the Soviet invasion of Poland. In February 1940, he became chief of staff of the 36th Cavalry Division, with which he served in the Winter War. In March, Tutarinov became the 14th Mechanized Corps' chief of staff.

== World War II ==
Tutarinov fought in the initial attempt of 14th Mechanized Corps to recapture Brest at the beginning of Operation Barbarossa and was wounded. In September 1941, he became the commander of the 77th Cavalry Division. In January 1942, the division was transferred to the 14th Cavalry Corps in Arkhangelsk Military District. In April, the division was subordinated to the 2nd Shock Army and soon disbanded. In May, Tutarinov became the commander of the 12th Kuban Cossack Cavalry Division in the North Caucasus Military District, charged with the defence of the Taganrog Bay shore. In July, it participated in the Armavir-Maikop Defensive Operation, where it covered the withdrawal of 18th Army. On 27 August, it became the 9th Guards Cossack Cavalry Division and Tutarinov was promoted to Major general. In September, the division was transferred to the Transcaucasian Front and fought in the Nalckik-Ordzhonikidze Defensive Operation. In January 1943, the division fought in battles near Rostov During the Donbass Strategic Offensive, the division captured Tokmak. In October, it became part of the 4th Ukrainian Front and in November fought on the Isthmus of Perekop.

In March 1944, Tutarinov led the division in the Bereznegovatoye–Snigirevka Offensive and the Odessa Offensive. At the end of May, the division became part of Stavka reserves. At the beginning of June, the division was transferred to the 1st Belorussian Front, where it fought in Operation Bagration. In July, Tutarinov was wounded and spent two months in convalescence. In September, he became the commander of the 2nd Cavalry School in Tambov. In March 1945, Tutarinov became the chief of the combat training of Red Army cavalry staff.

== Postwar ==
Tutarinov became the chief of the Combat Training department in April 1946. In July 1947, he became the deputy chief of staff of the cavalry. Afterwards, he studied at the Voroshilov Military Academy of the USSR Army General Staff, from which he graduated in December 1951. Tutarinov was then appointed deputy chief of staff for the Ural Military District. In March 1954, Tutarinov became the deputy chief of staff of the Carpathian Military District. Tutarinov was transferred to become the chief of staff of the Siberian Military District in November 1956. In December, he became the chief of staff of the Southern Group of Forces and in April 1958 became the group's deputy commander. After the demotion of Vasily Margelov, Tutarinov became the commander of the Soviet airborne in March 1959. On 9 May 1961, Tutarinov was promoted to Colonel general and was appointed commander of the Urals Military District in July. In 1962, Tutarinov was a deputy of the Supreme Soviet of the Soviet Union. In September 1965, Tutarinov became a representative of the Warsaw Pact Supreme Command to the Hungarian People's Army, with which he coordinated parts of Operation Danube. In September 1972, Tutarinov retired. He died in Moscow on 19 June 1978.
