= 14th Mechanized Corps =

- Active: 1941
- Country: Soviet Union
- Branch: Red Army
- Type: Mechanized corps
- Engagements: World War II: Battle of Białystok–Minsk

Commanders
- Notable commanders: Stepan Oborin; Ivan Tutarinov

The 14th Mechanized Corps (Military Unit Number 8535) was a mechanized corps of the Red Army. Formed in March 1941 and stationed in western Belarus, the corps was destroyed in the Battle of Białystok–Minsk in June of the same year.

== History ==
The corps was formed in March 1941 at Kobryn under the command of Major General Stepan Oborin as part of the 4th Army in the Western Special Military District. Colonel Ivan Tutarinov was its chief of staff. The corps' 22nd Tank Division was formed from the 29th Tank Brigade in the southern military camp on the outskirts of Brest. The 30th Tank Division was formed from the 32nd Tank Brigade in Pruzhany, later moving to Slobodka. The howitzer artillery regiments of the divisions were formed from howitzer artillery battalions of the 4th Army's rifle divisions. The 205th Motorized Division was formed and stationed in Bereza Kartuska and the surrounding villages. It was formed from the 3rd Motorized Machine Gun Artillery Brigade in the 42nd Rifle Division's barracks, after the 42nd had moved to Brest. The 205th Division had a low level of combat readiness. From mid-June the corps began creating a field command post in the area of Tevli. The corps was equipped with 534 tanks, most of which were the obsolete T-26. The corps had half of its authorized 1,031 tanks.

Oborin spent 21 June, the day before the German invasion of the Soviet Union, inspecting the 22nd Tank Division, one of whose regiments had returned from exercises. In the evening, Oborin and 22nd Tank Division commander Viktor Puganov went to the artillery range south of the division's base. They planned exercises with the 28th Rifle Corps' artillery and the division's tanks for the next day. Most of Puganov's tanks were at the ranges near Zhabinka. By order of Tutarinov, a regiment of the 30th Tank Division spent the day at the range in the Poddubno area. Division commander Colonel Semyon Bogdanov and 4th Army chief of staff Colonel Leonid Sandalov attended the regiment's exercise in the afternoon.

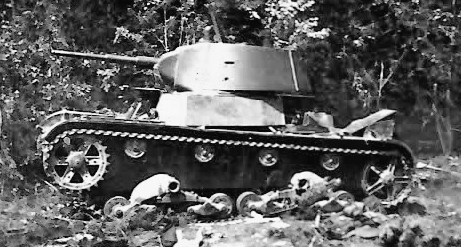
A destroyed T-26 of the type used by the corps

=== Battle ===
The 205th Motorized Division deployed forward under attack from German aircraft on the morning of 22 June. The 30th Tank Division's 61st Tank Regiment concentrated west of Pruzhany by 0900. The division formed two columns, reinforced by artillery. The German artillery bombardment on the morning of 22 June destroyed much of the 22nd Tank Division's fuel, supplies, and ammunition at Brest. Air raids on the corps headquarters destroyed its radio, severing communications. Oborin moved the command post to the prearranged location in the forest around Tevli. As a result of the loss of communications, the corps was not alerted until German troops had already started to cross the Bug River. A tank battalion from the 22nd Tank Division was sent towards the river and was unable to stop the crossing. By the end of the morning, the combat units of the two tank divisions were around Zhabinka. At 1200, the 30th Tank Division sent a tank regiment into a counterattack against German amphibious tanks crossing the Lesnaya River to the north of Brest, which was repulsed by German air attacks. Oborin put the 14th Mechanized Corps on the defensive and ordered a counterattack with the entire corps the next morning. Attacking on the morning of 23 June, the 200 T-26s of the 22nd and 30th destroyed numerous German tanks but suffered heavier losses.

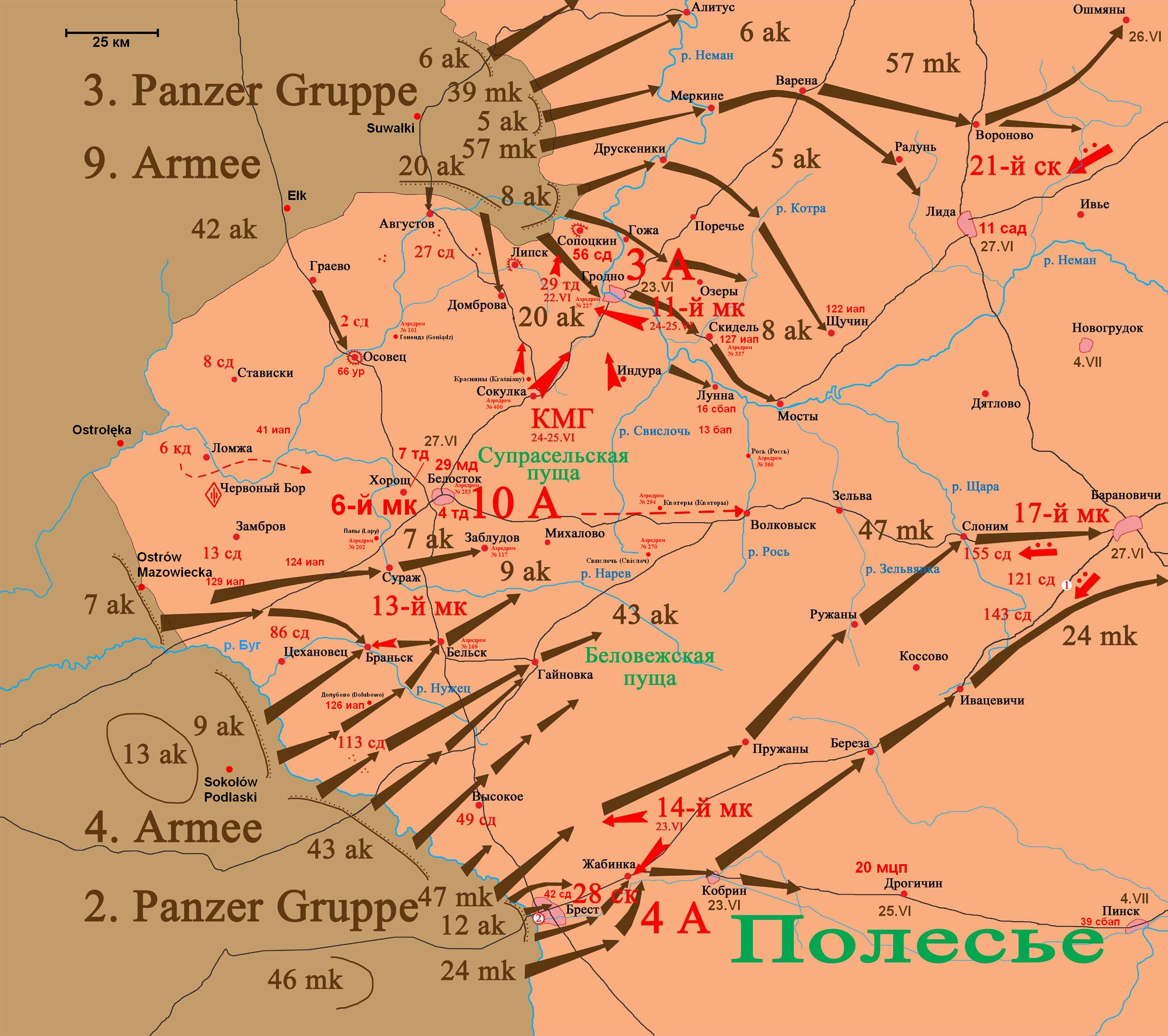
German advances. June 1941

The German forces continued their attack, inflicting heavy losses on the 22nd Tank Division and killing Puganov. The 30th Tank Division was broken through by the advance. Pruzhany and Kobrin were captured by German troops. Oborin was wounded and flew to Moscow to receive treatment, but he was arrested for desertion and later shot. After that, Tutarinov became the corps commander. The corps retreated towards Pinsk to the east. Until 28 June the corps held the Kalita-Omgovichi-Voloshevo line, blocking the German advance on the Warsaw Highway. During the fighting corps commissar Ivan Nosovsky was killed and Tutarinov wounded and evacuated. Now Bogdanov took command of the corps, which began withdrawing towards Osipovichi. By 1 July the corps had been reduced to 1,825 men with two T-26s. The corps was across the Dnieper by 3 July. The corps left the operational army on 30 June.
