= 30th Tank Division (Soviet Union) =

Tank division of the Soviet military

30th Tank Division (March 1941 – July 1941)
- Active: March 1941–July 1941
- Country: Soviet Union
- Branch: Red Army, Soviet Army
- Type: Armoured
- Size: Division

The 30th Tank Division (Military Unit Number 9465) was a Division sized unit of the Red Army that existed from March 1941–July 1941.

Formed in March 1941 and stationed in western Belarus (Pruzhany), the division was destroyed in the Battle of Białystok–Minsk in June of the same year.

== History of division formation ==
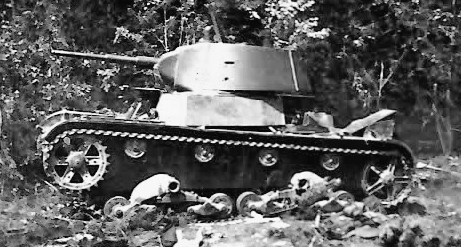
A destroyed T-26 of the type used by the division

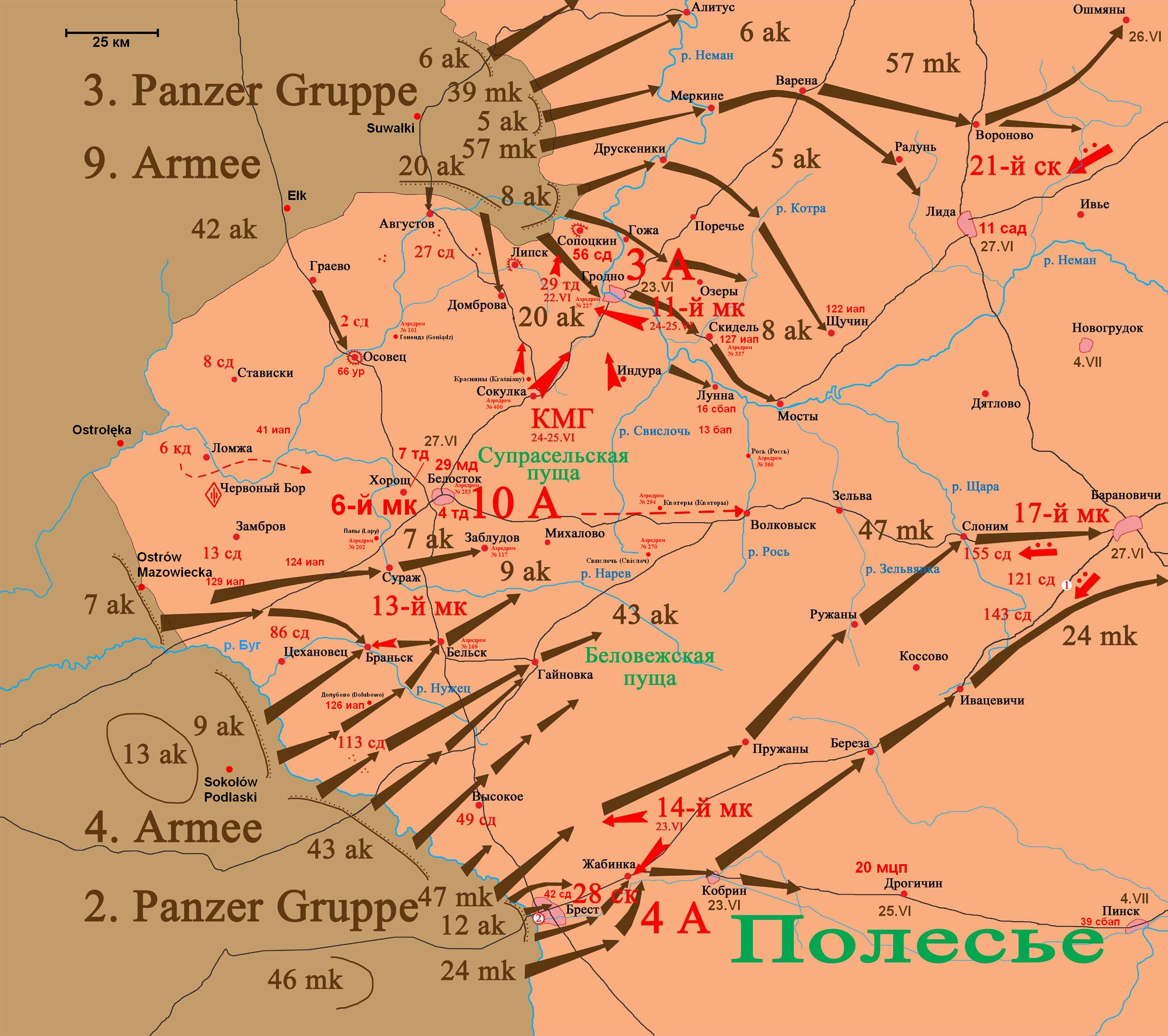
German advances. June 1941

The division began forming in February–March 1941 in the Western special military district as part of the 14th mechanized corps at the base of the 32nd tank brigade in the southern military townlet on the outskirts of Brest.

The corps was equipped with 235 tanks, most of which were the obsolete T-26. The corps had half of its authorized 375 tanks.

=== Battle ===
The 30th Tank Division's 61st Tank Regiment concentrated west of Pruzhany by 0900. The division formed two columns, reinforced by artillery.

Attacking on the morning of 23 June, the 200 T-26s of the 22nd and 30th destroyed numerous German tanks but suffered heavier losses.

The German forces continued their attack, inflicting heavy losses on the 22nd Tank Division and killing Puganov.

== Formation ==
The division was formed in March 1941 and had the following structure:

  - 60th Tank Regiment
  - 61st Tank Regiment
  - 30th Motorized Rifle Regiment
  - 30th Motorized Howitzer Regiment
  - 30th Reconnaissance Battalion
  - 30th Motorized Anti-Aircraft Artillery Battalion
  - 30th Motorized Pontoon Battalion

== Bibliography ==
- Forczyk, Robert (2014). Tank Warfare on the Eastern Front 1941–1942: Schwerpunkt. Barnsley, South Yorkshire: Pen & Sword. ISBN 9781781590089.
- Glantz, David M. (2010). Barbarossa Derailed: The German Advance to Smolensk, the Encirclement Battle, and the First and Second Soviet Counteroffensives, 10 July – 24 August 1941. Philadelphia: Casemate. ISBN 9781906033729.
