= Stepan Oborin =

Soviet general

- Native name: Степан Ильич Оборин
- Born: 15 August 1892; Kamenka, Novotorzhsky Uyezd, Tver Governorate, Russian Empire
- Died: 16 October 1941 (aged 49) Kommunarka shooting ground, Moscow Oblast, Soviet Union
- Allegiance: Russian Empire; Soviet Union
- Branch: Imperial Russian Army; Red Army
- Service years: 1913–17; 1918–22; 1923–41
- Rank: Major general
- Commands: 136th Rifle Division; 14th Mechanized Corps
- Conflicts: World War I; Russian Civil War; World War II; Winter War; Eastern Front; Battle of Białystok–Minsk
- Awards: Order of the Red Banner

Stepan Ilyich Oborin (Russian: Степа́н Ильи́ч Обо́рин; 15 August 1892 – 16 October 1941) was a Red Army major general. Oborin served as a gunner in the Imperial Russian Army in World War I and subsequently joined the Red Army. He fought in the Russian Civil War and became an artillery officer. He led the artillery of the 19th Rifle Corps in the Winter War. After the end of the war, he became commander of the 136th Rifle Division and then the 14th Mechanized Corps. The corps was destroyed in the Battle of Białystok–Minsk after the German invasion of the Soviet Union. Oborin was wounded during the battle and flew back to Moscow for treatment. He was arrested for desertion, sentenced to death, and shot on 16 October 1941. Oborin was posthumously rehabilitated in 1957.

== Early life, World War I, and Russian Civil War ==
Oborin was born on 15 August 1892 in the village of Kamenka in Tver Governorate to a working-class family. He graduated from the parish school in 1903 and became a textile worker. In October 1913, he was drafted into the Imperial Russian Army. He served as a Rjadovoy in the 1st Siberian Division. Oborin graduated from a training unit a year later and became a non-commissioned officer. He fought in World War I on the Western Front in a Siberian Howitzer Artillery Battalion as an artillery observer. He was wounded. Oborin's last rank in the Imperial Army was Junior Feuerwerker. In February 1917, Oborin was discharged from the army due to illness. In December, he became chief of intelligence of the 3rd Tver Revolutionary Partisan Group.

Oborin joined the Red Army in June 1918, fighting in the Russian Civil War. He fought on the Eastern Front and the Southern Front. Oborin became a gun commander of the 1st Light Artillery Battery at the headquarters of the 3rd Army's special units. From April 1919, he served in the 30th Rifle Division as a battery starshina, platoon commander, and finally assistant battery commander in the howitzer artillery battalion. In May 1919, he joined the Communist Party of the Soviet Union. From October 1920, Oborin served with the 4th Army fighting against the White Army in Crimea.

== Interwar ==
Between 1921 and 1922 Oborin was a battery commander in the 30th Rifle Division. He became a reservist in December 1922 and returned to active duty in March 1923, continuing as a battery commander in the 30th Artillery Regiment. Oborin graduated from the artillery officers' refresher courses in 1926 and became head of the regimental school from January 1927. In November, he became a battalion commander in the 30th Artillery Regiment. In September 1930, Oborin became assistant to the commander of the 123rd Howitzer Artillery Regiment. From September 1931, Oborin was chief of artillery of the 2nd Mechanized Brigade. In November 1933, he became the commander and commissar of the 73rd Artillery Regiment. Oborin again graduated from the artillery officers' refresher courses in 1934 and in March became head of the course. In April 1936, Oborin became commander of the 11th Rifle Division's artillery regiment. In February 1938, he became head of the divisional artillery.

== Winter War and World War II ==
In December 1939, Oborin became head of the 19th Rifle Corps artillery. He fought in the Winter War. Corps commander Makar Teryokhin recommended him for promotion to Kombrig, stating that the artillery under Oborin's leadership had "played a decisive role in breaking through the Mannerheim Line". In 1940, Oborin was awarded the Order of the Red Banner. In May 1940, Oborin became commander of the 136th Rifle Division. On 4 June 1940, he was promoted to Major General. In March 1941 he took command of the 14th Mechanized Corps. As part of the 4th Army, the corps was involved in the Battle of Białystok–Minsk after the German invasion of the Soviet Union on 22 June 1941. The corps fought in counterattacks in the area of Brest and Kobryn, in which it suffered heavy losses. He was wounded on 25 June and flew back to Moscow for treatment. On 8 July, Oborin was arrested on charges of desertion. He was also blamed for the losses of the corps during the fighting. On 13 August, he was sentenced to death. Oborin was executed on 16 October at the Kommunarka shooting ground. On 11 January 1957, Oborin was posthumously rehabilitated.
