= Aleksandr Korobkov =

Soviet general

Aleksandr Andreyevich Korobkov (Russian: Александр Андреевич Коробков; 20 June 1897 – 22 July 1941) was a Red Army major general who commanded the 4th Army in the early stages of the Axis invasion of the Soviet Union (Operation Barbarossa).

== Early life, World War I, and Russian Civil War ==
A Russian, Aleksandr Andreyevich Korobkov was born to a peasant family on 20 June 1897 in the city of Petrovsk, Petrovsky Uyezd, Saratov Governorate. He served in the Imperial Russian Army from August 1915 during World War I, graduating from the Orenburg School of Praporshchiks during the next year. Sent to the Southwestern Front, Korobkov served as a platoon commander and in December 1917 after the October Revolution was elected company commander, leaving the Imperial Army when it dissolved in February 1918 with the rank of podporuchik.

Later that year, Korobkov began his service in the Red Army and joined the Communist Party, becoming a platoon and then company commander from September. Wounded in battle, he was sent to study at the General Staff Academy.

== Interwar period ==
Korobkov served as assistant inspector of infantry of the Volga Military District and Western Front between January and September 1921. Graduating from the Military Academy of the Red Army (the renamed General Staff Academy) in 1922, he commanded a company in the North Caucasus Military District to gain command experience in 1922 and 1923. Korobkov served as chief of the operations and personnel section of the staff of the 2nd Caucasian Rifle Division from August 1923, and in November of that year became assistant chief of the mobilization department of the district staff. Rising to chief of the department in August 1924, Korobkov took command of the 25th Rifle Regiment of the 9th Don Rifle Division in December of that year. He became political commissar of the regiment as well in June 1926 and in December of that year became military instructor of the Kharkov Communist University, and transferred to serve as military instructor of the Saratov Communist University in September 1928.

After serving as chief of staff of the 95th Rifle Division of the Ukrainian Military District from January 1931, Korobkov became assistant inspector of rifle and tactical training of the army in November. He completed the Higher Officers' Improvement Course (KUVNAS) at the Frunze Military Academy in 1932, and later served as assistant inspector of infantry of the army. When personal military ranks were created, Korobkov became a kombrig on 17 January 1936. From November 1936 he was commander and commissar of the 100th Rifle Division of the Kiev Military District. From May 1939 he commanded the 16th Rifle Corps of the Belorussian Special Military District (renamed the Western Special Military District), being promoted to komdiv on 25 September. His rank converted to major general on 4 June 1940 when the Red Army introduced general officer ranks, Korobkov became commander of the 4th Army of the district in January 1941. He was awarded the Order of the Red Banner in 1940.

== World War II ==
After Operation Barbarossa began on 22 June, Korobkov's army was destroyed in the Battle of Białystok–Minsk. On 30 June, "for loss of control of the army troops by the headquarters in critical situations and indecision and inaction," Korobkov was relieved of command. Arrested on 9 July, he was sentenced to death on 22 July for "inaction, negligence and the collapse of command and control," and executed in Moscow the same day, exactly a month after the war began. Korobkov was posthumously rehabilitated in 1957.

== Awards and honors ==
Korobkov was a recipient of the following decorations:

- Order of the Red Banner (1940)
- Jubilee Medal "XX Years of the Workers' and Peasants' Red Army" (1938)
- Honorary weapon
