= Vasily Pavlovich Sokolov =

Soviet Army major general

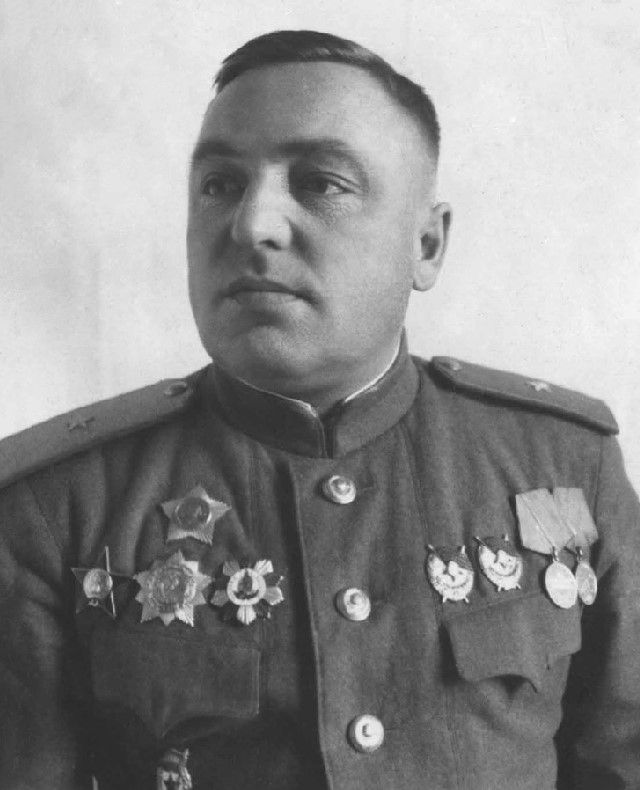
- Sokolov, 1945
- Born: 16 June 1902; Kamenitsy, Sychyovsky Uyezd, Smolensk Governorate, Russian Empire
- Died: 7 January 1958 (aged 55) Voronezh, Soviet Union
- Allegiance: Russian SFSR; Soviet Union
- Branch: Red Army
- Service years: 1924–1926; 1932–1956
- Rank: Major general
- Commands: 45th Rifle Division (became 74th Guards Rifle Division); 60th Guards Rifle Division; 45th Guards Rifle Division
- Conflicts: World War II
- Awards: Hero of the Soviet Union; Order of Lenin (2); Order of the Red Banner (3); Order of Suvorov, 2nd class; Order of Kutuzov, 2nd class; Order of Bogdan Khmelnitsky, 2nd class; Order of the Red Star (2)

Vasily Pavlovich Sokolov (Russian: Василий Павлович Соколов; 16 June 1902 – 7 January 1958) was a Soviet Army major general and a Hero of the Soviet Union.

After conscript service as a junior officer, Sokolov became a militsiya officer but was recalled to active duty in the early 1930s. He held staff positions and after Operation Barbarossa served as a division chief of staff and regimental commander. Sokolov commanded the 45th Rifle Division during the Battle of Stalingrad, and continued in that position after the division became the 74th Guards Rifle Division. Severely wounded in late 1943, he returned to action as commander of the 60th Guards Rifle Division. Sokolov led the latter for the remainder of the war and was made a Hero of the Soviet Union for his leadership of it during the Battle of Berlin. Postwar, he held posts with the Soviet Military Administration in Germany and finished his career in the 1950s as an advisor to the East German military.

== Early life and prewar service ==
A Russian, Sokolov was born to a peasant family on 16 June 1902 in the village of Kamenitsy in Smolensk Governorate. He graduated from primary school and worked as a laborer before graduating from a vocational school. Conscripted into the Red Army in October 1924, he was sent to the one-year cadet detachment of the 22nd Rifle Regiment of the 8th Rifle Division at Bobruisk. After graduating in November 1925, he re-enlisted for another year and remained with the 22nd as a junior commander. Transferred to the reserve in September 1926, Sokolov worked as a senior militsiya officer, chief of criminal investigations, and assistant chief of the district militsiya department in Cherepanovo. He rose to inspector of the militsiya sub-department of the Tomsk Okrug Administrative Department in May 1929, and in 1930 began studying at the physical and mathematical sciences department of the Tomsk State University.

Recalled from the university by the army on 15 January 1932, Sokolov was appointed a platoon commander in the 232nd Tomsk Rifle Regiment of the 78th Rifle Division. He became chief of the 4th department of the staff of the division in June 1933 and in January 1935 was appointed chief of staff of a battalion of the 232nd Rifle Regiment. Transferred to the 313th Rifle Regiment of the 105th Rifle Division of the Special Red Banner Far Eastern Army in August of that year, Sokolov served as assistant regimental chief of staff and acting reconnaissance company.

Sent to study at the Frunze Military Academy in September 1937, Sokolov became chief of the reconnaissance department of the staff of the 51st Rifle Division after his graduation in October 1939. With the 51st, Sokolov fought in the Winter War in the fighting on the Karelian Isthmus, and was awarded the Order of the Red Star. Appointed chief of the operational department of the division staff in June 1940, he participated in the Soviet occupation of Bessarabia. In May 1941, now a captain, Sokolov was transferred to hold the same position with the 3rd Airborne Corps, forming at Pervomaysk.

== World War II ==
After Operation Barbarossa began, Sokolov's unit was relocated to the vicinity of Kiev and fought in the battle for the city. Appointed corps chief of staff in August, Sokolov served with the corps in defensive actions in the area of Oster, Konotop, and Belopolets in September before it retreated towards Kursk. In the fighting, the corps was surrounded for five days before it broke out to reach Soviet lines. The corps subsequently fought in the area of Tim, where it was reorganized into the 87th Rifle Division of the 40th Army. In the latter, Sokolov, now a major, was appointed commander of the 283rd Rifle Regiment. When the 87th was converted into the 13th Guards Rifle Division in March 1942, his regiment became the 42nd Guards.

Sokolov was appointed commander of the 45th Rifle Division, which was on the defensive in the area of Novoposelok, Leshchplota, Bogdanovka, Milovatka, and Selishche, on 10 March. After the division was surrounded, he was ordered to conduct a fighting retreat towards Stary Oskol by the Bryansk Front command on 3 July. By 20 July the division had broken out and was relocated to Krasny Liman, Voronezh Oblast for rebuilding. The division was sent to the Stalingrad Front on 18 October, joining the 62nd Army in the Battle of Stalingrad. For the next hundred days Sokolov led the 45th in fierce fighting at the Krasny Oktyabr and Barrikady factories. For its actions in the urban combat, the 45th was converted into the 74th Guards Rifle Division on 1 March 1943, with Sokolov, who was promoted to major general on the same day, continuing in command.

After the end of the surrender of the German troops trapped in Stalingrad, Sokolov's division remained in the city for several weeks with the Stalingrad Group of Forces. The 74th Guards became part of the 29th Guards Rifle Corps of the army, which was converted into the 8th Guards Army, and participated in the construction of a defensive line on the left bank of the Oskol. From May they defended positions on the Seversky Donets, and from July fought in the Izyum–Barvenkovo Offensive and the Donbass Strategic Offensive. During the latter, on 9 September, Sokolov was severely wounded in the area of Barvenkovo and evacuated to a hospital. After recovering, he returned to the 74th Guards, but on 29 November was relieved of command.

Given command of the 60th Guards Rifle Division in December, Sokolov led it for the rest of the war. With the 6th Army of the 3rd Ukrainian Front, the division fought in the Nikopol–Krivoi Rog Offensive and the Bereznegovatoye–Snigirevka Offensive in the first months of 1944, advancing 300 kilometers (190 mi). In late March the division was transferred to the 46th Army for the Odessa Offensive, and on 14 April crossed the Dniester near Olănești and fought to retain its bridgehead. Sokolov led the division in the Second Jassy–Kishinev Offensive as part of the 5th Shock Army, during which it fought to capture Kishinev.

Transferred with the army to the 1st Belorussian Front in November 1944, Sokolov led the division in the Vistula–Oder Offensive and the Berlin Offensive in 1945. In the Vistula–Oder Offensive, the division broke through German defenses on 14 January and in fifteen days advanced 570 kilometers (350 mi) to capture a bridgehead on the west bank of the Oder. During the Berlin Offensive, the division captured Altlandsberg, then fought its way into Berlin, capturing the quarters of Biesdorf, Friedrichsfelde, Rummelsburg. Sokolov was made a Hero of the Soviet Union on 29 May for his leadership of the division, which was awarded the Order of Suvorov, 2nd class for its actions.

== Postwar ==
After the end of the war, Sokolov continued to command the division as part of the Group of Soviet Occupation Forces in Germany (GSOVG). After it was disbanded in December 1946, Sokolov was appointed chief of the military department of the Military Directorate of the Soviet Military Administration in Germany (SVAG) in March 1947. From November 1948 he was chief of the combat training department and deputy chief of the Commandant's Service and Combat Training Directorate of the SVAG. Having completed the Higher Academic Course at the Voroshilov Military Academy between May 1949 and June 1950, Sokolov was sent to the Leningrad Military District to command the 45th Guards Rifle Division. In October 1952 he returned to the GSOVG, where he became senior military advisor to the chief of the territorial directorate under the Kasernierte Volkspolizei. Retired in March 1956, Sokolov lived in Voronezh, where he died on 7 January 1958.

== Awards and honors ==
Sokolov was a recipient of the following decorations:

- Hero of the Soviet Union
- Order of Lenin (2)
- Order of the Red Banner (3)
- Order of Suvorov, 2nd class
- Order of Kutuzov, 2nd class
- Order of Bogdan Khmelnitsky, 2nd class
- Order of the Red Star (2)
- Medals
- Foreign orders and medals
