= Donbas offensive =

Donbas offensive may refer to the following battles:

- Donbas strategic offensive (July 1943) ("Mius-Donets Offensive"), attack by the Soviet Southern Front and Southwestern Front against the Nazi Army Group South from mid-July to early August 1943
- Donbas strategic offensive (August 1943), attack by Southern Front and Southwestern Front against Army Group South from mid-August to late September 1943
- Battle of Donbas (2022), attack by the Russian Armed Forces against the Armed Forces of Ukraine between April and September 2022

== See also ==
- Battle of Donbas (disambiguation)
