= Yefim Pushkin =

Soviet lieutenant general (1899–1944)

Yefim Grigoryevich Pushkin
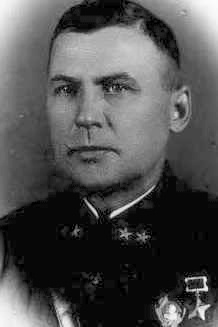
- Born: 28 January 1899; Novotroitskaya village, Kuban Oblast, Russian Empire
- Died: 11 March 1944 (aged 45) Bashtanka, Ukrainian SSR, Soviet Union
- Allegiance: Russian SFSR; Soviet Union
- Branch: Red Army (later Soviet Army)
- Service years: 1918–1944
- Rank: Lieutenant general
- Commands: 32nd Tank Division; 8th Tank Division; 23rd Tank Corps
- Conflicts: Russian Civil War; World War II †
- Awards: Hero of the Soviet Union

Yefim Grigoryevich Pushkin (Russian: Ефим Григорьевич Пушкин; 28 January 1899 – 11 March 1944) was a Red Army lieutenant general and a Hero of the Soviet Union.

== Early life ==
Yefim Grigoryevich Pushkin was born on 28 January 1899 in the stanitsa of Novotroitskaya, Labinsky otdel, Kuban oblast. He lived in the village of Krutets, Saratov Governorate. Before military service, Pushkin worked in the fishing industry in Kharbayskaya volost, Astrakhan Governorate.

== World War I and Russian Civil War ==
He joined the Red Army in January 1918 during the Russian Civil War, serving as a clerk at the headquarters of the 11th Army in the North Caucasus. In May he was transferred to the 3rd Kuban Cavalry Brigade of the 3rd Rifle Division, with which he served as a quartermaster in the North Caucasus Regiment. With this unit he participated in battles on the Southern Front against the Volunteer Army. In October, being a platoon commander, Pushkin took part in the suppression of the Astrakhan revolt. Selected for junior commander training, Pushkin completed the Oryol Cavalry Courses between May and October, and upon graduation was dispatched to the Western Front as a squadron commander of the Kamo Partisan Detachment. In December 1919 he was sent to the Southern Front, where with the 1st Taman Regiment of the Taman Cavalry Division he fought against the Armed Forces of South Russia as a platoon and asquadron commander. Returning to the Western Front in August 1920 with the 17th Cavalry Regiment of the 17th Rifle Division of the 16th Army he fought as a platoon commander and acting squadron commander in the Polish–Soviet War, at Gomel, Minsk, Baranovichi, and Orsha. After the end of the war, between January and July 1921, Pushkin completed the three-month cavalry refresher courses at the headquarters of the 16th Army in Mogilev, then returned to the regiment as a platoon commander. With the regiment, he took part in operations against the forces of Stanisław Bułak-Bałachowicz.

== Interwar period ==
In April 1922, Pushkin, by then an assistant squadron commander, and his regiment were sent to the Turkestan Front for the fight against the Basmachi revolt in Western, Middle, and Eastern Bukhara. In March 1923 he was transferred to command a squadron of the 76th Cavalry Regiment of the 6th Altai Cavalry Brigade, serving as acting chief of the regimental school from January to April 1925. During operations against the Basmachi, Pushkin was wounded three times and concussed once. He was recommended for the Order of the Red Banner twice for distinguishing himself in battle, but did not receive the award. In June 1925 he was transferred to the 52nd Cavalry Regiment of the 9th Crimea Cavalry Division in Gaisin, where he served as a squadron commander. In 1928 he was awarded the rights of a graduate of a normal military school. Pushkin rose to chief of the regimental school in January 1930, and to regimental chief of staff in December 1931. From May to September 1932 he completed the Leningrad Armored Commanders' Improvement Courses, then was appointed chief of staff of the 14th Mechanized Regiment of the 14th Cavalry Division in Novograd-Volynsky. From December 1938 he was an officer for special assignments at the Military Council of the Kiev Special Military District, and in September 1940 became senior assistant inspector of the district Armored Directorate. Pushkin was appointed commander of the 32nd Tank Division of the 4th Mechanized Corps of the district on 3 November of that year.

== World War II ==
After Operation Barbarossa, the German invasion of the Soviet Union, began on 22 June 1941, Pushkin continued to command the division on the Southwestern Front. During the border battles, he led the division in the Battle of Dubno. Having suffered heavy losses, the remnants of Pushkin's command were broken up to assist in the formation of new tank brigades. In early August Pushkin took command of the 8th Tank Division, which had just broken out of encirclement, on the Southwestern and Southern Fronts. The division was credited with the destruction of 80 German tanks between 19 and 25 August. In recognition of this feat, Pushkin was recommended for the title Hero of the Soviet Union, the country's highest award, by 18th Mechanized Corps commander Pyotr Volokh, and was awarded the title on 9 November. The recommendation read:

Comrade Pushkin with his decisive actions ensued the decision of the assigned objective, located at his command post under a hurricane of enemy fire, directed the battle, as a result of which the enemy suffered losses of 56 disabled tanks and two towed out of battle in the course of three days.

Comrade Pushkin, not sparing his life, inspired his subordinates to decisive actions and valor by his personnel example.

Repeated attempts of the enemy to counterattack were eliminated and the enemy suffered significant losses.

Comrade Pushkin repeatedly, placing his life in danger, himself personally brought units into battle, routing the Fascist bandits and ensuing the advance forward. In the most tense moment, when the enemy came around on the flanks, Comrade Pushkin with full composure directed the battle and not only ensued the elimination of the threat, but inflicted massive damage to the enemy and captured the commanding heights before Krinichki.

On 21 August 1941, near Dneprodzerzhinsk, leading the regiments into the attack, Comrade Pushkin destroyed enemy tanks and put them to flight, simultaneously forcing the enemy infantry to retreat six kilometers. In this six guns were captured, and ten anti-tank guns, eight mortars, eleven machine guns and up to a battalion of infantry destroyed.

The division was used to form the 130th Tank Brigade in September, and Pushkin continued as commander of the latter on the Southern Front. In March 1942 he became deputy commander of the 18th Army for tank troops.

Pushkin took command of the 23rd Tank Corps on 12 April, which he led in the Second Battle of Kharkov as part of the 6th Army of the Southwestern Front. He became acting deputy commander of the front for tank troops on 4 June and in August deputy commander of the 4th Tank Army. The army was formed from the 28th Army and joined the Stalingrad Front and then the Don Front on 28 September. He served in this role in the counterattack of the front against the German forces crossing the Don north of Kalach, during which it broke German attempts to force the Don and capture Stalingrad, and subsequently, inflicting heavy losses in personnel and equipment on the Axis forces, the corps participated in defensive battles on the outskirts of Stalingrad. In October the 65th Army was formed from the 4th Tank Army, and Pushkin appointed deputy commander of this army for tank troops.

At the end of October Pushkin returned to command the 23rd Tank Corps, then in the Reserve of the Supreme High Command, and in December it was transferred to the Southwestern Front. As part of the 5th Tank, 3rd Guards, 1st Guards, 6th, and 8th Guards Armies of the front the corps under Pushkin's command successfully fought in the Soviet counteroffensive near Stalingrad. He was promoted to the rank of general-leytenant on 18 January 1943. In the second half of January, Pushkin led the corps in the Voroshilovgrad Offensive, during which it liberated Krasnodon, Sverdlovsk, and Rovenky. Subsequently, Pushkin led the corps in the Izyum–Barvenkovo offensive, the Donbas strategic offensive, and the Zaporozhye offensive, during which it distinguished itself in the liberation of Konstantinovka, Chaplino and Zaporozhye. As part of the 3rd Guards Army of the Southern Front (the 4th Ukrainian from October), the corps fought in the Melitopol offensive. Later the corps was transferred to the 46th Army of the 3rd Ukrainian Front and fought in the Dnepropetrovsk offensive. From November 1943 the corps fought in combat actions as part of the 8th Guards Army of the front, and from December was under the direct control of the front commander. Pushkin led the corps in the Bereznegovatoye–Snigirevka offensive in March 1944. During the offensive, Pushkin was killed in a German bombing raid in the area of Bashtanka at 18:30 on 11 March. He was buried in Dnipropetrovsk (the city is since 2016 named Dnipro).

== Awards and honors ==
Pushkin received the following awards:

- Hero of the Soviet Union
- Order of Lenin
- Order of the Red Banner
- Order of Suvorov, 2nd class (2)
- Order of the Patriotic War, 1st class

A monument of to Pushkin was erected 1967 on Dnipropetrovsk's main street featuring a T-34. In January 2023 this monument was removed after the Dnipro City Council had decided the monument "has no historical or artistic value." On 5 January 2023, the day after the monument was dismantled, Mayor of Dnipro Borys Filatov claimed that Yefim Pushkin "defended our city when the Soviet command was incompetent, in just a few days, surrendering a huge industrial centre to the advancing Nazis." Filatov also claimed that the T-34 tank of the monument was of a modification of 1967 and so could have never been driven by Pushkin.

Military offices
New unit	Commander, 32nd Tank Division; November 1940–August 1941	Unit disbanded
Preceded by Pyotr Fotchenkov	Commander, 8th Tank Division (reorganized as 130th Tank Brigade); August 1941–March 1942	Succeeded by Pyotr Biryukov
New unit	Commander, 23rd Tank Corps; April–June 1942	Succeeded by Abram Khasin
Preceded by Vasily Koshelev	Commander, 23rd Tank Corps; October 1942–March 1944	Succeeded by Alexey Akhmanov
