= 74th Guards Rifle Division =

- Active: 1 Mar 1943 – 1946
- Country: Soviet Union
- Branch: Ground Forces
- Type: Infantry
- Size: Division
- Engagements: Donbass Strategic Offensive; Izyum-Barvenkovo Offensive; Barvenkov-Pavlograd Offensive; Lublin-Brest Offensive; Krivoi Rog Offensive; Nikopol Offensive; Bereznegovatoye-Snigirevka Offensive; Odessa Offensive; Vistula–Oder Offensive; Battle of the Seelow Heights; Berlin Strategic Offensive
- Decorations: Order of Lenin; Order of the Red Banner; Order of Bogdan Khmelnitsky II Class
- Battle honours: Nizhnedneprovskiy

The 74th Guards Rifle Division was a Guards infantry division of the Red Army during the Second World War. Its full formal name was the 74th Guards Nizhnedneprovskiy Order of Lenin twice Red Banner Order of Bogdan Khmelnitsky Rifle Division. It was formed from the 45th Rifle Division on 1 March 1943. The division's entire World War II service was with the 62nd Army, later the 8th Guards Army.

== World War II Service ==
=== 1943 ===
In July 1943, the Division participated in the battles on the outskirts of Izium, Izyum-Barvenkovo Offensive, in August 1943 in the Barvenkov-Pavlograd Offensive, as part of the Donbass Strategic Offensive Operation . In the Lower Dnieper Offensive Operation crossed the Dnieper south of Dnipropetrovsk. During Nizhnedneprovskiy offensive forced the Dnieper to the south of Dnipropetrovsk. Then took part in the Nikopol–Krivoi Rog Offensive.

=== 1944 ===
During the Winter Spring campaign of 1944 the division participated in the Bereznegovatoye-Snigirevka Offensive and the follow on Odessa Offensive.

In July 1944 the division participated in the Lublin-Brest Offensive as part of the Operation Bagration and the beginning of the liberation of Poland.

=== 1945 ===
In January 1945 the division was part of the Vistula–Oder Offensive and the liberation of Poland.

In April 1945 it broke through enemy defenses at the Battle of the Seelow Heights, taking part in the Berlin Strategic Offensive.

During the war the division participated in the liberation of the cities of Izium, Nikopol, Krivoy Rog, Odessa, Poznan, Lodz, and taking Kustrin.

=== Postwar ===
The division became part of the Group of Soviet Forces in Germany along with its corps and army, and was disbanded in the summer of 1946.

== Subordination ==
- South-Western Front, 62nd Army - 1 April 1943.
- South-Western Front, 8th Guards Army, 29th Guards Rifle Corps - from 5 May 1943.
- 3rd Ukrainian Front, 8th Guards Army, 29th Guards Rifle Corps - about 20 October 1943.
- 1st Belorussian Front, 8th Guards Army, 29th Guards Rifle Corps — about 15 June 1944.
- With 8th Guards Army of the 1st Belorussian Front May 1945.

== Composition ==
- 226th Guards Rifle "Lodz" Regiment
- 236th Guards Rifle Regiment
- 240th Guards Rifle Regiment
- 157th Guards Artillery Regiment
- 82nd Guards separate antitank battalion
- 399th Guards antiaircraft battery (up to 13 April 1943)
- 76th Guards intelligence company
- 85th Guards sapper battalion
- 103rd Guards separate battalion
- 584th (77th) Medical battalion
- 73rd Guards separate company chemical protection
- 725th (78th) trucking company
- 659th (79th) field bakery
- 676th (75th) Divisional veterinary hospital
- 781st Field Postal Station
- 538th field ticket office of the State Bank

== Commanders ==
- Colonel Vasily Pavlovich Sokolov (1 March 1942 - 1 September 1943), 1943 promoted to major general
- Colonel Mikhail Ivanovich Yugatov (2 September 1943 - 29 November 1943)
- Colonel Adrian T. Kuzin (30 November 1943 - 31 January 1944)
- Colonel Dmitry Yevstigneyevich Bakanov (1 February 1944 - 1 May 1944)
- Colonel Karl Karlovich Mazheika (11 May 1944 - 3 June 1944)
- Major General Dmitry Yevstigneyevich Bakanov (4 June 1944 - 5 August 1945)

== Awards ==
- Awarded the Order of Bogdan Khmelnitsky 2 degrees Order of Bogdan Khmelnitsky II degree
- 13 Feb 1944 — given the name "Nizhnedneprovskiy"
