= Battle of Donbas =

Battle of Donbas may refer to:

Russian Civil War

- Donbas-Don operation (1918)
- Battle for the Donbas (1919)
- Donbas operation (1919)

World War II

- Donbas operation (1941)
- Operation Little Saturn (1942)
- Operation Gallop (January 1943)
- Donbas strategic offensive (July 1943)
- Donbas strategic offensive (August 1943)

Russo-Ukrainian War

- War in Donbas (2014–2022)
- Eastern front of the Russo-Ukrainian war (2022–present)
  - Battle of Donbas (2022)

== See also ==
- Donbas offensive
- Battle of Dombås (1940), a World War II battle in Norway
