= Alexey Akhmanov =

Soviet army lieutenant general (1897–1949)

Alexey Osipovich Akhmanov
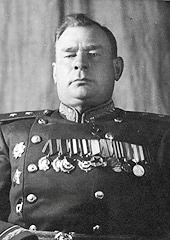
- Born: 9 March 1897; Alat village, Alatsky volost, Kazansky Uyezd, Kazan Governorate, Russian Empire
- Died: 17 November 1949 (aged 52) Minsk, Soviet Union
- Allegiance: Russian Empire; Russian SFSR; Soviet Union
- Branch: Imperial Russian Army; Red Army (later Soviet Army)
- Service years: 1915–1916; 1919–1923; 1923–1949
- Rank: Lieutenant general
- Commands: 1st Motorized Chemical Division (became 30th Chemical Tank Brigade); 27th Tank Division; 81st Tank Brigade; 23rd Tank Corps (became 23rd Tank Division)
- Conflicts: World War I; Russian Civil War; World War II
- Awards: Hero of the Soviet Union; Order of Lenin (2); Order of the Red Banner (2); Order of Kutuzov, 1st class; Order of Suvorov, 2nd class

Alexey Osipovich Akhmanov (Russian: Алексей Осипович Ахманов; 9 March [O.S. 25 February] 1897 – 17 November 1949) was a Soviet Army lieutenant general and a Hero of the Soviet Union.

Conscripted into the Imperial Russian Army during World War I, Akhmanov was captured and spent more than two years as a prisoner of war. Returning to Russia, he was drafted into the Red Army and served as a junior commander during the Russian Civil War. Akhmanov held a variety of command and staff positions during the interwar period and from the early 1930s served in mechanized units. At the outbreak of Operation Barbarossa he commanded a tank division in Belarus that was destroyed, but managed to escape encirclement with the remnants of his unit. Akhmanov served in staff positions coordinating army and front-level armored troops for the next several years of the war and in early 1944 was given command of the 23rd Tank Corps, which he led for the rest of the war. Made a Hero of the Soviet Union for his leadership of the corps in the repulse of German attempts to relieve the Siege of Budapest in early 1945, Akhmanov continued in command of the corps after the end of the war. He became commander of the armored and mechanized forces of the Belorussian Military District, but his career was cut short by suicide in 1949.

== Early life, World War I, and Russian Civil War ==
Akhmanov was born to a peasant family on 9 March [O.S. 25 February] 1897 in the village of Alat, Alatsky volost, Kazansky Uyezd, Kazan Governorate (now Vysokogorsky District of Tatarstan). He graduated from secondary school and worked in a bootmaker's workshop in Kazan before being conscripted into the Imperial Russian Army during World War I in August 1915. Serving with the 4th Siberian Rifle Regiment of the 1st Siberian Rifle Division, Akhmanov began as a private and was promoted to junior unter-ofitser after graduating from the regimental training detachment. With the regiment, he saw action on the Western Front before he was captured by German troops in July 1916. Imprisoned at the Hammerstein camp, Akhmanov was released after the end of the war in December 1918 and in January 1919 began working as a woodchopper at a bakery in Kazan.

Drafted into the Red Army in July 1919 during the Russian Civil War, Akhmanov was sent to study at the 1st Infantry Command Courses in Kazan. After graduating in March 1920, he became a platoon commander in the 4th Reserve Regiment, and in April transferred to command a company of the 113th Rifle Regiment. Akhmanov fought in Estonia and Finland, and after the end of hostilities with those countries was transferred to the Southern Front, where he served with the 131st Rifle Regiment of the 15th Inza Rifle Division as a company and then battalion commander. Akhmanov fought in battles against the Army of Wrangel at Kakhovka and in the crossing of the Sivash and the storming of the Yushun fortifications during the Perekop–Chongar Offensive. After the defeat of Wrangel, his battalion was allocated to supervise exports of bread from Taurida.

== Interwar period ==
From April 1921, Akhmanov served as assistant chief of food reconnaissance in the 131st Rifle Regiment of the 15th Rifle Division. After graduating from the Odessa Military Refresher School, he became company commander in the regiment and was sent to a physical education course in Kiev between November and December 1922 that allowed him to become a rifle and drill instructor at the 4th Kiev Artillery School upon graduation. Demobilized in September 1923, Akhmanov was again conscripted into the Red Army in December of that year and appointed an acting company commander in the 153rd Territorial Rifle Regiment at Balta, Odessa Oblast. From January 1924 he served as a company commander in the 285th Rifle Regiment of the 95th Rifle Division of the Ukrainian Military District. Detached to take the Vystrel course between September 1925 and October 1926, he returned to the regiment to serve successively as commander of a company and battery and as acting assistant regimental chief of staff. In November 1929 Akhmanov was transferred to command a company at the Kiev Infantry Commanders' Refresher Courses and from February 1930 temporarily served as chief of the training detachment of reserve political officers. He was transferred to command a battalion of the 135th Rifle Regiment of the 45th Rifle Division in October of that year, and in November 1931 shifted again to serve as assistant chief of the 1st staff section of the 80th Rifle Division.

Akhmanov moved from infantry units to the emerging Red Army mechanized forces in September 1932 when he transferred to become chief of the 2nd staff department of the 2nd Training Regiment of the 2nd Mechanized Brigade. Appointed commander of the separate tank battalion of the 8th Mechanized Brigade in 1933, Akhmanov studied at the academic courses for technical improvement of commanders and staff at the Academy of Mechanization and Motorization between January and June 1935. In April 1936 he became commander of the 100th Separate Tank Battalion at Berdichev, then studied as part of a special group at the Red Army Chemical Defense Academy from January 1937. Upon graduation in February 1938 he became commander of the 1st Motorized Regiment of the 1st Motorized Chemical Division of the Moscow Military District, and in April became division commander. Akhmanov, now a colonel, continued in command of the division when it was reorganized into the 30th Separate Chemical Tank Brigade in July of that year. After the brigade was disbanded, in July 1940 he was transferred to become deputy commander of the 18th Tank Division of the 7th Mechanized Corps. Akhmanov was transferred to command the 27th Tank Division of the newly formed 17th Mechanized Corps of the Western Special Military District on 1 April 1941.

== World War II ==
When Operation Barbarossa, the German invasion of the Soviet Union, began on 22 June 1941, Akhmanov was on leave in Kaluga, visiting his wife, Mariya Nikolaevna. In the first days of the war, he attempted to return to his division, but was unable to get through. About 10–12 kilometres (6.2–7.5 miles) from Baranovichi, Akhmanov found the rear of the 36th Tank Division, and thence went to the area of Mir, but found that there were already German troops in the vicinity. It was not until 28 June that he was able to gather the headquarters of the division and between 300 and 400 troops, the remnants of the 27th. With this force Akhmanov escaped encirclement alongside the 36th Tank Division in the area of Rudniki, continuing to collect the remnants of his unit that came in piecemeal. He ultimately managed to round up between 1,300 and 1, 500 men of the division before being ordered to lead the division to the Katkovo area on 1 July. While en route in the Yachenka area, the division came under attack from German tanks and aircraft and suffered heavy losses. Continuing east with a remaining group of between 30 and 60 officers and enlisted men, Akhmanov crossed the Svisloch river but ran into a German screening force near Zabichany. In the ensuing battle, he was concussed and his group scattered. For two days Akhmanov continued to move towards Mogilev, collecting scattered troops along the way. Near Mogilev he joined the group led by Major General Pyotr Akhlyustin, numbering between 1,000 and 1,400 men, and with it broke out of the encirclement on the night of 27 to 28 July, crossing the Sozh River in the sector of the 137th Rifle Division.

Akhmanov took simultaneous command of the 105th and 102nd Tank Divisions that were later reorganized into tank brigades during August and in September became chief of the Armored and Mechanized Forces of the 24th Army. From November he served as chief of the Armored and Mechanized Forces of the Kalinin Front, and from February 1942 he was deputy commander of the front for combat employment of tanks. During this period Akhmanov fought in the Battle of Moscow. Given command of the 81st Tank Brigade on 22 July, he was transferred in October to become deputy commander of the 1st Guards Army for tank forces, fighting with the latter in the Battle of Stalingrad as part of the Don Front. In late October, after the 1st Guards Army was disbanded, Akhmanov was appointed deputy chief for combat employment and use of tanks of the Armored and Mechanized Directorate of the Southwestern Front (the 3rd Ukrainian Front from October 1943). In this position, he participated in Operation Little Saturn, the Ostrogozhsk–Rossosh Offensive, the Donbass Strategic Offensive, and the Zaporizhia Offensive. For his "skillful coordination of tank operations with those of other branches" in these operations Akhmanov was awarded the Order of the Red Banner and promoted to major general.

From April 1944 to the end of the war, Akhmanov commanded the 23rd Tank Corps. As part of the 2nd and 3rd Ukrainian Fronts, the corps fought in the Jassy–Kishinev, Debrecen, Budapest, and Vienna Offensives. He was promoted to lieutenant general on 13 September 1944. During January and February 1945 the corps, as part of the 4th Guards Army, prevented the relief of encircled Axis forces southwest of Budapest and inflicted heavy losses on the 3rd SS Panzer Division Totenkopf and 5th SS Panzer Division Wiking. For his leadership of the corps, especially in the defeat of the German Budapest relief attempts, Akhmanov received the title Hero of the Soviet Union and was awarded the Order of Lenin on 28 April 1945.

== Postwar ==
After the end of the war, Akhmanov continued in command of the corps, which was reorganized into the 23rd Tank Division. In October 1947 he was sent to study at Higher Academic Courses at the Voroshilov Higher Military Academy. Upon graduation in April 1948 he was appointed head of the Armored and Mechanized Forces of the Belorussian Military District. Akhmanov committed suicide on 17 November 1949 and is buried in Minsk. Russian historian Mikhail Cherepanov wrote in a 2017 article that Akhmanov's suicide was an attempt to escape being arrested during the then-ongoing purge of Soviet senior officers.

== Awards ==
Hero of the Soviet Union (28 April 1945)
Order of Lenin, twice (21 February 1945, 28 April 1945)
Order of the Red Banner, twice (1 March 1943, 3 November 1944)
Order of Suvorov, 2nd class (19 March 1944)
Order of Kutuzov, 1st class (13 September 1944
Medal "For the Defence of Stalingrad" (1942)
Medal "For the Defence of Moscow" (1944)
Medal "For the Capture of Budapest" (1945)
Medal "For the Capture of Vienna" (1945)
Medal "For the Victory over Germany in the Great Patriotic War 1941–1945" (1945)
Jubilee Medal "XX Years of the Workers' and Peasants' Red Army" (22 February 1938)
