= 23rd Tank Corps =

Red Army formation

The 23rd Budapest Red Banner Order of Suvorov Tank Corps was a tank corps of the Red Army during World War II.

It was part of the "operational army" or "active army" (ru:Действующая армия и флот) from April 12, 1942, to May 9, 1945.

== History ==
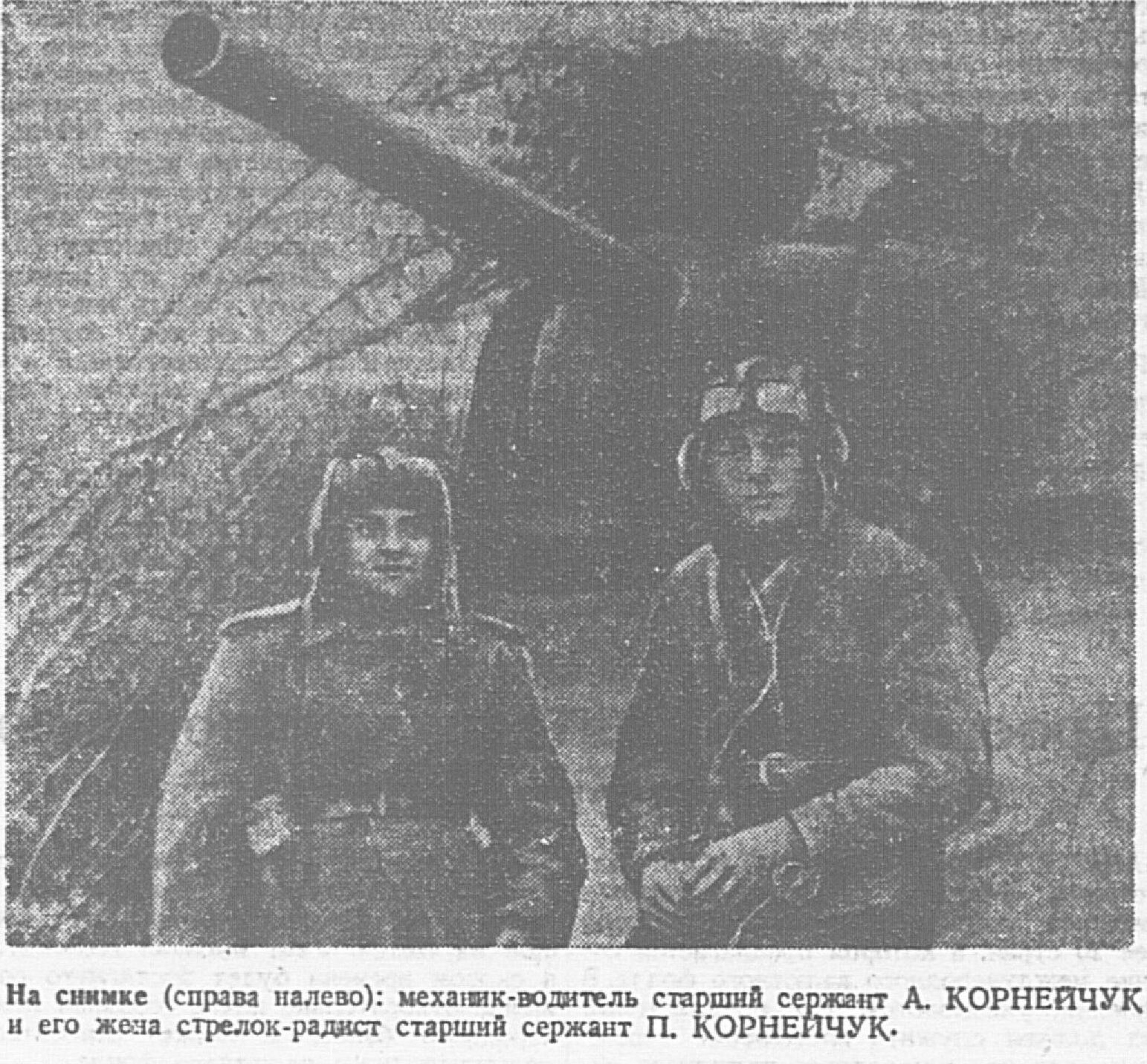
Husband and wife Senior Sergeants Aleksandr (mechanic-driver) and Polina Korneichuk (gunner-radioman), who fought together in the same T-34 tank crew of the 39th Tank Brigade in late 1943

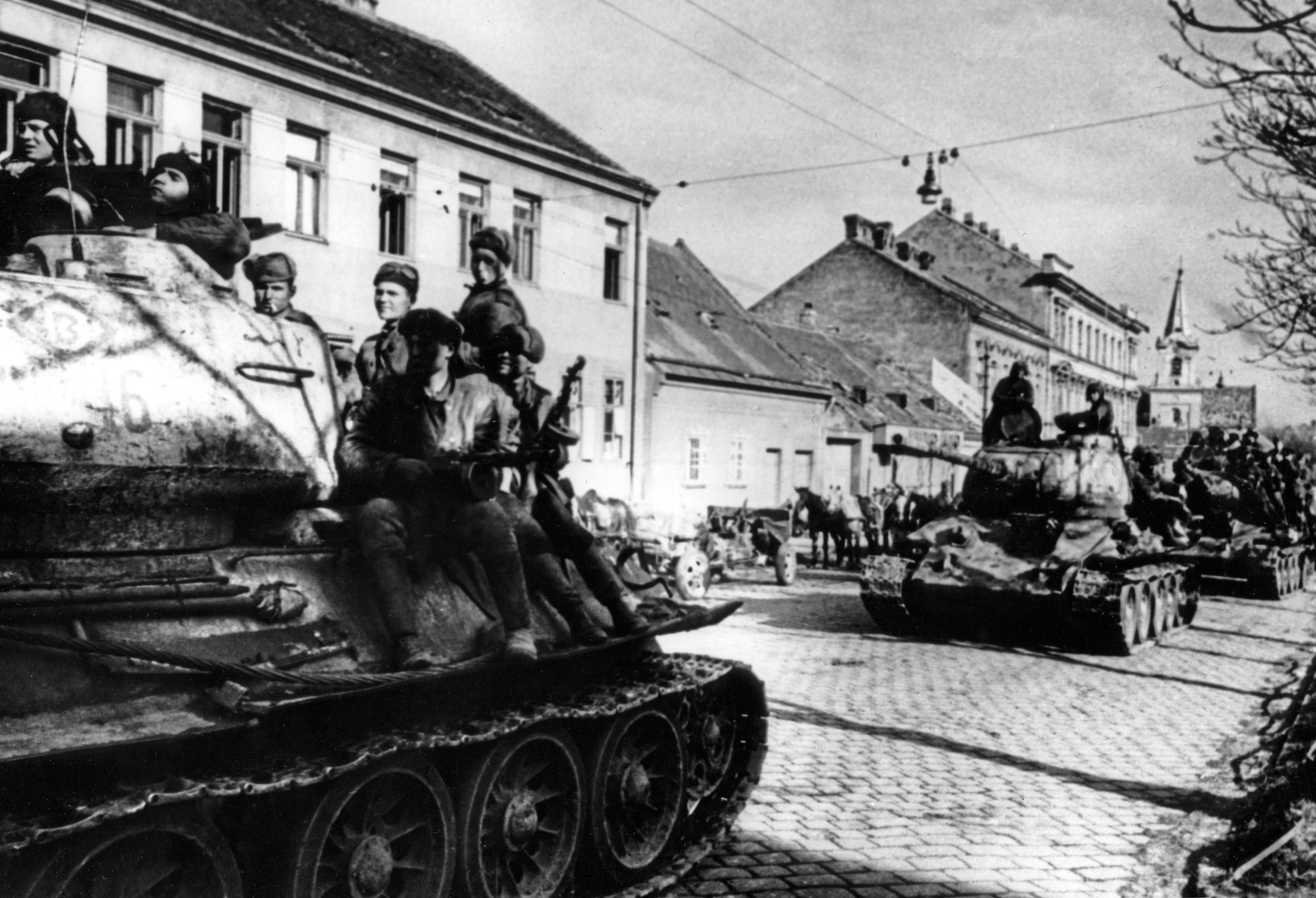
T-34-85 tanks of the corps' 3rd Tank Brigade passing through the Vienna suburb of Schwechat during the Vienna offensive, April 1945

The corps was formed in 1942. With the 21st Tank Corps, it was earmarked for the Soviet offensive that became the Second Battle of Kharkiv.

At the end of May 1942, during the battle and after large numbers of Soviet troops had been encircled, near the village of Lozovenka, Barvinkove Raion(?), the brigade took part in the breakthrough from the Barvenkovo pocket as part of the combined tank group of Major General Kuzmin, which consisted of the remnants of 5th Guards, 7th, 37th, 38th, and 43rd tank brigades, as well as the remnants of the 21st and 23rd Tank Corps. The breakthrough was accompanied by very heavy losses for the Soviet troops.

In the summer of 1945, the corps was transformed into a tank division, the 23rd Tank Division. Attached to the 52nd Army, it was garrisoned at Ovruch, in the Carpathian Military District. In 1946, the 52nd Army became the 8th Tank Army. It was renamed 6065th Base on July 1, 1990.

== Commanders ==
- Generál-mayór Yefim Pushkin (12 April–4 June 1942)
- Polkóvnik Abram Khasin (4 June–30 August 1942, major general 21 July 1942)
- Generál-mayór Aleksey Popov (30 August–16 October 1942)
- Polkóvnik Vasily Koshelev (16 October–29 November 1942)
- Generál-mayór Yefim Pushkin (29 November 1942–11 March 1944, General-leytenant 18 January 1943)
- Generál-mayór Aleksey Akhmanov (12 March 1944–June 1947, General-leytenant 13 September 1944)
- General-mayor Ivan Ivanovich Yushchuk (June 1947–December 1948)
- Polkovnik Nikolay Pavlovich Konstantinov (December 1948–April 1954)
- General-mayor Ivan Sergeyevich Ivanov (May 1954–October 1956)
- Polkovnik Valentin Fyodorovich Kulabukhov (October 1956–October 1959)
- General-mayor Georgy Grigoryevich Preysman (1970–12 September 1973)

== Bibliography ==
- Glantz, David M. (1998). Kharkov 1942: Anatomy of a Military Disaster. New York City: Sarpedon. ISBN 1-885119-54-2.
- Feskov, V.I.; Golikov, V.I.; Kalashnikov, K.A.; Slugin, S.A. (2013). Вооруженные силы СССР после Второй Мировой войны: от Красной Армии к Советской (часть 1: Сухопутные войска) [The Armed Forces of the USSR after World War II, from the Red Army to the Soviet (Part 1: Land Forces)] (in Russian). Tomsk: Scientific and Technical Literature Publishing.
- Holm, Michael http://www.ww2.dk/new/army/td/23td.htm - sketch divisional history for 23rd Tank Division after 1945, drawing on V.I. Feskov et al 2013.
- Combat Journal 18 March to 17 April 1944
