= 1st Panzer Army =

Military unit of Nazi Germany

- 1. Panzerarmee
- Insignia
- Active: 16 November 1940 – 8 May 1945
- Country: Nazi Germany
- Branch: Army (Wehrmacht)
- Type: Panzer
- Role: Armoured warfare
- Size: Army; 1 July 1942 (start of Case Blue): 226,688; 1 November 1943 (Battle of the Dnieper): 282,175; 1 March 1944 (Dnieper-Carpathian Offensive): 211,545; 1 May 1944 (after the battle of the Kamenets-Podolsky pocket); 172,541
- Engagements: World War II; Battle of France; Yugoslavia; Operation Barbarossa; Brody/Dubno; Battle of Uman; Battle of Kiev (1941); Battle of Rostov (1941); 2nd Kharkov; Case Blue; Battle of Rostov (1942); Battle of the Caucasus; 3rd Kharkov; Donbas strategic offensive (July 1943); Izyum-Barvenkovo offensive; Donbas strategic offensive (August 1943); Battle of the Dnieper; Dnieper-Carpathian offensive; Zhitomir-Berdichev offensive; Korsun-Cherkassy pocket; Kamenets-Podolsky pocket; Lvov-Sandomierz offensive; Western Carpathian offensive; Moravia–Ostrava offensive

Commanders
- Notable commanders: Ewald von Kleist

The 1st Panzer Army (German: 1. Panzerarmee) was a German tank army that was a large armoured formation of the Wehrmacht during World War II.

When originally formed on 1 March 1940, the predecessor of the 1st Panzer Army was named Panzer Group Kleist (Panzergruppe Kleist) with Colonel General Ewald von Kleist in command.

== Service history ==
Panzer Group Kleist was the first operational formation of several Panzer corps in the Wehrmacht. Created for the Battle of France on 1 March 1940; it was named after its commander Ewald von Kleist. Panzer Group Kleist played an important role in the Battle of Belgium. Panzer corps of the Group broke through the Ardennes and reached the sea, forming a huge pocket, containing several Belgian, British, and French armies. When the armistice was signed, the Group was deployed in occupied France, being renamed to Panzer Group 1 (Panzergruppe 1) in November. In April 1941, Panzer Group 1 took part in the Balkans campaign (invasion of Yugoslavia and Greece) as part of Field Marshal Maximilian von Weichs's Second Army.

=== 1941 ===
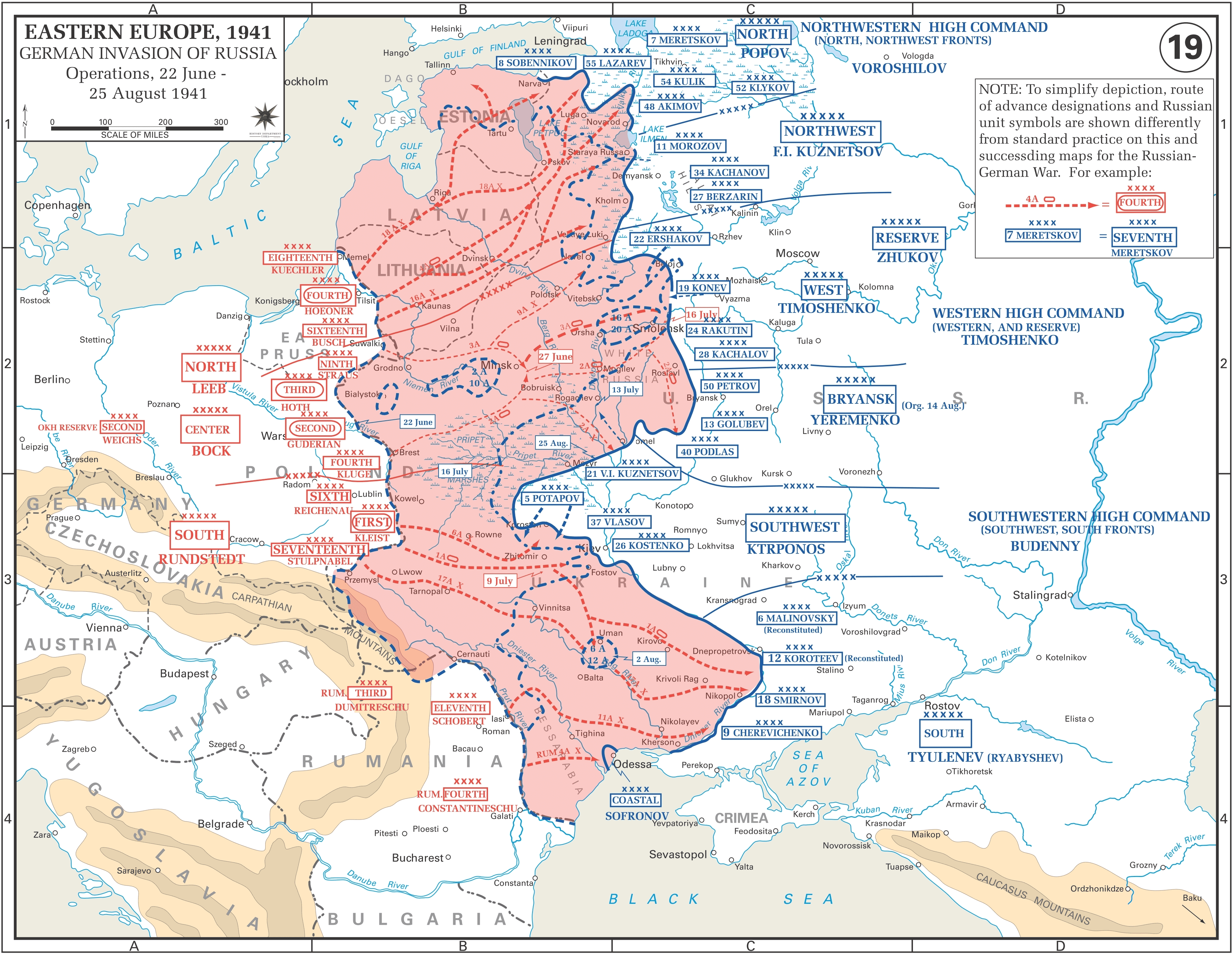
Position of Panzergruppe 1 Kleist at the opening phase of Operation Barbarossa

In May 1941 Panzer Group 1 was attached to Field Marshal Gerd von Rundstedt's Army Group South at the beginning of Operation Barbarossa. At the start of Operation Barbarossa in June 1941, Panzer Group 1 included the III, XIV and XLVIII Army Corps (motorized) with five panzer divisions and four motorized divisions (two of them SS) equipped with 799 tanks. Panzer Group 1 served on the southern sector of the Eastern Front against the Red Army and was involved the Battle of Brody which involved as many as 3,000 Red Army tanks. The units of the Group closed the encirclement around the Soviet armies near Uman and near Kiev. After the fall of Kiev Panzer Group 1 was enlarged to become the 1st Panzer Army (on October 6, 1941) with Kleist still in command. The army captured Rostov, but was forced to retreat eight days later.

=== 1942 ===
In January 1942, Army Group Kleist, which consisted of the First Panzer Army along with the Seventeenth Army, was formed with its namesake, Kleist, in command. Army Group Kleist played a major role in repulsing the Red Army attack in the Second Battle of Kharkov in May 1942. Army Group Kleist was disbanded that month. The First Panzer Army, still under Kleist, which had been attached to Army Group South earlier, became part of Army Group A under Field Marshal Wilhelm List. Army Group A was to lead the thrust into the Caucasus during Operation Blue and capture Grozny and the Baku (current capital of Azerbaijan) oilfields. The First Panzer Army was to spearhead the attack. Rostov, Maykop, Krasnodar and the Kuban region were captured.

In September 1942, the offensive by Army Group A stalled in the Caucasus and List was sacked. After Adolf Hitler briefly took personal control of Army Group A, he appointed Kleist to the command on 22 November 1942. As Kleist took over, Colonel-General Eberhard von Mackensen took the reins of the First Panzer Army. In December 1942, as the German 6th Army was being crushed in the Battle of Stalingrad, the Red Army launched an offensive against Army Group A. The First Panzer Army was ordered to retreat through Rostov in January 1943, before the Soviet forces could cut it off in the Kuban. By February 1943, the army had been withdrawn west of the Don River and Kleist withdrew the remains of his forces from Caucasus into the Kuban, east of the Strait of Kerch.

=== 1943 ===
In January 1943, von Mackensen's First Panzer Army became attached to Army Group Don under Field Marshal Erich von Manstein. In February, von Manstein redeployed the First Panzer Army together with the Fourth Panzer Army to counter-attack the Soviet breakthrough from the Battle of Stalingrad. The First Panzer Army contributed to the success of the Third Battle of Kharkov in March 1943. In July 1943, the Army, with the help of the XXIV Panzer Corps, repelled the Soviet Izyum-Barvenkovo Offensive. In October 1943 Soviet forces crossed the Dnieper River between Dnipropetrovsk and Kremenchug. The First Panzer Army counter-attacked along with the 8th Army, but failed to dislodge the Soviet forces. At the end of March, as the Red Army closed in on Kiev, von Mackensen was replaced by Colonel-General Hans-Valentin Hube.

=== 1944 ===
The First Panzer Army remained attached to Army Group South from March 1943 to July 1944. By that time Wehrmacht troops had been pulled out from Ukraine. In March 1944, crisis hit the First Panzer Army as it was encircled by two Soviet fronts in the Battle of Kamenets-Podolsky pocket. A successful breakthrough was made, saving most of the manpower but losing the heavy equipment. That same month Hitler, who insisted his armies fight an inflexible defense to the last man, dismissed von Manstein. In October 1941, when the First Panzer Army had been formed, it was a large army consisting of four corps, several infantry, panzer, motorized, mountain, and SS divisions, along with a Romanian army and some Italian, Romanian, Hungarian, and Slovak divisions. By the spring of 1944, the First Panzer Army had shrunk considerably, consisting of only three corps, two infantry, four panzer, and one SS division. After July 1944 it retreated from Ukraine and Poland before fighting with Army Group A in Slovakia (Battle of the Dukla Pass).

=== 1945 ===
During its existence, from October 1941 to May 1945, the First Panzer Army spent its entire time on the Eastern Front. In the spring of 1945, the First Panzer Army's main task was to defend the Ostrava region in the north of Moravia, which was at the time the last large industrial area in the hands of Third Reich. There the First Panzer Army was facing the advance of 4th Ukrainian Front from the north-east (Ostrava-Opava Operation, 10 March – 5 May 1945) and had lost most of its heavy and medium tanks. At the same time the Panzer Army was flanked by the 2nd Ukrainian Front from the south (Bratislava-Brno Operation, 25 March – 5 May 1945). German defensive lines finally collapsed in the early hours of Prague Offensive. The staff of First Panzer Army, along with other commands subordinated to Army Group Center, surrendered to the Soviet forces on 9 May 1945 in the area of Deutsch-Brod, while the remnants of its Panzer-units were scattered and captured all the way from Olomouc to Vysočina Region. Its last commander general Walther Nehring abandoned his staff and fled south to surrender to US Army forces.

== Commanders ==
| No. | Portrait | Commander | Took office | Left office | Time in office |
|---|---|---|---|---|---|
| 1 | Ewald von Kleist | Generaloberst; Ewald von Kleist (1881–1954) | 1 March 1940 | 21 November 1942 | 2 years, 265 days |
| 2 | Eberhard von Mackensen | Generaloberst; Eberhard von Mackensen (1889–1969) | 21 November 1942 | 29 October 1943 | 342 days |
| 3 | Hans-Valentin Hube | Generaloberst; Hans-Valentin Hube (1890–1944) | 29 October 1943 | 21 April 1944 † | 175 days |
| 4 | Erhard Raus | Generaloberst; Erhard Raus (1889–1956) | 21 April 1944 | 15 August 1944 | 116 days |
| 5 | Gotthard Heinrici | Generaloberst; Gotthard Heinrici (1886–1971) | 15 August 1944 | 19 March 1945 | 216 days |
| 6 | Walter Nehring | General der Panzertruppe; Walter Nehring (1892–1983) | 19 March 1945 | 8 May 1945 | 50 days |

== Chiefs of the general staff ==
- Generalmajor Kurt Zeitzler (creation – 24 April 1942)
- Generalmajor Ernst-Felix Fäckenstedt (24 April 1942 – 15 March 1943)
- Generalmajor Walther Wenck (15 March 1943 – 15 March 1944)
- Generalmajor Carl Wagener (15 March 1944 – 5 November 1944)

== See also ==
- Battle of Uman
- Kamenets-Podolsky pocket
