= Barvinkove Raion =

Former subdivision of Kharkiv Oblast, Ukraine

Barvinkove Raion Барвінківський район
- Raion
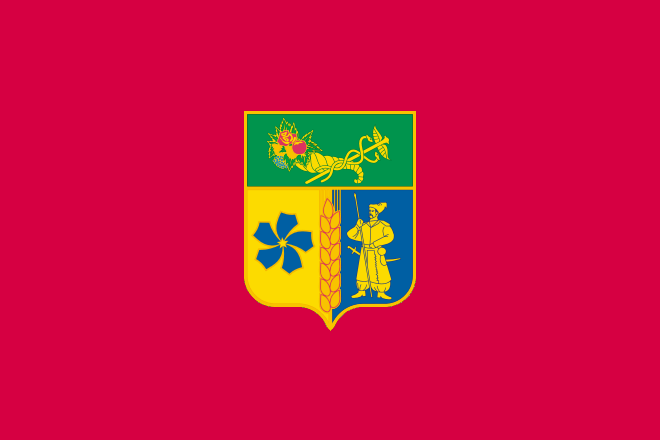
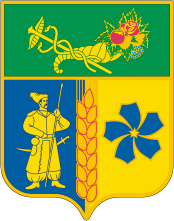
- Flag Coat of arms

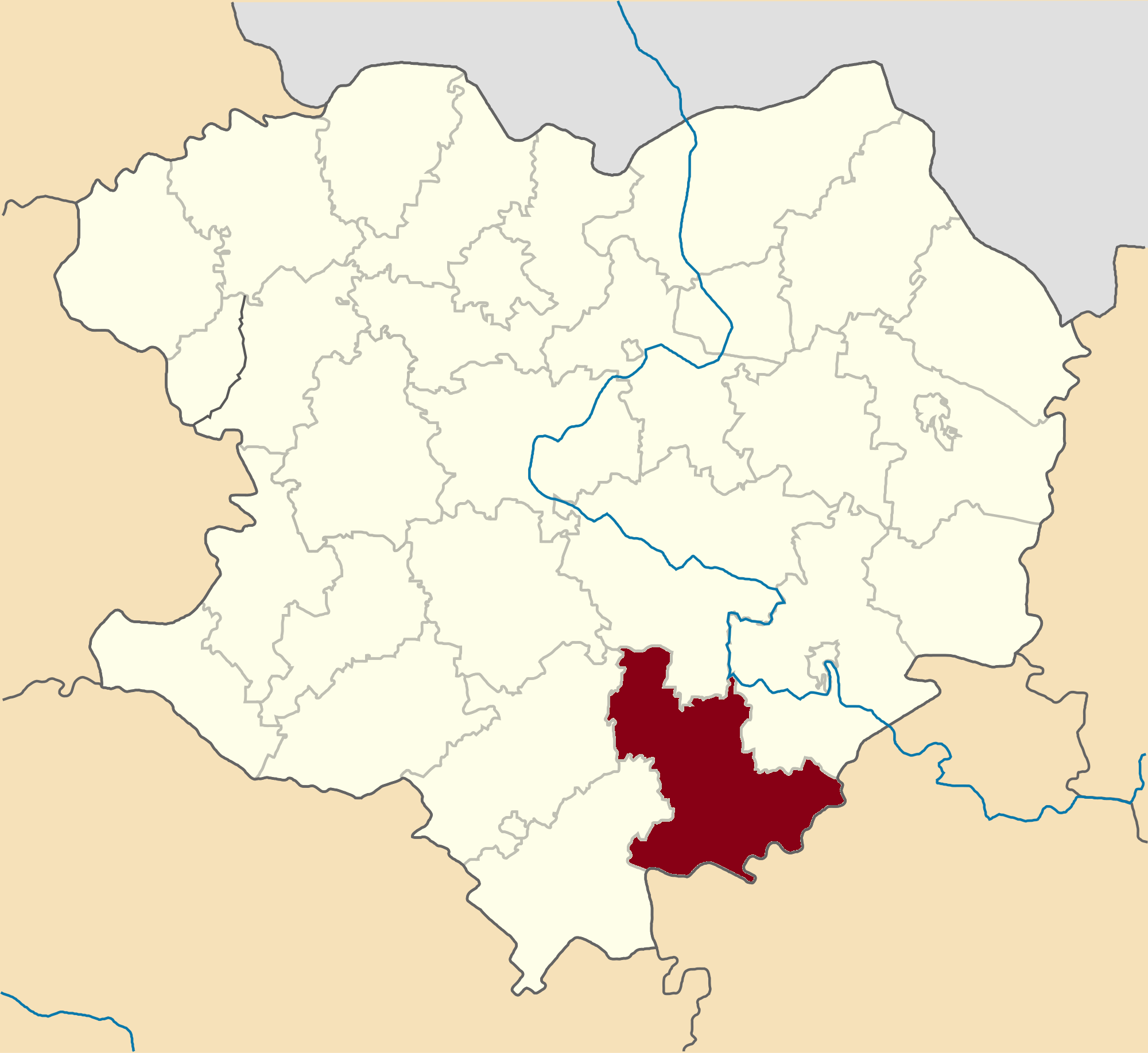
- Raion location in Kharkiv Oblast
- Coordinates: 48°59′2.1768″N 36°55′0.2418″E
- Country: Ukraine
- Oblast: Kharkiv Oblast
- Disestablished: 18 July 2020
- Admin. center: Barvinkove

Area
  - Total: 1,364.5 km^{2} (526.8 sq mi)

Population (2020)
  - Total: 20,087
  - Density: 14.721/km^{2} (38.128/sq mi)
- Time zone: UTC+2 (EET)
  - Summer (DST): UTC+3 (EEST)
- Website: barvinkove-rda.gov.ua

Barvinkove Raion (Ukrainian: Барвінківський район) was a raion (district) in Kharkiv Oblast of Ukraine. Its administrative center was the city of Barvinkove. The raion was abolished on 18 July 2020 as part of the administrative reform of Ukraine, which reduced the number of raions of Kharkiv Oblast to seven. The area of Barvinkove Raion was merged into Izium Raion. The last estimate of the raion population was 20,087 (2020 est.)

At the time of disestablishment, the raion consisted of one hromada, Barvinkove urban hromada with the administration in Barvinkove.
