= 45th Rifle Division =

- Active: 1919–1932; 1935–1943 (1st Formation); 1943–1957 (2nd Formation); 1957–1997 (as 131st MRD)
- Country: Soviet Union
- Branch: Soviet Army
- Type: Infantry
- Size: Division
- Engagements: Russian Civil War Polish-Soviet War; Soviet invasion of Poland World War II: Battle of Stalingrad; Petsamo–Kirkenes Offensive
- Decorations: Order of Lenin (First formation); Order of the Red Banner (First formation)
- Honorifics: Volyn (First formation); Pechenga (Second formation)

Commanders
- Notable commanders: Iona Yakir; Vasily Sokolov

The 45th Rifle Division was a Red Army infantry division formed originally during the Russian Civil War that fought in World War II and then served through the Cold War in the Leningrad Military District.

The division was originally formed 16 June 1919 in the Odessa raion from the 5th Ukrainian Rifle Division.

== Civil War service ==
The 45th Rifle Division was formed from the 5th Ukrainian Rifle Division around Odessa. In August 1919, during the Odessa Operation (1919), it was cut off and retreated between the White armies and the Ukrainian People's Army to reach Bolshevik-held territory near Korosten.

== Second World War service ==
=== First Formation ===
It was attached to the Kiev Special Military District/Soviet Southwestern Front at the outbreak of World War II, as part of the 15th Rifle Corps, 5th Army. Under Colonel V.P. Solokov, it was earmarked to defend the mid-Volga River islands behind the hard-pressed 62nd Army on 7 October 1942. However it was deployed in the Battle of Stalingrad proper on 26 October 1942, being ferried over from the east to the west bank of the Volga River to take up positions between the Red October and the Barrikady factories.

On 1 January 1943 the division was re-designated the 74th Guards Rifle Division.

=== Second formation ===
The division was re-formed on 5 May 1943 in the Kareliya territory from the 67th Naval Rifle Brigade of the Karelian Front, on defensive boundaries at Loukhi Stations of the Kirov railway. After its formation the division was concentrated towards Kestenga (Kiestinki), and from 6 May until 19 August 1943 was retained in the reserve of the 31st Rifle Corps in defensive positions. The division's first combat was on 9 August 1943 with the 61st Rifle Regiment and 85th Naval Rifle Brigade were supported by the 178th Artillery Regiment. On 20 August 1943 the division replaced the 85th Motor Rifle Brigade and 205th Rifle Division in the first echelon, and on 7 September 1943 conducted defensive operations against the Nazi 7th Infantry Division and 6th SS Mountain Division Nord. On 8 September 1944 the division had gone over to the offensive and on 10 September seized the Kestenga settlement. It was later relocated in the Kandalaksha direction to the area of Nyamozero Station. From 24 September till 28 September 1944, the 45th Rifle Division attacked the settlement of Alakurtti.

By 3 October 1944 the division had been relocated in the Murmansk direction and was a part of the army operations group, having the task to attack an auxiliary direction as part of the 14th Army. On 10 October 1944, 45th Rifle Division had broken through defense of its opponent on the Zapadnaya Litsa River near the Lake Chapr area. On 13 October 1944 the division joined 131st Rifle Corps (probably part of 14th Army) and on October 15 in cooperation with elements of 131st Rifle Corps seized Petsamo (as part of the Petsamo-Kirkenes Operation).

From 16 October until 25 October 1944 it conducted operations for seizing the village of Tornet and the Norwegian city of Kirkenes. On 25 October 1944 the 61st Rifle Regiment and the 253rd Rifle Regiment of the division helped seize the port and city of Kirkenes. On 1 November 1944 it was part of 131st Rifle Corps (with 14th and 368th Rifle Divisions) as part of 14th Army, Karelian Front.

For actions on clearing Pechenga (Petsamo) the divisional staff was thanked officially by the Supreme Commander in Chief Joseph Stalin, and the division was given the honourable name "Pechenga". For taking Kirkenes, the staffs of the 61st Rifle Regiment and 253rd Rifle Regiment were given the honorary name "Kirkenes". On 6 January 1945 for valour and courage in combat with fascist aggressors the 61st Rifle Regiment of the division was awarded the Military Order of the Red Banner. On 27 September 1945 parts of the division, following a decision of the Soviet government were withdrawn from Norway and billeted in Murmansk and the Pechenga area.

== Cold War service ==
In 1957 the division was renamed the 131st Pechenga Motor-Rifle Division. In 1968, in days of celebrating the 25 anniversary of its second formation, the division was awarded the Order of Kutuzov, 2nd class.

== Russian Federation service ==
On 1 December 1997 the 131st MRD was reorganised as the 200th Pechenga Independent Motor-Rifle Brigade. The division, as the 200th Brigade, has been based for many years at Pechenga in Murmansk Oblast. However, Michael Holm lists the reorganisation date as June 1997.

== Sources ==
- Machine translated from Russian official site
- V.I. Feskov et al. 2004, Lenskii et al.
- (200th Pechenga Independent Motor Rifle Brigade, Pechenga, Murmansk Oblast)
- http://bbs.keyhole.com/ubb/showflat.php/Cat/0/Number/954462/Main/954462 – Google Earth link
