= Barvinkove =

City in Kharkiv Oblast, Ukraine

Barvinkove Барвінкове
- City
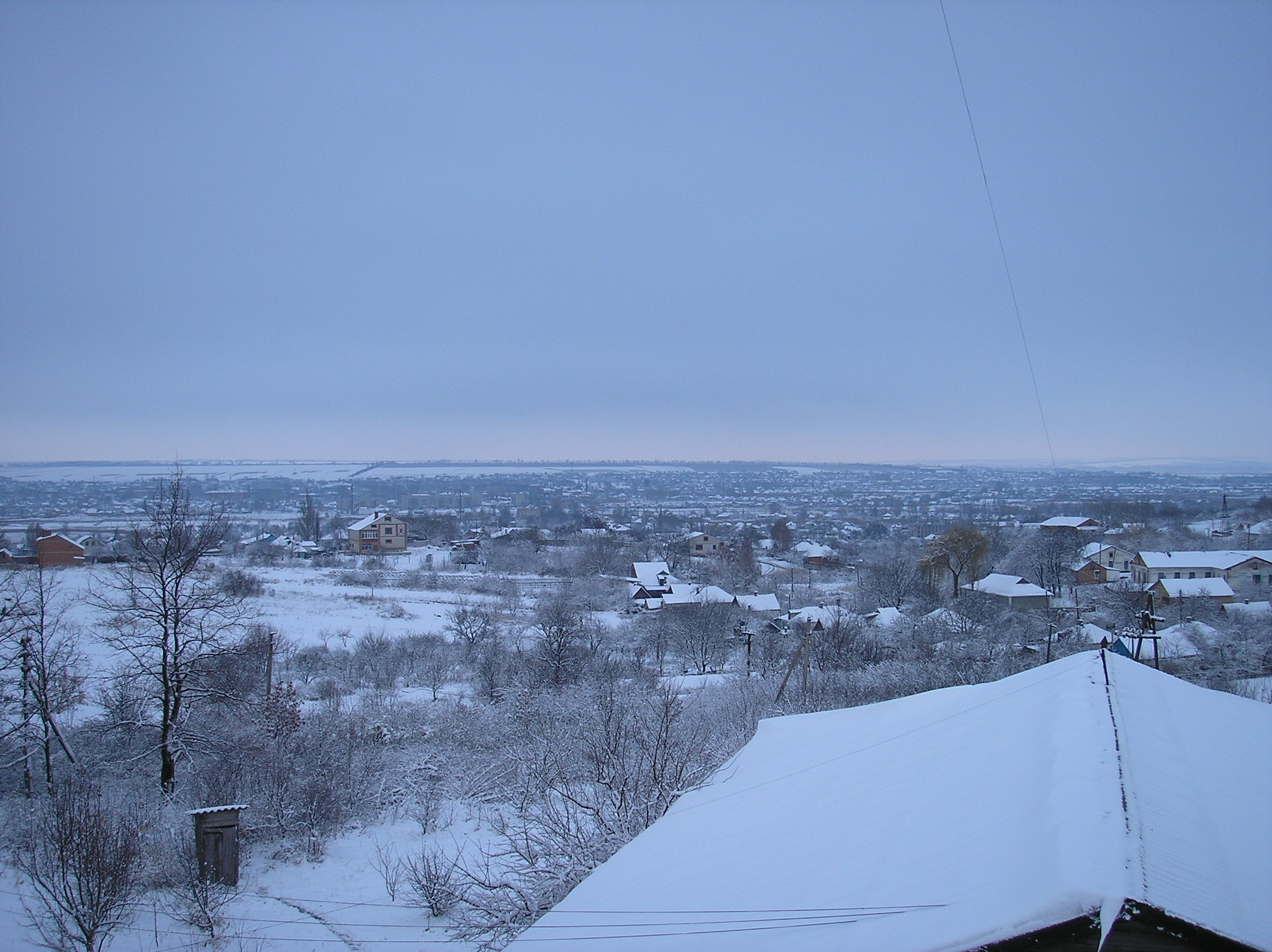
- Skyline of Barvinkove in Winter

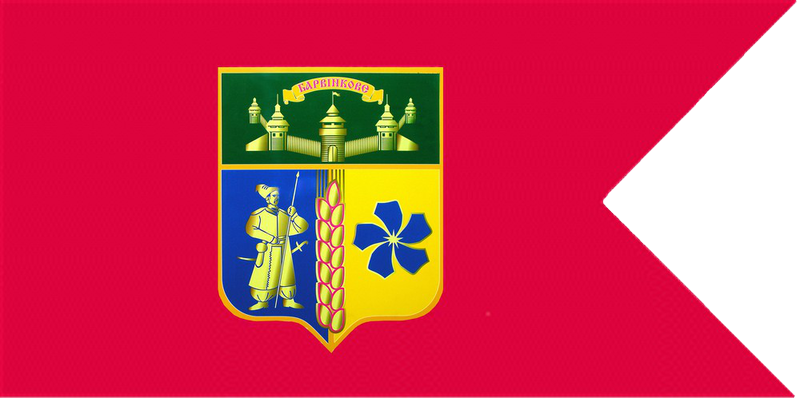
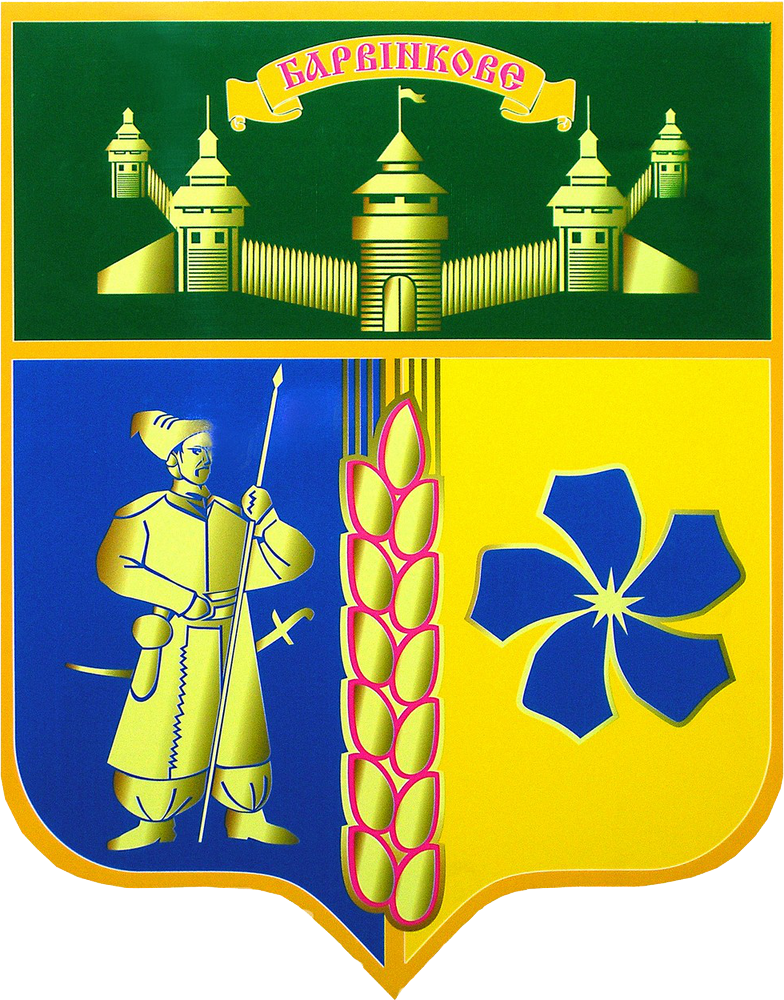
- Flag Coat of arms
- Interactive map of Barvinkove
- Location within Kharkiv Oblast Location within Ukraine
- Coordinates: 48°54′N 37°01′E
- Country: Ukraine
- Oblast: Kharkiv Oblast
- Raion: Izium Raion
- Hromada: Barvinkove urban hromada
- First mentioned: 1653

Population (2022)
  - Total: 7,840
- Time zone: UTC+2 (EET)
  - Summer (DST): UTC+3 (EEST)

Barvinkove (Ukrainian: Барвінкове, IPA: [bɐrˈwʲinkowe]; Russian: Барвинково, romanized: Barvinkovo) is a city in Izium Raion, Kharkiv Oblast, Ukraine. It hosts the administration of Barvinkove urban hromada, one of the communities of Ukraine. Population: 7,840 (2022 estimate).

== History ==
The settlement, then called Barvinkova Stinka, dates to 1653.

At the beginning of its existence, Barvinkove was a wintering place (zymivnyk), receiving the status of a sloboda in the 18th century. The Cossacks built a wooden fortress on Chumatska Hill, from which they could see all the approaches to the town. In 1680 and 1690, the city suffered a plague epidemic.

In 1708, Tsar Peter the Great visited the city, trying to persuade the people of Barvinok not to fight against him, but despite this, the local Cossacks supported Mazepa and fought for independence.

In the times of the Nova Sich, Barvinokova Stinka was the administrative center of the Barvinkove Palanka. The last colonel, Ivan Garadzha, poured lard over the skin of more than one Sloboda lord, which Kharkiv Governor Shcherbynin complained about to Potemkin. Thus, in 1774, after the participation of Barvinkove residents in the Cossack uprising of Omelian Pugachev, Garadzha disarmed the punishers, and dipped their commander, Colonel Dolgorukyi, in a barrel of tar, rolled him in feathers, put him backwards on a stool, and sent him to the Izium regiment in this form. I. Garadzha also destroyed the settlements of the Sloboda Cossacks Grushuvakha and Velyka Kamyshevakha, which were built on the land of the Zaporizhzhia army without permission.

Despite the decree of Catherine II on the eternal freedom of the Cossacks of Barvinkivska Stina, which did not exist, after the liquidation of the Zaporizhzhia Sich in 1775, a significant part of the residents of Barvinkove moved to the Kuban, where they founded their own village. The resettlement was led by a descendant of Ivan Barvinok's family. And after Catherine II visited the Cossack church in 1787 on her way from the Crimea, where women were forbidden to enter, they burned their shrine because the whore Katka had desecrated it. The Barvinkova Stinka settlement received the status of a military settlement and until 1924, instead of streets, it had hundreds of settlements, of which there were 12, and was part of the Izium Hussars (Dragoons) Regiment. In honor of their heroism, the Church of the Assumption of the Blessed Virgin Mary, a "church on blood," was built in 1884.

Barvinkove turned into a trading volost town, where six fairs are held annually.

During the Russian-Ukrainian War of 1917-1922 (the Soviet Union was founded in 1921), the Battle of Barvinkove took place. Barvinkove is one of the districts where Nestor Makhno's units operated.

Barvinkove suffered as a result of the genocide of the Ukrainian people carried out by the USSR government in 1932–1933, the number of victims was 489 people.

During the Second World War in 1941–1943, Barvinkove suffered extensive destruction, and the frontline passed through the town six times. The Izyum-Barvinkove Offensive was the second offensive operation of the Red Army. Of particular significance was the disaster of Soviet troops in the Kharkiv offensive in May 1942 in the so-called Barvinkivskyi cauldron.

In April 2019, a park near the monument to the Soviet soldiers-liberators of the 31st Guards Barvinkiv Tank Brigade was laid at the entrance to the city as part of the "Alley of Three Generations" campaign with the participation of schoolchildren, ATO and JFO participants, Afghan soldiers, and Chernobyl victims.

Until 18 July 2020, Barvinkove was the administrative center of Barvinkove Raion. The raion was abolished in July 2020 as part of the administrative reform of Ukraine, which reduced the number of raions of Kharkiv Oblast to seven. The area of Barvinkove Raion was merged into Izium Raion.

== Demographics ==
Ethnic makeup of the city as of 2001:

Ethnic groups in Barvinkove
	percent
Ukrainians	91.05%
Russians	7.02%
Roma	0.93%
Armenians	0.29%
Belarusians	0.23%

== Gallery ==
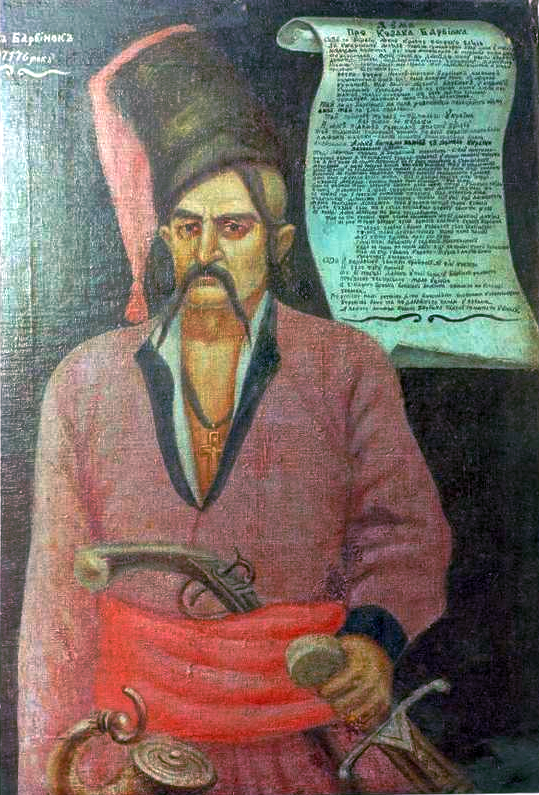
Ataman Ivan Barvinok, founder of Barvinkove

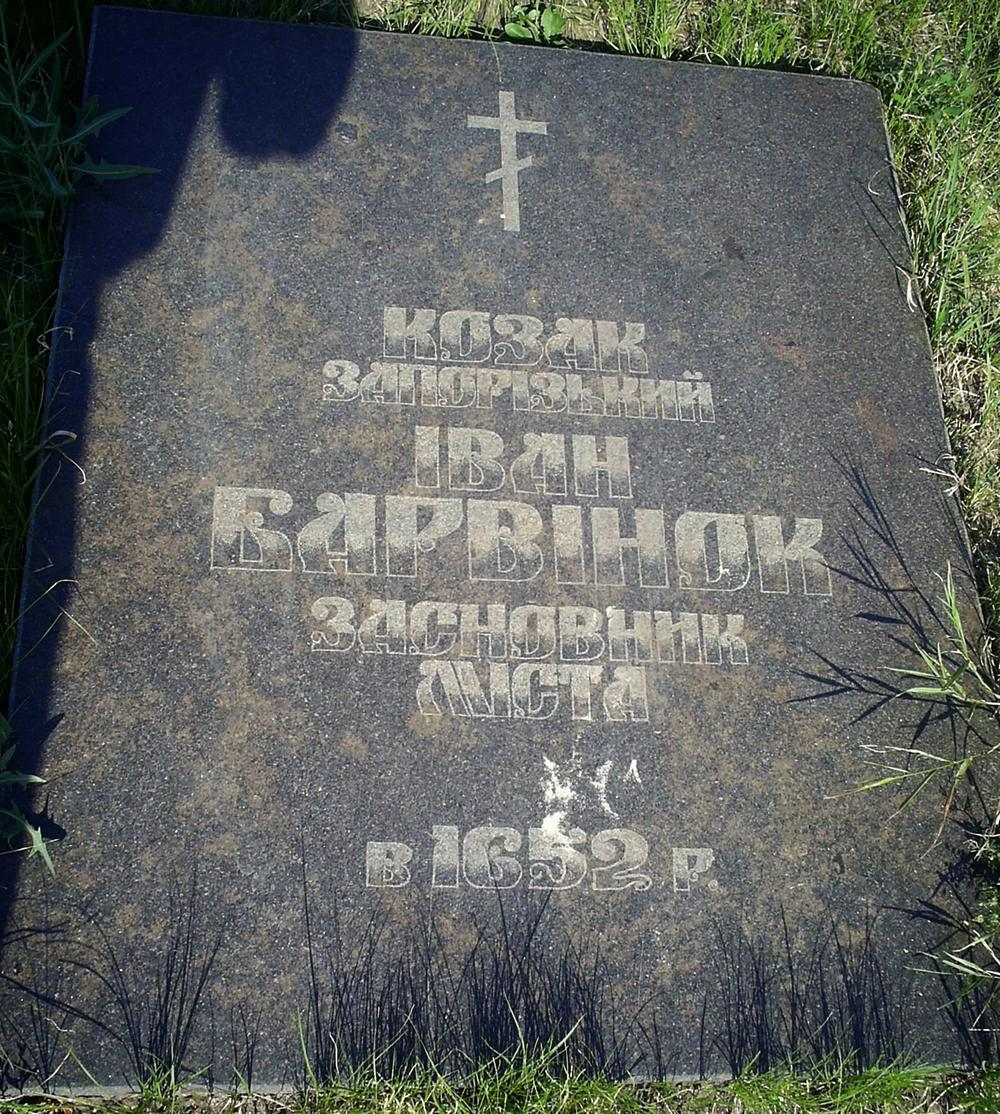
Memorial plaque to Ivan Barvinok

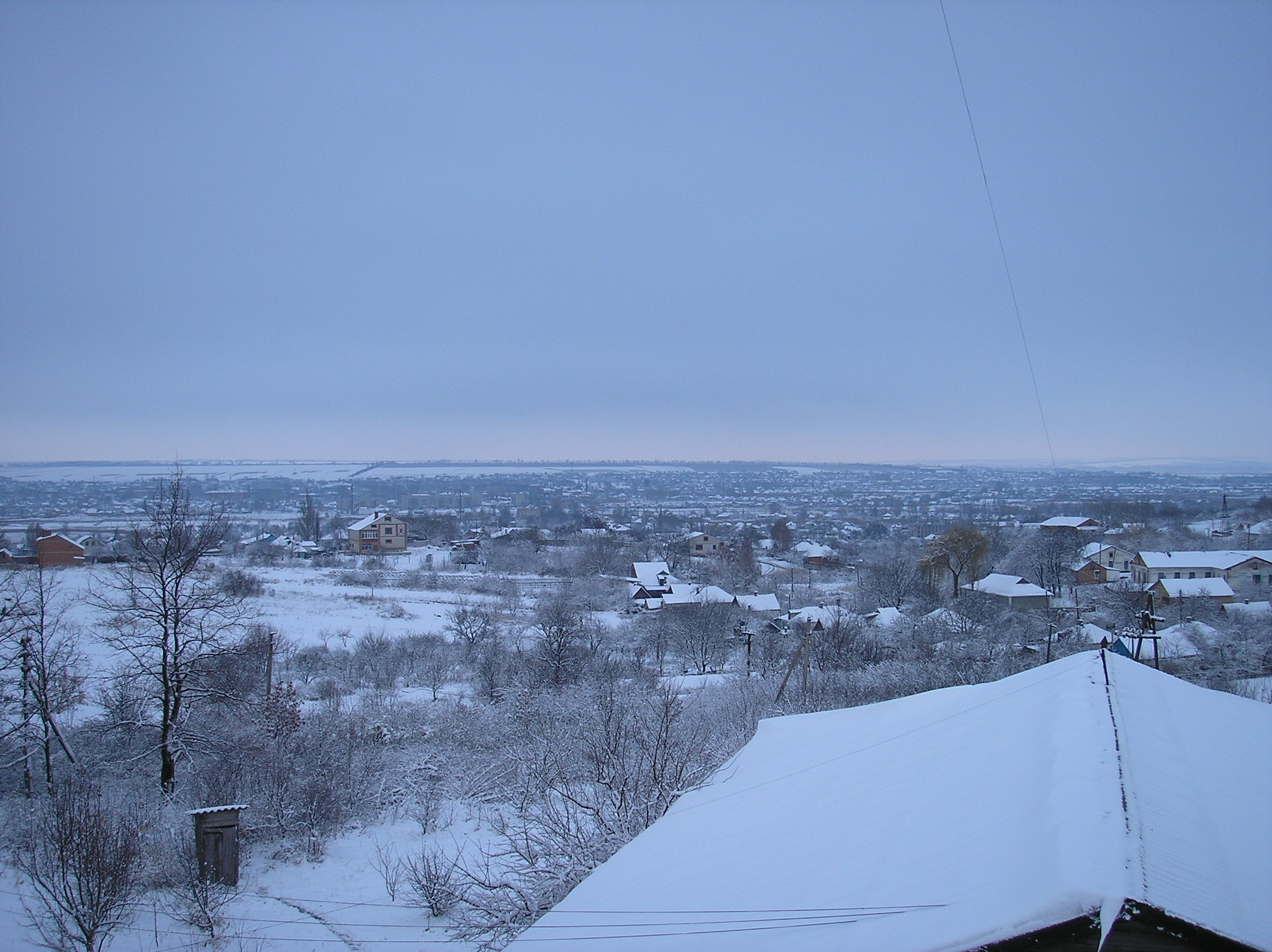
Winter in Barvinkove

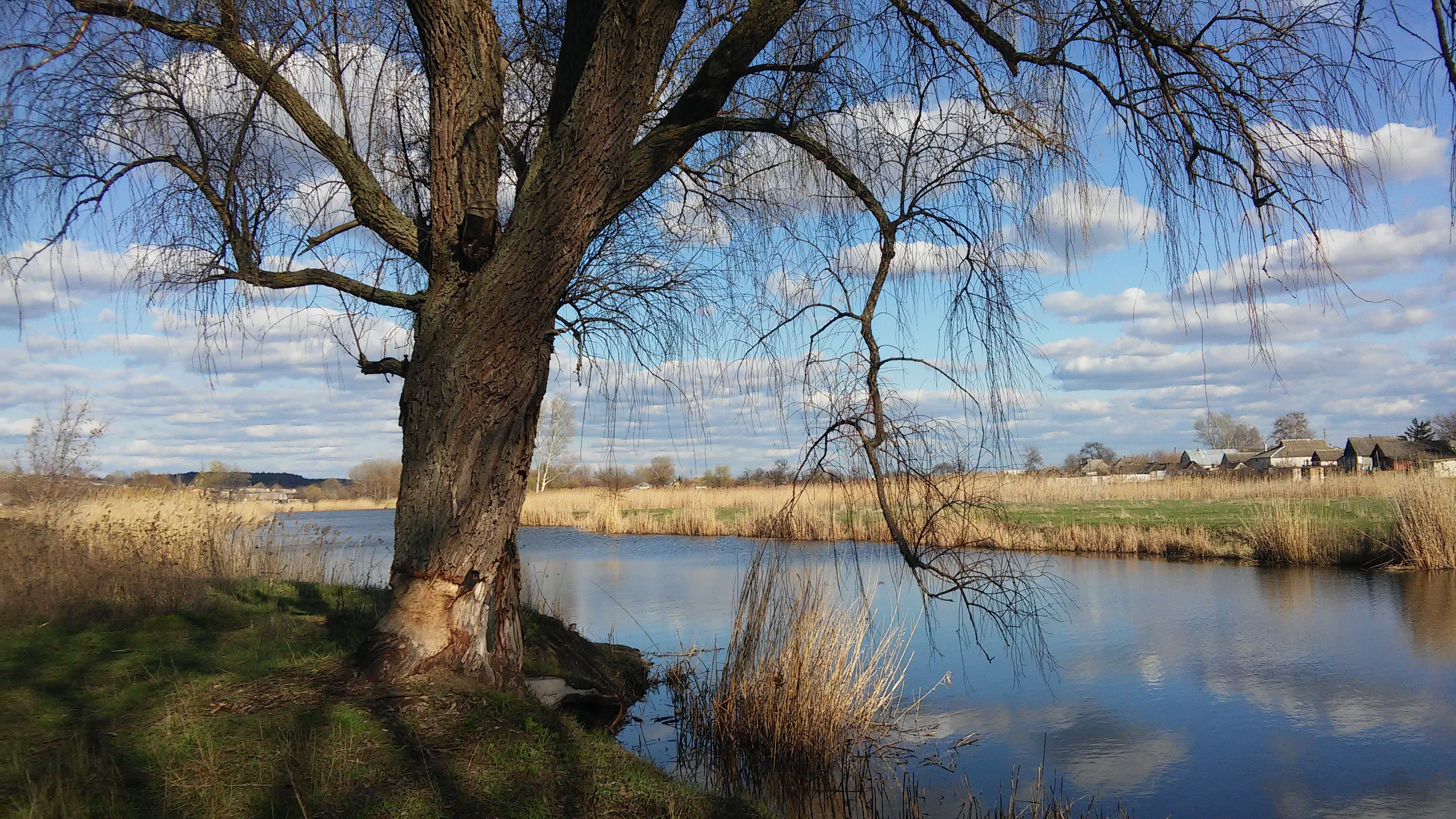
Sukhyi Torets River

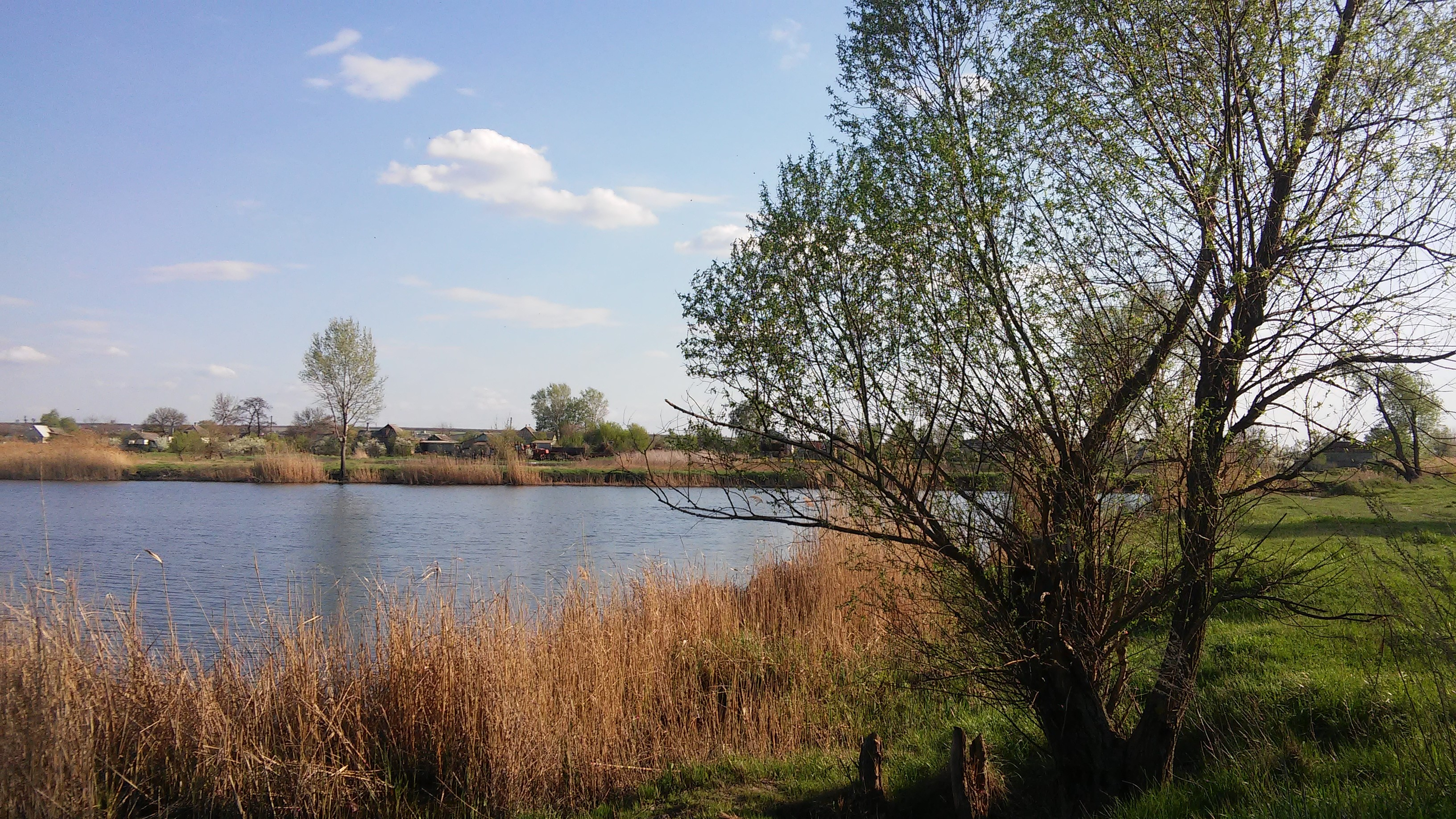
Sukhyi Torets River near the New Bridge

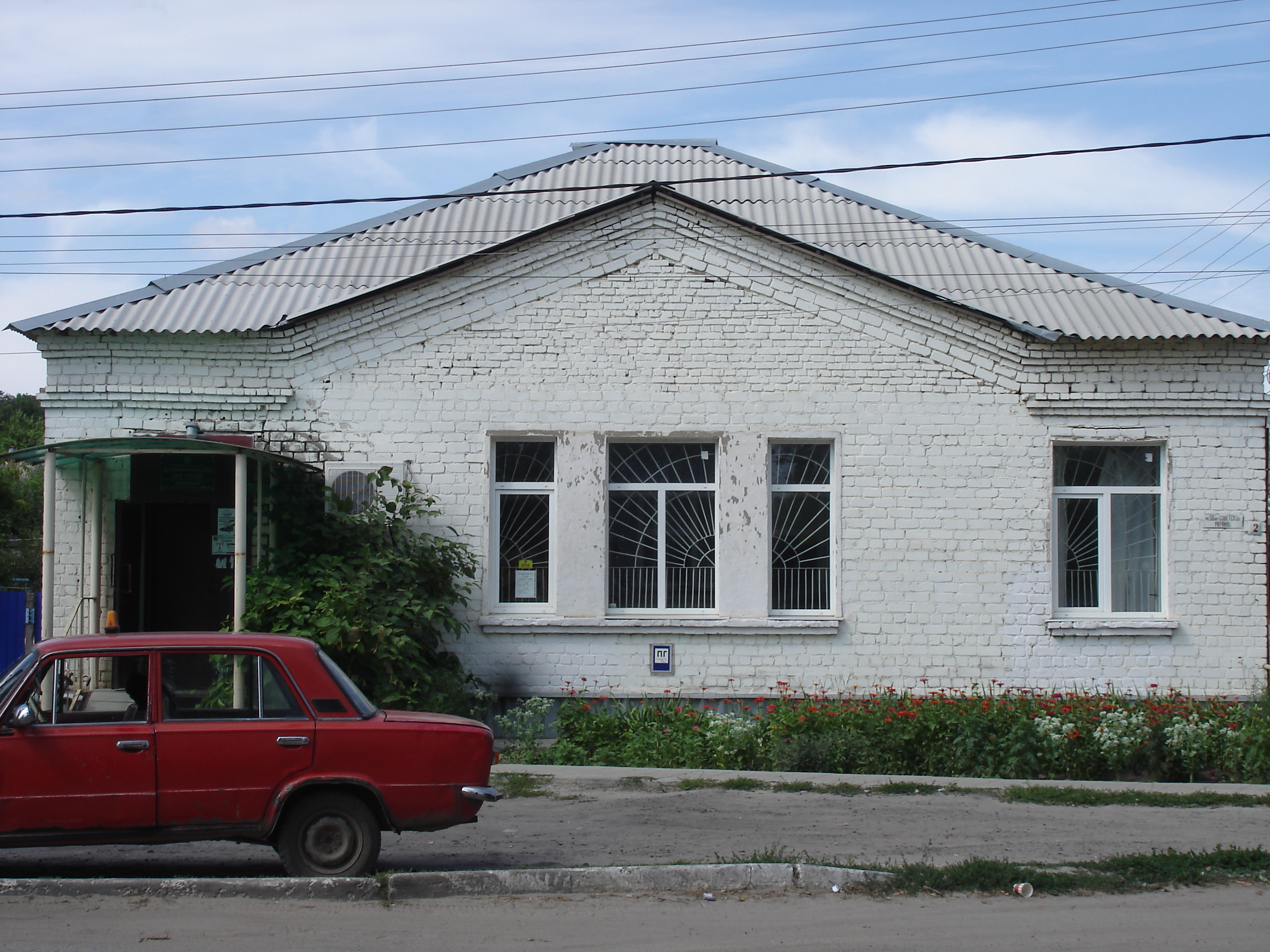
Osvyta street

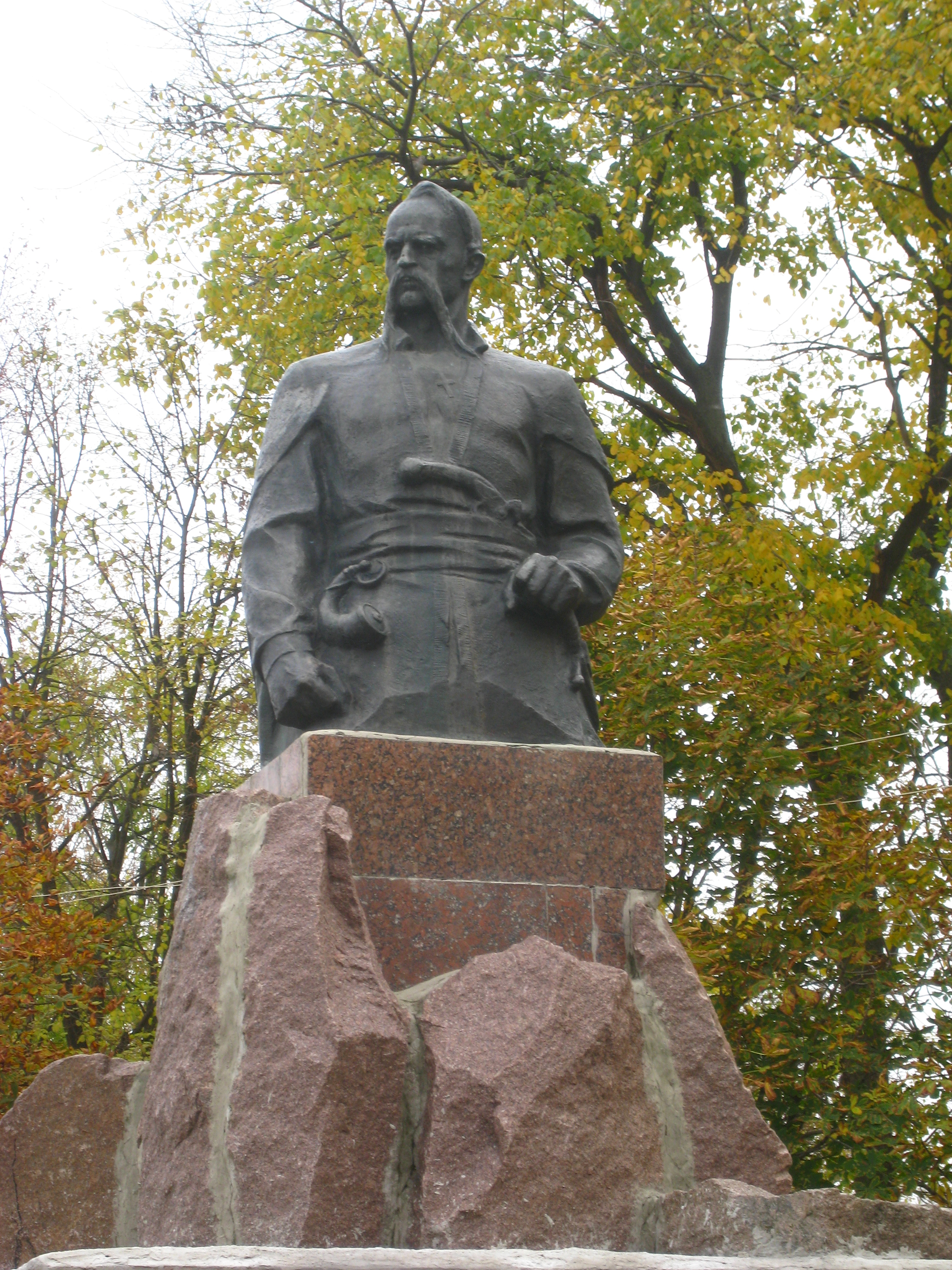
Monument to Cossack Ivan Barvinok

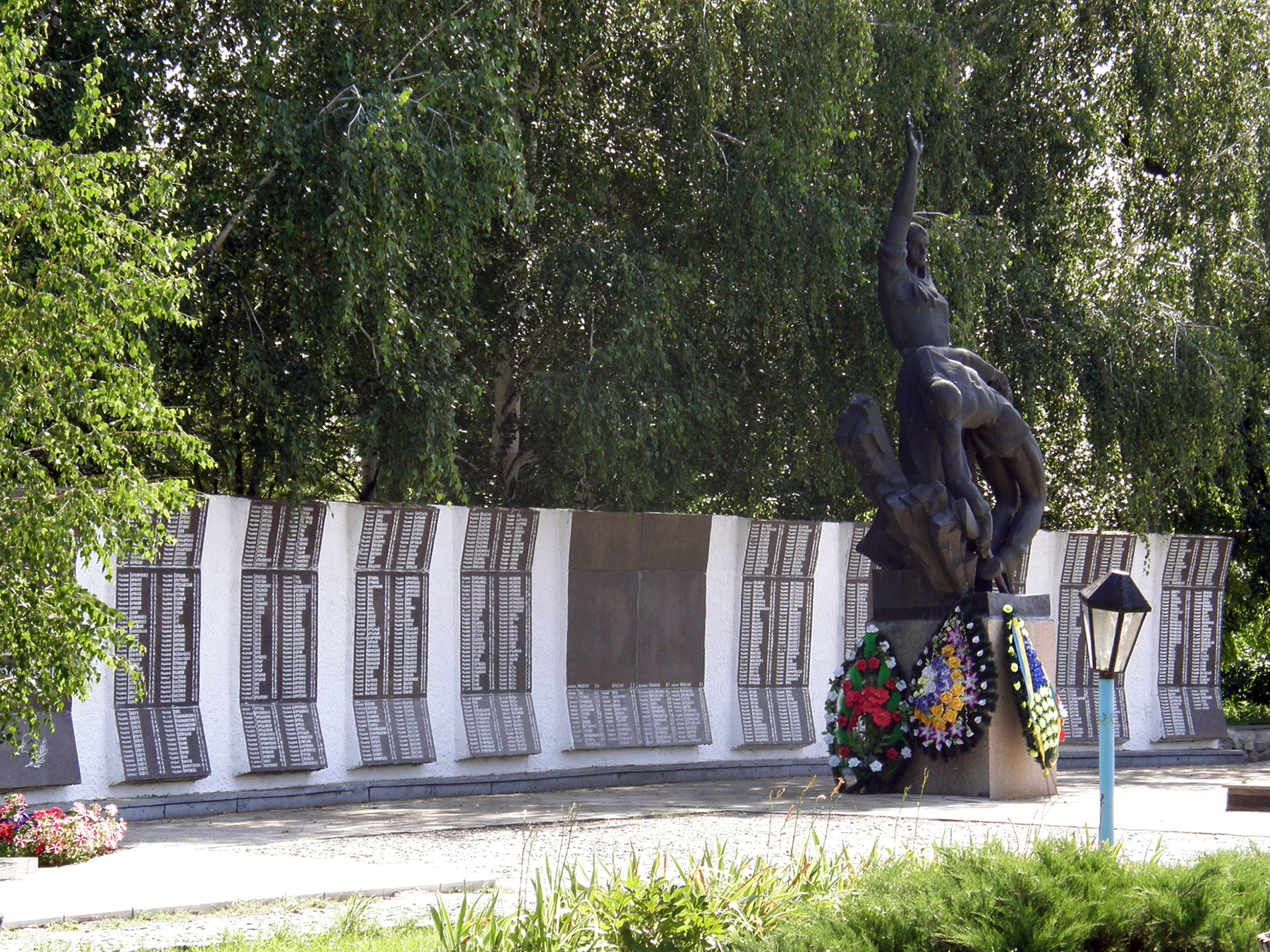
Memorial on the Central Square
