= Izyum–Barvenkovo offensive =

Battle on the Eastern Front of WW2

- Part of the Eastern Front of World War II
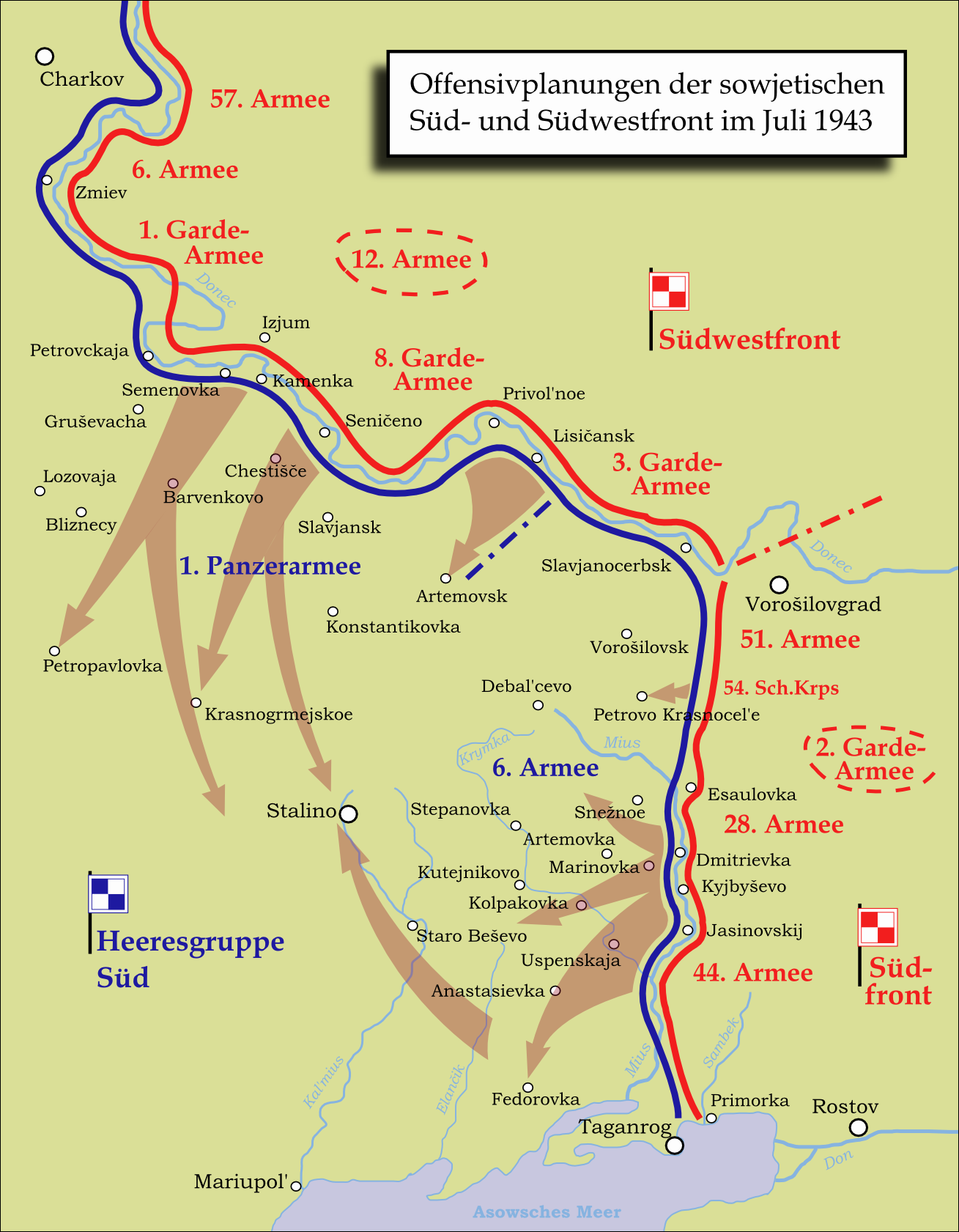
- Soviet plans for the summer offensive of 1943 on the southern flank of the Eastern Front (in German)
Date	17 July 1943 – 27 July 1943 (1 week and 3 days)
Location	Izium/Barvinkove area, Kharkiv Oblast, Ukrainian SSR, Soviet Union
Result	Axis victory

Belligerents
Germany	Soviet Union

Commanders and leaders
(Nazi Germany) Erich von Manstein (Nazi Germany) Eberhard von Mackensen	(Soviet Union) Rodion Malinovsky

Strength
About 250,000 men in the 1st Panzer Army	202,430 men 1,109 tanks and assault guns

Casualties and losses
4,877 killed or missing and 11,157 wounded in the 1st Panzer Army	10,310 killed or missing Total: 38,690

The Izyum–Barvenkovo offensive (17 July 1943 – 27 July 1943) was a Soviet offensive operation of the Southwestern Front against part of the German Army Group South during World War II. The aim of the operation was to tie down German reserves during the Battle of Kursk and overrun the German forces located in Donbas. Soviet troops managed to cross the Donets river and seize the bridgehead, but the German counterattacks stopped the further advance.

== Background ==
The Soviet command believed that German troops on the southern section of the Eastern Front were greatly weakened. There were no tank divisions left in the 1st Panzer Army in this sector (for example, in the XL Panzer Corps there were only three ordinary infantry divisions). Only one tank battalion remained in the reserve 17th Panzer Division. So, the South-Western Front was supposed to strike three Guards Armies (1st and 8th in the main direction and the 3rd in the auxiliary) and to break the German defenses. After that, the Soviet tank formations (23rd Tank Corps and 1st Guards Mechanized Corps) were to enter the breakthrough. In the Stalino region they were to connect with the troops of the Southern Front and, thus, encircle German troops in Donbass. Compensating for the lack of tanks, German troops relied on their fortifications created since March 1943. In addition, Soviet intelligence seriously underestimated the strength of opposed infantry divisions (especially their equipment with artillery and machine guns). The Southwestern Front did not have a numerical superiority over the 1st Panzer Army, but it included many experienced Guards units. Indeed, the 8th Guards Army (then 62nd Army) excelled during the defense of Stalingrad.

== Orders of battle ==
Two armies of the Soviet Southwestern Front (6th and 57th) were not involved in the operation. Also, 6th Army, 4th Panzer Army and Army Detachment Kempf of German Army Group South were not involved. The 23rd Panzer Division of XXIV Panzer Corps was sent towards Mius river.

Soviet forces

- Southwestern Front
  - 1st Guards Army
  - 3rd Guards Army
  - 8th Guards Army
  - 1st Guards Mechanised Corps
  - 23rd Tank Corps
  - 12th Army (in reserve)

Axis Forces

- Army Group South
  - 1st Panzer Army
    - XL Panzer Corps (46th, 257th and 333rd Infantry Divisions)
    - LVII Panzer Corps (15th, 198th and 328th Infantry Divisions)
    - XXX Army Corps (38th, 62nd and 387th Infantry Divisions)
  - XXIV Panzer Corps
    - SS Panzergrenadier Division Wiking
    - 17th Panzer Division

== Action ==
The Germans noticed Soviet preparations and on 14 July Hitler ordered the XXIV Panzer Corps from the reserve of Army Group South shifted back behind the 1st Panzer Army. The Soviet offensive began on July 17. The 1st and 8th Guards Armies managed to cross the Seversky Donets River, capture new bridgeheads on the right bank and advance to a depth up to 5 kilometers. However, the advance stopped there, because Soviet troops were unable to crack the defense system completely and so the tank units could not operate freely in a greater depth. The German command quickly used at first the reserves of the 1st Panzer Army and then the XXIV Panzer Corps. Attacks of the 3rd Guards Army in the auxiliary direction were completely unsuccessful.

In the following days there was a fierce head-on battle. The German units launched counterattacks, trying to liquidate the Soviet bridgeheads. They did not achieve full success, but suppressed the Soviet troops and completely ruled out the possibility of an operational breakthrough. Both sides suffered serious losses. So, the 17th Panzer Division in a few days lost 91 officers and 2,446 soldiers, Generalleutnant Walter Schilling was killed. Opposing them, the 79th Guards Rifle Division lost 4,681 men and the division commander Batyuk died of a heart attack soon after the end of the operation. Military historian Ziemke said about Izyum–Barvenkovo offensive along with the Mius offensive: "Those were small battles, like so many others quickly lost in the rush of greater events, but, nevertheless, enormously costly for both sides."

== Results ==
Soviet troops failed to realize the plan of the offensive, the German troops in Donbas avoid encirclement and defeat. Soviet historiography claims that the operation shackled the German reserves necessary for the Battle of Kursk.
