= Donbas strategic offensive (July 1943) =

Battle on the Eastern Front of WW2

Mius–Donets offensive
- Part of the Eastern Front of World War II
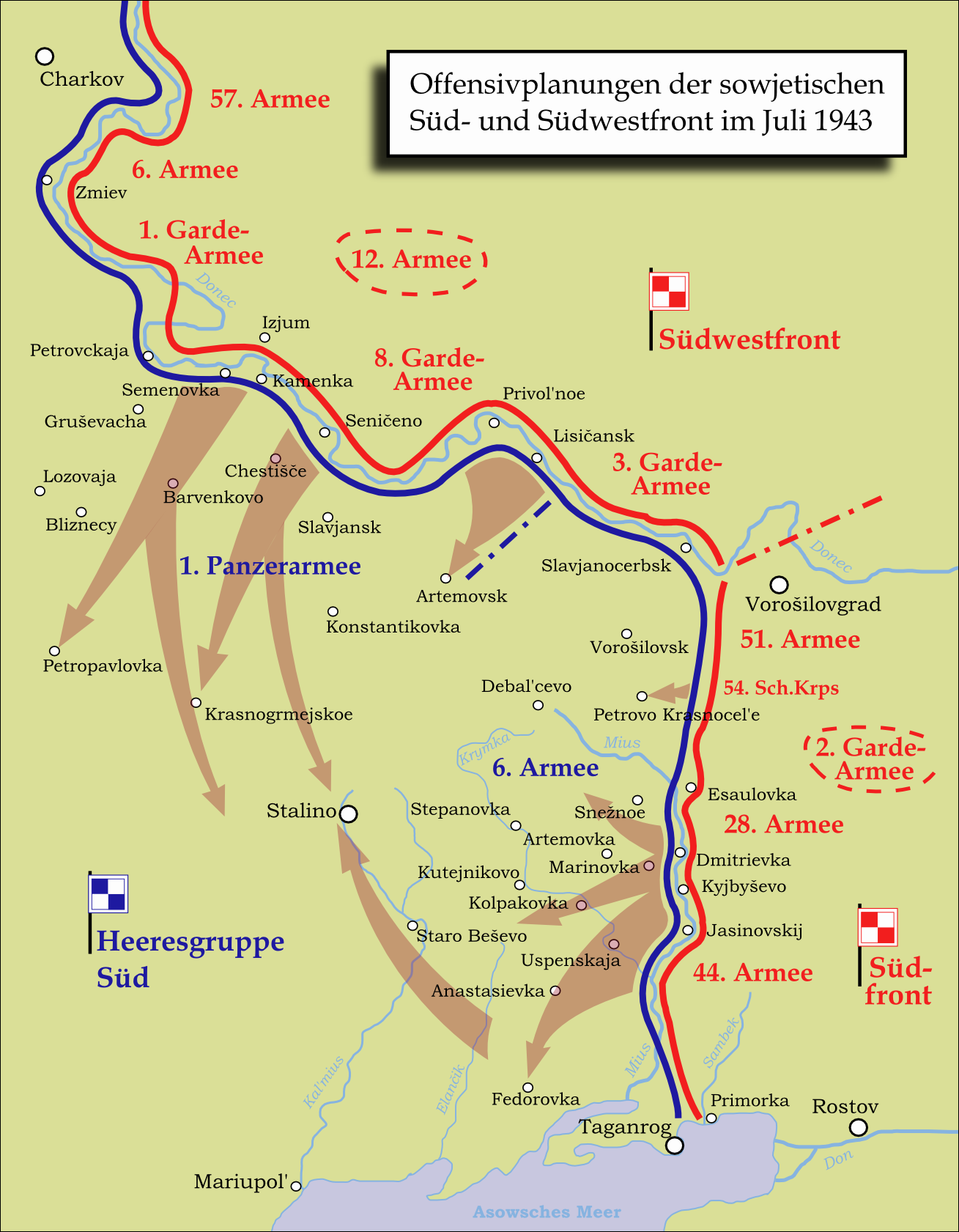
- The Soviet plan for the Donbas offensive (in German)
Date	17 July 1943 – 2 August 1943 (2 weeks and 2 days)
Location	Donets Basin, Soviet Union
Result	German victory

Belligerents
Germany	Soviet Union

Commanders and leaders
(Nazi Germany) Erich von Manstein	(Soviet Union) Fyodor Tolbukhin (Soviet Union) Rodion Malinovsky

Units involved
(Nazi Germany) Army Group South: 6th Army; 1st Panzer Army	(Soviet Union) Southern Front: 2nd Guards Army; 5th Shock Army; 28th Army; 51st Army; (Soviet Union) Southwestern Front: 1st Guards Army; 3rd Guards Army; 8th Guards Army

Strength
6th Army; 197,888 men 1st Panzer Army: 240,000 men Total: 440,000 men	Southern Front: 443,021 men 8,919 guns and mortars 679 tanks Southwestern Front: 565,000 men Total: 1,009,000 men

Casualties and losses
6th Army; 3,298 KIA; 15,817 WIA; 2,254 MIA; 1st Panzer Army; 19,930 KIA, MIA, WIA; Total: 41,299 KIA, MIA, WIA	Southwestern Front; 19,029 KIA and MIA; 51,757 WIA; Southern Front; 22,786 KIA and MIA; 71,411 WIA; Total: 164,983 KIA, MIA, WIA

The First Donbas strategic offensive, also known as the Mius-Donets Offensive, was a military campaign fought in the Donets Basin from 17 July to 2 August 1943, between the German and Soviet armed forces on the Eastern Front of World War II. The Germans contained the Soviet offensive in its northern portion after initial gains and pushed the southern portion back to its starting point.

== Background ==
In July 1943, while the Battle of Kursk was raging to the north, two German armies of Army Group South in the Donets Basin confronted two Soviet army groups on a 660-kilometer front. After the Wehrmacht launched Operation Citadel, the task of the Soviet troops in sectors of the front secondary to the Kursk Bulge became offensive operations in order to force the Wehrmacht to use their available reserves. The troops of the Southern Front and Southwestern Front began to regroup. Troops that had previously been distributed along the front for defensive purposes were now assembled into strike groups to conduct the First Donbass Strategic Offensive Operation. The headquarters of the Southwestern Front developed the following plan for its part of the offensive operation. His strike force consisted of the 1st and 8th Guards Armies and delivered the main blow in the defense zone of the XXXX Tank Corps of the German 1st Panzer Army.

== Battle ==
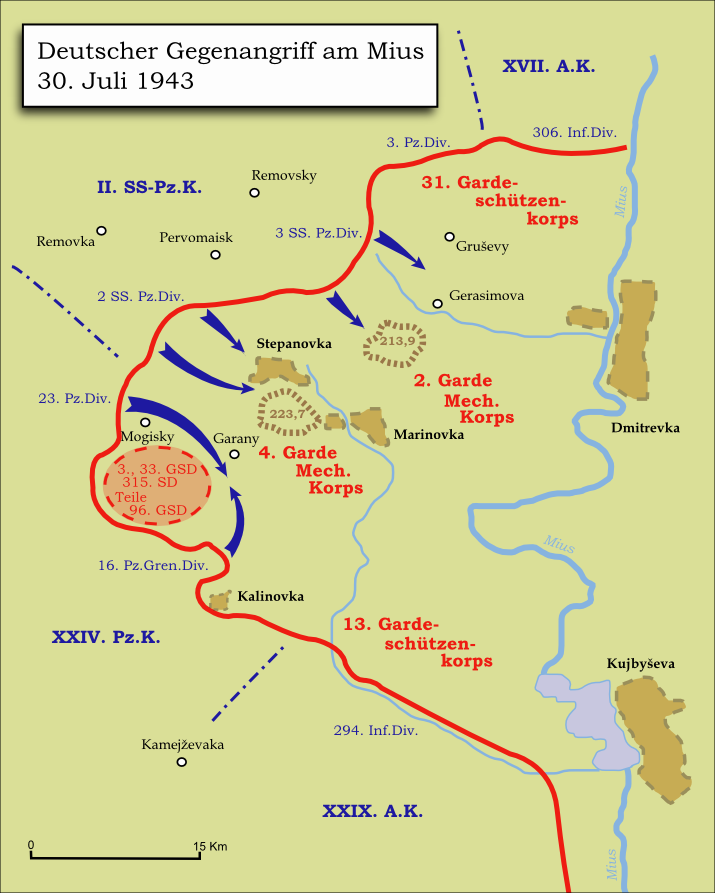
German counterattack on 30 July.

Stavka launched two offensives on 17 July in the Donets basin, involving part of the forces of the Southern and Southwestern Fronts: 474,220 men and 1,864 tanks and assault guns. The Izyum–Barvenkovo offensive against the 1st Panzer Army consisted of 202,430 Soviet troops as well as 1,109 tanks and assault guns. Air support was provided by the 17th Air Army. The Soviets established bridgeheads several kilometers deep but were stopped by a German counteroffensive led by two Panzer Divisions. After ten days the Soviets called off the operation, having lost 38,690 men. The Mius offensive deployed 271,790 men with 737 tanks and assault guns in four field armies as well as the 8th Air Army against the 11 heavily under-strength divisions of the German 6th Army. The Soviets achieved a penetration 15 kilometers deep and 20 kilometers wide, alarming the German High Command.

After initial interference from Adolf Hitler in delaying the movement of German reinforcements, a counteroffensive deploying 258 operational tanks in five Panzer and Panzergrenadier divisions, including the SS divisions Das Reich and Totenkopf, was launched on 30 July. The German counterattack was backed by the Luftwaffe's IV Air Corps, providing close air support and air interdiction against the Red Army. The attack achieved immediate success, encircling five Soviet divisions on the second day. A wild, general rout of the Soviet armies to the Mius followed. On 2 August, the Germans reached the Mius at Dmytrivka, regaining their positions after inflicting at least 61,070 casualties on the Soviets, of which 15,303 were listed as killed or missing. Actual Soviet losses were far higher, as 6th Army took 17,762 prisoners, more than the Soviet total for killed and missing.

Operationally, the Germans stopped the attacks of two Soviet army groups in their tracks and inflicted at least 99,760 casualties on the Red Army, while losing more than 21,369 men themselves. Strategically, the Red Army failed in its objectives but achieved an indirect success by forcing the transfer of German armored forces from the Kursk salient, smoothing the ground for Operation Rumyantsev, the Soviet attack on Kharkov, which was launched on 3 August. The Germans were forced once again to redeploy their most battle-worthy mechanized divisions to contain this more immediate threat, which the Soviets exploited by launching a successful offensive in the Donets region on 13 August, deploying 1,053,000 men.

== Casualties and losses ==
The positional battle on Mius River resulted in heavy losses for the troops of the Soviet Southern Front. Subsequently, the chief of staff of the front, Sergey Biryuzov, wrote in his memoirs: “For the troops of the Southern Front, the July operation was a kind of dress rehearsal. It’s just a pity that this rehearsal cost us too much.”

The 2nd Guards Army, with a total strength of 72,606 men at the beginning of the operation, taking into account the attached 2nd and 4th Guards Mechanized Corps, over the two decades of July and the first ten days of August, lost 39,812 men killed, wounded and missing, of which irretrievable losses ( killed, missing, and for other reasons) amounted to 8,405 men. In fact, in the July battles, half of the army personnel were knocked out. In a report compiled at the headquarters of the 2nd Guards Army following the battles, losses in the battles on the Mius River were compared with losses during the onset of winter 1942–1943, then the army lost an average of 1,200–1,300 men per day, and in the July battles the average daily losses were about 2,400 men.

The total losses of the Soviet 5th Shock Army over the two decades of July and the first ten days of August amounted to 34,507 men, of which 8,485 men were killed and captured (according to Soviet military terminology, irrevocably). The total losses of the 28th Army amounted to 19,878 men, including 5,829 permanent casualties. According to German data, the total number of Soviet prisoners captured by the German 6th Army from July 17 to August 3 was 17,762, including 995 defectors. Thus, the total losses of the three Soviet armies participating in the Mius operation over the two decades of July and the first ten days of August 1943 amounted to 94,197 soldiers, including 22,786 killed, captured and missing.

The German 6th Army's own losses from July 10 to August 10, 1943 amounted to 3,298 killed, 15,817 wounded and 2,254 missing.

In the Izyum-Barvenkovsky operation undertaken in July 1943, the Soviet troops of the Southwestern Front did not achieve success. The total losses of the Soviet 1st Guards Army during the second and third decades of July and the first decade of August amounted to 24,157 men, of which the army permanently lost 6,251 men. The total losses of the 8th Guards Army amounted to 38,320 men, of which 9,215 men were killed, captured and missing. The 3rd Guards Army lost 11,309 men in the second and third decades of July 1943, of whom were killed, captured missing and missing - 3,563 men. The total losses of the three armies in the Izyum-Barvenkovsky operation amounted to 70,786 men, of which 19,029 were killed and missing, as well as lost for other reasons, 51,757 were wounded and sick.

The German 1st Panzer Army lost 2,897 killed and missing in action and another 9,287 wounded from July 17 to 24. From July 25 to August 15, the army lost another 2,420 killed or missing and 5,326 wounded. Thus, the total losses of the 1st Panzer Army, which repelled the advance of the Southwestern Front troops, amounted to 19,930 men, of which 5,317 were KIA and MIA.

== Bibliography ==
- Frieser, Karl-Heinz; Schmider, Klaus; Schönherr, Klaus; Schreiber, Gerhard; Ungváry, Kristián; Wegner, Bernd (2007). Die Ostfront 1943/44 – Der Krieg im Osten und an den Nebenfronten [The Eastern Front 1943–1944: The War in the East and on the Neighbouring Fronts] (in German). Vol. VIII. München: Deutsche Verlags-Anstalt. ISBN 978-3-421-06235-2.
