= Donbas strategic offensive (August 1943) =

1943 Red Army strategic offensive of World War II

- Part of the Eastern Front of World War II
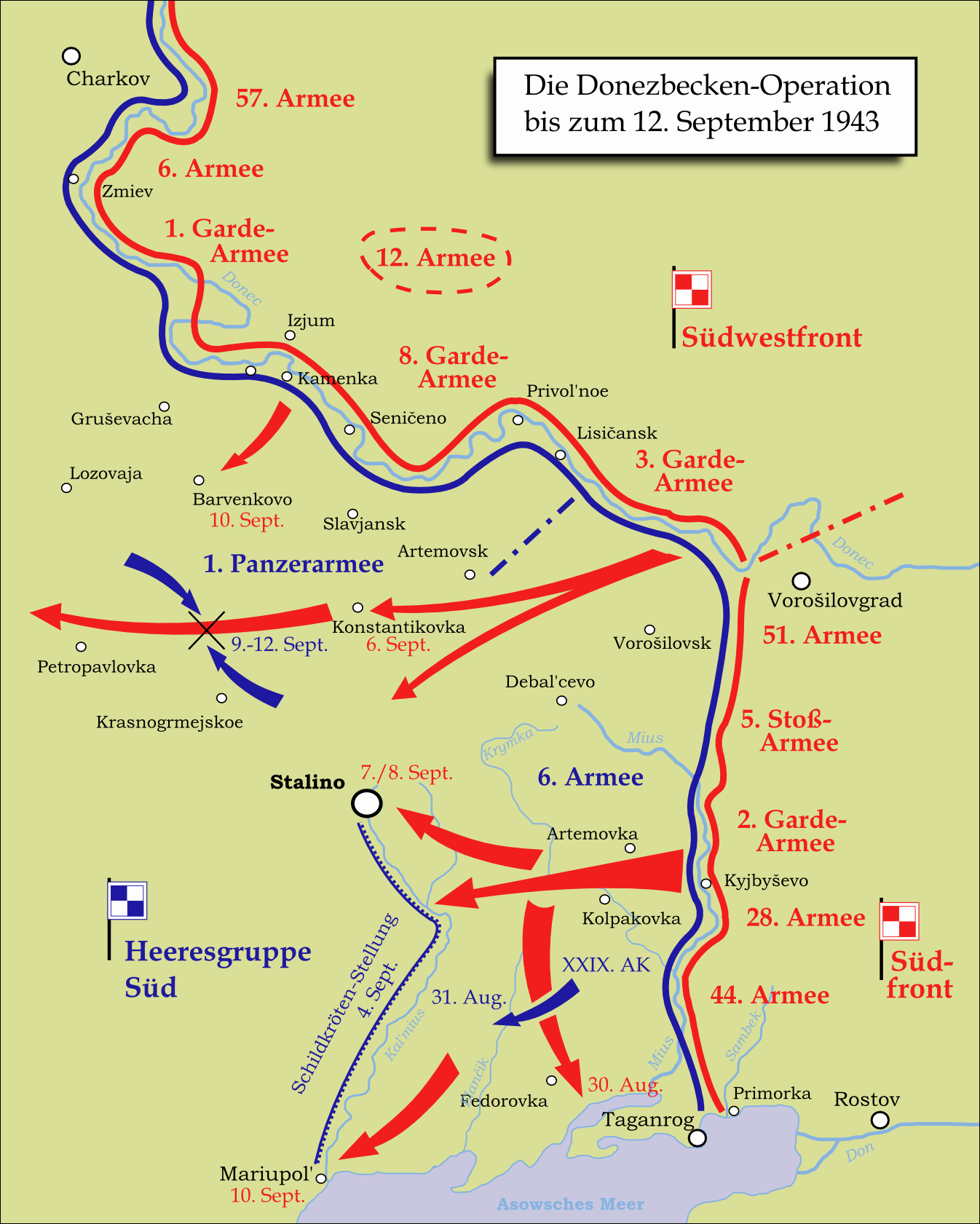
- Map of the Donbas offensive (in German)
Date	13 August 1943 – 22 September 1943 (1 month, 1 week and 2 days)
Location	Donetsk Basin, Soviet Union
Result	Soviet victory

Belligerents
Soviet Union	(Nazi Germany) Germany

Commanders and leaders
Fyodor Tolbukhin; Rodion Malinovsky	Erich von Manstein; Karl-Adolf Hollidt; Eberhard von Mackensen

Units involved
Southern Front; Southwestern Front	Army Group South 6th Army 1st Panzer Army

Strength
1,053,000 men 1,257 tanks and assault guns 21,000 guns and mortars 1,400 combat aircraft	Around 400,000 men

Casualties and losses
273,522 men: 66,166 killed, captured or missing; 207,356 wounded or sick; 886 tanks and assault guns destroyed 814 guns and mortars 327 aircraft	28,940 men (German claim) (11 August – 20 September): 4,721 killed; 21,234 wounded; 2,985 missing

The Donbas strategic offensive was the second of two strategic operations of the Soviet Red Army on the Eastern Front of World War II, with the goal of liberating the Donetsk Basin, or Donbas, from the forces of Nazi Germany.

== Situation prior to the offensive ==
=== German ===
With the Battle of Kursk raging to the north, and significant reserves pulled from both 1st Panzer and Sixth Armies to allow for such a grand offensive, the German situation in the Donbas area was not particularly solid. 1st Panzer Army under von Mackensen had no Panzer divisions at its disposal, and instead had nine infantry divisions that had been thinned significantly for Manstein's push on the southern portion of the Kursk salient. Likewise, Sixth Army, who had only just been reconstructed from its annihilation at Stalingrad, was allotted eight infantry and one GebirgsJager division.

The troops that manned this sector of the front were not as well-equipped as their northern counterparts, and some Luftwaffe field divisions were included in the order of battle for Sixth and First Panzer Armies. To make matters worse, replacements had not kept up with growing loses on the Eastern front as a whole, and this sector was no different. A previous Soviet offensive in the area had been beaten back with the assistance of SS and regular Panzer divisions, but these had since been removed to address more pressing matters to the north; in particular the battles surrounding Kharkov. Therefore, on the 16th of August, when the Red Army struck, the German forces in this area would be hard pressed to hold the line without the assistance of either the river Donets or strong armored support to push back the Soviet onslaught.

=== Soviet ===
After the failed offensive just weeks earlier, Stavka ordered the Southwest and South fronts to reconsider their attack, and make preparations for a renewed offensive later in August. Similar to the offensive in July, the Soviets intended to surround the bulk of the Sixth army closing the gap around the city of Stalino. From the north, the 8th and 3rd Guard armies were to strike southward toward Debal'cevo, whilst 44th, 28th, 2nd Guard, and 5th Shock armies were to push generally westward and keep up the pressure on Sixth army's weak units.

The main concern from Southern Front's commander, FI Tolbuchin, was the relative weakness of his units after July's failed attacks. For this, he was granted a slight delay of two days after Southwest Front had begun its offensive against First Panzer Army. This respite would allow the Germans to detect the intentions of the Soviet plans, was considered necessary to prevent a disaster.

== Course of the operation ==
The Donbas operation began on 13 August 1943 with the offensive of the right wing of the Southwestern Front. These troops forced the Donets river and advancing along the right bank of the river, helped the Steppe Front with the liberation of Kharkiv.

On 16 August, the Southern Front troops went on the offensive and broke through the German defense on the Mius River. Between 25 August and the morning of 27 August, the Soviet forces paused briefly for ammunition and supplies to be brought up. Despite this apparent opportunity to reform the line, and withdraw west at best speed, General Hollidt was unable to secure approval, with dire consequences for the XXIX Corps. The 27th saw the Soviet assault renewed in earnest, and quickly it became apparent that Sixth Army was on the verge of collapse. Desperate fighting occurred all across the front, but men of the 2nd Guards and 5th Shock armies forced their way forward, threatening to encircle XXIX Corps. On 30 August, Taganrog was liberated in combination with a naval operation. Meanwhile, the 13th Panzer tried to reestablish contact with the isolated corps, but to no avail.

By 31 August, 6th Army made a new attempt to relieve and withdraw the remaining men in the pocket. With the 17th Panzer division leading the way, and with support form the 3rd GebirgsJäger division, a tenuous connection was made with the XXIX Army Corps. Quickly, and under remorseless Soviet artillery fire, the pocket was swiftly (albeit with heavy costs) evacuated just south of Konkowo. The 15th Luftwaffe Field Division alone suffered heavy casualties, its 30th Lw. Jäger Regiment was reduced to 400 men, from an authorized strength of 2,400.

As Army Group South was threatened with dismemberment and destruction, Hitler finally allowed Manstein to withdraw across the Dnieper on 15 September.

On 1 September 1943, German troops had already begun to retreat on the entire front in the Donbas. On 5 September, Soviet troops liberated Horlivka and Artemivsk (now Bakhmut), and on 8 September, the largest Donbas city, Stalino (now Donetsk). During this time, the southern wing of 1st Panzer Army had difficulty remaining in contact with the retreating elements of the German 6th Army. By 6 September 1943, this section of the front had been broken apart by continual fighting and Red Army pressure. After the fall of Stalino, Manstein was forced to continue his retreat to the Dnieper river, all the while under heavy pressure from Soviet tank and mechanized units.

On 9 September, however, an opportunity presented itself to 1st Panzer Army. The 3rd Guards Army, in particular the 1st Mechanized Corps, was overexposed in the gap between the German armies, and had not properly protected its flanks. A kampfgruppe was quickly formed from elements of the 23rd Panzer Division and 16th PanzerGrenadier Division that struck the 1st Mechanized from the north and south. In the course of 3 days the gap had been successfully closed, with the majority of two Soviet corps now behind enemy lines. Unfortunately for the Germans, this victory could not be exploited to its fullest extent, and the retreat westward continued.

During the withdrawal, Manstein ordered scorched earth actions, and Soviet partisans hampered the retreating German Army.

Pursuing the enemy, the troops of the South-Western Front on September 22 chased the Germans behind the Dnieper at Dnipropetrovsk (Dnipro) and Zaporizhzhia, while troops of the Southern Front on the same day reached the Molochna River. This ended the Donbas operation.

== Results ==
As a result of the Soviet victory, the German Army had been forced to rapidly fall back more than 300 kilometers to the Panther–Wotan line along the Dnieper, which was still under construction.

Furthermore, the contribution of the important economic region no longer benefited Nazi Germany, and by 1944 the Soviet Union had restarted its industrial operations in the region. As a byproduct of the Soviet offensive, the German forces was also forced to retreat from the Kuban Bridgehead, as the Soviets advanced towards the Perekop Isthmus, which they took in November 1943 after the Melitopol Offensive.

== Postwar assessment ==
In 1949, Erich von Manstein was tried for war crimes in Ukraine, found guilty on 9 of 17 charges, and sentenced to 18 years in prison. He was released in 1953 due to health problems and support of Konrad Adenauer, Winston Churchill, and others.

== Bibliography ==
- Frieser, Karl-Heinz; Schmider, Klaus; Schönherr, Klaus; Schreiber, Gerhard; Ungváry, Kristián; Wegner, Bernd (2007). Die Ostfront 1943/44 – Der Krieg im Osten und an den Nebenfronten [The Eastern Front 1943–1944: The War in the East and on the Neighbouring Fronts] (in German). Vol. VIII. München: Deutsche Verlags-Anstalt. ISBN 978-3-421-06235-2.
