= XXIV Army Corps (Wehrmacht) =

German WW2 unit

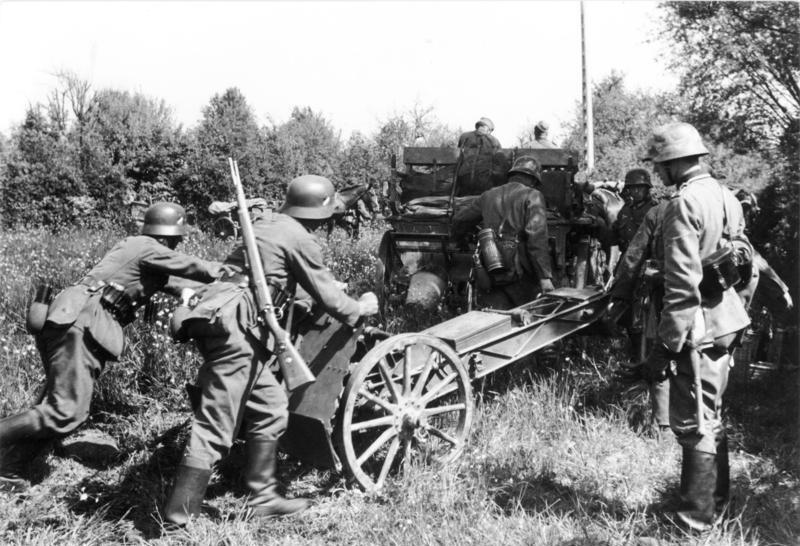

The XXIV Army Corps (German: XXIV. Armeekorps) was a unit of the German Army during World War II. The unit was re-designated several times; originally being Generalkommando der Grenztruppen Saarpfalz, later Generalkommando XXIV. Armeekorps, then XXIV. Armeekorps (mot.) and finally XXIV. Panzerkorps.

== History ==
The Generalkommando der Grenztruppen Saarpfalz was created in October 1938 in Kaiserslautern in army sector XII under the command of General der Pioniere Walter Kuntze as one of three such general commands. On August 26, 1939, the corps was mobilized and on September 17 of the same year renamed to 24th Army Corps. At the start of World War II it contained several regiments of border infantry in addition to the three Infantry-Divisions. The corps was assigned to the 1st Army of Army Group C from the beginning of the Phoney War until the end of the Battle of France; and operated primarily defensively on the western border. In the final phase of the Battle of France, it participated in the breakthrough of the Maginot Line. Afterwards it remained in France until November 1940, when it was transferred back to the homeland and converted into a motorized army corps.

=== 1941 ===
In May 1941, the XXIV. Armeekorps (mot.) was transferred to German-occupied Poland, where it was assigned to the 2nd Panzer Army of Army Group Centre under Colonel General Heinz Guderian. Here it took part in the encirclement battles at Białystok–Minsk, Smolensk, Kiev and Bryansk and afterwards in the advance on Tula. During the Battle of Moscow in the winter of 1941/42 it had to withdraw back to Bryansk.

=== 1942 ===
After being refreshed in May, it was assigned in June 1942 to the 4th Panzer Army of Army Group South in order to take part in the German summer offensive Case Blue. In July its name was changed to XXIV. Panzerkorps. In August, during the advance on Stalingrad and the Battle of Kalach, the corps was temporarily assigned to the 6. Army, until the general command was transferred in order to reinforce the Hungarian 2nd Army around the central Don River in September. With that, divisions with relatively little combat experience were assigned to it. On October 3 Commanding General Willibald von Langermann und Erlencamp was killed by artillery fire during a trip to the front near Storoschewoje.

=== 1943 ===
In January 1943, during the Soviet Ostrogozhsk–Rossosh Offensive, a pincer move as part of Operation Little Saturn, the corps was effectively destroyed. The headquarters was overrun near Schilin, the staff driven off and the Commanding General, Generalleutnant Martin Wandel, being killed. Generalleutnant Arno Jahr, who temporarily assumed leadership of the corps, killed himself on 20 January near Podgornoje. On the following day his successor, Karl Eibl, was killed in a friendly-fire accident with Italian troops, being mistaken for the enemy in the fog. In February the remaining troops of the corps were gathered in the area of Starobilsk and assigned to Armeeabteilung Lanz. On 9 February, General der Panzertruppe Walther Nehring, who had fought in the North African Campaign, took over leadership of the corps. It was then rebuilt through May '43 with the addition of fresh units. During Operation Citadel in July 1943, the corps acted as the reserve for Army Group South under Erich von Manstein. However, it was not put into action here but instead was transferred south to defend against the Soviet Donbass Offensive. Directly afterwards it was deployed to defend against the Belgorod-Kharkov Offensive Operation. There followed some defensive battles along the Mius River in conjunction with the 4th Panzer Army, and the retreat to the Dnieper as well as battles around Kiev.

=== 1944 ===
Before the Dnieper–Carpathian Offensive in January 1944, the corps had to withdraw to the Vinnytsia area, after which it was transferred to the 1st Panzer Army in Luzk, together with whom it had to fight out of the Kamenets-Podolsky pocket in March. After that it fought in Galicia and Zakarpattia and around the bridgehead Baranów Sandomierski.

=== 1945 ===
In the winter of 1944–45 the corps was re-formed into a Panzerkorps neuer Art per a Führer-directive of September 13, 1944. In January 1945 the corps had to withdraw ahead of the Vistula–Oder Offensive to Glogau on the river Oder. At the end of the war, the corps was assigned to the 1. Panzer Army near České Budějovice in Czechoslovakia.

== Commanding generals ==
- General der Pioniere Walter Kuntze – 1 October 1938 until 14 February 1940
- General der Kavallerie/General der Panzertruppe Leo Geyr von Schweppenburg – 14 February 1940 until 7 January 1942
- General der Panzertruppe Willibald von Langermann und Erlencamp – 7 January until 3 October 1942 (KIA)
- General der Panzertruppe Otto von Knobelsdorff – 3 October until 30 November 1942
- Generalleutnant Martin Wandel – 30 November 1942 until 14. January 1943 (MIA)
- Generalleutnant Arno Jahr – 14 January until 20 January 1943 (m.st.F.b.; Suicide)
- Generalleutnant Karl Eibl – 20 January until 21 January 1943 (KIA)
- Oberst Otto Heidkämper – 21 January until 9 February 1943 (m.st.F.b.)
- General der Panzertruppe Walther Nehring – 9 February 1943 until 27 June 1944
- Generalleutnant Fritz-Hubert Gräser – 27 June until 5 August 1944
- Generalleutnant Karl von Le Suire – 5 August until 20 August 1944 (died as POW)
- Generalleutnant Maximilian von Edelsheim – 20 August until 22 September 1944 (acting)
- General der Panzertruppe Walther Nehring – 15 October 1944 until 19 March 1945
- Generalleutnant Hans Källner – 19 March until 1 April 1945
- General der Artillerie Walter Hartmann – 1 April 1945 until war's end

== Order of battle ==
=== Corps troops (selection) ===
- Arko 143/424
- Corps-Messenger-Department 424
- Corps-Replenishment 311/424

=== Assigned units ===
September 1939

- 6. Infanterie-Division
- 9. Infanterie-Division
- 36. Infanterie-Division
- 6 Border Infantry regiments

June 1940

- 60. Infanterie-Division
- 252. Infanterie-Division
- 168. Infanterie-Division

June 1941

- 1. Kavallerie-Division
- 3. Panzer-Division
- 4. Panzer-Division
- 10. Infanterie-Division (mot.)

June 1942

- 377. Infanterie-Division
- 9. Panzer-Division
- 3. Infanterie-Division (mot.)

December 1942

- 385. Infanterie-Division
- 387. Infanterie-Division
- 27. Panzer-Division (Elements)
- 213. Sicherungs-Division (Elements)
- Gruppe Fegelein

July 1943

- SS-Division „Wiking“
- 17. Panzer-Division
- 23. Panzer-Division

January 1945

- 16. Panzer-Division
- 17. Panzer-Division

== Literature ==
- Verbände und Truppen der deutschen Wehrmacht und Waffen-SS im Zweiten Weltkrieg 1939–1945: Band 4. ISBN 3764810831.
