= 385th Division =

385th Division may refer to:

- 385th Infantry Division, Wehrmacht, Germany
- 385th Rifle Division, Soviet Union

== See also ==
- List of military divisions by number
- 385th (disambiguation)
