= Heinrich Eberbach =

German general

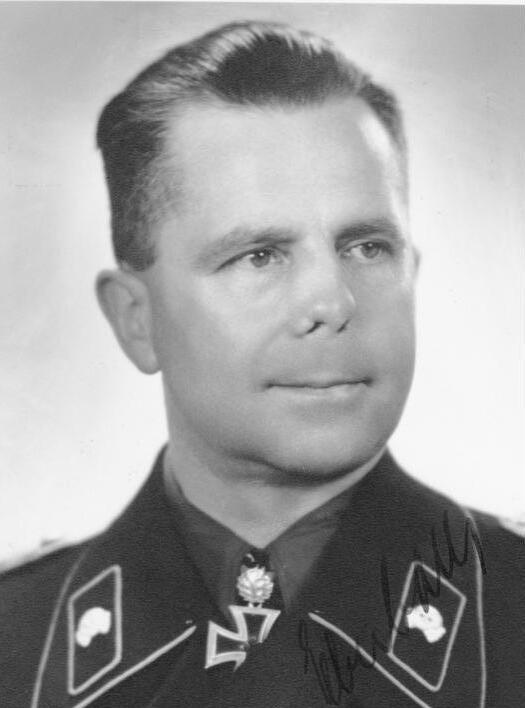
- Eberbach in 1941
- Born: 24 November 1895; Stuttgart, Kingdom of Württemberg, German Empire
- Died: 13 July 1992 (aged 96); Notzingen, Baden-Württemberg, Germany
- Relatives: ∞ 1920 Anna Lempp; 3 sons
- Military career
- Allegiance: German Empire; Weimar Republic; Nazi Germany
- Branch: Royal Württemberg Army; Imperial German Army; Reichsheer; Police; German Army
- Service years: 1914; 1914–1918; 1919–1920; 1920–1935; 1935–1945
- Rank: General der Panzertruppe
- Commands: 4th Panzer Division; 5th Panzer Army; 7th Army
- Conflicts: World War I World War II: Poland Campaign; Battle of France; Operation Barbarossa; Battle of Moscow; Falaise Pocket
- Awards: Knight's Cross of the Iron Cross with Oak Leaves
- Other work: Author

Heinrich Alfons Willy Eberbach (24 November 1895 – 13 July 1992) was a German general during World War II who commanded the 5th Panzer Army during the Allied invasion of Normandy. He was a recipient of the Knight's Cross of the Iron Cross with Oak Leaves of Nazi Germany.

== World War I and interwar years ==
Heinrich Eberbach was born on 24 November 1895 in Stuttgart, in the German Empire. Eberbach graduated from Gymnasium with his Abitur (university-preparatory high school diploma) on 30 June 1914. On 1 July 1914, Eberbach joined the Army of Württemberg. With the outbreak of World War I, Eberbach's unit was deployed on the Western Front as part of the Imperial German Army. On 16 October 1914, Eberbach was wounded in his thigh by artillery shrapnel. In September 1915, Eberbach was severely wounded, losing part of his nose, and was taken prisoner of war by French forces. He was repatriated on 19 November 1919. During the 1920s, Eberbach was a police officer; in 1935 he joined the Wehrmacht. On 10 November 1938, Eberbach became commander of the Panzer-Regiment 35, in the newly formed 4th Panzer Division under General Georg-Hans Reinhardt.

== World War II ==
Eberbach participated in the German Invasion of Poland in September 1939 and then in 1940 in the Battle of France. His unit supported General Hasso von Manteuffel's offensive across the Meuse River in May. Shortly after the start of Germany's invasion of the Soviet Union in June 1941, he was assigned as commander of the 5th Panzer Brigade in Leo Geyr von Schweppenburg's XXIV Panzer Corps.

During the Battle of Moscow, Eberbach spearheaded Panzer Group 2's offensive towards Moscow as the commander of a combined-arms Kampfgruppe within the 4th Panzer Division. The attack began on September 30 and in only two days of fighting Kampfgruppe Eberbach had achieved a clean breakthrough, advanced over 120 kilometers, and put the entire Soviet Bryansk Front in a disastrous position while suffering negligible losses of its own. Eberbach demonstrated his flexibility as a troop leader by detaching two battalions to assist the 3rd Panzer Division's efforts in the same area of operations near Bryansk, despite serving under a different division. Soviet air attacks and a fuel shortage early on 2 October failed to prevent the kampfgruppe's aggressive combat leaders from advancing on the city of Orel, ending the Soviet industrial relocation efforts there and capturing a key communications hub of the Bryansk Front, on 3 October. Kampfgruppe Eberbach's losses had been light: 6 tanks knocked out, 34 men killed and 121 wounded. This was a small price to pay for the complete rupturing of the Soviet lines and the capture of a city of such strategic value. 4th Panzer division had also captured 1,600 Soviet troops, mostly Kampfgruppe Eberbach's work.

In March 1942 he was made commander of the 4th Panzer Division, in the German lines opposite the Russian town of Sukhinichi, roughly 120 miles west of Tula. In late November 1942 Eberbach was appointed commander of the XLVIII Panzer Corps that had just been overrun in the initial days of Operation Uranus, near the midpoint of the Battle of Stalingrad. Eberbach was soon wounded and evacuated, remaining hospitalized until February. He then became Inspector of the Armored Troops in the Home Army, was awarded the Knight's Cross of the Iron Cross and promoted to lieutenant general.

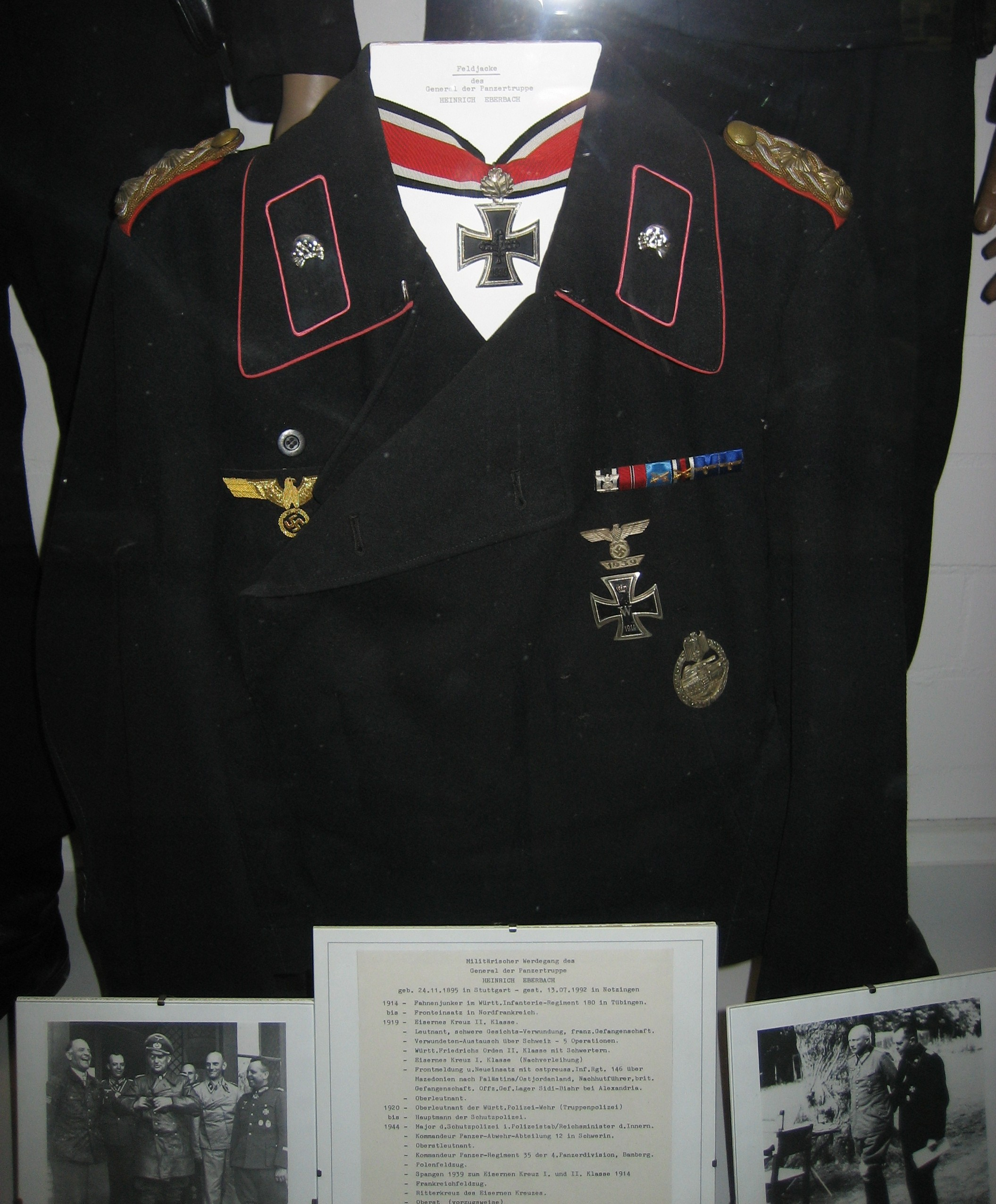
Heinrich Eberbach's uniform (Deutsches Panzermuseum Munster)

In November 1943, Eberbach became commander of troops around Nikopol and fought in battles around Zhitomir in the Soviet Union. In early 1944 Eberbach was promoted to the rank of General der Panzertruppe. During the Allied invasion of Normandy, he fought against the British landings along the 'Juno' and 'Sword' beaches. On 4 July 1944, he took command of "Panzer Group West" (later, 5th Panzer Army) after Leo Geyr von Schweppenburg was relieved (two days before). On 9 August, this force was divided, with 5th Panzer Army retreating with the most damaged units; the effective units were reorganized as Panzergruppe Eberbach.

Eberbach was directed to lead this force in the counterattack through Mortain toward Avranches that was intended to cut off the Allied forces which had broken out of Normandy. According to Eberbach's post-war memoirs, he had no confidence in the attack. When General Warlimont of OKW arrived at his HQ on 1 August to "get a closer look at the situation", Eberbach told him that "the only possible solution was an immediate retreat to the Seine-Yonne line." However, Warlimont denied Eberbach's request to withdraw, and instead confirmed the order to attack.

The attack failed, and most of Panzergruppe Eberbach and 7th Army was surrounded and destroyed in the Falaise Pocket. Eberbach escaped and was given command of the remnants of 7th Army on 21 August. On 31 August Eberbach was surprised in his bed and captured by British troops at Amiens. He was later presented to Lieutenant General Brian Horrocks.

== Post World War II ==
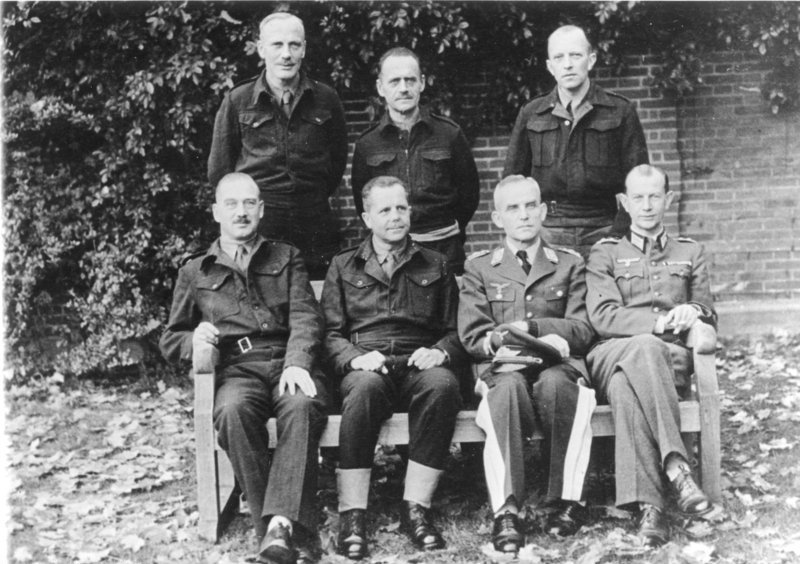
At Trent Park POW camp

Eberbach was held in a prisoner-of-war camp until 1948. He participated in the work of the U.S. Army Historical Division, where, under the guidance of Franz Halder, German generals wrote World War II operational studies for the U.S. Army, first as POWs and then as employees. Eberbach was the father of the naval officer Heinz-Eugen Eberbach, commander of U-967 and U-230 during World War II.

== Awards and decorations ==
- Iron Cross (1914), 2nd and 1st Class
  - 2nd Class on 12 October 1914
  - 1st Class on 10 November 1917
- Friedrich Order, Knight's Cross 2nd Class with Swords (WF3bX) on 8 June 1917
- Wound Badge (1918) in Black
- Honour Cross of the World War 1914/1918 with Swords
- Wehrmacht Long Service Award, 4th to 1st Class
  - 2nd Class on 2 October 1936
  - 1st Class in 1939
- Repetition Clasp 1939 to the Iron Cross 1914, 2nd and 1st Class
  - 2nd Class on 23 September 1939
  - 1st Class on 2 October 1939
- Panzer Badge in Silver on 20 June 1940
- Honour Roll Clasp of the Army on 8 December 1941
- Winter Battle in the East 1941–42 Medal on 14 August 1942
- Wound Badge (1939) in Silver
- Knight's Cross of the Iron Cross with Oak Leaves
  - Knight's Cross on 4 July 1940 as Oberstleutnant and Commander of the Panzer-Regiment 35
  - Oak Leaves on 1 January 1942 as Oberst and Commander of the 5. Panzer-Brigade

== Works ==
- Eberbach, Heinrich (1945–1954). Panzer Group Eberbach and the Falaise Encirclement. Karlsruhe, Germany: Historical Division, Headquarters United States Army, Europe, Foreign Military Studies Branch. OCLC 33089881.

Military offices
Preceded by General der Panzertruppe Willibald Freiherr von Langermann und Erlencamp	Commander of 4. Panzer-Division; 6 January 1942 – 2 March 1942	Succeeded by Generalleutnant Otto Heidkämper
Preceded by Generalleutnant Otto Heidkämper	Commander of 4. Panzer-Division; 4 April 1942 – 14 November 1942	Succeeded by Generalleutnant Erich Schneider
Preceded by General der Panzertruppe Hans Cramer	Commander of XLVIII Panzer Corps; 26 November 1942 – 30 November 1942	Succeeded by General der Panzertruppe Otto von Knobelsdorff
Preceded by General der Infanterie Dietrich von Choltitz	Commander of XLVIII Panzer Corps; 22 October 1943 – 14 November 1943	Succeeded by General der Panzertruppe Hermann Balck
Preceded by Waffen SS General Paul Hausser	Commander of 7. Armee; 21 August 1944 – 30 August 1944	Succeeded by General Erich Brandenberger
