= Raid on La Caine =

Air attack on Panzergruppe West HQ during Battle of Normandy

RAF raid on La Caine (1944)
- Part of the Battle of Normandy
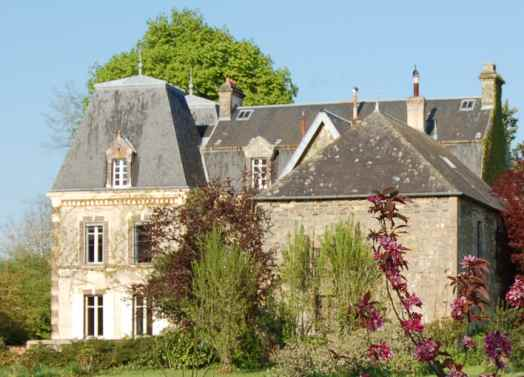
- Modern photograph of the château (Panzergruppe West HQ, 1944)
Date	10 June 1944
Location	La Caine, France 49°02′07″N 0°31′08″W
Result	Allied victory

Belligerents
United Kingdom	Germany

Commanders and leaders
Arthur Coningham	Leo Geyr von Schweppenburg (WIA); Sigismund-Helmut von Dawans †

Units involved
RAF Second Tactical Air Force No. 121 Wing RAF–No. 124 Wing RAF: (Hawker Typhoon); 181 Squadron; 182 Squadron; 245 Squadron; 247 Squadron; No. 137 Wing RAF–No. 139 Wing RAF: (B-25 Mitchell); 98 Squadron; 180 Squadron; 226 Squadron; 320 (Netherlands) Squadron	Panzergruppe West

Strength
42 Typhoon fighter-bombers; 72 B-25 Mitchell medium bombers	

Casualties and losses
	Killed: Chief of Staff and 17 staff officers; Wounded: Geyr von Schweppenburg

On 10 June 1944, during Operation Overlord, aircraft of the Royal Air Force attacked the headquarters of Panzergruppe West in the château at La Caine, about 12 mi (19 km) to the south-west of the city of Caen, north of Thury-Harcourt.

Squadrons of B-25 Mitchell medium bombers and Typhoon fighter-bombers of the RAF Second Tactical Air Force attacked the château and its grounds with bombs and air-to-ground rockets. Eighteen staff officers were killed in the attack and the commander, General der Panzertruppen Leo Geyr von Schweppenburg was wounded.

A German armoured counter-offensive by Panzergruppe West against the Allied beachhead was postponed and then cancelled after the destruction of the headquarters. Command of Panzer divisions in the area was transferred to the I SS Panzer Corps headquarters; the remnants of the Panzergruppe West HQ was withdrawn to Paris and did not return to action until 28 June.

== Background ==
=== Panzergruppe West ===
Generalfeldmarschall (Field Marshal) Gerd von Rundstedt, Oberbefehlshaber West (OB West the commander of German forces in western Europe) established Panzergruppe West, (commanded by General der Panzertruppe Leo Geyr von Schweppenburg from 19 November 1943 to 4 July 1944) as a headquarters for the administration and training of the seven Panzer divisions based in northern France and Belgium. The organisation was also to command the Panzer divisions as a strategic reserve during the anticipated Allied invasion from Britain. On 9 June 1944, three days after the beginning of Operation Overlord, the invasion of France by the Western Allies, Generalfeldmarschall Erwin Rommel, commander of Heeresgruppe B (Army Group B) with responsibility for the defence of northern France, drove to the HQ of Panzergruppe West and gave orders for a counter-offensive against the Allied landings in Normandy. (Note: Shores and Thomas (2004) included an account of the raid on La Caine, The 'Dinner' Raid, by Malcolm Scott DFC, from which most of the details of the raid in the article are derived.)

=== Allied signals intelligence ===
The Government Code and Cypher School (GC&CS) code-breaking organisation at Bletchley Park read German radio signals encrypted by the Enigma cypher machine and was part of the system of wireless listening posts, traffic analysis and direction finding used against Germany during the war. Ultra decrypts on 11 and 18 March 1944 established the existence of Panzergruppe West and that its headquarters was in Paris. A big increase in wireless traffic from Panzergruppe West was detected by the British Monitoring Section on 8 June 1944, when the 17th SS Panzergrenadier Division came under the command of the Panzergruppe. The site of the source was identified by High-frequency direction finding (huff-duff) as the château in the commune of La Caine, about 12 mi (19 km) to the south-west of the city of Caen. The information was forwarded to Supreme Headquarters Allied Expeditionary Force (SHAEF) and other headquarters in Normandy. (Note: The text read "Battle headquarters Panzer)) (sic) Gruppe west evening ninth at La Caine (Tare nine one five two).) Panzergruppe West had taken up residence at the château and left its vehicles in the orchard with no other camouflage. (Note: The decrypts also revealed the headquarters of the I SS-Panzer Corps near Tourville-sur-Odon, which was attacked twice with no effect.) The presence of four large wireless trucks, office caravans and tents was confirmed by reconnaissance aircraft.

== Prelude ==
=== 2nd TAF ===
Early on 10 June, the RAF Second Tactical Air Force (2nd TAF) was ordered immediately to attack the château with every available aircraft. Four squadrons of Typhoon fighter-bombers were ordered to readiness; three of 124 Wing at RAF Hurn in Dorset (181 Squadron, 182 Squadron, 247 Squadron) and one of 121 Wing at RAF Holmsley South, Hampshire (245 Squadron). 139 Wing at RAF Dunsfold, comprising 98 Squadron, 180 Squadron and 320 (Netherlands) Squadron with 226 Squadron of 137 Wing at RAF Hartford Bridge flying B-25 Mitchell medium bombers were alerted. A maximum effort consisted of ten Typhoons per squadron and eighteen Mitchells from each medium bomber squadron. The Typhoons were loaded with eight 60-lb RP-3 rockets each and the Mitchells were to carry their maximum bomb loads of eight 500 lb (230 kg) bombs; four squadrons of Spitfires were to escort the bombers. The rocket-firing Typhoons were to attack at low altitude and the Mitchells to bomb at medium altitude.

=== Preparations ===
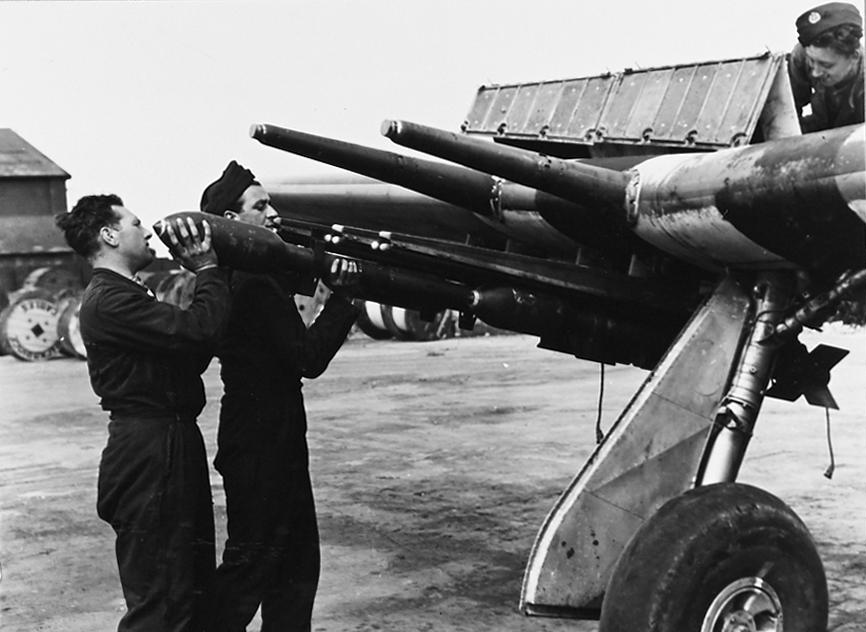
The Typhoon could carry eight 3-inch RP rockets, seen being loaded, with its four 20 mm cannon

The morning of 10 June was overcast and cloudy; the 10:30 a.m. briefing for a raid planned at 2:00 p.m. was postponed until the cloud cover diminished. (Note: Times given are British Double Summer Time which was, from 1941–1945, two hours ahead of Greenwich Mean Time.) Wing Commander Lynn, the Wing Commander (Flying), was to lead the Mitchells with 180 Squadron flying at the head of the formation. The weather was still not ideal and the first aircraft of each bomber squadron would have Gee-H navigation equipment, as a precaution against cloud over the target. While waiting on the weather, the Typhoons of 124 Wing flew two raids on gun emplacements near Caen.

The eighteen Mitchells of 180 Squadron took off in three flights of six at 8:00 p.m. followed by seventeen Mitchells of 320 (Netherlands) Squadron (Commander H. V. B. Burgerhout). At 8:10 p.m. sixteen more bombers from 98 Squadron (Squadron Leader Eager) took off, the three squadrons circling while gaining height and getting into formation, then setting course for France at 8:20 p.m. Over Selsey Bill eighteen more Mitchells of 226 Squadron (Wing Commander A. D. Mitchell) joined the formation.

The 33 Spitfire Mk Vs of Air Defence of Great Britain for close escort and the high and low cover of three Spitfire Mk IX squadrons from 84 Group 2nd TAF arrived soon afterwards. (Note: RAF Fighter Command had been split in two on 17 November 1943, the 2nd TAF for offensive operations and ADGB to defend Britain.) A Mitchell from 226 Squadron and two from 180 Squadron turned back with mechanical problems before the attack.. The spare aircraft from two of the four Typhoon squadrons had joined in, giving 42 Typhoons, eight of which operated as fighters without rockets. The Typhoons were to attack in two waves, thirty minutes apart, the first wave to attack the motor transport around the château, synchronised with the bombing by the Mitchells and the second wave to attack anything left.

== Attack ==
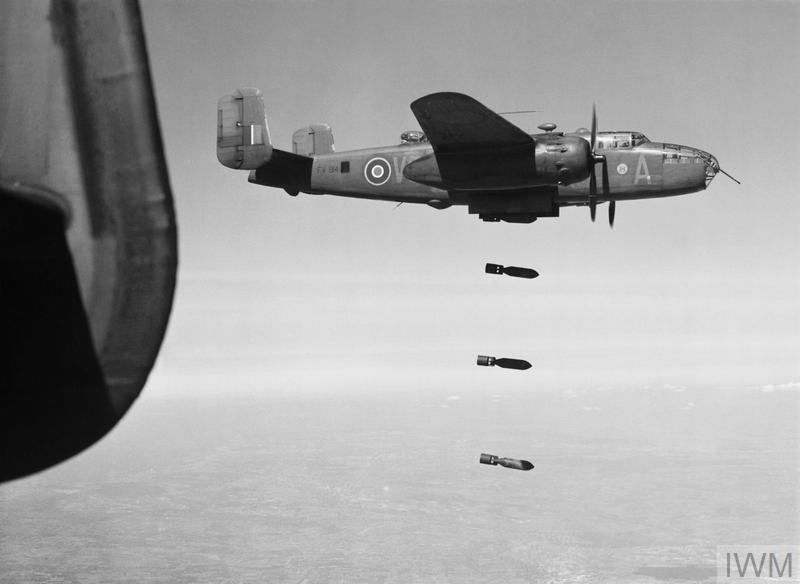
A 98 Squadron Mitchell Mark II attacking a V-1 flying bomb site

In the evening of 10 June, General Sigismund-Helmut von Dawans, the chief of staff of Panzergruppe West and 18 staff officers were at dinner in Château La Caine when air raid sirens went off. The officers hurried outside to see and watched the Typhoons through binoculars, not aware that they were the target until the last minute; Geyr arrived by car just before the attack. The 17 Typhoons of 181 and 247 squadrons fired 136 rockets from 2,000 ft (610 m). At 12,000 ft (3,700 m) the Mitchells of 139 Wing moved into Vic formation with 226 Squadron at the base of the V, the squadrons remaining in the flights of six.

At 9:15 p.m. the bombers released 552 five-hundred pound bombs. The bombs on one Mitchell "hung up" and were not released. The bombs landed with great accuracy on the château and the grounds, killing Dawans, 17 of the 18 staff officers, wounding Geyr and another officer. Four of the Typhoons not carrying rockets strafed the village of Montigny nearby. After bombing, the Mitchells turned north-west, receiving anti-aircraft fire from the vicinity of Caen. The second wave of rocket-armed Typhoons arrived to find the château and the Panzergruppe West vehicles already destroyed; the Typhoons fired their rockets at anything left standing. The Mitchells landed by 10:25 p.m. and preparations began for a night operation.

== Aftermath ==
As the Allied crews were debriefed, they claimed a big success; most bomber crews reporting that they had hit the target; anti-aircraft fire had been sparse and no German fighters had intervened, the Germans appeared to have been surprised. The attack destroyed the only German army organisation in the western theatre capable of handling a large number of mobile divisions; the survivors of Panzergruppe West were withdrawn to Paris and were not ready to resume operations until 28 June. German command of the sector was temporarily given to SS-Obergruppenführer Sepp Dietrich and the I SS Panzer Corps. In the 2009 edition of a history of the use of Ultra information, Ralph Bennett wrote that an armoured counter-attack against the Allied beachhead, planned for 10 June, was postponed for 24 hours and then cancelled. Bletchley Park decrypted German signals that Panzergruppe West had been destroyed and would have to be withdrawn to Paris to be reconstituted. The appointment of new staff commanded by General Heinrich Eberbach, delayed the plans for the German armoured counter-offensive by three weeks when it was overtaken by events.

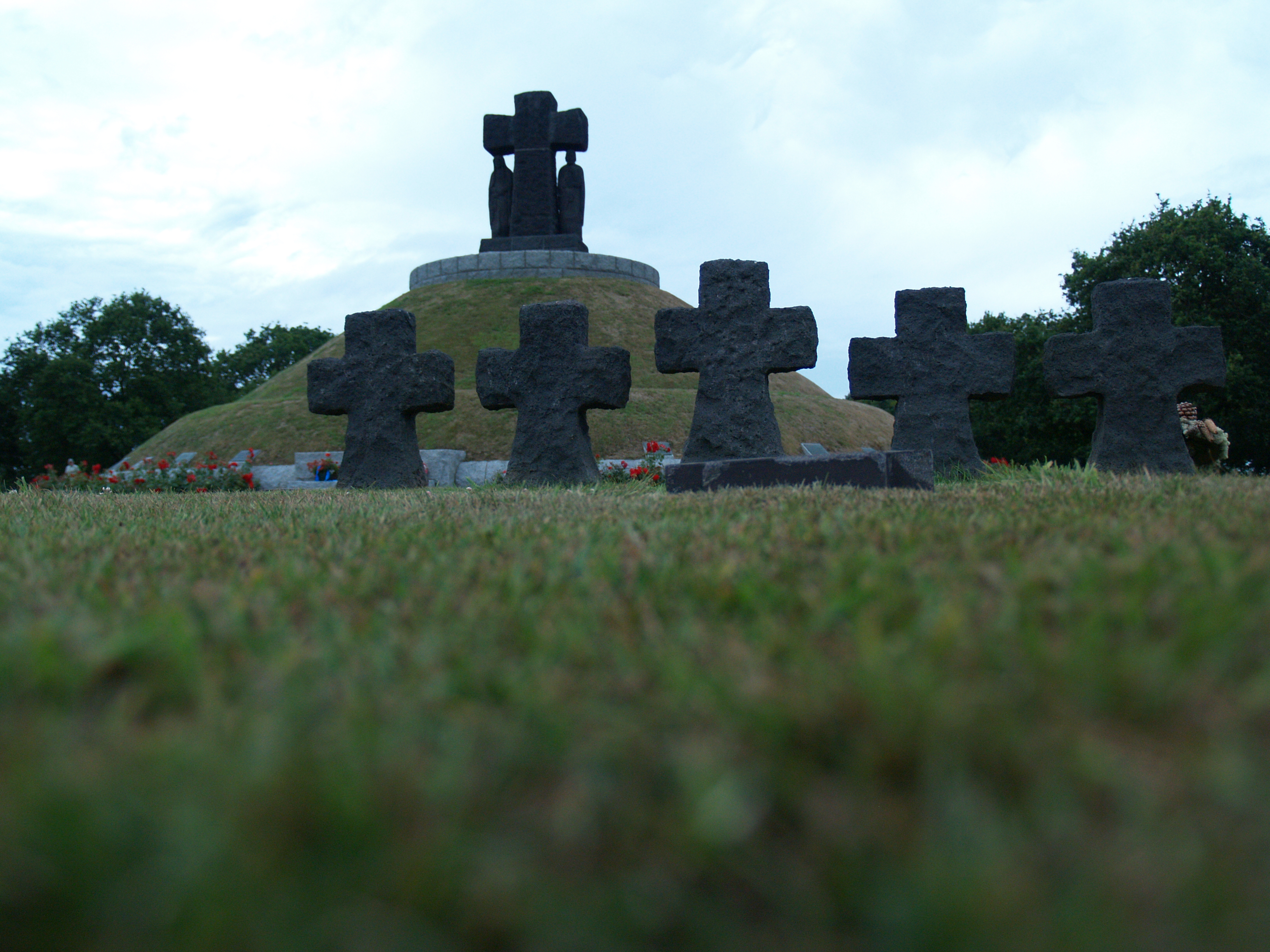
La Cambe German war cemetery

The destruction the Panzergruppe HQ contributed to the loss of the initiative by the Germans. No German suspicions were aroused about Allied code breaking, because a reconnaissance aircraft had been seen before the raid. The decrypts revealing the whereabouts of Panzergruppe West were the first of a series which exposed the positions of tactically valuable targets, including fuel and ammunition dumps, which were attacked to exacerbate German shortages, also being revealed by Ultra decrypts. Eighteen staff officers of Panzergruppe West were known to have been killed in the raid, including the chief of staff, Dawans, interred in La Cambe German war cemetery; Geyr was wounded. The château was not badly damaged but the nearby orchard, in which the HQ vehicles were parked, was thoroughly bombed and communications equipment was destroyed.
