= Sigismund-Helmut von Dawans =

German general (1899–1944)

- Born: 23 September 1899; Erfurt, Kingdom of Prussia, German Empire
- Died: 10 June 1944 (aged 44); La Caine, Occupied France
- Burial place: La Cambe German war cemetery
- Military career
- Allegiance: German Empire; Nazi Germany
- Branch: Wehrmacht
- Rank: Generalmajor
- Conflicts: First World War; Second World War: Western Front; Operation Overload; Raid on La Caine †
- Awards: German Cross in Gold

Sigismund-Helmut von Dawans (23 September 1899 – 10 June 1944) was a general in the Wehrmacht during the Second World War and a recipient of the German Cross in Gold on 26 August 1942.

Sigismund-Helmut von Dawans was born on 23 September 1899 in Erfurt. He married Ingeborg Hane on 6 April 1923.

Dawans, the chief-of-staff of Panzergruppe West (General Geyr von Schweppenburg), was killed during the raid by the Royal Air Force (RAF) attack on La Caine, the Panzergruppe HQ, on 10 June 1944.
