= 385th Brigade =

385th Brigade may refer to:

- 385th Guards Artillery Brigade, Russia/Soviet Union
- 385th Unmanned Surface Vehicles Brigade, Ukraine

== See also ==
- 385th (disambiguation)
