= Otto Heidkämper =

- Born: 13 March 1901
- Died: 17 February 1969 (aged 67)
- Military career
- Allegiance: Nazi Germany
- Branch: Army (Wehrmacht)
- Rank: Generalleutnant
- Commands: 4th Panzer Division; XXIV. Panzerkorps; Division Nr. 464; Army Group Centre
- Conflicts: World War II
- Awards: Knight's Cross of the Iron Cross

Otto Heidkämper (13 March 1901 – 17 February 1969) was a German general during World War II who commanded several divisions. During the invasion of France he served as Ia or Chief of Staff to Erwin Rommel and his 7th Panzer Division. He was a recipient of the Knight's Cross of the Iron Cross of Nazi Germany.

== Awards and decorations ==
- Knight's Cross of the Iron Cross on 8 February 1943 as Oberst i.G. and Chef des Generalstabes XXIV. Panzerkorps

Military offices
Preceded by General der Panzertruppe Heinrich Eberbach	Commander of 4. Panzer-Division; 2 March 1942 – 4 April 1942	Succeeded by General der Panzertruppe Heinrich Eberbach
Preceded by Generalleutnant Karl Eibl	Commander of XXIV. Panzerkorps; 21 January 1943 – 9 February 1943	Succeeded by General der Panzertruppe Walther Nehring
Preceded by General der Infanterie Hans Krebs	Chief of the General Staff of HeeresGruppe Mitte; 1 September 1944 - January 1945	Succeeded by Generalleutnant Wolf-Dietrich Ritter und Edler von Xylander
Preceded by Generalmajor Eugen Theilacker	Commander of Division Nr. 464; 27 April 1945 – 8 May 1945	Succeeded by None
