= La Cambe German war cemetery =

Cemetery located in Calvados, in France

- German War Graves Commission (Volksbund Deutsche Kriegsgräberfürsorge)
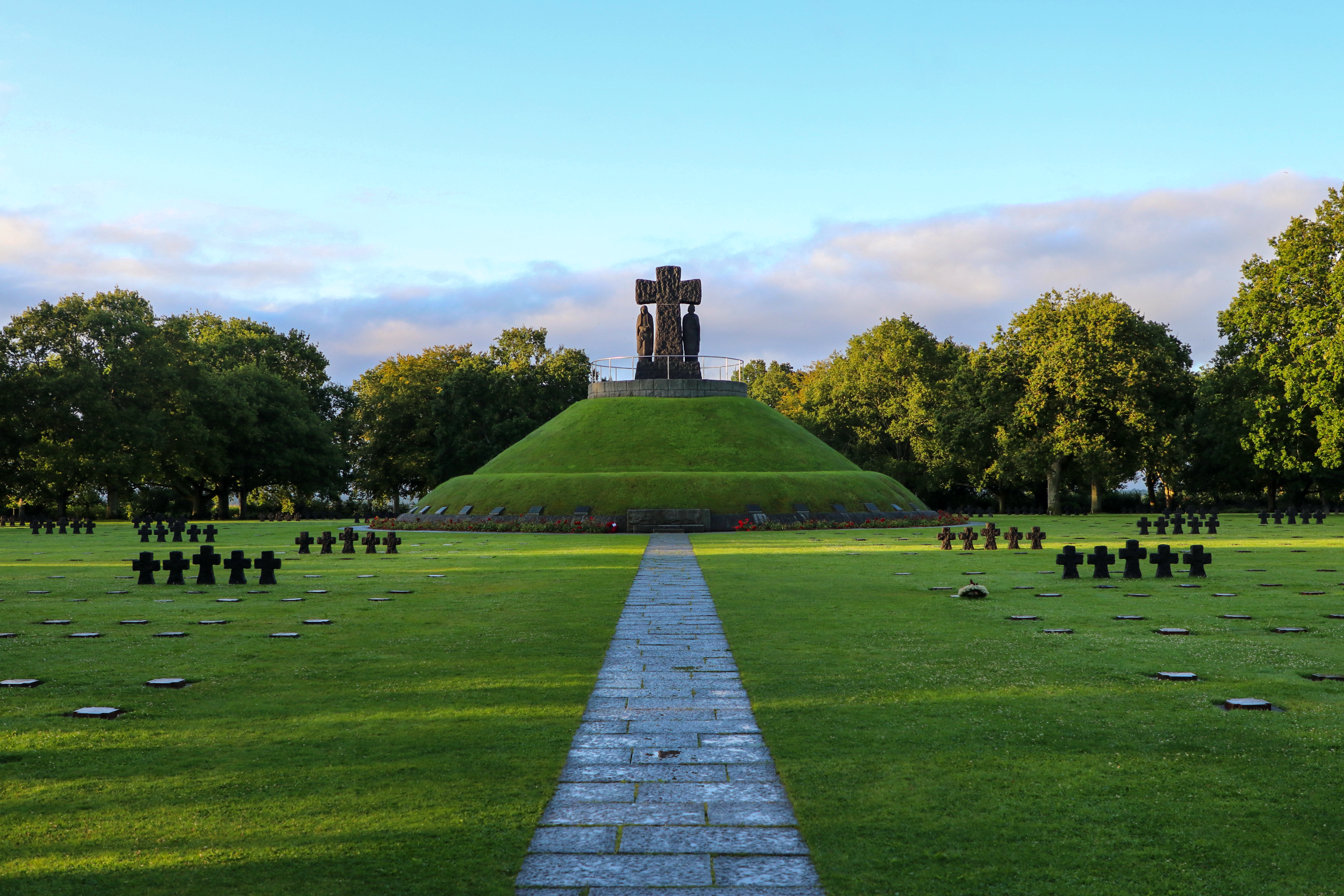
- The German military cemetery in La Cambe
- Used for those deceased 1944
- Established: 1944 (Finished 1961)
- Location: 49°20′31″N 01°01′35″W near Bayeux, Calvados, France
- Total burials: 21,222

Burials by nation
- Germany

Burials by war
- World War II

La Cambe is a Second World War German military war grave cemetery, located close to the American landing beach of Omaha, and 25.5 km (15.8 mi) north west of Bayeux in Normandy, France. It is the largest German war cemetery in Normandy and contains the remains of 21,222 German military personnel. Initially, American and German dead were buried in adjacent fields but American dead were later disinterred and either returned to the US or re-interred at the Normandy American Cemetery and Memorial, 15 km (9.3 mi) away. After the war over 12,000 German dead were moved from approximately 1,400 field burials across Normandy to La Cambe. The cemetery is maintained and managed by the voluntary German War Graves Commission (Volksbund Deutsche Kriegsgräberfürsorge).

== History ==
La Cambe was originally the site of a battlefield cemetery created on 10 June 1944 by the 607th Quartermaster Graves Registration Company during the Battle of Normandy. American and German soldiers, sailors and airmen were buried in two adjacent fields.

Following the end of the war in Europe in May 1945, the American Battle Monuments Commission began exhuming the remains of American servicemen and transferring them in accordance with the wishes of their families. Beginning in 1945, the Americans transferred two-thirds of their fallen from this site back to the United States while the remainder were re-interred at the new permanent American Cemetery and Memorial at Colleville-sur-Mer, which overlooks the Omaha Beach landing site.

Due to the rapid advance of the Allies during the latter stage of the Normandy campaign, German war dead were scattered over a wide area, many of them buried in isolated field graves or small battlefield cemeteries. In the years following the war, the German War Graves Commission (Volksbund Deutsche Kriegsgräberfürsorge) sought to establish six main German cemeteries in the Normandy area.

== Formation ==
La Cambe, as an existing site of German war dead with over 8,000 interments already informally cared for by the German War Graves Commission, was a natural choice for one of the six formal sites. After the signing in 1954 of the Franco-German Treaty on War Graves, La Cambe was formally cared for, allowing the remains of 12,000 German soldiers to be moved in from 1,400 locations in the French departments of Manche, Calvados and the Orne.

In 1954, the Franco-German War Graves Agreement ratified that the Reinterment Commission of the Volksbund could move German bodies from field graves and village cemeteries. During the removals many previously anonymous German soldiers were identified. In 1958, the youth section of the Volksbund drew people from seven nations to work on the cemetery. Layout and landscaping of the site began immediately after formal handover, with a large central tumulus (or kamaradengraben), flanked by two statues and topped by a large dark cross in basalt lava, which marks the resting place for 207 unknown and 89 identified German soldiers, interred together in a mass grave. The tumulus is surrounded by 49 rectangular grave fields with up to 400 graves each. On the large grass areas graves are identified by flat grave markers.

La Cambe was officially inaugurated as a war cemetery in September 1961 (along with the German cemeteries at Marigny, Orglandes and Saint-Désir-de-Lisieux). Special trains were organised to bring former comrades and family members to La Cambe. Since that date, the remains of more than 700 soldiers found on battlefields across Normandy have been re-interred at La Cambe.

The sign in front of the cemetery reads as follows:

The German Cemetery at La Cambe: In the Same Soil of France
Until 1947, this was an American cemetery. The remains were exhumed and shipped to the United States. It has been German since 1948, and contains over 21,000 graves. With its melancholy rigour, it is a graveyard for soldiers not all of whom had chosen either the cause or the fight. They too have found rest in our soil of France.

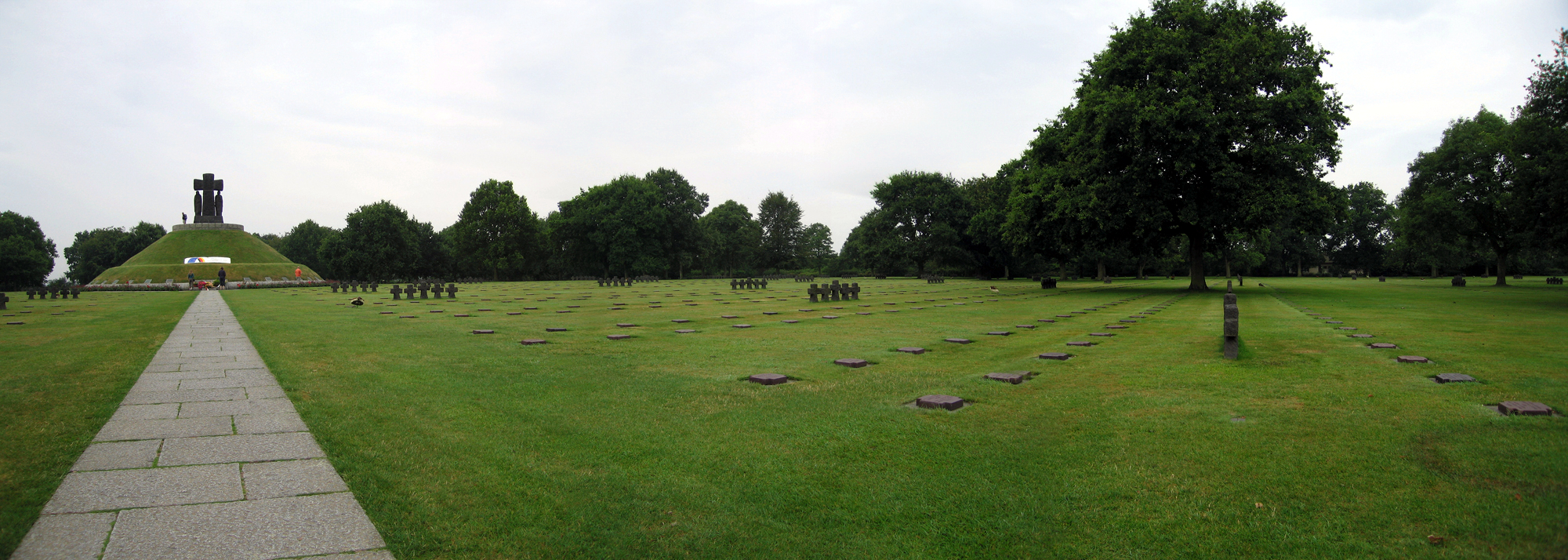
The German military cemetery in La Cambe

== Notable graves ==
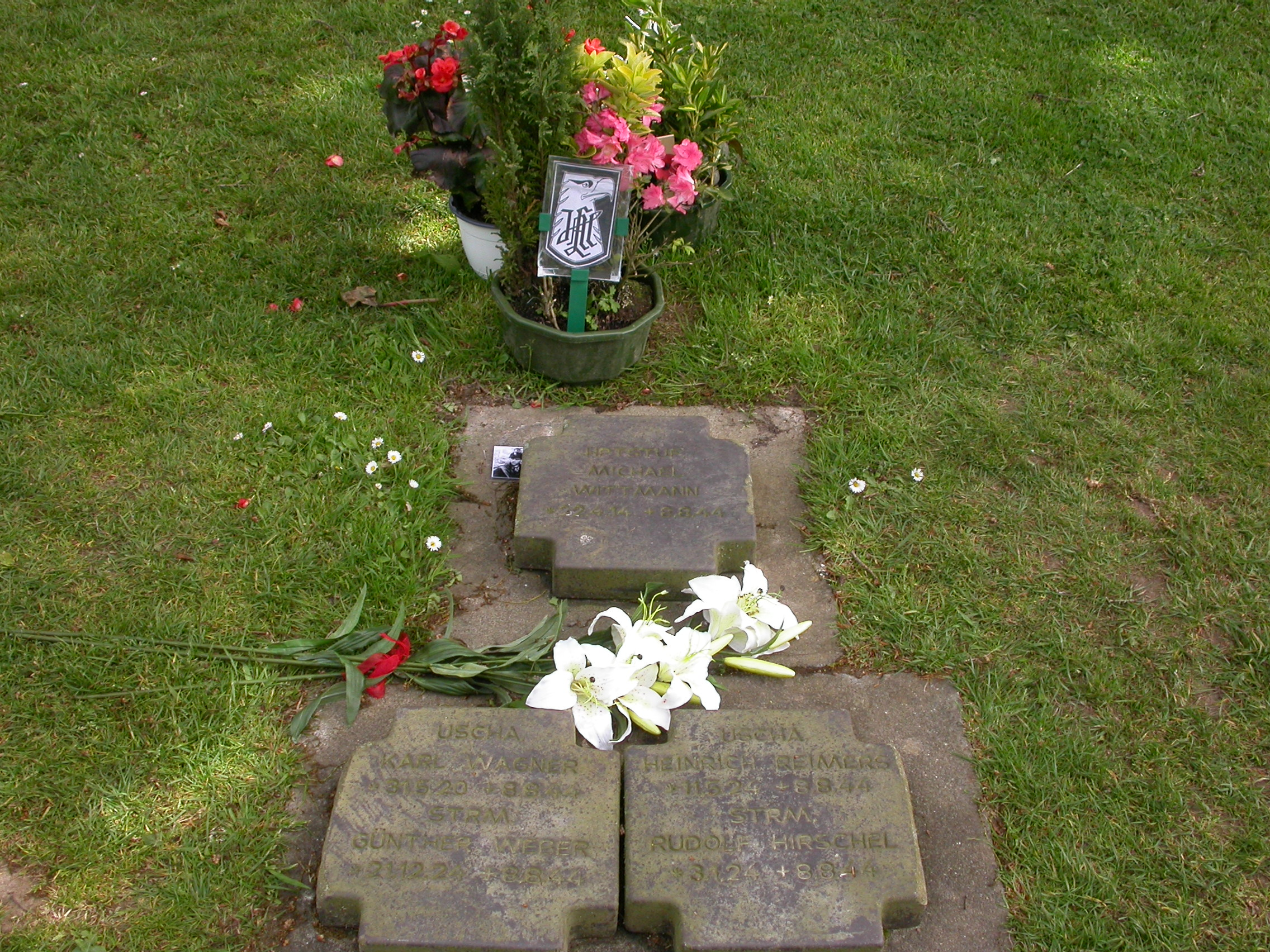
Grave of Michael Wittmann with the crew of Tiger 007, La Cambe Cemetery, France.

The majority of the German war dead buried at La Cambe fell between June 6 (D-Day landings) and August 20, 1944 (the end of the Battle of Normandy) and their ages range from 16 to 72. Casualties of the war in Normandy are still being found after some 75 years, although formal burial ceremonies are less frequent nowadays. In total, as of July 2008, there are the remains of 21,222 German soldiers, sailors and airmen buried at La Cambe. The buried include:

- Generalmajor Sigismund-Helmut von Dawans, killed in the RAF raid on the Panzergruppe West's GHQ.
- SS-Sturmbannführer Adolf Diekmann: the most senior officer at the massacre of Oradour-sur-Glane on 10 June 1944. Ordered to be court martialled, he was killed in battle in Normandy on 29 June.
- SS-Hauptsturmführer Michael Wittmann: Tiger tank ace, who along with his tank crew was informally buried in an unmarked site following their deaths on 8 August 1944. Rediscovered in 1983, the crew was re-interred at La Cambe.
- Hauptmann Herbert Huppertz, fighter pilot killed on 8 June 1944.
- Leutnant Anton-Rudolf Piffer, fighter pilot killed on 17 June 1944.

== Information Center ==
Since the mid-1990s, there has been an Information Center on the site. It commemorates the memory of the losses of Operation Overlord, when in summer 1944 more than 100,000 people died: American, British, German, French, Canadian, Poles and members of other nations. Also at least 14,000 French civilians died. Human fates and reconciliation are special themes. Visitors can also view a permanent exhibition about the German War Graves Commission and have access to a database to locate the graves of dead German soldiers. A peace-garden with 1,200 maple-trees from gifts symbolizes that peace ought to grow.

== Volunteer maintenance ==
Unlike the American and Commonwealth War Graves Commissions, the German Commission is entirely voluntary and relies on gifts and collections to further its work. During the summer months one may see international school children tending the graves. They volunteer to work with the Volksbund during their school holidays and visit American and German war cemeteries, memorials, sites of the invasion and take part in the memorial ceremony with veterans and the mayor of La Cambe.

== German cemeteries in Normandy ==
There are six German war cemeteries graveyards in Normandy with La Cambe being the largest:

- Champigny-St. André (19,836)
- Mont-de-Huisnes (11,956)
- Marigny (11,169)
- Orglandes (10,152)
- St. Désir-de-Lisieux (3,735)

== See also ==
- List of military cemeteries in Normandy
