= 387th Infantry Division =

- German: 387. Infanterie-Division
- Divisional insignia
- Active: 1942–1944
- Country: Nazi Germany
- Branch: Army
- Type: Infantry
- Size: Division
- Garrison/HQ: Munich
- Engagements: Second World War: Battle of Voronezh; Donbass Strategic Offensive; Nikopol–Krivoi Rog Offensive; Second Jassy–Kishinev Offensive

The 387th Infantry Division (German: 387. Infanterie-Division) was an infantry division of the German Army during the Second World War, active from 1942 to 1944. It saw active service on the Eastern Front and was destroyed in fighting in Romania in August 1944.

== Operational history ==
The 387th Infantry Division was formed in Austria on 1 February 1942 under the command of Generalleutnant (Note: In the Wehrmacht, the rank of generalleutnant is equivalent to that of major general in the United States Army.) Arno Jahr. The division nominally fell within the responsibility of Wehrkreis VII. At its core were three infantry regiments, one each from Stuttgart, Munich and Salzburg.

Dispatched to Russia, the division was soon engaged in the fighting in the southern area of the Eastern Front with Army Group South. From April to June 1942, prior to the commencement of Case Blue, it was active around Kursk. The division was then involved in the Battle of Voronezh. Attached to the Hungarian 2nd Army it fought in the battles around the Don Bend when the Soviet Army launched Operation Uranus and its subsequent offensives. It took extensive casualties over the period December 1942 to January 1943. The division's commander, Arno Jahr, was killed on 20 January 1943.

Withdrawn from the front lines in March 1943, it absorbed the survivors of the 385th Infantry Division. Eberhard von Schuckmann, formerly commander of the 385th Infantry Division, was now the divisional commander. Rebuilt to divisional strength, it returned to the Eastern Front in July to oppose the Soviet Army in the Donets. It then attempted to resist the Soviet advance of August-September 1943 to the south of Kharkov and at the end of the year was defending the Nikopol–Krivoi Rog Offensive. In February 1944, it was again withdrawn and downgraded to a battle group. It was attached to the 258th Infantry Division the following month.

The 387th Infantry Division was destroyed during fighting in Romania in August 1944; its divisional headquarters had been detached and transferred to the 98th Infantry Division a few months previously.

== Commanders ==
- Generalleutnant Arno Jahr (1 February 1942 – 20 January 1943);
- Oberst Kurt Gerok (21 January – 14 February 1943)
- Generalmajor (Note: The rank of generalmajor is equivalent to that of brigadier general in the United States Army.) Eberhard von Schuckmann (15 February – 5 May 1943; 10 July – 12 October 1943; 24 December 1943 – 15 June 1944);
- Generalmajor Erwin Menny (6 May – 9 July 1943);
- Oberst Werner Eichstadt (13 October – 23 December 1943).

== See also ==
- List of German divisions in World War II

== Notes ==
Footnotes

Citations
