= Clemens Betzel =

German general (1895–1945)

- Born: 9 June 1895
- Died: 27 March 1945 (aged 49); East Prussia
- Military career
- Allegiance: Nazi Germany
- Branch: Army
- Rank: Generalleutnant
- Commands: 4th Panzer Division
- Conflicts: First World War Second World War: Annexation of Austria; Annexation of the Sudetenland; German invasion of Poland; Battle of France; Eastern Front; Operation Barbarossa; Battle of Białystok–Minsk; Battle of Kiev (1941); Battle of Moscow; Battle of Kursk; Eastern Allied invasion of Germany; Lublin–Brest Offensive; Battle of Radzymin (1944); Courland Pocket; East Pomeranian Offensive †
- Awards: Knight's Cross of the Iron Cross with Oak Leaves

Clemens Betzel (9 June 1895 – 27 March 1945) was a German general in the Wehrmacht of Nazi Germany who commanded the 4. Panzer-Division during World War II. He was a recipient of the Kight's Cross of the Iron Cross with Oak Leaves. He died of a shell splinter during the East Pomeranian Offensive.

== Awards and decorations ==
- Clasp to the Iron Cross (1939) 2nd Class (24 September 1939) & 1st Class (10 October 1939)
- German Cross in Gold on 11 March 1943 as Oberst in Panzer-Artillerie-Regiment 103
- Knight's Cross of the Iron Cross with Oak Leaves
  - Knight's Cross on 5 September 1944 as Generalmajor and commander of 4. Panzer-Division
  - Oak Leaves on 11 March 1945 as Generalleutnant and commander of 4. Panzer-Division

Military offices
Preceded by General der Panzertruppe Dietrich von Saucken	Commander of 4. Panzer-Division; 1 May 1944 – 27 March 1945	Succeeded by Oberst Ernst-Wilhelm Hoffmann
