= 2nd Panzer Army =

Military unit of Nazi Germany

- 2. Panzerarmee
- Insignia
- Active: 5 June 1940 – 8 May 1945
- Country: Nazi Germany
- Branch: Army (Wehrmacht)
- Type: Panzer
- Role: Armoured warfare
- Size: Army
- Engagements: World War II; Eastern Front

Commanders
- Notable commanders: Heinz Guderian

The 2nd Panzer Army (German: 2. Panzerarmee) was a German armoured formation during World War II, formed from the 2nd Panzer Group on October 5, 1941.

== Organisation ==
Panzer Group Guderian (German: Panzergruppe Guderian) was formed on 5 June 1940 and named after its commander, general Heinz Guderian. In early June 1940, after reaching the English Channel following the breakthrough in the Ardennes, the Panzergruppe Guderian was formed from the XIX Army Corps, and thrust deep into France, cutting off the Maginot Line. In November 1940, it was upgraded into Panzergruppe 2.

The 2nd Panzer Group (German: Panzergruppe 2) was formed in November 1940 from Panzer Group Guderian. In October 1941 it was renamed the 2nd Panzer Army. Panzer Group 2 played a significant role in the early stages of the German invasion of the Soviet Union during Operation Barbarossa in 1941 when it was a constituent part of Army Group Centre.

== Operational history ==
2nd Panzer Group was part of the Army Group Centre during Operation Barbarossa, the invasion of the Soviet Union. Guderian's 2nd Panzer Army formed the Army Group's southern pincer while Hoth's 3rd Panzer Army formed the northern pincer destroying several Soviet armies during the opening phase of Operation Barbarossa. During the battles of Bialystok and Minsk, substantial numbers of prisoners were captured and several weapons captured.

Suffering heavy losses in men and equipment, the German forces advanced deeper into the Soviet Union. The rasputitsa season (literally "season of bad roads", due to heavy rains and sluggish muddy roads) began to slow down the formation's progress to a few kilometres a day. The rasputitsa was not an unusual phenomenon, but the Wehrmacht did not prepare for this contingency as the German high command had expected the German army to be in Moscow and beyond at this time, with the campaign over before the end of summer. After Minsk, the 2nd and 3rd Panzer Armies captured Smolensk in another successful pincer operation taking around 300,000 prisoners.

Hitler ordered Army Group Center to detach the 2nd Panzer Group, turning southward towards Kiev to form the northern pincer at Kiev. Guderian's 2nd Panzer Army and Kleist's 1st Panzer Army were locked in a pincer around Kiev to trap 665,000 Soviet prisoners. After concluding the Kiev encirclement, the German planned for the three Panzer armies to attack Moscow from different directions:

4th Panzer Army in the North around Leningrad would attack southward. Hoth's 3rd Panzer Army would attack eastward towards Moscow, while the 2nd Panzer Army would turn northwest and attack Moscow from the south. Guderian's forces tried to encircle the 50th Army, which was successfully defending Tula. After unsuccessful attempts to capture Tula, the high command ordered Guderian to bypass Tula on November 18 and head towards the vital town of Kashira. The furthest attack was stopped near Kashira by the 1st Guards Cavalry Corps, 173rd Rifle Division, and other units that withstood the central attack of the Guderian army.

The Group's divisions had suffered heavy attrition since the beginning of the invasion and experienced shortages in fuel and ammunition due to the breakdown in logistics. By November, the situation of Guderian's Panzer Group was dire. Nonetheless, Guderian expected the Red Army's resistance to collapse and, driven by National Socialist military thinking, including the idea that the "will" was key to success, continued to direct his forces to attack.

By early December, the final advance on Moscow failed in the face of stiffening Soviet resistance and due to shortages in men and equipment. Until the Soviet counter-offensive, the Germans enjoyed substantial domination of the skies and numerical advantage in material and men power during the Battle of Moscow. The massive and unexpected counter-attacks of 1st Guards Cavalry Corps, 50th Army, 10th Army, and parts of 49th Army drove the Germans the furthest from the capital, thus resulting in Hitler's dismissal of Heinz Guderian. After the battle, he would never again reach the height and the popularity with Hitler or command any significant part of the German forces.

In August 1943, the 2nd Panzer Army was transferred to occupied Yugoslavia, where it was incorporated into Army Group F and engaged in anti-partisan operations against the Chetniks under Draža Mihailović and the communist Yugoslav Partisans under Josip Broz Tito. Despite engaging in several operations aimed to crush the partisan movement, particularly the communists, no clear victory was gained. Indeed, the partisan movement grew in size and equipment, particularly after Italy signed the Armistice of Cassibile on 8 September 1943, which led to Italian units in occupied Bosnia and Montenegro either surrendering or defecting to the partisans.

Throughout 1943-44, the 2nd Panzer Army was progressively stripped of its heavy armor destined for the war on the Eastern Front, and became a primarily motorized infantry force. It did gain specialized Alpine support from units like the Brandenburgers and 7th SS Volunteer Mountain Division Prinz Eugen divisions. However, endemic guerilla warfare cost the 2nd Panzer Army heavily, and only months after the Raid on Drvar (Operation Rösselsprung) failed to assassinate the communist partisan leadership via airborne assault, the 2nd Panzer Army and all of Army Group F were pushed out of Belgrade in a joint operation by the Partisans and Red Army during the Belgrade Offensive. The 2nd Panzer Army finished the war in disarray in modern Austria.

== War crimes ==
As all German armies on the Eastern Front, Panzer Group 2 implemented the criminal Commissar Order during Operation Barbarossa. In September 1942, the 2nd Panzer Army took part in war crimes while conducting anti-guerrilla operations in the Soviet Union. These operations killed at least a thousand people, razed entire villages, and deported over 18,500. During these operations, Jews and suspected partisans were murdered by being forced to drag ploughs through minefields.

In August 1943, the army's headquarters was subordinated to Army Group F and transferred to the Balkans for anti-partisan operations. The army became primarily an infantry formation at this point and found itself committed to anti-partisan operations, and personnel were accused postwar of multiple atrocities against civilians and partisans.

After the Belgrade Offensive overtook army headquarters, surviving units of the 2nd Panzer Army were subsequently transferred to Hungary as part of Army Group South in January 1945, holding off the Soviet invasion of Austria. 2nd Panzer Army took part in the Battle of the Transdanubian Hills in March 1945 before surrendering at the end of the war to both Soviet and Anglo-American forces.

== Commanders ==
No.	Portrait	Commander	Took office	Left office	Time in office
1	Heinz Guderian	Generaloberst; Heinz Guderian (1888–1954)	5 June 1940	25 December 1941	1 year, 203 days
2	Rudolf Schmidt	Generaloberst; Rudolf Schmidt (1886–1957)	25 December 1941	10 April 1943	1 year, 106 days
3	Erich Clößner	General der Infanterie; Erich Clößner (1888–1976)	25 April 1943	3 August 1943	114 days
4	Walter Model	Generalfeldmarschall; Walter Model (1891–1945)	6 August 1943	14 August 1943	8 days
5	Lothar Rendulic	Generaloberst; Lothar Rendulic (1887–1971)	14 August 1943	24 June 1944	315 days
6	Franz Böhme	General der Infanterie; Franz Böhme (1885–1947)	24 June 1944	17 July 1944	23 days
7	Maximilian de Angelis	General der Artillerie; Maximilian de Angelis (1889–1974)	18 July 1944	8 May 1945	294 days

=== Order of battle ===
Organization of Panzer Group Guderian on 28 May 1940

Group	Corps	Division
Panzer Group Guderian; General der Panzertruppe Heinz Guderian	XXXIX Army Corps (mot.); Generalleutnant Rudolf Schmidt	1st Panzer Division; Generalleutnant Friedrich Kirchner
Panzer Group Guderian; General der Panzertruppe Heinz Guderian	XXXIX Army Corps (mot.); Generalleutnant Rudolf Schmidt	2nd Panzer Division; Generalleutnant Rudolf Veiel
Panzer Group Guderian; General der Panzertruppe Heinz Guderian	XXXIX Army Corps (mot.); Generalleutnant Rudolf Schmidt	29th Infantry Division (mot.); Generalmajor Willibald Freiherr von Langermann und Erlencamp
Panzer Group Guderian; General der Panzertruppe Heinz Guderian	XXXXI Army Corps (mot.); Generalleutnant Georg-Hans Reinhardt	6th Panzer Division; Generalmajor Werner Kempf
Panzer Group Guderian; General der Panzertruppe Heinz Guderian	XXXXI Army Corps (mot.); Generalleutnant Georg-Hans Reinhardt	8th Panzer Division; Generalleutnant Adolf-Friedrich Kuntzen
Panzer Group Guderian; General der Panzertruppe Heinz Guderian	XXXXI Army Corps (mot.); Generalleutnant Georg-Hans Reinhardt	20th Infantry Division (mot.); Generalleutnant Mauritz von Wiktorin

==== June 22, 1941 ====
Group	Corps	Division / Regiment
2nd Panzer Group; Generaloberst; Heinz Guderian	XXIV Panzer Corps	3rd Panzer Division
2nd Panzer Group; Generaloberst; Heinz Guderian	XXIV Panzer Corps	4th Panzer Division
2nd Panzer Group; Generaloberst; Heinz Guderian	XXIV Panzer Corps	10th Infantry Division
2nd Panzer Group; Generaloberst; Heinz Guderian	XXIV Panzer Corps	1st Cavalry Division
2nd Panzer Group; Generaloberst; Heinz Guderian	XLVI Panzer Corps	10th Panzer Division
2nd Panzer Group; Generaloberst; Heinz Guderian	XLVI Panzer Corps	SS Infantry Division Das Reich (mot.)
2nd Panzer Group; Generaloberst; Heinz Guderian	XLVI Panzer Corps	Infantry Regiment Großdeutschland
2nd Panzer Group; Generaloberst; Heinz Guderian	XLVII Panzer Corps	17th Panzer Division
2nd Panzer Group; Generaloberst; Heinz Guderian	XLVII Panzer Corps	18th Panzer Division
2nd Panzer Group; Generaloberst; Heinz Guderian	XLVII Panzer Corps	29th Infantry Division (mot.)
2nd Panzer Group; Generaloberst; Heinz Guderian	XLVII Panzer Corps	Anti-Aircraft Regiment Hermann Göring

==== July 27, 1941 ====
Group	Corps	Division / Regiment
2nd Panzer Group Generaloberst; Heinz Guderian	VII Corps	7th Infantry Division
2nd Panzer Group Generaloberst; Heinz Guderian	VII Corps	23rd Infantry Division
2nd Panzer Group Generaloberst; Heinz Guderian	VII Corps	78th Infantry Division
2nd Panzer Group Generaloberst; Heinz Guderian	VII Corps	197th Infantry Division
2nd Panzer Group Generaloberst; Heinz Guderian	XX Corps	15th Infantry Division
2nd Panzer Group Generaloberst; Heinz Guderian	XX Corps	268th Infantry Division
2nd Panzer Group Generaloberst; Heinz Guderian	IX Corps	263rd Infantry Division
2nd Panzer Group Generaloberst; Heinz Guderian	IX Corps	292nd Infantry Division
2nd Panzer Group Generaloberst; Heinz Guderian	IX Corps	137th Infantry Division
2nd Panzer Group Generaloberst; Heinz Guderian	XLVI Panzer Corps	10th Panzer Division
2nd Panzer Group Generaloberst; Heinz Guderian	XLVI Panzer Corps	SS Infantry Division Das Reich (mot.)
2nd Panzer Group Generaloberst; Heinz Guderian	XLVI Panzer Corps	Infantry Regiment Großdeutschland
2nd Panzer Group Generaloberst; Heinz Guderian	XXIV Panzer Corps	3rd Panzer Division
2nd Panzer Group Generaloberst; Heinz Guderian	XXIV Panzer Corps	4th Panzer Division
2nd Panzer Group Generaloberst; Heinz Guderian	XXIV Panzer Corps	10th Infantry Division (mot.)
2nd Panzer Group Generaloberst; Heinz Guderian	XLVII Panzer Corps	18th Panzer Division
2nd Panzer Group Generaloberst; Heinz Guderian	XLVII Panzer Corps	17th Panzer Division
2nd Panzer Group Generaloberst; Heinz Guderian	XLVII Panzer Corps	29th Infantry Division (mot.)

==== September 30, 1941 ====
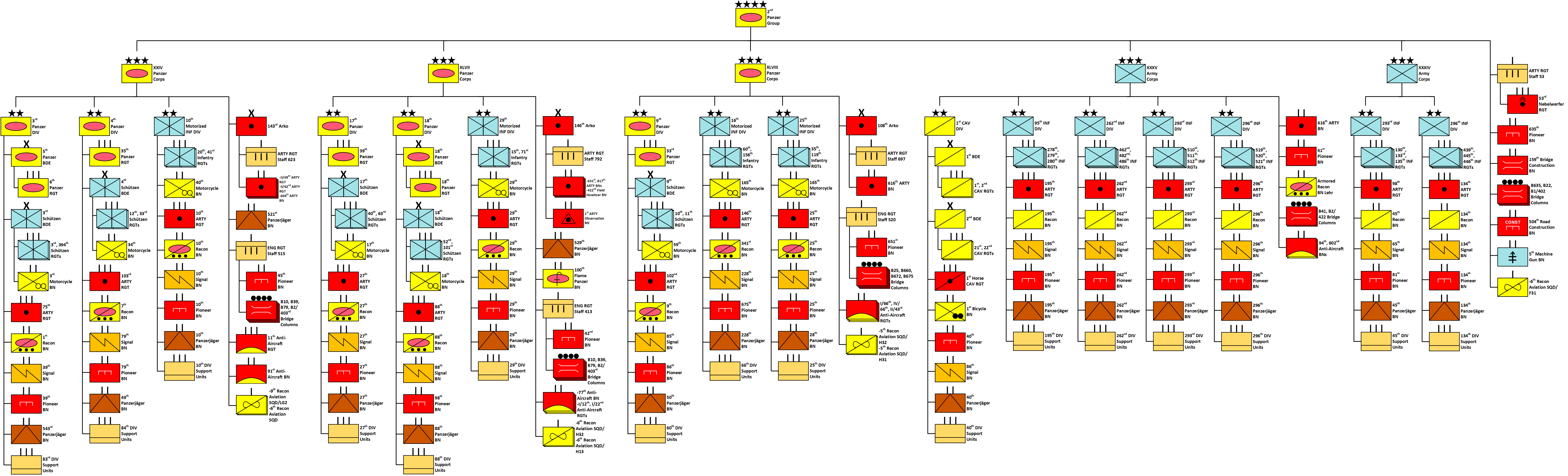
Organization of the 2nd Panzer Group at the start of Operation Typhoon 27 September 1941

Group	Corps	Division / Regiment
2nd Panzer Group; Generaloberst; Heinz Guderian	XLVIII Panzer Corps	9th Panzer Division
2nd Panzer Group; Generaloberst; Heinz Guderian	XLVIII Panzer Corps	16th Infantry Division (mot.)
2nd Panzer Group; Generaloberst; Heinz Guderian	XLVIII Panzer Corps	25th Infantry Division (mot.)
2nd Panzer Group; Generaloberst; Heinz Guderian	XXIV Panzer Corps	3rd Panzer Division
2nd Panzer Group; Generaloberst; Heinz Guderian	XXIV Panzer Corps	4th Panzer Division
2nd Panzer Group; Generaloberst; Heinz Guderian	XXIV Panzer Corps	10th Infantry Division (mot.)
2nd Panzer Group; Generaloberst; Heinz Guderian	XLVII Panzer Corps	17th Panzer Division
2nd Panzer Group; Generaloberst; Heinz Guderian	XLVII Panzer Corps	18th Panzer Division
2nd Panzer Group; Generaloberst; Heinz Guderian	XLVII Panzer Corps	20th Infantry Division (mot.)
2nd Panzer Group; Generaloberst; Heinz Guderian	XXXIV Corps	45th Infantry Division
2nd Panzer Group; Generaloberst; Heinz Guderian	XXXIV Corps	134th Infantry Division
2nd Panzer Group; Generaloberst; Heinz Guderian	XXXV Corps	296th Infantry Division
2nd Panzer Group; Generaloberst; Heinz Guderian	XXXV Corps	95th Infantry Division
2nd Panzer Group; Generaloberst; Heinz Guderian	XXXV Corps	1st Cavalry Division

==== November 30, 1943 ====
Group	Corps	Division / Regiment
2nd Panzer Army; Generaloberst; Lothar Rendulic	III SS Panzer Corps	11th SS Panzergrenadier Division Nordland
2nd Panzer Army; Generaloberst; Lothar Rendulic	III SS Panzer Corps	SS Panzer Grenadier Brigade Nederland
2nd Panzer Army; Generaloberst; Lothar Rendulic	V SS Mountain Corps	7th SS Division Prinz Eugen
2nd Panzer Army; Generaloberst; Lothar Rendulic	V SS Mountain Corps	118th Jäger Division
2nd Panzer Army; Generaloberst; Lothar Rendulic	V SS Mountain Corps	181st Infantry Division
2nd Panzer Army; Generaloberst; Lothar Rendulic	V SS Mountain Corps	369th (Croatian) Infantry Division
2nd Panzer Army; Generaloberst; Lothar Rendulic	V SS Mountain Corps	1st Mountain Division
2nd Panzer Army; Generaloberst; Lothar Rendulic	XV Mountain Corps	1st Cossack Division
2nd Panzer Army; Generaloberst; Lothar Rendulic	XV Mountain Corps	114th Jäger Division
2nd Panzer Army; Generaloberst; Lothar Rendulic	XV Mountain Corps	264th Infantry Division
2nd Panzer Army; Generaloberst; Lothar Rendulic	XV Mountain Corps	371st Infantry Division
2nd Panzer Army; Generaloberst; Lothar Rendulic	XV Mountain Corps	373rd (Croatian) Infantry Division
2nd Panzer Army; Generaloberst; Lothar Rendulic	XXI Mountain Corps	100th Jäger Division
2nd Panzer Army; Generaloberst; Lothar Rendulic	XXI Mountain Corps	297th Infantry Division
2nd Panzer Army; Generaloberst; Lothar Rendulic	LXIX Reserve Corps	173rd Reserve Division
2nd Panzer Army; Generaloberst; Lothar Rendulic	LXIX Reserve Corps	187th Reserve Division
2nd Panzer Army; Generaloberst; Lothar Rendulic	367th Infantry Division	

== Sources ==
- Stahel, David (2015). The Battle for Moscow. Cambridge, UK: Cambridge University Press. ISBN 978-1-107-08760-6.
