= Wolf-Dietrich von Xylander =

- Born: 9 April 1903; Munich, Kingdom of Bavaria, German Empire
- Died: 15 February 1945 (aged 41); Struppen, Saxony, Nazi Germany
- Military career
- Allegiance: Weimar Republic; Nazi Germany
- Branch: German Army
- Service years: 1921–1945
- Rank: Generalleutnant
- Unit: Army Group Centre
- Conflicts: World War II; Battle of France; Eastern Front
- Awards: Knight's Cross of the Iron Cross

Wolf-Dietrich von Xylander (9 April 1903 – 15 February 1945) was a German general during World War II. He was a recipient of the Knight's Cross of the Iron Cross of Nazi Germany. Xylander was killed on 15 February 1945 in an airplane crash near Struppen, Germany. He was posthumously awarded the Knight's Cross on 20 February 1945.

== Awards and decorations ==
- Knight's Cross of the Iron Cross on 20 February 1945 as Generalleutnant and Chief of the Generalstab of HeeresGruppe Mitte

Military offices
Preceded by Generalleutnant Otto Heidkämper	Chief of the General Staff of Army Group Center; January 1945 - 15 February 1945	Succeeded by Generalleutnant Oldwig von Natzmer
