= Oldwig von Natzmer =

German general and Knight's Cross recipient (1904–1980)

Oldwig Otto von Natzmer
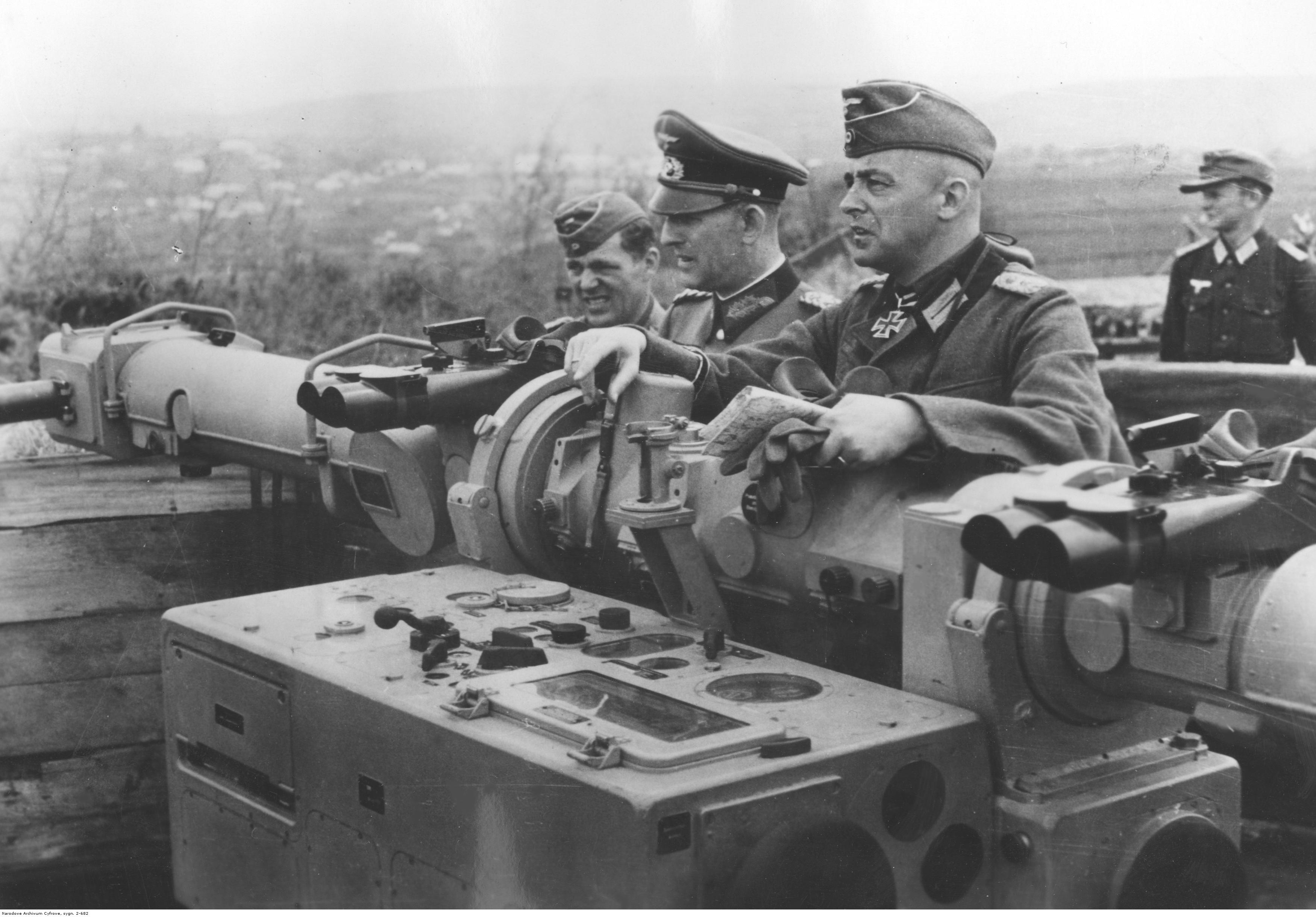
- Oldwig von Natzmer (3rd from left) in 1944 on the Eastern Front, to his left Rudolf Schmundt
- Born: 29 June 1904
- Died: 1 April 1980 (aged 75)
- Military career
- Allegiance: Nazi Germany
- Branch: Army
- Service years: 1925–1945
- Rank: Generalleutnant
- Units: Großdeutschland Division; Army Group North; Army Group Centre
- Conflicts: World War II
- Awards: Knight's Cross of the Iron Cross

Oldwig Otto Wilhelm Gneomar von Natzmer (29 June 1904 – 1 April 1980) was a German general during World War II. He was a recipient of the Knight's Cross of the Iron Cross of Nazi Germany.

== Awards and decorations ==
- Wehrmacht Long Service Award, 4th and 3rd Class
- Iron Cross (1939), 2nd and 1st Class
- Panzer Badge
- Golden HJ Honour Badge
- Eastern Front Medal
- German Cross in Gold (2 April 1943)
- Knight's Cross of the Iron Cross on 4 September 1943 as Oberst im Generalstab and Ia (operations officer) in the Panzergrenadier-Division "Großdeutschland"

Military offices
Preceded by Generalleutnant Eberhard Kinzel	Chief of the General Staff of Heeresgruppe Nord; 19 July 1944 - January 1945	Succeeded by Redesignated Heeresgruppe Kurland
Preceded by Generalleutnant Wolf-Dietrich Ritter und Edler von Xylander	Chief of the General Staff of HeeresGruppe Mitte; 17 February 1945 - 8 May 1945	Succeeded by None
