= Erich Schneider =

- Born: 12 August 1894
- Died: 3 August 1980 (aged 85)
- Military career
- Allegiance: Nazi Germany
- Branch: Army (Wehrmacht)
- Rank: Generalleutnant
- Commands: 4th Panzer Division; 14th Infantry Division
- Conflicts: World War II
- Awards: Knight's Cross of the Iron Cross with Oak Leaves

Erich Schneider (12 August 1894 – 3 August 1980) was a general in the Wehrmacht of Nazi Germany during World War II. He was a recipient of the Knight's Cross of the Iron Cross with Oak Leaves.

== Awards and decorations ==
- Iron Cross (1914) 2nd Class (22 September 1915) & 1st Class (26 October 1916)
- Clasp to the Iron Cross (1939) 2nd Class (24 June 1941) & 1st Class (16 July 1941)
- Knight's Cross of the Iron Cross with Oak Leaves
  - Knight's Cross on 5 May 1943 as Generalmajor and commander of the 4. Panzer-Division
  - Oak Leaves on 6 March 1945 as Generalleutnant and commander of 14. Infanterie-Division

Military offices
Preceded by General der Panzertruppe Heinrich Eberbach	Commander of 4. Panzer-Division; 14 November 1942 – 31 May 1943	Succeeded by General der Panzertruppe Dietrich von Saucken
Preceded by Generalleutnant Hermann Flörke	Commander of 14. Infanterie-Division; 28 December 1944 – 20 March 1945	Succeeded by Generalmajor Paul von Below
