= Anton-Rudolf Piffer =

Austrian Luftwaffe fighter pilot and Knight's Cross recipient (1918–1944)

- Born: 16 May 1918; Zirl in Tirol, Austria
- Died: 17 June 1944 (aged 26); La Cordonnière, France
- Cause of death: Killed in action
- Burial place: La Cambe German war cemetery
- Military career
- Allegiance: Nazi Germany
- Branch: Luftwaffe
- Service years: 1938–1944
- Rank: Leutnant (second lieutenant)
- Nickname: Toni
- Unit: JG 1
- Commands: 1./JG 1
- Conflicts: World War II
- Awards: Knight's Cross of the Iron Cross

Anton-Rudolf "Toni" Piffer (16 May 1918 – 17 June 1944) was a Luftwaffe flying ace of World War II. Piffer was credited with 35 victories. All his victories were recorded over the Western Front. These included 26 four-engine bombers, all of which he obtained during Defence of the Reich operations.

== Early life ==
Piffer was born 16 May 1918 in Zirl within the state Tirol, then part of the Austro-Hungarian Empire. Following the Anschluss, the annexation of the Federal State of Austria into Nazi Germany, he volunteered for military service in the Luftwaffe in 1938. After completing his flight and fighter pilot training, (Note: Flight training in the Luftwaffe progressed through the levels A1, A2 and B1, B2, referred to as A/B flight training. A training included theoretical and practical training in aerobatics, navigation, long-distance flights and dead-stick landings. The B courses included high-altitude flights, instrument flights, night landings, and training to handle the aircraft in difficult situations.) Piffer was posted to 11. Staffel (11th squadron) of Jagdgeschwader 1 (JG 1—1st Fighter Wing) on 3 April 1942, then based in the Netherlands.

== World War II ==
Piloting an Focke-Wulf Fw 190, Piffer claimed his first areal victory on 19 September 1942, shooting down a Royal Air Force (RAF) Mosquito Mk.VI bomber from the 105th Squadron near Osnabrück.

On 1 April 1943, Piffer's squadron was redesignated to the 2. Staffel of I. Gruppe of Jagdgeschwader 1 (2./JG 1), with Piffer being now based out of Deelen. He then shot down what he reported to be a Short Stirling on 15 May 1943, although it has been proposed that it was more likely a United States Army Air Forces (USAAF) four-engine bomber. By the end of May, Piffer's Gruppe had been moved to operate out of Schiphol. On 22 June 22, Piffer claimed another victory over a B-17 near Dinslaken, and was subsequently awarded the Iron Cross first class. Piffer claimed another victory on 30 July. In August, he was promoted to Oberfeldwebel and claimed another B-17 during the Schweinfurt–Regensburg mission. He would claim four more in October; one on 4 October, another on 8 October, southwest of Bremen, and another on 10 October, and one more on 14 October, before being wounded on 18 October when his Fw 190 A-6 suffered engine failure and he had to conduct an emergency landing near Terwolde. He recovered quickly, claiming two more aerial victories before again being wounded in combat with USAAF bomber escorts on 11 November 1943 near Deelen. In December 1943, he claimed a total of four bombers while based out of Dortmund-Brackel Airbase. On 16 December, he claimed two of those B-17s. He then guided fellow ace Rudolf Engleder through a blind landing, after he had been wounded and temporarily lost vision. Then, on 22 December, Piffer shot down a P-38 By the end of 1943, Piffer had added 17 victories to his tally, 13 of which being B-17s.

Piffer shot down a B-17 5 January 1944 around Düsseldorf. On 30 January 1944, Piffer claimed another two B-17s shot down on the day. He has also had a P-38 victory that has been attributed to him in that month. Piffer was creditted with shooting down yet another B-17 8 February 1944. His gruppe then moved to be based out of Dortmund. On 24 February 1944, Oberfeldwebel Piffer shot down a B-24 Liberator from the 2nd Bombardment Division over Diepholz. On 8 April 1944, Piffer shot down another B-24 bomber near Salzwedel but was shot down himself in his Fw 190 A-8 "Black 3". Forced to bail out 20 kilometers (12 miles) west of Salzwedel, he was again wounded.

=== Squadron leader and death ===
Piffer was promoted to the rank of Leutnant (second lieutenant) and appointed Staffelkapitän (squadron leader) of 1./JG 1 on 1 May 1944, succeeding Leutnant Heinz-Günther Lück. He claimed a P-51 on May 8. On May 12, Piffer shot down a P-47 Thunderbolt near Lübeck, before on May 13 being rammed by another and making an emergency landing without landing gear near Hamburg. While the more common account lists Piffer as being rammed by the Thunderbolt, another claims he rammed the plane, which fell into the Baltic Sea. Piffer is then credited with shooting down another B-17 on May 24. Piffer is credited with aerial victories over a B-17 on May 28 near Magdeburg and another B-17 May 29th near Berlin.

His squadron moved to France on 6 June due to the incoming Allied advance, where he claimed a Taylorcraft Auster near Saint-Lô on 15 June. On 16 June, Piffer shot down two RAF Supermarine Spitfire fighters near Flers, Normandy.

On 17 June 1944, Piffer was killed when his Fw 190 A-8 (Werknummer 172604) was shot down in aerial combat with either P-51 or P-47 fighters of the 354th Fighter Group near La Cordonnière, located approximately 10 kilometers (6.2 miles) northeast of Vire. Piffer was replaced by Leutnant Siegfried Stoffel, killed in action six days later, as commander of 1. Staffel.

He was posthumously awarded the Knight's Cross of the Iron Cross (Ritterkreuz des Eisernen Kreuzes) on 20 October 1944. Piffer is buried in La Cambe German war cemetery.

== Summary of career ==
=== Aerial victory claims ===
According to Forsyth, Piffer was credited with 35 aerial victories, including 26 heavy bombers. Obermaier lists him with 26 aerial victories, including 19 heavy bombers claimed in an unknown number of combat missions. Mathews and Foreman, authors of Luftwaffe Aces — Biographies and Victory Claims, researched the German Federal Archives and found records for 29 aerial victory claims, plus one further unconfirmed claim. All of these aerial victories were claimed over the Western Allies and include 21 heavy bombers.

Victory claims were logged to a map-reference (PQ = Planquadrat), for example "PQ 05 Ost 7349". The Luftwaffe grid map (Jägermeldenetz) covered all of Europe, western Russia and North Africa and was composed of rectangles measuring 15 minutes of latitude by 30 minutes of longitude, an area of about 360 square miles (930 km^{2}). These sectors were then subdivided into 36 smaller units to give a location area 3 km × 4 km (1.9 mi × 2.5 mi) in size.

Chronicle of aerial victories
This and the – (dash) indicates unconfirmed aerial victory claims for which Piffer did not receive credit. This along with the * (asterisk) indicates an Herausschuss (separation shot)—a severely damaged heavy bomber forced to separate from his combat box which was counted as an aerial victory.
Claim	Date	Time	Type	Location	Claim	Date	Time	Type	Location
– 11. Staffel of Jagdgeschwader 1 – Defense of the Reich — April – 31 December 1943
1	19 September 1942	14:41	Mosquito	PQ 05 Ost 7349, Osnabrück					
– 2. Staffel of Jagdgeschwader 1 – Defense of the Reich — 1 January – 31 December 1943
2	15 May 1943	11:40	Stirling	PQ 05 Ost 6565	—	14 October 1943	—	B-17	
3	22 June 1943	09:48	B-17	PQ 05 Ost S/KO-3	—	11 November 1943	—	B-17	
4	30 July 1943	10:25	P-47	PQ 05 Ost S/JJ-6/9	—	11 November 1943	—	B-17	
5	17 August 1943	12:30	B-17	PQ 05 Ost S/SU-4	8	26 November 1943	11:56	B-17	PQ 05 Ost S/DS-9/9, southeast of Bremen
6	4 October 1943	11:40	B-17*	PQ 05 Ost S/TO-8	9	16 December 1943	14:15	B-17	PQ 05 Ost S/DL
—	8 October 1943	—	B-17		—	16 December 1943	—	B-17	
7	9 October 1943	12:50	B-17	PQ 05 Ost S/AS-5/6	10	20 December 1943	13:00	B-17	PQ 05 Ost S/ES
—	10 October 1943	—	B-17		11	22 December 1943	14:09	P-38	PQ 05 Ost S/FO
– 2. Staffel of Jagdgeschwader 1 – Defense of the Reich — 1 January – 30 April 1944
12	5 January 1944	—	B-17		16	8 February 1944	12:17	B-17	
13	30 January 1944	12:02	B-17	PQ 15 Ost S/GB-HB	17	8 April 1944	13:56	B-24	PQ 15 Ost S/EB-9
14	30 January 1944	12:05	B-17	PQ 15 Ost S/GB-HB	18	24 April 1944	15:12	B-17	PQ 05 Ost S/SQ
15	31 January 1944	16:30	P-38	IJsselstein	19	29 April 1944	10:58	B-17*	PQ 15 Ost S/HC
– 1. Staffel of Jagdgeschwader 1 – Defense of the Reich — 1 May – 5 June 1944
20	8 May 1944	09:56	P-51	PQ 15 Ost S/FA-1	23	24 May 1944	11:01	B-17*	PQ 15 Ost S/CH-CJ-DH-DJ
21	12 May 1944	15:00	B-24	PQ 05 Ost S/OS	24	28 May 1944	14:06	B-17	PQ 15 Ost S/HC-HD
22	13 May 1944	13:41	P-47	PQ 15 Ost S/UB-UD-UC	25	29 May 1944	12:39	B-17	PQ 15 Ost S/JG
– 1. Staffel of Jagdgeschwader 1 – In defense of the Invasion — 6–17 June 1944
26	15 June 1944	15:41	Auster	PQ 15 West UT, north of Saint-Lô	28	16 June 1944	21:30	Spitfire	PQ 14 West AT/AU, vicinity of Flers
27	16 June 1944	21:25	Spitfire	PQ 14 West AT/AU, vicinity of Flers					

=== Awards ===
- Iron Cross (1939) 2nd and 1st Class
- Honor Goblet of the Luftwaffe on 24 April 1944 as Oberfeldwebel and pilot
- Knight's Cross of the Iron Cross on 20 October 1944 as Oberfeldwebel and Staffelführer of the 2./Jagdgeschwader 1 "Oesau" (Note: According to Scherzer as Leutnant (war officer) who received the Knight's Cross of the Iron Cross as Staffelführer of the 2./Jagdgeschwader 1 "Oesau".)
