= Leo Geyr von Schweppenburg =

German general (1886–1974)

Leo Reichsfreiherr Geyr von Schweppenburg
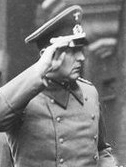
- Geyr in 1935
- Born: Leo Dietrich Franz Reichsfreiherr Geyr von Schweppenburg; 2 March 1886; Potsdam, Germany
- Died: 27 January 1974 (aged 87); Irschenhausen, West Germany
- Military career
- Allegiance: German Empire; Weimar Republic; Nazi Germany
- Branch: Imperial German Army; Reichswehr; German Army
- Service years: 1904–1945
- Rank: General der Panzertruppe
- Commands: 3rd Panzer Division; XXIV Army Corps; XXXX Panzer Corps; LVIII Panzer Corps; 5th Panzer Army
- Conflicts: World War I; World War II
- Awards: Knight's Cross of the Iron Cross

Leo Dietrich Franz Reichsfreiherr Geyr von Schweppenburg (2 March 1886 – 27 January 1974) was a German general in the Wehrmacht during World War II, noted for his pioneering stance and expertise in the field of armoured warfare. He commanded the 5th Panzer Army (formalised as Panzer Group West) during the Invasion of Normandy, and later served as Inspector General of Armoured Troops. After the war he was involved in the development of the newly built German Army (Bundeswehr).

== Early life and career ==
Freiherr von Geyr was born 1886 in Potsdam into the Prussian military aristocracy and descended from a family that produced two Prussian Field Marshals. His father was the retired colonel Karl Geyr von Schweppenburg (1840–1913), a close friend and chief stable master of William II of Württemberg. His mother, Elisabeth Karoline von Hülsen-Haeseler (1855–1887), was the daughter of Botho von Hülsen. He joined the German Army in 1904. In World War I he fought on several fronts and rose to the rank of captain. After the war, he remained in the army, becoming an Oberst in 1932, and a Generalmajor in 1935. From 1933 to 1937, he was a military attaché to the United Kingdom, Belgium and the Netherlands, residing in London. Promoted to Generalleutnant upon his return from London, he took command of the 3rd Panzer (armoured) Division in 1937.

== World War II ==
From 1 September to 7 October 1939 Geyr commanded the 3rd Panzer Division during the invasion of Poland, where it was the most numerically powerful Panzer Division, with 391 tanks. For a victory at Kulm, he was praised on the battlefield by Hitler who had visited the division in recognition for its achievements in Poland. He was promoted to General der Kavallerie of the XXIV Army Corps on 15 February 1940. In 1940 he commanded the XXIV Army Corps during the Invasion of France. On 22 June 1941, the Wehrmacht begun the invasion of the Soviet Union. Geyr's XXIV Army Corps was part of General Heinz Guderian's Second Panzer Army, and consisted of all of Guderian's major tank units. On 9 July 1941, he was awarded the Knight's Cross of the Iron Cross as General der Panzertruppe. By early November 1941, Geyr's Army Corps commanded the 3rd, 4th, and 17th Panzer Divisions, the panzer regiment from the 18th Panzer Division, as well as the Infantry Regiment Großdeutschland, and spearheaded the advance of Army Group Centre during the Battle of Moscow.

From 21 July 1942, taking over from the court-martialed Georg Stumme, to 30 September 1942, he was commanding General of the XXXX Panzer Corps, taking part in the fighting in the Caucasus. Geyr was relieved in a command cadre shake-up at the end of September 1942.

In the spring of 1943, Field Marshal Gerd von Rundstedt ordered Geyr to prepare a force of 10 Panzer and motorised infantry divisions. On 19 November 1943 Geyr's command was formalised as Panzer Group West, which had responsibility for the training and formation of all armoured units in the west. This group of armoured divisions near Paris constituted the main force of tanks in France. In the event of a western allied landing on the northern French coast, Panzer Group West was expected to counter-attack northwards and halt the invasion force.

The western allied Invasion of Normandy began on 6 June 1944. By 8 June, Geyr moved three panzer divisions north to counter British and Canadian forces advancing on Caen during Operation Perch, a British offensive to capture the city as part of the Battle for Caen. On 10 June, Royal Air Force aircraft attacked Geyr's headquarters at La Caine, wounding him and killing several staff officers, forcing the cancellation of a planned counter-attack.
Geyr's panzer units delayed the British advance for weeks, but on 2 July, after supporting Field Marshal Gerd von Rundstedt’s request for a withdrawal from Caen, he was relieved of command. General Heinrich Eberbach succeeded him on 4 July, and Geyr later served as Inspector General of Armoured Troops until the war's end.

== Post-war ==
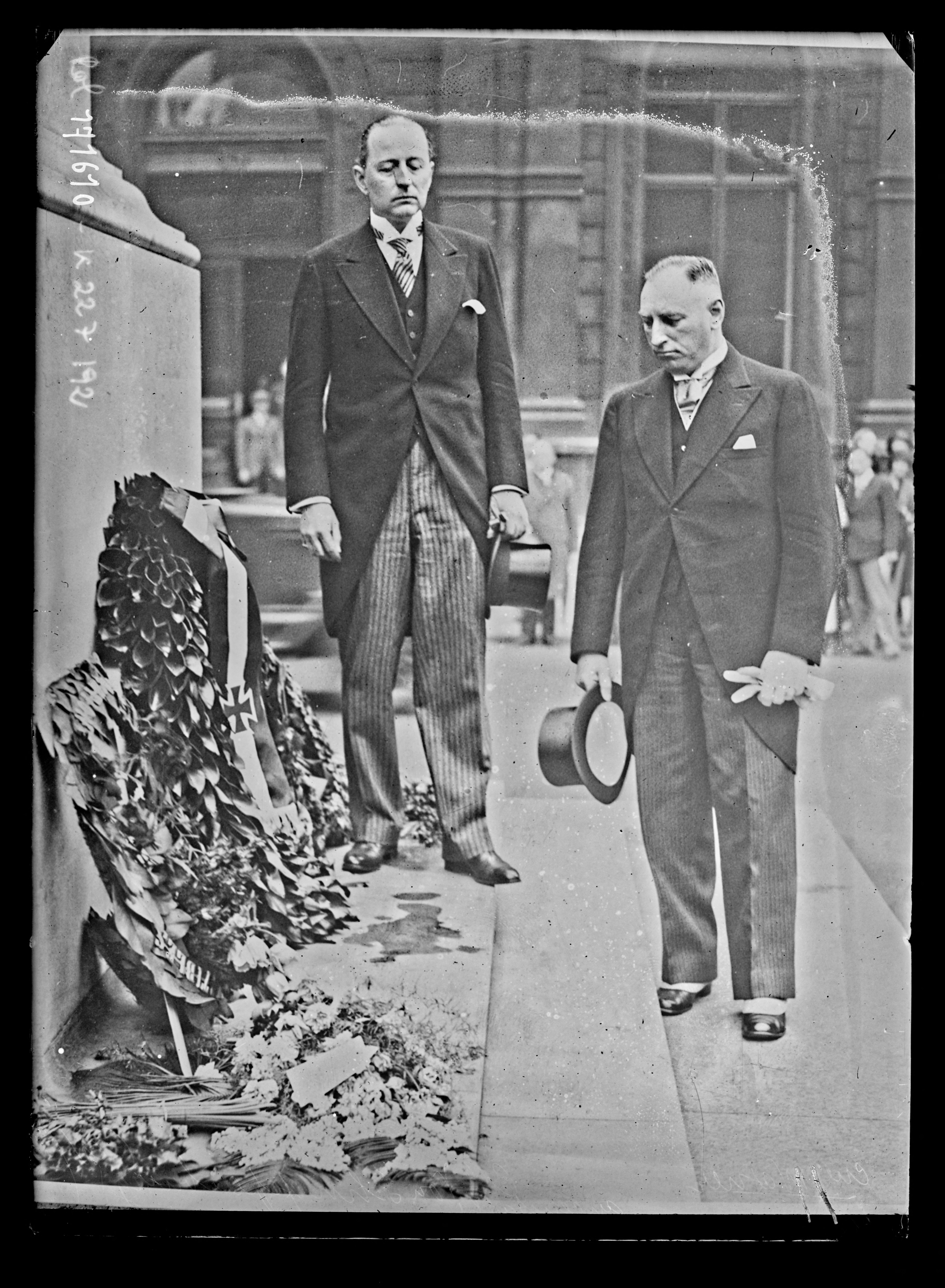
Colonel von Geyr (left) and Captain Wasner at The Cenotaph, London, 1933

Between 1945 and 1947, Geyr was in American captivity. He participated in the work of the U.S. Army Historical Division, where, under the guidance of Franz Halder, German generals wrote World War II operational studies for the U.S. Army, first as POWs and then as employees. After his release Geyr wrote a memoir of his years in London as a military attaché, Erinnerungen eines Militärattachés, London 1933–1937 (1949), which was translated and published along with additional material covering his life through World War II as The Critical Years (1952). During the early 1950s Geyr was involved in both the development and creation of the Bundeswehr of West Germany. Geyr died in Irschenhausen near Munich. He was married to Anais Krausse (22 July 1890, Ludwigsburg – 6 November 1960, Irschenhausen). Their daughter Blanche Freiin Geyr von Schweppenburg (24 March 1918 – 21 May 2003) was married to Curt-Christoph von Pfuel (2 September 1907, Berlin – 5 August 2000, Bonn), Prussian assessor, member of the Council of Europe, last Fideikommiss, Lord of Jahnsfelde.

== Works and memoirs ==
- Pz Gp. West: Report of the Commander (1947)
- Erinnerungen eines Militarattachés: London 1933–1937 (Stuttgart: Deutsche Verlags-Anstalt, 1949)
- Die Verteidigung des Westens (Frankfurt: Verlag Friedrich Rudl, 1952)
- Die große Frage (Bernard & Graefe, 1952)
- The Critical Years, with foreword by Leslie Hore-Belisha (London: Allan Wingate, 1952)

== Awards and decorations ==
- Iron Cross (1914)
  - 2nd Class
  - 1st Class
- Military Merit Order (Württemberg)
- Friedrich-August-Kreuz
  - 2nd Class
  - 1st Class
- Wound Badge (1918)
  - in Black
- Military Merit Cross (Austria-Hungary) 3rd Class with War Decoration
- Order of Bravery IV grade, 2nd class
- Cross of Honor
- Wehrmacht Long Service Award IV. – I.
- Iron Cross (1939)
  - 2nd Class
  - 1st Class
- Knight's Cross of the Iron Cross on 9 July 1941 as General der Panzertruppe and commander of XXIV. Armeekorps (motorized)

== Bibliography ==
- Peter Caddick-Adams (24 September 2013). Monty and Rommel: Parallel Lives. Overlook. pp. 220–221. ISBN 978-1-4683-0906-5.
- Fellgiebel, Walther-Peer (2000). Die Träger des Ritterkreuzes des Eisernen Kreuzes 1939–1945 — Die Inhaber der höchsten Auszeichnung des Zweiten Weltkrieges aller Wehrmachtteile [The Bearers of the Knight's Cross of the Iron Cross 1939–1945 — The Owners of the Highest Award of the Second World War of all Wehrmacht Branches] (in German). Friedberg, Germany: Podzun-Pallas. ISBN 978-3-7909-0284-6.
- Glantz, David M.; House, Jonathan (2009). To the Gates of Stalingrad: Soviet-German Combat Operations, April-August 1942. Lawrence, Kansas: University Press of Kansas. ISBN 9780700616305.
- Kienle, Polly (2005). "Still Fighting for the Myth: German Wehrmacht Officers' Reports for the U.S. Historical Division". H-net.com. Archived from the original on 31 January 2016.
- Searle, Alaric (2003). Wehrmacht Generals, West German Society, and the Debate on Rearmament, 1949–1959. Westport, CT: Praeger Publishers. ISBN 978-0-275-97968-3.
- Wette, Wolfram (2007). The Wehrmacht: History, Myth, Reality. Cambridge, Mass.: Harvard University Press. ISBN 9780674025776.

Military offices
Preceded by Generalmajor Ernst Feßmann	Commander of 3. Panzer-Division; 1 September 1939 – 7 October 1939	Succeeded by Generalleutnant Horst Stumpff
Preceded by General der Pioniere Walter Kuntze	Commander of XXIV Army Corps; 14 February 1940 - 7 January 1942	Succeeded by General der Panzertruppen Willibald von Langermann und Erlencamp
Preceded by General der Panzertruppen Georg Stumme	Commander of XXXX Panzer Corps; 20 July 1942 - 30 September 1942	Succeeded by General der Panzertruppen Gustav Fehn
Preceded by New formation	Commander of LVIII Panzer Corps; 28 July 1943 - 1 December 1943	Succeeded by General der Panzertruppe Hans-Karl Freiherr von Esebeck
Preceded by General der Panzertruppen Gustav von Vaerst	Commander of 5th Panzer Army; 19 November 1943 - 4 July 1944	Succeeded by General der Panzertruppen Heinrich Eberbach
