= Arno Jahr =

German Army General (1890-1943)

- Born: 3 December 1890; Prittitz, Province of Saxony, Prussia, German Empire
- Died: 21 January 1943 (aged 52); Stalingrad, Soviet Union
- Military career
- Allegiance: Nazi Germany
- Branch: Army (Wehrmacht)
- Rank: Generalleutnant
- Commands: 387th Infantry Division
- Conflicts: World War II
- Awards: Knight's Cross of the Iron Cross

Arno Jahr (3 December 1890 – 21 January 1943) was a general in the Wehrmacht of Nazi Germany during World War II. He was a recipient of the Knight's Cross of the Iron Cross.

He was an officer in World War I. After 1918 he was a police officer. In 1935 he was transferred to the Wehrmacht In 1937 he was promoted to colonel.

Jahr committed suicide on 21 January 1943 when his unit was being overrun as part of the encirclement during the Battle of Stalingrad.

== Awards and decorations ==
- Knight's Cross of the Iron Cross on 22 December 1942 as Generalleutnant and commander of 387. Infanterie-Division

== Notes ==
Military offices
Preceded by None	Commander of 387th Infantry Division; 1 February 1942 – 20 January 1943	Succeeded by Generalmajor Eberhard von Schuckmann
