= 4th Panzer Division =

German army division during World War II

- 4. Panzer-Division; — 4. PzDiv —
- Unit insignia 1942
- Active: 10 November 1938–8 May 1945
- Country: Germany
- Allegiance: Adolf Hitler
- Branch: German Army
- Type: Panzer
- Role: Armored warfare
- Size: Division
- Part of: Wehrmacht
- Garrison/HQ: Wehrkreis XIII: Würzburg
- Engagements: World War II; Invasion of Poland; Battle of France; Operation Barbarossa; Battle of Kursk; Courland Pocket

Commanders
- Notable commanders: Georg-Hans Reinhardt

Insignia
- 1939

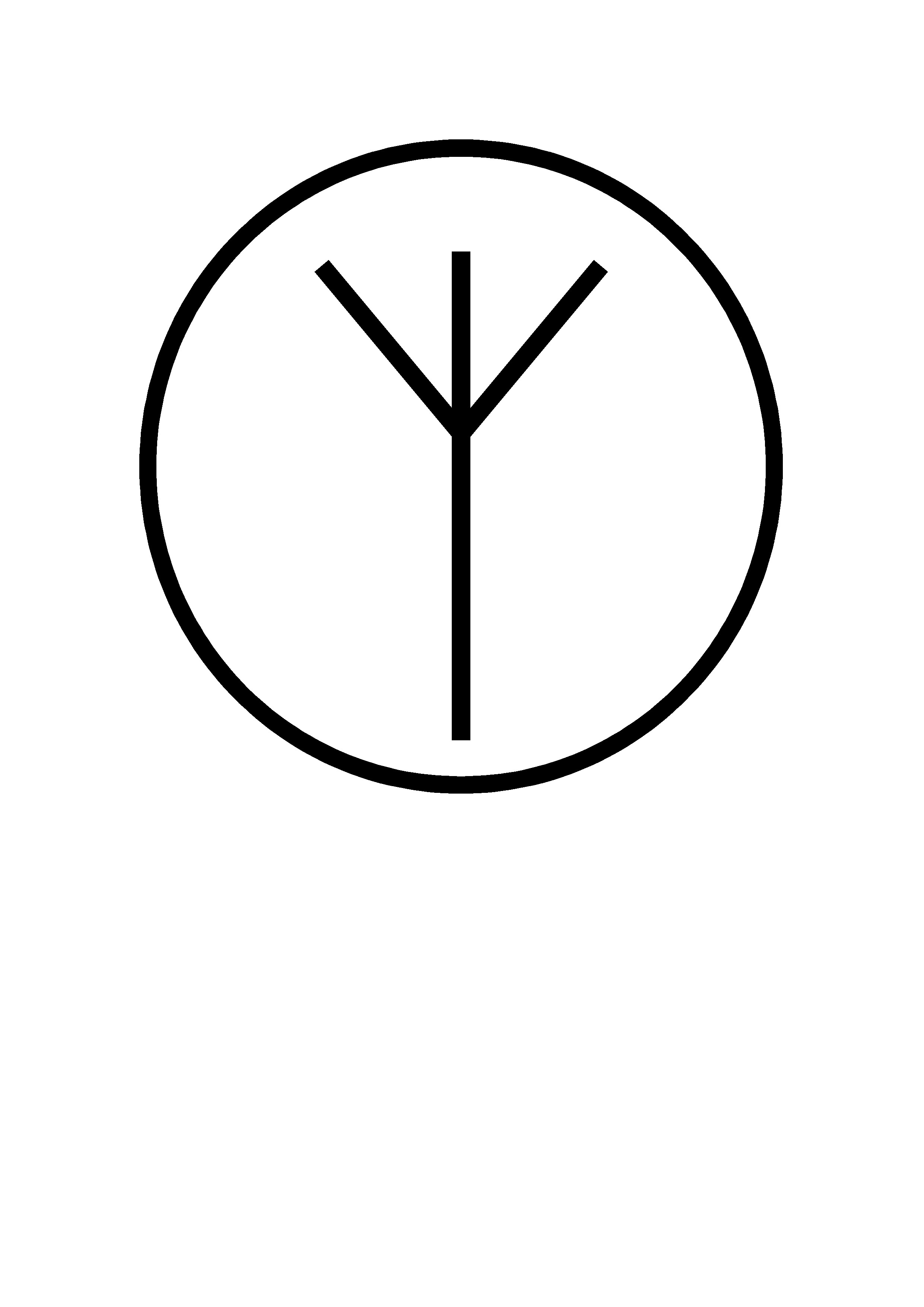
- 1940 and 1943–1945 (variant)

- 1942

- at Battle of Kursk

The 4th Panzer Division (English: 4th Tank Division) was an armored division in the Army of Nazi Germany.

In World War II, it participated in the 1939 invasion of Poland, the 1940 invasion of France, and the 1941 invasion of the Soviet Union. It remained on the Eastern Front, mainly under Army Group Center, until it was trapped on the coast at Courland in the summer of 1944. It was evacuated by sea and returned to the main front in West Prussia in January 1945. There it surrendered to the Red Army at the end of the war.

== History ==
=== Formation ===
The 4th Panzer Division was formed in Würzburg, Bavaria, on 10 November 1938 as the first of a second wave of new armored divisions in Germany following the creation of the original three tank divisions in 1935. Alongside the 4th Panzer Division the 5th was formed at Oppeln, now Opole in Poland, five days later.

Würzburg had previously been the garrison town for the 2nd Panzer Division which had moved its headquarters to Vienna after the Anschluss of Austria in March 1938. The division's insignia, which were emblazoned on tank turrets, was derived from the "Algiz" rune.

=== Invasion of Poland ===
At the beginning of the Invasion of Poland (1939), the division was one of the first to cross the border in the operational area of Army Group South. Equipped with roughly 341 tanks, including 183 Panzer I, 130 Panzer II, 12 Panzer IV and 16 PzBef command tanks. The division lacked some infantry and anti-tank units. After entering Polish territory, on 1 September, the division used civilians as human shields during the Battle of Mokra. During that battle the division was fighting the Polish Volhynian Cavalry Brigade under Colonel Julian Filipowicz. A Polish aircraft was shot down on 3 September and its crew taken prisoner. One of its passengers was brutally interrogated, tortured (German soldiers cut off his nose, ears and tongue) and then executed by personnel of the 4th Division.

After supporting 1st Panzer, the division took part in the break-through of the Polish lines near Kłobuck, the Poles withdrew. Three days later, the 4th Panzer Division continued its move towards Warsaw. It reached the Polish capital on 8 September and tried to take the city by surprise. At 17.00, the forces of the 4th Panzer Division supported by the 31st Infantry Division attempted an assault on Warsaw's western borough of Ochota. The assault was repulsed and the German forces suffered heavy casualties. The following day, the division was reinforced with artillery and the Leibstandarte Adolf Hitler motorized infantry regiment, and began another assault towards Ochota and Wola. Well-placed Polish anti-tank guns and barricades erected on main streets repulsed this assault. On several occasions, the lack of armament on the Polish side was made up for by ingenuity. One of the streets leading towards the city centre was covered with turpentine from a nearby factory. When German tanks approached, the liquid was set on fire, and the tanks were destroyed without a shot being fired. The German forces suffered heavy casualties and had to retreat. After the failed assault on Warsaw, 4th Panzer Division was withdrawn westward and took part in the Battle of the Bzura, where it supported a German counter-attack.

On 18 September, in the village of Śladów, units of the 4th Panzer Division shot or drowned 252 prisoners of war and 106 civilians in the Vistula (the Śladów massacre). That was not the only war crime committed by that unit; on 8 September in Mszczonów 11 Polish prisoners of war were executed by elements of the 4th Division.

After that it was withdrawn to the Niederrhein.

=== Invasion of France ===
During the Battle of France in 1940, the division came under the command of Erich Hoepner's XVI Panzer Corps, part of von Kleist's Panzer Group in the 6th Army commanded by Walther von Reichenau. After a blitzkrieg assault through Liège and Charleroi, it reached the area of Bethune, where it fought against the British Expeditionary Force in what became known as the battle of Dunkirk. However, due to Adolf Hitler's orders, it did not manage to capture Dunkirk itself. In early June 1940, the division managed to cross a large part of France in several days. By the time that the cease fire was signed, it had reached Grenoble almost unopposed. After several months of occupation duty in France, in late November, the 4th Division was withdrawn to Würzburg, where it was reorganized and reinforced. The 36th Panzer Regiment was detached and assigned to the newly formed 14th Panzer Division, while the 103rd Artillery Regiment was reinforced with a third battalion.

=== Invasion of the Soviet Union ===
The division was moved to East Prussia and then to the area of Brześć Litewski in occupied Poland, where it was assigned to the XXIV Panzer Corps under Geyr von Schweppenburg. On 22 June 1941, it took part in the opening stages of Operation Barbarossa, the German invasion of the Soviet Union. During the first day, the division managed to drive a wedge into the Soviet positions and reached Kobryń some 65 kilometers behind the lines. The division then spearheaded one of the pincer moves to surround and destroy a large Soviet force in the battle of Minsk, where the German army took approximately 300,000 prisoners. After the battle of Gomel it reached Kiev, where it fought against another pocket of resistance.

In September 1941, the division was attached to Army Group Centre, which was preparing to take part in the battle of Moscow. The assault started on 30 September 1941, the division captured Orel in early October but was ambushed on the road to Mtsensk by 1st Guards Rifle Corps on the 6th of that month. Attempts by the outclassed Panzers to maneuver round the Soviet flanks were defeated with heavy loss as the Soviet T-34s savaged the under-armored Mark IV tanks, reducing much of the divisional armor to burned out, smoking wreckage by end of day. The advance resumed with growing loss and in late October Heinz Guderian concentrated most of the 2nd Panzer groups' remaining tanks into a single brigade under the 4th Panzer division, the spearhead of the XXIV Panzer Corps. By mid-November it was down to 50 tanks but still ground on reaching Tula, as the southern arm of a pincer which tried to surround the Soviet capital. The Germans formations were paralyzed when the fall rains set in, turning the only road to Tula into a stretch of mud. Bogged down German tanks were attacked by Soviet aircraft. With the onset of frost in early November, the Germans could use the roads again, but faced the problem of not being equipped for winter warfare. Warm clothing and white camouflage suits were lacking, and tanks and other vehicles were immobilized as temperatures dropped below freezing.

On 5 December, the division was withdrawn and ordered to defend a stretch of front near Moscow against a Soviet winter counter-offensive. In a series of retreats, the division lost almost all of its tanks. A month later it had only 25 machines still operational. It withdrew to the Orel area, where the thaw halted the Soviet counter-offensive and the unit could be partially reinforced. Throughout 1942 it fought in the battle of Orel, a series of almost World War I-like skirmishes, assaults and counter-assaults. It took part in the failed Battle of Kursk, after which it withdrew to the area along the Desna River. After a series of Soviet advances, the front line was finally stabilized near Bobruysk, where the division spent the winter of 1943–1944.

=== Retreat (1943–1945) ===
In the spring of 1944, the division moved to the area of Kowel in occupied Poland, where it was to support Army Group South during the expected Soviet spring offensive. However, Operation Bagration, (started on 22 June 1944), was aimed at Army Group Center and the division retreated with the rest of the German army. Assigned to the XXXIX Panzer Corps under Gen. Karl Decker, the division withdrew to the area of Warsaw, where the Soviet advance ran out of momentum at the end of July. The 4th Panzer Division took part in the Battle of Radzymin (also known as the Battle of Wołomin) and on 2 August 1944, alongside the 19th Panzer Division, threw the Soviet III Tank Corps back to Wołomin. The Soviet Tank Corps suffered heavy losses and their advance halted.

The division was then transported to northern Lithuania, where it was to support Army Group North. It was attached to the 3rd Panzer Army. The Soviet advance cut the German army group in two and the division was mostly dispersed. Some of its sub-units were cut off from the rest of German-held territory, along with the 16th and 18th Armies, in Livonia on the Courland Peninsula, where they supported the defense until the end of the war. Other units were attached to smaller, often improvised formations.

== Commanders ==
The commanders of the division:

- Generaloberst Georg-Hans Reinhardt (1 September 1939 – 5 February 1940)
- Generalleutnant Ludwig Ritter von Radlmeier (5 February 1940 – 8 June 1940)
- Generalleutnant Johann Joachim Stever (8 June 1940 – 24 July 1940)
- Generalleutnant Hans Reichsfreiherr von Boineburg-Lengsfeld (24 July 1940 – 8 September 1940)
- General der Panzertruppe Willibald Freiherr von Langermann und Erlencamp (8 September 1940 – 27 December 1941)
- General der Panzertruppe Dietrich von Saucken (27 December 1941 – 2 January 1942)
- General der Panzertruppe Willibald Freiherr von Langermann und Erlencamp (2 January 1942 – 6 January 1942)
- General der Panzertruppe Heinrich Eberbach (6 January 1942 – 2 March 1942)
- Generalleutnant Otto Heidkämper (2 March 1942 – 4 April 1942)
- General der Panzertruppe Heinrich Eberbach (4 April 1942 – 14 November 1942)
- Generalleutnant Erich Schneider (14 November 1942 – 31 May 1943)
- General der Panzertruppe Dietrich von Saucken (31 May 1943 – ? January 1944)
- Generalleutnant Hans Junck (21 January 1944 – 7 February 1944)
- General der Panzertruppe Dietrich von Saucken (? February 1944 – 1 May 1944)
- Generalleutnant Clemens Betzel (1 May 1944 – 27 March 1945)
- Oberst Ernst-Wilhelm Hoffmann (27 March 1945 – 8 May 1945)

== Orders of battle ==
The organisation of the division:

=== Invasion of Poland 1939 ===
- Divisionstab
- 4. Schützen-Brigade
  - Schützen-Regiment 12
- 5. Panzer-Brigade
  - Panzer-Regiment 35
  - Panzer-Regiment 36
- Artillerie-Regiment 103
- Aufklärungs-Abteilung 7
- Panzerabwehr-Battalion 49
- Pionier-Battalion 79
- Nachrichten-Abteilung 79

=== Battle of Kursk 1943 ===
- Divisionstab
- Panzergrenadier-Regiment 12
- Panzergrenadier-Regiment 33
- II./Panzer-Regiment 35
- Artillerie-Regiment 103
- Panzerjäger-Abteilung 49
- Feldersatz-Battalion 103
- Panzer-Pionier-Battalion 79
- Panzer-Nachrichten-Abteilung 79
- Heeres-Flak-Abteilung 290
- 84.Versorgungstruppen

== See also ==
- List of German divisions in World War II
- Organization of a SS Panzer Division
- Panzer division
