= 385th =

385th may refer to:

- 385th Air Expeditionary Group, constituted as the 385th Bombardment Group (Heavy) on 25 November 1942 Activated on 1 December 1942
- 385th Fighter Squadron, inactive United States Air Force unit
- 385th Infantry Division (Wehrmacht), also known as a "Rheingold" Division, created on 10 January 1942 in Fallingbostel
- 385th Infantry Regiment (United States), part of the 76th Infantry Division of the US Army during World War II; fought in Germany

== See also ==
- 385 (number)
- 385, the year 385 (CCCLXXXV) of the Julian calendar
- 385 BC
