= Karl Eibl =

Austrian-German military officer and general (1891–1943)

- Born: 23 July 1891; Bad Goisern, Upper Austria, Austria-Hungary
- Died: 21 January 1943 (aged 51); Kravzoka, Soviet Union
- Military career
- Allegiance: Austria-Hungary (to 1918); First Austrian Republic (to 1938); Nazi Germany
- Branch: Army (Wehrmacht)
- Service years: 1914–43
- Rank: General of the Infantry (posthumously)
- Commands: 385th Infantry Division
- Conflicts: World War I; World War II; Invasion of Poland; Operation Barbarossa
- Awards: Knight's Cross of the Iron Cross with Oak Leaves and Swords

Karl Eibl (23 July 1891 – 21 January 1943) was an Austrian general in the Wehrmacht of Nazi Germany during World War II. He was a recipient of the Knight's Cross of the Iron Cross with Oak Leaves and Swords. He also served in World War 1 as an officer in the Austrian Landwehrregiment 21.

Eibl was killed north-west of Rossosch on 21 January 1943, during the chaotic retreat forced by the Russian offensive, Operation Little Saturn, when Italian soldiers mistook his command vehicle for a Soviet armored car and blew it up with hand grenades. There is a memorial monument dedicated to him in the city park of Krems, Austria. However, the circumstances of EIbls death are still controversial. According to References sourced from "General Nasci's daily reports and bulletins of the Italian Alpinjaeger corps in Russia", Eibl was killed on the night of 21 January 1943 because he was blown by an unexploded bomb. The explosion wounded him in a foot and later on, he was transported to a casualty collection point in the village Krawzowka (or Kravzoka), northwest of Rossosh, where he underwent the amputation of his foot. He died afterward.

== Awards ==
- Infantry Assault Badge
- Wound Badge (1939) in Black
- Iron Cross (1939) 2nd Class (23 September 1939) & 1st Class (5 November 1939)
- Knight's Cross of the Iron Cross with Oak Leaves and Swords
  - Knight's Cross on 15 August 1940 as Oberstleutnant and commander of the III./Infanterie-Regiment 131
  - Oak Leaves on 31 December 1941 as Oberst and commander of Infanterie-Regiment 132
  - Swords on 19 December 1942 as Generalmajor and commander of 385. Infanterie-Division
