= Willibald von Langermann und Erlencamp =

German World War II general

Willibald Freiherr von Langermann und Erlencamp
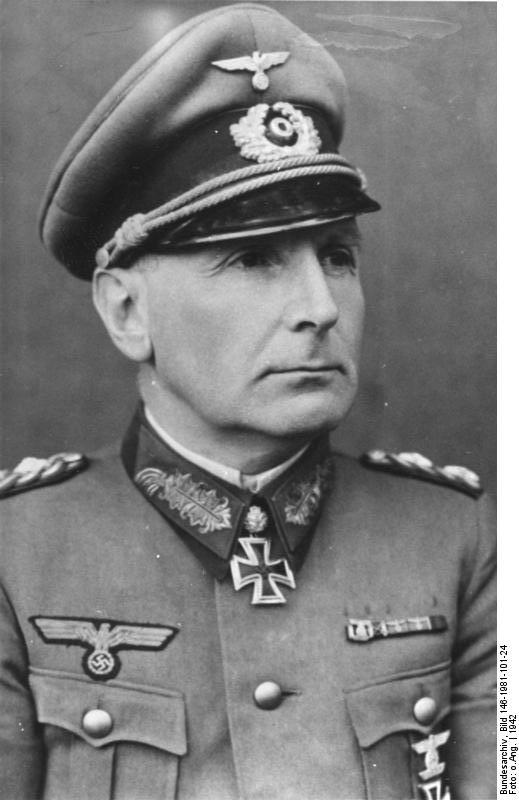
- Langermann und Erlencamp in 1942
- Born: 29 March 1890; Karlsruhe, Grand Duchy of Baden, German Empire
- Died: 3 October 1942 (aged 52) †; Storozhevoye, Russian SFSR, Soviet Union
- Relatives: ∞ 19 August 1916 (o¦o 1938) Ermgard Karla Adrienne Wilhelmine Ferdinande von Eschwege; 2 children ∞ 28 March 1939 Dorothea Rudolph; 1 daughter
- Military career
- Allegiance: German Empire; Weimar Republic; Nazi Germany
- Branch: Prussian Army; Imperial German Army; Reichsheer; German Army
- Service years: 1910–1942
- Rank: General der Panzertruppe
- Commands: 29th Infantry Division; 4th Panzer Division
- Conflicts: World War I World War II: Battle of France; Operation Barbarossa; Operation Typhoon; Battle of Stalingrad (KIA)
- Awards: Knight's Cross of the Iron Cross with Oak Leaves

Willibald Karl Moritz Robert Rudolf Freiherr von Langermann und Erlencamp (29 March 1890 – 3 October 1942) was a German general during World War II. He was a recipient of the Knight's Cross of the Iron Cross with Oak Leaves of Nazi Germany.

== Biography ==
Born in 1890, Erlencamp joined the 5th Dragoon Regiment of the Imperial German Army in 1910. From 1935, he commanded the 4th Cavalry Regiment before an appointment three years later as Higher Cavalry Officer I. He was later made inspector of cavalry and transport. After the commencement of World War II, he was appointed to command Special Administrative Staff 410. In March 1940 he was promoted to Generalmajor, just before the Battle of France he was named commander of the 29th Motorized Infantry Division. He successfully led the division through the campaigns in Belgium and France and was awarded the Knight's Cross of the Iron Cross on 15 August 1940. He had received the Iron Cross, 1st and 2nd Classes, earlier in the year.

On 7 September 1940, Erlencamp was given command of the 4th Panzer Division, which he led from the opening stages of Operation Barbarossa up until the closing stages of Operation Typhoon. In January 1942 he was appointed as commander of the XXIV Panzer Corps. Within weeks, he received a promotion to Generalleutnant and this was followed in mid-1942 by a further advance in rank to General der panzertruppe. On 17 February 1942, he was awarded the Oak Leaves to the Knights Cross.

== Death ==
He was killed in action on 3 October 1942 at Storoshewoje on the Middle Don ("in a foray in the front line"). His only son, 19-year-old Fahnenjunker-Unteroffizier (Officer Candidate with Corporal/NCO/Junior Sergeant rank) Eginhard Rudolf Harro-Burchard Felix Freiherr von Langermann und Erlencamp (b. 16 December 1922 in Hofgeismar), had been severely wounded at the Eastern Front and died shortly afterwards in a German war military hospital in Charkow on 28 March 1942.

== Awards and decorations ==
- Iron Cross (1914), 2nd and 1st Class
- Honour Cross of the World War 1914/1918 with Swords
- Wehrmacht Long Service Award, 4th to 1st Class
- Sudetenland Medal
- Repetition Clasp 1939 to the Iron Cross 1914, 2nd and 1st Class
  - 2nd Class on 30 May 1940
  - 1st Class on 14 June 1914
- Panzer Battle Badge in Silver
- Mentioned by name in the Wehrmachtbericht on 5 October 1942
- Knight's Cross of the Iron Cross with Oak Leaves
  - 178th Knight's Cross on 15 August 1940 as Major General and Commander of the 29th Infantry Division (motorized)
  - 75th Oak Leaves on 17 February 1942 as Major General and Commander of the 4th Panzer Division

== Bibliography ==
- Fellgiebel, Walther-Peer (2000) [1986]. Die Träger des Ritterkreuzes des Eisernen Kreuzes 1939–1945 — Die Inhaber der höchsten Auszeichnung des Zweiten Weltkrieges aller Wehrmachtteile [The Bearers of the Knight's Cross of the Iron Cross 1939–1945 — The Owners of the Highest Award of the Second World War of all Wehrmacht Branches] (in German). Friedberg, Germany: Podzun-Pallas. ISBN 978-3-7909-0284-6.
- Hartmann, Christian (2010). Front und militärisches Hinterland 1941/42 (Quellen und Darstellungen zur Zeitgeschichte, Band 75). Berlin, Germany: De Gruyter. ISBN 978-3-486-70226-2.
- Mitcham, Samuel W. (2007). Panzer Legions: A Guide to the German Army Tank Divisions of WWII and Their Commanders. Mechanicsburg, PA, United States: Stackpole Books. ISBN 978-0-8117-3353-3.
- Thomas, Franz (1998). Die Eichenlaubträger 1939–1945 Band 2: L–Z [The Oak Leaves Bearers 1939–1945 Volume 2: L–Z] (in German). Osnabrück, Germany: Biblio-Verlag. ISBN 978-3-7648-2300-9.

Military offices
Preceded by Generalleutnant Joachim Lemelsen	Commander of 29th Infantry Division; 7 May 1940 – 1 July 1940	Succeeded by Generalmajor Walter von Boltenstern
Preceded by Generalleutnant Hans Reichsfreiherr von Boineburg-Lengsfeld	Commander of 4th Panzer Division; 8 September 1940 – 27 December 1941	Succeeded by General der Panzertruppe Dietrich von Saucken
Preceded by General der Panzertruppe Leo Freiherr Geyr von Schweppenburg	Commander of XXIV Army Corps; 7 January 1942 – 21 June 1942	Succeeded by redesignated XXIV Panzer Corps
Preceded by XXIV Army Corps	Commander of XXIV Panzer Corps; 21 June 1942 – 3 October 1942	Succeeded by General der Panzertruppe Otto von Knobelsdorff
