= 385th Infantry Division =

- German: 385. Infanterie-Division
- Active: 10 January 1942 – 17 February 1943
- Country: Nazi Germany
- Branch: Army
- Type: Infantry
- Size: Division
- Garrison/HQ: Fallingbostel
- Nickname: "Rheingold Division"
- Engagements: World War II: Ostrogozhsk–Rossosh offensive

Commanders
- Notable commanders: Karl Eibl

The 385th Infantry Division, (German: 385. Infanterie-Division) also known as a "Rheingold" Division, was created on 10 January 1942 in Fallingbostel. The division was composed of replacement troops from military districts VI, X and XI. From April 16, 1942, the 385th Infantry Division moved to the Roslavl area and fought in the front lines at the Fomino area.

The division was annihilated near the Don River during the Battle of Stalingrad in early 1943 while subordinated to the 8th Italian Army. It had previously fallen under heavy frontal attack during the Ostrogozhsk–Rossosh offensive by the 12th Tank Corps and 15th Tank Corps.

The 385th Infantry Division was trapped as part of the encirclement between 15 and 26 January 1943 (along with 387th Infantry, Tridentina, Julia, Cuneense and Vicenza divisions), when Soviet troops encircled XXIV Panzer Corps and the Italian Alpini Corps.

The division was disbanded in the period from February to March 1943 and its survivors joined the 387th Infantry Division.

== Commanding officers ==
- General der Infanterie Karl Eibl, 7 January 1942 – 18 December 1942 (KIA)
- Generalmajor Eberhard von Schuckmann, 18 December 1942 – 15 February 1943
