= Osovets offensive =

- Part of Operation Bagration / Eastern Front
Date	6–14 August 1944
Location	Poland
Result	Soviet victory

Belligerents
Germany	Soviet Union

Commanders and leaders
(Nazi Germany) Helmuth Weidling, (Nazi Germany) Friedrich Herrlein	(Soviet Union) Gyorgy Zakharov (2nd Belorussian Front)

Strength
?	?

Casualties and losses
?	?

The Osovets offensive (Russian: Осовецкая наступательная операция) was part of the third and final phase of Operation Bagration, the Belorussian strategic offensive of the Red Army in summer 1944. The offensive began on 6 August and was officially declared over as of 14 August, although some of its objectives were not achieved until as late as January 1945.

Osovets is the Russianised version of the Polish name Osowiec, also known as Ossowiec, Ossowitz.

== Operational goals ==
The offensive commenced after the 2nd Belorussian Front had successfully taken Grodno and Białystok in the Belostock offensive (Belostock is the Russianised version of the Polish name Białystok). The Front was issued with new objectives at the end of July, being ordered to move on Łomża (German: Lomscha) and Ostrołęka (German: Scharfenwiese) and to enlarge bridgeheads over the Narew river in preparation for further advance into East Prussia.

The defenders were somewhat aided by fortifications from previous eras, including a major Imperial Russian-era fortress complex at Osowiec on the Biebrza River that was a scene of several battles during the First World War. It was partly demolished by Wehrmacht troops in 1939 before its hand-over to the Red Army. There were also substantial Soviet border fortifications remaining from the Molotov Line located 20 km west of the old fortress.

== Deployments ==
=== Wehrmacht ===
- Elements of Fourth Army (General der Infanterie Friedrich Hossbach)
  - VI Corps (General der Artillerie Helmuth Weidling)
- Elements of Second Army (Generaloberst Walter Weiß)
  - LV Corps (General der Infanterie Friedrich Herrlein)

The above units were two of the armies under the overall command of Army Group Centre (Generalfeldmarschall Walter Model).

=== Red Army ===
Below is a list of units credited with participation in the liberation of Osovets, and not those participating in the operation as a whole.

- 2nd Belorussian Front (Colonel-General Georgy Zakharov)

87th NKVD Border Guard Regiment (Major Aleksander Olschuk)

- 49th Army (Lieutenant-General Ivan Grishin)

343rd Rifle Division (Major-General Anton Yakimovich – KIA)
121st Rifle Corps (General-Major Dimitri Ivanovich Smirnov)
- 238th Rifle Division (General-Major Ivan Krasnoshtanov)
- 385th Rifle Division (General-Major Mitrofan Suprunov)
- 23rd Guards Tank Brigade (Colonel Sergey Kozikov)

- 50th Army (Lieutenant-General Ivan Boldin)

81st Rifle Corps (General-Major Fedor Zakharov)
- 95th Rifle Division
- 290th Rifle Division
- 307th Rifle Division (Maj. Gen. Vasilii Nikitich Dalmatov)

1434th Self-propelled Artillery Regiment (Lt. Colonel Boris Kopylov)
1444th Self-propelled Artillery Regiment (Colonel Fedor Myachev)
27th Anti-Tank Destroyer Artillery Brigade (Sub-Colonel Kriskent Semyanov)

- 4th Air Army (Colonel-General Konstantin Vershinin)

230th Assault Aviation Division (General-Major of Aviation Semyon Get'man) (part only)
233rd Assault Aviation Division (Colonel Valentin Smolovik) (part only)
229th Fighter Aviation Division (Colonel Mikhail Volkov) (part only)
309th Fighter Aviation Division (Colonel Vasily Buss) (part only)
325th Night Bomber Aviation Division (Colonel Grigory Pokoyevoy)

8th Fighter Aviation Corps (General-Major of Aviation Fedor Zherebchenko) (from 16th Air Army)

215th Fighter Aviation Division (Colonel Mikhail Yakushin)

4th Assault Aviation Corps (General-Major of Aviation Georgiy Baidukov)

199th Assault Aviation Division (Colonel Nikolay Vinogradov)

== The offensive ==
The offensive began on 6 August with further penetrations by the 2nd Belorussian Front west of Bialystok.

The approaches to Osowiec were heavily defended; the 1st Guards Assault Engineer Brigade was required to establish river crossings under fire. Units of the Front stormed and took the fortress, after a heavy air bombardment by Major-General Georgy Baydukov's 4th Assault Aviation Corps, on 14 August. Joseph Stalin's Order no. 166 for that day noted the capture of the fortress and congratulated the units and commanders involved.

14 August is noted as the end of the offensive in official Soviet historiography, but attempts continued to seize bridgeheads over the Narew throughout the remainder of August. The 49th Army, however, found that the German defences on the approaches to Lomza were difficult to overcome, sustaining many casualties (even losing a divisional commander, Major-General Yakimovich of the 343rd Rifle Division, in their attempt to force the defensive lines).

Lomza itself was not taken until mid-September; there were intense battles along the Narew as Second Army was progressively reinforced and attempted to crush the bridgeheads.

== Aftermath ==
Although there were many local actions (including attacks by Polish partisans, who had a strong presence in the area) the German defence line on the Narew held through the remainder of 1944, until the 2nd Belorussian Front's advance in the East Prussian Operation of January 1945.
