= Belostok offensive =

World War II military operation

- Part of Operation Bagration
| Date | 5–27 July 1944 |
| Location | Belarus and Poland |
| Result | Soviet victory |

Belligerents
| Germany | Soviet Union |

Commanders and leaders
| (Nazi Germany) Helmuth Weidling (remnants of Fourth Army); Walter Weiß (elements of Second Army) | (Soviet Union) Georgy Zakharov (2nd Belorussian Front) |

Strength
| ? | ? |

Casualties and losses
| 30,000 killed 1,011 POW (Soviet est) | ? |

The Belostok offensive (Russian: Белостокская наступательная операция) was part of the third and final phase of the Belorussian strategic offensive of the Red Army in summer 1944, commonly known as Operation Bagration. The Belostok offensive was part of the third, or 'pursuit' phase of Operation Bagration, and was commenced after the completion of the encirclement and destruction of much of Army Group Centre in the Minsk offensive. Belostok (Russian: Белосток) is the Russian name of the Polish city of Białystok.

== Planning ==
=== Operational goals ===
After completing its mission of liquidating the pocket east of Minsk, in which the Fourth Army had been trapped, the bulk of the 2nd Belorussian Front was issued new objectives: initially, to capture Volkovysk and advance towards Białystok. The 49th Army, however, was further employed in reducing the encirclement until mid-July. The 4th Air Army continued its mission of providing support for the Front's ground forces.

=== German intelligence ===
After the fall of Minsk the Oberkommando des Heeres could call on few reserves to stop the Soviet advance. On the Białystok axis, the remaining forces were organised into a 'blocking group' (German: Sperrgruppe) under the command of General Helmuth Weidling. This included several new formations in addition to the very few troops that had escaped from east of Minsk. To the south, the defence was conducted by the northern wing of Second Army, which had been reinforced, notably with the 28th Jäger Division, in the hope of mounting an attack to break through to the units of Army Group Centre still trapped east of Minsk.

The Germans' defence efforts were aided by the presence of old fortifications and defence works from World War I and earlier.

== Deployments ==
=== Wehrmacht ===
- Remnants of Fourth Army (General Kurt von Tippelskirch to 18 July, then General Friedrich Hoßbach)
  - Sperrgruppe Weidling (later renamed VI Corps)
    - 50th Infantry Division
    - Kampfgruppe Florke
    - Kampfgruppe von Gottberg
    - 5th Panzer Division
    - Part of 3rd SS Division Totenkopf
- Northern wing of Second Army (Colonel-General Walter Weiß)
  - LV Corps (General Friedrich Herrlein)

The above units were under the overall command of Army Group Centre (Field-Marshal Walter Model).

=== Red Army ===
- 2nd Belorussian Front (Colonel-General Georgy Zakharov)
  - 49th Army (Lieutenant-General Ivan Grishin)
  - 50th Army (Lieutenant-General Ivan Boldin)
  - 4th Air Army

== The offensive ==
=== Grodno falls ===
By 11 July the 50th Army had forced crossings of the Neman south of Dokudovo and moved forward against Weidling's forces. It crossed the Kotra River by 13 July, and reached Grodno by 15 July. Its 69th and 81st Rifle Corps stormed Grodno on the morning of the next day. The Soviet 3rd Army, on the northern flank of the neighbouring 1st Belorussian Front, took Volkovysk in fighting against Herrlein's LV Corps.

=== The German counter-attack ===
On 23 July, the Fourth Army commander, Hoßbach, in agreement with Model, committed the newly arrived 19th Panzer Division into a counter-attack with the intention of cutting off the Soviet spearheads in the Augustow Forest. One regiment surprised the Soviet forces in Grodno (and claimed to have destroyed some 180 tanks, though this seems excessive) before being forced back southwards towards Białystok. A second regiment recaptured Lipsk, but then was forced to withdraw to assist the first regiment's disengagement. Due to a lack of resources, the German counter-offensive failed, but revealed the exhaustion of both the Soviet and German troops in comparison to fresh units.

The 2nd Belorussian Front had successfully forced the entire length of the Neman and Svisloch by 24 July; the 50th Army, with support from the 3rd Guards Cavalry Corps, took or retook the eastern part of the Augustow Forest and part of the outlying fortifications of Grodno which the Germans had retained after their counter-offensive. There was intense fighting as the German 50th Infantry Division attempted to defend the highway between Grodno and Białystok.

In the meantime, the 3rd Army had reached the outskirts of Białystok itself, despite strong resistance from the LV Corps. It stormed the city and took it by 27 July, after several days of street fighting.

== Outcome ==
The Belostok offensive had proved largely successful in terms of its immediate tactical objectives: by the end of July the Soviets were in possession of the communications centres of Grodno and Białystok. However, their supply lines were becoming dangerously extended and their troops exhausted; progress slowed as the Army Group Centre commander, Model, was able to organise an effective defence through judicious management of the few units available.

The 2nd Belorussian Front's final objective in Operation Bagration was to advance to the Narew River in the Osovets offensive.
