= Mogilev offensive =

1944 Red Army offensive in Byelorussia

- Part of Operation Bagration
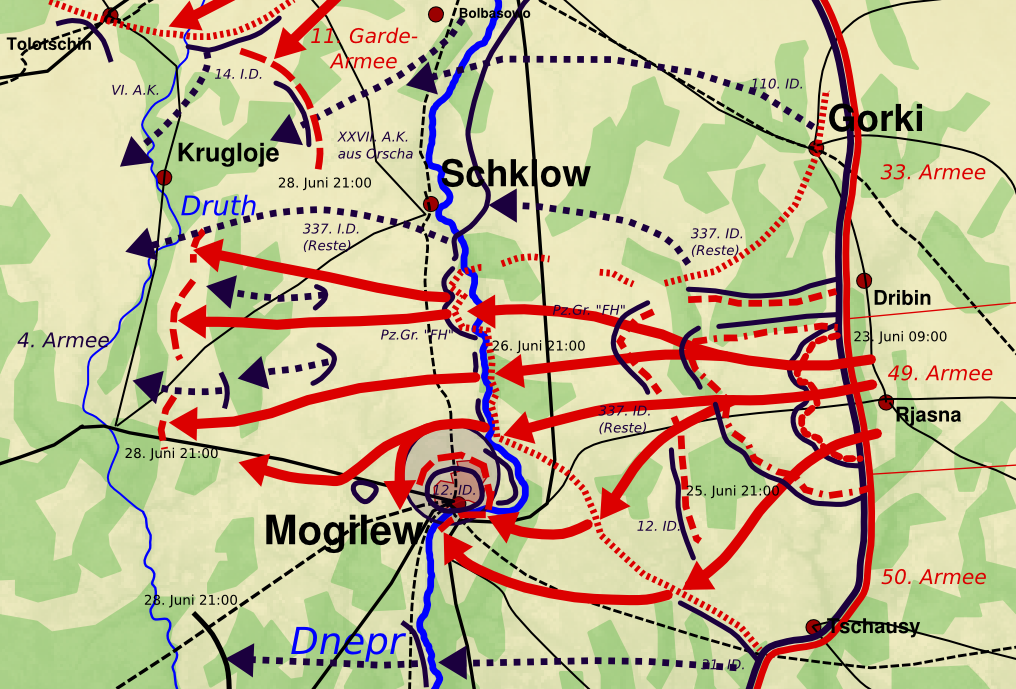
| Date | June 23, 1944 – June 28, 1944 |
| Location | Belorussian SSR 53.9°N 30.2°E |
| Result | Soviet victory |

Belligerents
| Germany | Soviet Union |

Commanders and leaders
| (Nazi Germany) Kurt von Tippelskirch (Fourth Army) (Nazi Germany) Rudolf Bamler (surrendered) (Twelfth Inf Division) | (Soviet Union) Georgiy Zakharov (2nd Belorussian Front) |

Strength
| Unknown | Unknown |

Casualties and losses
| 33,000 killed 3,250 POW (Soviet est) | Unknown |

The Mogilev offensive (Russian: Могилевская наступательная операция) was part of the Belorussian strategic offensive – commonly known as Operation Bagration – of the Red Army on the Eastern Front of World War II in the summer of 1944. Its goals were to capture the city of Mogilev and to pin down and trap the bulk of the German Fourth Army. The offensive fulfilled both objectives.

== Planning ==
=== Operational goals ===
The Mogilev offensive had two main goals within the context of Operation Bagration:

- The liberation of the city of Mogilev, an important transport hub.
- To pin down the bulk of the German Fourth Army's forces while the parallel Vitebsk–Orsha and Bobruysk offensives, to the north and south respectively, set up a major encirclement. The Fourth Army, unable to disengage, would be bypassed and trapped.

=== German intelligence ===
The XXXIX Panzer Corps before Mogilev was one of the strongest corps in Army Group Centre, with four high-quality divisions. This reflected the strategic importance of the road through Mogilev, which provided the main route through the marshes in the region. However, as with the other German armies involved in Operation Bagration, the Fourth Army was unprepared for a major offensive, as the Oberkommando des Heeres expected that the main Soviet offensive would be against Army Group North Ukraine.

Shortly before the attack began, a battalion commander in the 12th Infantry Division raised concerns about a possible attack with General Martinek, who was on a tour of inspection. Martinek agreed but in response cited the proverb "Whom God would destroy, he first strikes blind": the concerns were not passed on.

== Deployments ==
=== Wehrmacht ===
- Southern flank of Fourth Army (General Kurt von Tippelskirch)
  - XXXIX Panzer Corps (General Robert Martinek)
  - XII Corps (General Vincenz Müller)
  - Reserve: Panzergrenadier-Division Feldherrnhalle

The city of Mogilev had been designated a Fester Platz, or fortified area, under the command of Generalmajor Gottfried von Erdmannsdorff.

=== Red Army ===
- 2nd Belorussian Front (Colonel-General Gyorgy Zakharov)
  - 33rd Army (Lieutenant-General Vasily Kryuchenkin)
  - 49th Army (Lieutenant-General Ivan Grishin)
  - 50th Army (Lieutenant-General Ivan Boldin)
  - 4th Air Army

== The offensive ==
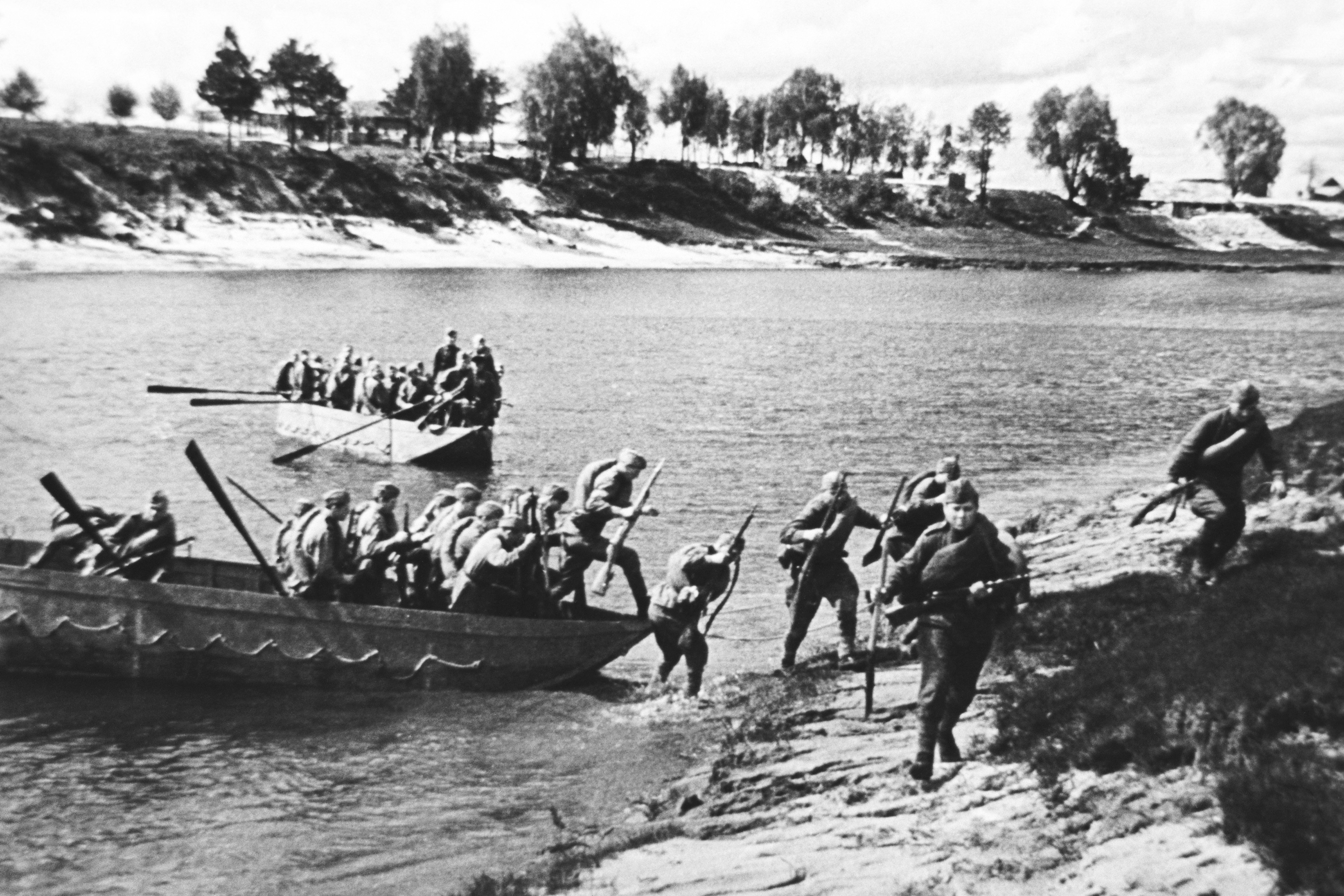
Soviet troops forcing the Dnieper

As with the other offensives in the first phase of Operation Bagration, the Mogilev offensive opened with an intense artillery barrage against the German defensive lines on the morning of 23 June.

East of Mogilev itself, General Robert Martinek's XXXIX Panzer Corps (made up of the 31st, 12th, 337th and 110th Infantry Divisions), attempted to hold its lines in the face of a ferocious assault by Grishin's 49th Army during which the latter suffered heavy casualties. The Fourth Army commander, von Tippelskirch, requested that Martinek be allowed to withdraw to the 'Tiger' line late on 23 June; this was refused, although the reserve Panzergrenadier-Division Feldherrnhalle was ordered forward to take up positions on the Dnieper river in preparation to cover a possible withdrawal by the frontline divisions. The southernmost German corps, General Vincenz Müller's XIIth, (with the 18th Panzergrenadier Division, 57th and 267th Infantry Divisions), also began to pull back to the second defensive line.

The 49th army forced the Dnieper crossings on the evening of 27 June; two divisions (the 290th and the 369th), fought their way into the town during the night, while mobile units of the 23rd Guards Tank Brigade enveloped the garrison from the northwest.

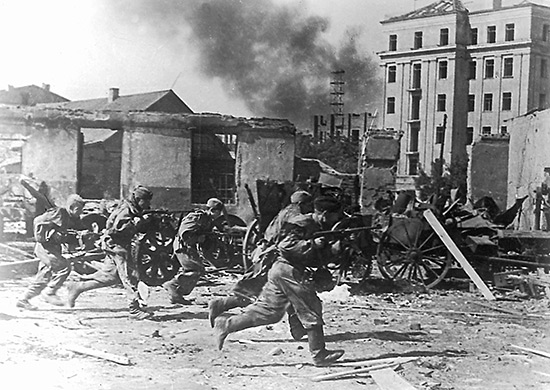
Troops of the 49th Army during the liberation of Mogilev on 28 June 1944

Mogilev, along with its town commander, Generalmajor von Erdmannsdorff, (later executed by the Soviets for war crimes) and most of the 12th Infantry Division who had been instructed to defend the town to the last man, fell into Soviet hands on 28 June. During the day both the German XII Corps and XXXIX Panzer Corps (whose commander, Martinek, was killed that evening in an air attack), began falling back towards the Berezina crossings. As the roads were clogged with fleeing civilians and military units, and were also under heavy air attack, progress was slow.

== Consequences ==
The Mogilev offensive fulfilled all its immediate objectives; not only was the city itself taken, but the Fourth Army was successfully prevented from disengaging in time to escape encirclement in the Minsk offensive, which commenced immediately afterwards.

== Personal accounts ==
- Soviet author Lev Kopelev served as an interpreter during the offensive and discussed his experiences in To Be Preserved Forever (Хранить вечно).
- Heinz-Georg Lemm, later a senior officer in the post-war German military, led one of the few units of the 12th Infantry Division to escape the encirclement of Mogilev.
