= 71st Infantry Division (Wehrmacht) =

- 71. Infanterie-Division
- Active: 26 August 1939 – May 1945
- Country: Nazi Germany
- Branch: Army
- Type: Infantry
- Role: Infantry
- Size: Division
- Nicknames: Lucky one Cloverleaf Division
- Engagements: World War II: Siegfried Line; Battle of France; Battle of Kiev; Battle of Kharkov; Battle of Stalingrad; Operation Achse; Battle of Monte Cassino

Commanders
- Notable commanders: Karl Weisenberger; Alexander von Hartmann

The 71st Infantry Division Kleeblatt ("Cloverleaf Division", "Lucky One") (German: 71. Infanterie-Division) was an infantry division of the German Army, raised on 26 August 1939, shortly before the outbreak of World War II, as a division of the 2nd wave of deployment by Infantry Commander 19 (Infanterie-Kommandeur 19) in Hildesheim. It fought in Verdun, Stalingrad and Monte Cassino, among others.

The division's symbol was the four-leaf clover and after congratulations on the victory in Verdun in June 1940, the division was henceforth called the "lucky one". The same action also earning Generalleutnant Karl Weisenberger the Knight's Cross of the Iron Cross on 29 June 1940 by Generalfeldmarschall Ernst Busch.

== Divisional history ==
In the divisional history of the 71st Infantry Division, a distinction is made between the line-up and personnel composition up to the Battle of Stalingrad as a caesura on the one hand, and the complete new line-up after the annihilation in 1943 on the other. Divisional strength was 15,000 men.

=== Deployment ===
- Siegfried Line (September 1939 – May 1940)
- France (May 1940 – June 1941)
- Eastern Front (June – October 1941)
- France (October 1941 – April 1942)
- Eastern Front (April – August 1942)
- Battle of Stalingrad (August 1942 – January 1943)
- Denmark (March – August 1943)
- Slovenia (August – September 1943)
- Italy (September 1943 – December 1944)
- Hungary and Austria (December 1944 – May 1945)

== Mobilization in 1939 ==
In August 1939, the 71st Infantry Division was set up in Military District XI (Wehrkreis XI) and was mainly recruited from soldiers from what is now Lower Saxony: Hanover, Hildesheim, Braunschweig and the western Harz. Mainly those born between 1910 and 1920 were drafted, with a divisional strength of 15,000 men. Mobilization took place on 25/26 August 1939 by Infantry Commander 19 (Infanterie-Kommandeur 19) in Hildesheim under the code word "Sigurd 9757". In spring 1939, under Colonel Wolf, Infantarie-Regiment 211 (IR 211) was already prepared for combat operations as Training Infantry Regiment 1 (Übungs-Infanterie-Regiment 1) at the Bergen military training area and was assigned a section on the Siegfried Line. The training in the army's rear area consisted mainly of weapon operation, combat field training, silent approach, movement in the dark and shooting. The first division commander was Generalmajor Wolfgang Ziegler in Hildesheim, former commander of the 19th Infantry Division. The positions of regimental commanders were filled with experienced officers from the First World War. Shortly after the general mobilization, the remainder of the 71st Infantry Division was moved to Pirmasens in night marches to secure the border, in order to move into their deployment zone for the Western campaign in France.

== Western Front 1940 ==
After the 71. ID had marched southwest through Luxembourg and southern Belgium, they crossed the Chiers River and followed into the Maginot Line. The fighting accumulated in the attack on the tactically significant Height 311. This made the 71st Infantry Division one of the first units to surmount the Siegfried Line. On May 18, 1940, the division continued its advance in cooperation with engineers and tank hunters (panzerjäger) by taking the village of Villy, the 505 tank factory and other fortifications in the La Ferté area (Maginot Line).

Together with the IR 188 subordinated to the 71st Infantry Division, Olizy and the Height 342 were captured. The period between May 21 and June 10, 1940, was characterized by defensive battles on the Maginot Line, which was further expanded to protection against counter-attacks. By May 22, 1940, seven officers and 170 NCOs and rankers had been reported dead. At the beginning of June 1940, in the Bois d'Inor forest, also known as the “Green Hell” (Grüne Hölle), numerous counter-attacks by Moroccan Tirailleurs and Foreign Legionnaires had to be fought off before the division could move east of the Meuse into the Verdun area. On June 15, 1940, the 71st Infantry Division was ordered to take Fort Vaux and Fort Douaumont, with IR 211 bearing the brunt of the attack. The attack succeeded under the leadership of the battalion commander Hauptmann Corduan, who fought in Verdun during the First World War. The fall of the two fortresses opened the way to the Verdun citadel, which fell after Fort Froide Terre was taken.

In the course of June 1940 the 71st Infantry Division pursued the retreating enemy across the Moselle to Nancy. The mission on the Western Front ended with the bestowal of numerous awards: the Knight's Cross of the Iron Cross was awarded to Generalleutnant Karl Weisenberger, Oberst Hans-Karl von Scheele (commander of Infanterie-Regiment 191), Oberleutnant Germer and Unteroffizier Pape.

Between 1940 and 1941 the 71st Infantry Division served as a training division (Lehr-Division) at the Königsbrück military training area.

== Eastern Front 1941–42 ==
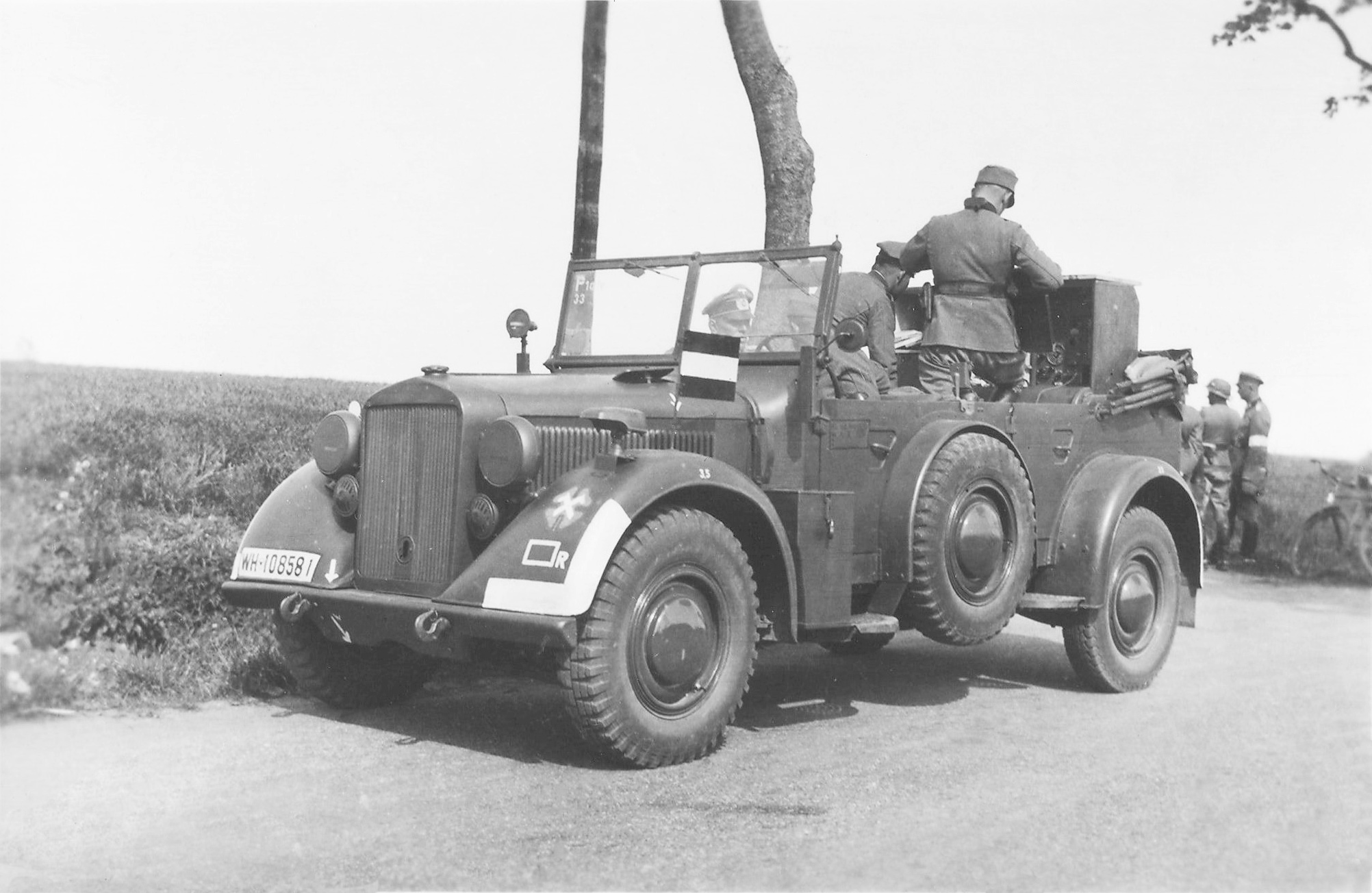
Einheits-PKW der Wehrmacht Horch 901, regimental command car. The troop identification cloverleaf shows that they belong to the 71st Infantry Division, date and location unknown.

From June 1941 the 71st Infantry Division took part in the attack on the Soviet Union and surprisingly broke into the Soviet border fortifications near Niemstow on June 22, 1941. On June 24, 1941, a defensive battle against 50 Soviet tanks developed near Niemirow, with them firing from hidden positions against the German infantrymen. Further positions of the Red Army on the Wiszenka military training area were cleared up and defeated. At the end of June 1941 the breakthrough on the northern positions of Lemberg was achieved. For almost the entire month of July 1941, the division managed a lengthy period of marching through Ukraine within the framework of the army reserve (Armeereserve), which was made difficult by bad weather and unfavorable terrain.

=== Battle of Kiev 1941 ===
As part of the 6th Army, the 71st Infantry Division was to form the focal point (Schwerpunkt) of the offensive on Kiev, which expanded into the Battle of Kiev. Long periods of rain made the roads impassable and thus delayed the advance. The battle for Kiev was initiated by taking the towns of Ksawerowka (IR 211), Marjarowka (IR 194) and Gelenowka (IR 191). Between the divisional borders of the 99th Light Division and the 95th Infantry Division, the 71st Infantry Division stormed the southern sector off Kiev. The attack was delayed by a line of bunkers along the river Weta, which were penetrated in stubborn fighting in early August 1941 and the XXIX Army Corps opened access to Kiev. Between August 10 and 24, 1941, the Red Army carried out major counter-attacks against the lost Vasa position, but they all failed.

Here the 71st Infantry Division was replaced by the 296th Infantry Division and received a new 60-kilometer-wide combat section in the western sector of the heavily fortified city of Kiev on the banks of the Irpen River. On September 16, 1941, the XXIX Army Corps launched a major attack on Kiev, which ended three days later with the encirclement of the Red Army and the capture of the city. The 71st Infantry Division itself was not involved in the capture and was transported to its new operational area.

=== Battle of Kharkov 1942 ===
On April 5, 1942, the Order No. 55616/42 of the OKW/WFSt opened the summer offensive on the Eastern Front. To this end, the 71st Infantry Division, which was relocated from France back to the Eastern Front in April 1942, received the order in conjunction with the 6th Army to push in the Soviet frontline south of Kharkov and to relocate the main battle line to the Donets area in order to create a new starting position for Army Group South.

While IR 211 supported the 294th Infantry Division in defensive tasks in Ternowaja, the other two regiments moved into their starting lines. Meanwhile, the Red Army broke through with a massive infantry and tank deployment as well as numerically superior deployment of personnel and materials near Peremoga east and southeast of Kharkov and tied up large parts of the German units. Units of the 71st Infantry Division defended the area north of Izium on the Donets. The German formations succeeded, inter alia, to encircle the 6th and 57th Soviet Armies. The resulting spring battle of Kharkov from May 17 to 24, 1942 ended with the defeat of the Red Army.

This was followed by taking up the defensive positions on the babka. Then the division advanced through Nikolayevka into the Oskol sector. The unit took part in pursuit battles via Belovodsk, Morozovskaya, the Tschir to the Don at the Generalow sector. Further defensive battles developed to the west of Kalatsch. From August 1942 the infantrymen of the 71. ID crossed the Don, took Karpovka and Rossoschka until they finally reached Stalingrad.

== Advance on Stalingrad 1942 ==
On September 3, 1942, General Friedrich Paulus had the following armed forces available for the conquest of Stalingrad: 30,000 soldiers of the LI. Army Corps (389th, 295th and 71st Infantry Divisions) and 50,000 soldiers of the 4th Panzer Army, XXXXVIII. Panzer Corps and IV Army Corps (24th Panzer Division, 14th PD, 29th Motorized Infantry Division, 94th Infantry Division and the Romanian 20th Infantry Division); a total of 80,000 soldiers. The LI. Army Corps with the 71st Infantry Division under Major General Alexander von Hartmann was to fight its way through the western and northwestern suburbs to Stalingrad. This route was the shortest and easiest from the outer to the inner defensive ring of Stalingrad. On the evening of September 3, 1942, the 71st and 295th Infantry Division moved east, capturing Gumrak station in the fight against the Soviet 2nd Tank Corps (Major General Andrey Kravchenko) and the Soviet 112th Rifle Division (Colonel Ivan Yermolkin). They drove the 23rd Tank Corps under Major General A. F. Popov and the 399th Rifle Division under Colonel Nikolai Grigoryevich Travnikov to the east towards Konnaia station. The aim was to concentrate the main forces for the attack on the Gorodishche and Mamayev Hills. Infantry Regiments 211 and 194 broke through the defensive lines of the Soviet 112th RD, while on the right wing IR 191 overran the trenches of the 196th RD under Colonel Polikarpov and captured Talowoi and the Opytnaia and Eschowka stations.

This led to great losses on the part of the Red Army, which responded to the German advance with a counterattack at the Stalingrad hospital. The impact wedge of the 71st Infantry Division fought its way deep into the lines of the 62nd Army south of Gunmrak and "literally wiped the 87th and 196th RD out of the battle line of the Soviet troops". In the region around Gumrak there were then a number of other defensive battles against the remnants of the 112th RD, 196th RD and 87th RD.

On September 4, 1942, Major General Anton Lopatin ordered a counterattack to prevent the 71st Infantry Division from gaining a foothold on the eastern bank of the Tsaritza. The Soviet 244th RD encountered Infantry Regiment 191, which had occupied the surrounding heights and had approached the city center along the Tsaritza for 4 km. Lopatin falsely reported that Afanasiev's troops had destroyed a large part of the IR 191. On September 8, 1942, 295 ID and 71 ID continued their advance from Gorodishche and Razgulaewka on the main road from Gumrak to Stalingrad and pushed back hundreds of Red Army soldiers of the 87th RD, 42nd RB and a regiment of the 244th RD to the vicinity of the hospital and the motor tractor station north of the Tsaritza; heavy fighting developed around Razgulaewka. As a result, the 87th Rifle Division soon had only 140 soldiers. Hartmann's 71st Infantry Division recorded only minor terrain gains between the hospital and the Tsaritza. In the meantime the three infantry regiments of the division had to muster all their strength to cover the trenches of the 42nd RB and 244th RD, ready for the assault.

The battle for the Stalingrad suburbs reached its climax on September 12 and took place mainly around the 1.5 to 3 km wide hilly terrain in the west and north of the city between Gorodishche, Alexandrowka, the Razgulaewka station and the hospital. On the evening of September 12 the fighting subsided, the 6th Army was in possession of the tactically important mountain ranges, while the Soviet 62nd and 64th Armies in particular suffered heavy losses in the defensive battle.

=== Organization of the 71st Infantry Division on September 12, 1942 ===
Before the offensive on the city of Stalingrad, the 71st Infantry Division had its starting position west of the "Red October" steel factory and the Tsaritza River, opposite it the 6th Tank Brigade, the 42nd Rifle Brigade and a rifle regiment of the 244th RD. The 295th ID and 71st ID received orders from the hospital to advance directly to downtown Stalingrad.

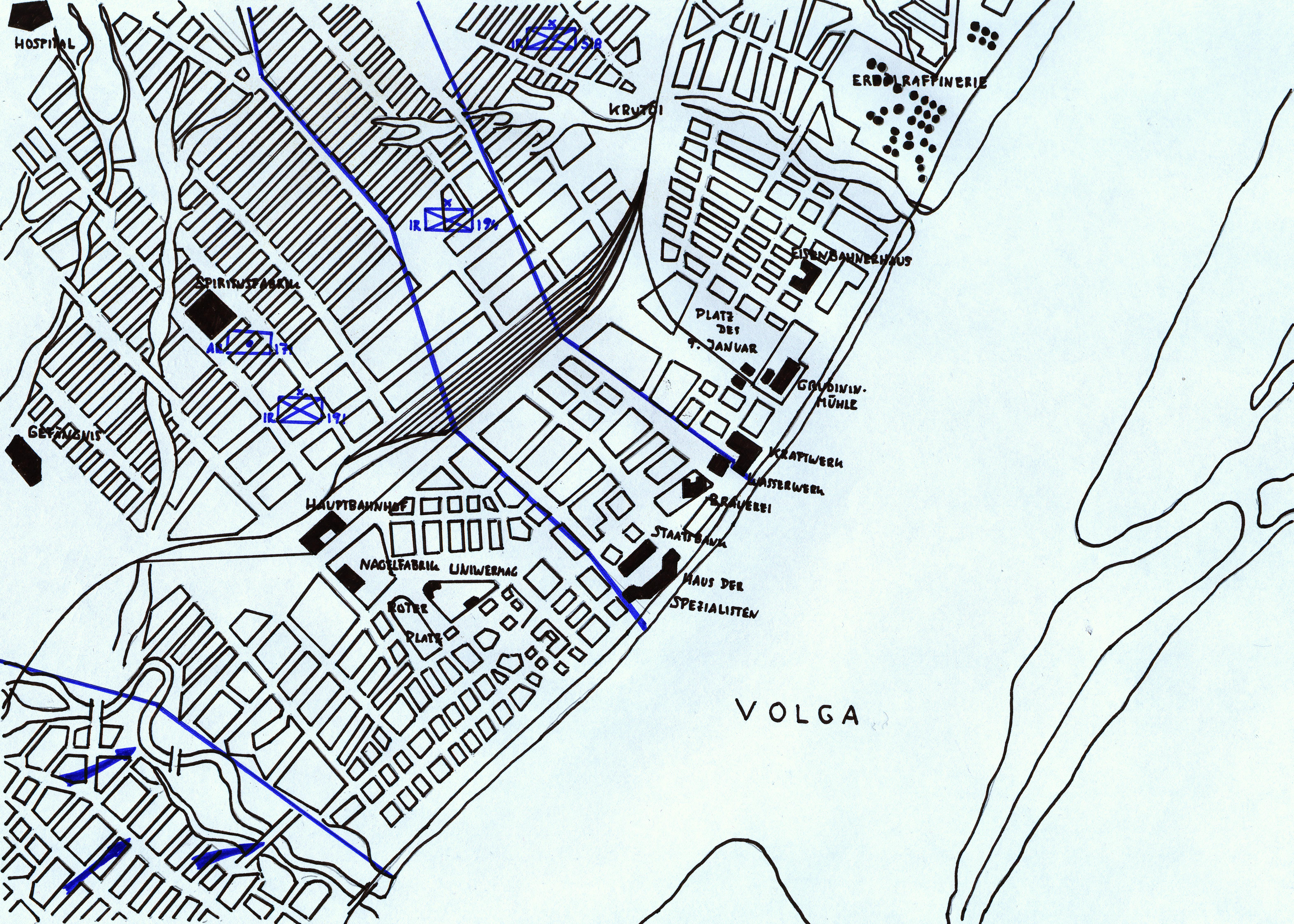
Stalingrad center with the battle dispositions of IR 518, IR 194 and IR 191.

Colonel Friedrich Roske issued the order to his unit that a quick capture of the Volga and a victorious conclusion of the fight against the Red Army would also mean an early termination of the Eastern campaign:

“We stand in this phase of the struggle, which is of exceptional importance for the war and especially for the Eastern campaign. The whole world looks at the troops from Stalingrad and besides, the quick and victorious conclusion of the battle with the reaching of the Volga also means a conclusion for the regiment. The troops are to be advised of this. I expect the whole regiment to be extremely strained, which will be worthy of the achievements of the IR 194 so far." – Colonel Friedrich Roske, Regiment Commander 194th Infantry Regiment.

A similar order of the day was issued for the soldiers of the 191st Infantry Regiment:

“Soldiers of the 71st Division! We are approaching the climax of the Battle for Stalingrad. Forward to the Volga! Everything for Germany! Then we will take Stalingrad!" – Captain Fricke, battalion commander 2nd Battalion/191st Infantry Regiment.

== Deployment in the city center of Stalingrad September 1942 ==
The 71st Infantry Division, together with the 295th Infantry Division, was one of the first large formations to reach their destination on the Volga. Due to the concentric waves of attack on the city center, the wedges of the 71st Infantry Division were greatly thinned out and thus predestined targets for Soviet snipers. The first target was reached by reaching the ridge around the "brickworks" and the starting position was created for a rapid advance into the city center. In the city of Stalingrad itself, the division quickly became involved in the heavy house-to-house fighting in the city center and had to learn local combat under difficult combat conditions, which led to heavy losses.

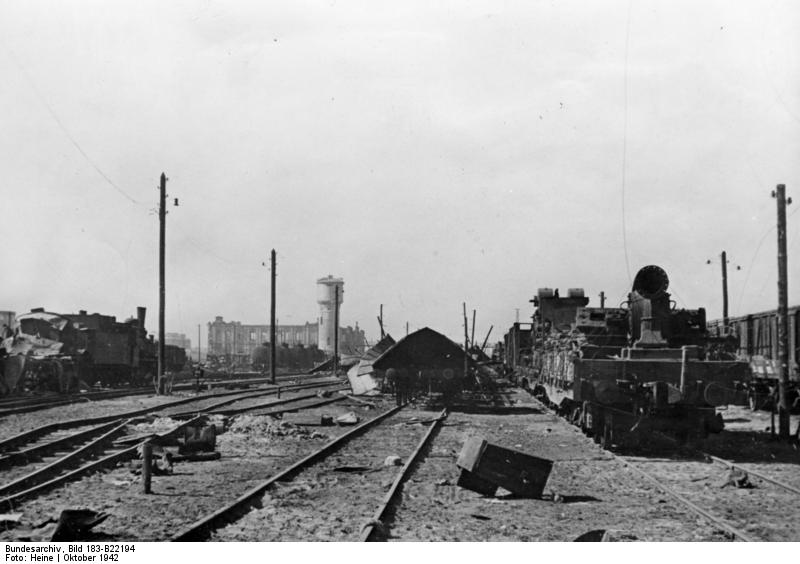
The conquered Stalingrad-1 train station October 22, 1942.

The 71st Infantry Division pressed the Soviet defending units against the hills of the city and south towards the Tsaritza. At nightfall, IR 194 took Aviagorodok, approached 2 km of the railway line and reached the entrances from Hill 112.5 while IR 211 and 191 pushed the Red Army into a promontory northwest of the Tsaritza. On September 13, 1942, the 71st Infantry Division advanced with massive air support from dive bombers in the direction of the main station and the next day they reached the city center of Stalingrad north of the Tsaritza. The struggle for the inner city developed into a merciless and extremely confusing battle, which was fought with great fanaticism on both sides around the main station, the government and party buildings and the Red Square with mutual successes. In the afternoon, a series of Soviet counter-attacks with the support of 3 Katyusha rocket launcher regiments south of the Razgulyaevka station as far as the Tsaritza were supposed to defuse the situation, as 295. ID and 71. ID were in position just before the city center and the Mamayev Kurgan.

Artillery support and air strikes by more than 60 dive bombers brought the Soviet counter-offensive to a complete standstill at dawn on September 14, 1942. At the same time, Infantry Regiments 194 and 211 broke the resistance of the 42nd Rifle Battalion Batrakov and captured Hill 112.5. Shock troops from IR 194 broke into the streets of the city center and stood in front of Stalingrad Central Station at around noon. Chuikov reported:

"Individual groups of submachine gunners moved east in the Balkas around Hill 112.5, infiltrated the city center from 2 p.m. and stood in front of the main station at 4 p.m."

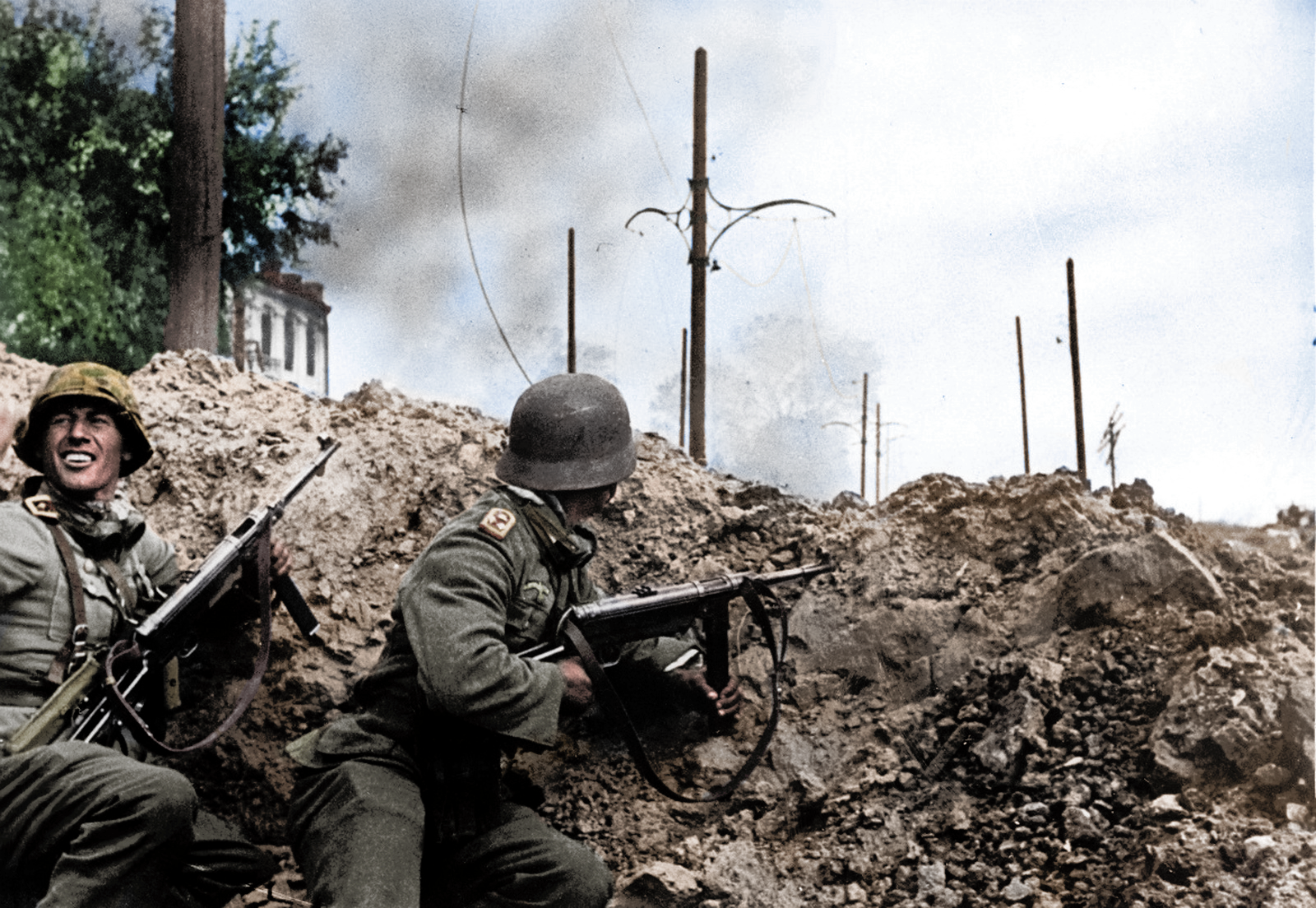
German soldiers of the 24th Panzer Division in action during the fighting for the southern station of Stalingrad, September 15, 1942.

The rapid advance of the 71. ID seemed to take the 62nd Army completely by surprise and forced them to mobilize all available reserves and throw them into the decisive battle. Important communication links were cut and supplies were cut off, and yet the German soldiers only reached the Volga for a short time. IR 194 threatened the ferry terminal and sank 2 Volga ferries. The fact that Stalingrad did not fall on September 14, 1942, was among other things owed to the resistance of the 35th Guards Rifle Division in the south of the city, which effectively stopped the 29th Motorized Infantry Division during their advance on the center. The 13th Guards Rifle Division, which arrived on the night of 14 to 15 September 1942, prevented the complete conquest of the city center by reclaiming the streets and buildings (railway depot, state bank) east of the main station and intervening in the battle on the Mamayev Kurgan. The 1st Battalion from Colonel Elin's 42nd Guards Rifle Regiment occupied the main station again, while Panikhin's 34th GRR failed to take the house of specialists. The combat strength of the 71st Infantry Division was numbered as follows on September 14, 1942: 8 infantry battalions, all in weak condition (300–400 men), 1 engineer battalion (PiBtl. 171) on average (300–400).

On September 15, 1942, bitter fighting developed around Stalingrad Central Station against the 42nd Guards Rifle Regiment of the 13th Guards Rifle Division. On the same day, IR 194 continued the fight for the main station and IR 191 and 211 advanced further on the north bank of the Tsaritza. The 24th Panzer Division tried to unite with the 71st ID near the Tsaritza on September 16, 1942, and 3 tanks were mistakenly shot by PaK guns of the 71st ID. Parts of the IR 194 in association with the 295th Infantry Division fought for possession of the Krutoi and Dolgii-Balka, but without being able to drive the enemy from his well-developed positions. In the center of Stalingrad, the main forces of 71st Infantry Division (IR 194 and 211) rubbed each other in a turbulent, completely chaotic and for both sides confusing battle from house-to-house and street-to-street over a width of 3.5 kilometers with the 13th Guards Rifle Division. The fighting reached its point of culmination on September 16, 1942, in the area around Red Square between IR 194 and 2nd Btl./34th GRR and 2nd Btl./42nd GRR, in particular about the ownership of the massive buildings (Univermag department store, Gorki Theater, party building) that flanked the square as well as the main train station and Kommunisticheskaia Street:

“And farther south, the main forces of 71st Division’s 194th Regiment, with the bulk of the division's 211th Regiment on its right, engaged in a swirling and confused street-to-street and building-to-building fight with the bataillons of 13th Guards Rifle Division's 34th and 42nd Regiments in a 3.5-kilometer-wide swath of rubbled buildings and bomb-pocked streets extending from the Dolgii Ravine southward past Railroad Station No. 1 to the Tsaritza River. The heaviest fighting occurred in the vicinity of 9 January Square, where 194th Regiment's lead battalions dueled furiously with 2nd Battalion, 34th Guards Regiment, and 2nd Battalion, 42nd Guards Regiment, for possession of the hulks of buildings flanking the square, and near railroad station, where 1st Battalion, 42nd Guards Regiment, clung resolutely to the station and adjacent ruined buildings around Kommunisticheskaia street.”

The 71st Infantry Division was unable to send reinforcements to Kampfgruppe Edelsheim (24th PD) at their bridgehead at the mouth of the Tsaritza, as all divisions in Stalingrad were tied up in exhausting house-to-house fights with heavy losses. On September 17, 1942, the guardsmen gave up their positions in the main station for the time being and tried again to recapture the house of the specialists in the technicians' building. The fighting over the accesses to the Krutoi and Dolgiischlucht in the north continued, further south IR 211 and 191 with the 34th and 42nd GRR were incessantly fighting for the parks and key buildings along and east of Kommunisticheskaia Street, the firefights around the main station flickered again and the January 9th Square, only 3 blocks away from the Volga, remained a vital defense node of the 62nd Army. When dusk fell, the 1st Btl./42nd GRR penetrated the main train station and all counterattacks on the house of the specialists repulsed. In the evening, the Red Army again proclaimed victory over the German attack formations at the main station and claimed to have counted 100 dead German soldiers who had fallen on the station premises. Finally, IR 211 was able to unite with the combat groups Hellermann and Edelsheim in the Tsaritza and bring the railway bridge over the river under control. During the night, IR 191 shifted eastwards behind IR 211 and was thus able to intervene together with IR 194 in the battle for the city center.

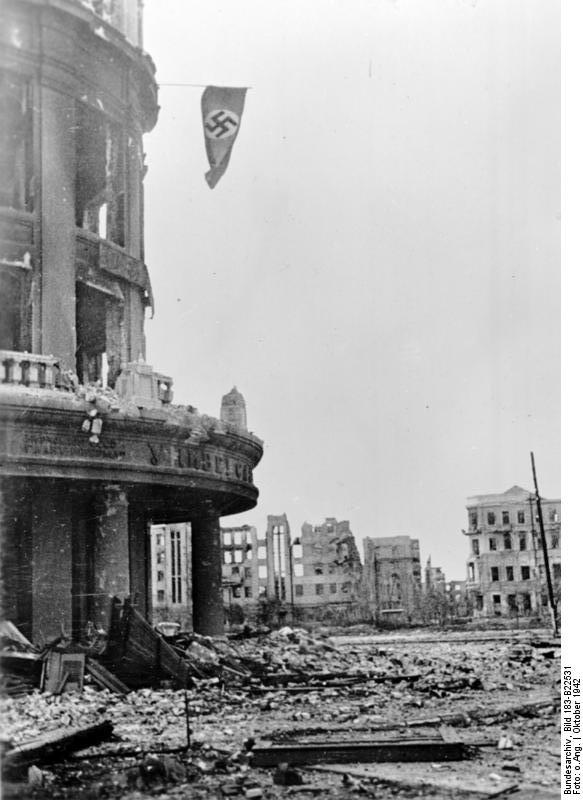
The ruins of the department store in Stalingrad, in the basement of which the command staff of the commander-in-chief, Field Marshal Paulus, was located, October 1942.

The author William Craig describes the severity of the fighting for Red Square in September 1942:

“In this square the dead lay in grotesque contortions on the lawn and the sidewalks in dark red puddles. The traces of blood from the wounded, who had dragged themselves somewhere else, formed intertwined patterns on the pavement. The 'Univermag' was just an empty ruin. Mannequins riddled with bullets lay all over the place. Dead Germans and Russians, as they had fallen, lay next to each other in the corridors. The whole department store had become a morgue. The 'Pravda' building collapsed during the air raids on August 23, 1942. There was no longer anyone in the houses of the City of Soviets and the Red Army Club or in the Gorky Theater, empty window sockets and ugly black holes yawned in the walls. The shops in the side streets were also no longer open. Rotten tomatoes and mashed watermelons lay on the sidewalks, with parts of human bodies in between, swarmed around by swarms of flies."

On September 18, 1942, the Gorokhov group's offensive in northern Stalingrad failed, so that the 6th Army could focus on fighting with the 62nd Army around the Mamayev Kurgan and the city center. Three regiments were embroiled in a swaying battle with the 13th GRD over the main station and the January 9th Square. Batrakov's 42nd RB withdrew to a defensive position west of the railway on the Tsaritza and thus tied the IR 211 again, which further exacerbated the precarious personnel situation of Hartmann's division.

On September 19, 1942, the 71st Infantry Division changed their fighting technique because the main battle line could no longer be maintained due to the heavy losses and the peculiarities of the terrain of the Balkas, as platoons and companies were reshaped like assault troops in small groups. So it was possible to attack Soviet house fortresses and defense nodes in isolation and break out of the defensive barrier. The landing of parties of the 284th RD on September 19, 1942, significantly relieved the difficult situation for the badly battered 13th GRD in the Stalingrad center and set new forces free. The high losses around Red Square and the main train station had meanwhile increased threateningly. Batrakov's 42nd RB and Afanasiev's 244th RD (fewer than 200 soldiers each) retreated to the ruined houses east of the railway line and around 1 May Square. The entire 62nd Army was in an unstoppable retreat house by house and street block by street block to the Volga during September 19.

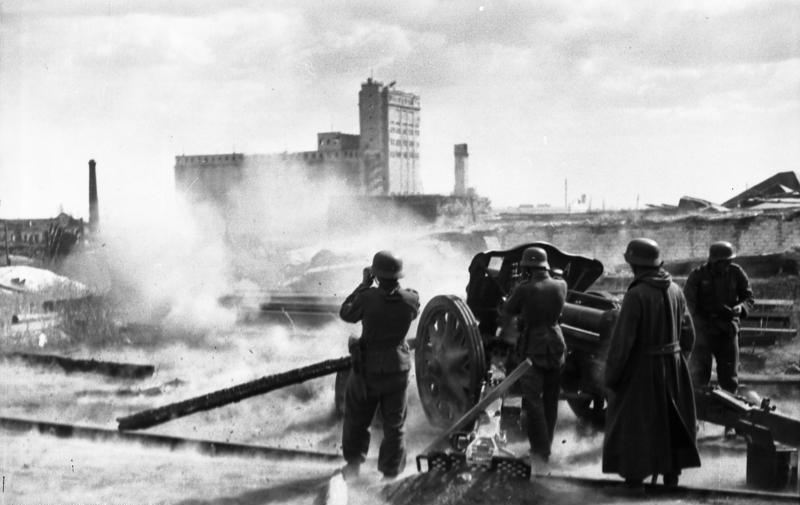
German troops in combat in southern Stalingrad. The Stalingrad grain elevator can be seen in the background.

On September 20, 1942, the 13th GRD only had small isolated “defense islands” east of the main station, 42nd GRR on the left, 39th GRR in the center and 34th GRR on the right flank. The next day the fighting concentrated on local areas in Kommunisticheskaia, Respublinskaia, Krasnopiterskaia, Stalinskaia and Naberezshnaia streets. During the fighting, an ad hoc combat group (Kampfgruppe) of around 150 submachine gunners with around 10 assault troops displaced the 1st Btl./42nd GRR from a block east of the main train station and enclosed it halfway in another block on the corner of Krasnopiterskaia/Komsomoskaia Street. In the north, another combat group of 71st Infantry Division broke through the barricades of 2nd Btl./34nd GRR and got to January 9 Square, where it was only stopped by a counterattack from Vologodskaia Street. The 42nd RB and 244th RD fought off several attacks by the IR 211 in Pushkinskaia Street; after the almost complete capture of the grain silo on September 20, 1942, they were the last active fighting troops of the Red Army in the southern part of Stalingrad.

On September 21, 1942, the grenadiers were able to successfully take a tactically important group of houses and effectively fight their way into the central ferry terminal in Stalingrad. An unknown participant reported on the final phase of the battle for downtown Stalingrad:

“Elite divisions were called in to stop the assault of the 71st. Next to the south station there was a lot of fighting for days over the grain storage facility filled with wheat [captured by the 94th Infantry Division]. In the smoke and stench of the smoldering wheat, each floor had to be conquered individually in the huge concrete block, and there was also the fact that a Soviet defensive position extended from the southern landing of the ferry to the high silo. In the division section, on October 3rd, the enemy forces fighting in the ruins of the house were so much destroyed that further neighboring sections could be taken over."

September 22, 1942, brought a renewal of the German attack on the city, against the Dolgiischlucht, the oil refinery and January 9 Square, where the Volgaufer was also reached. The guardsmen lost 200 soldiers and reoccupied Krutoi Gorge, January 9 Square, Naberezshnaia, Solnechnaia, Kurskaia, Orlowskaia, Proletarskaia, Gogolia and Kommunisticheskaia streets. After a week of street fighting, the 13th GRD only had 1,000 combat-ready soldiers; their units consisted almost entirely of small isolated units that had withdrawn in a few bombed-out houses. IR 211 used a sewer ditch to successfully reach the Volga east of the main train station and had to retreat again at night. The 1st Btl./42nd GRR was locked up in the Univermag department store on Red Square and completely destroyed; the left wing of the 13th GRD had already completely collapsed. The unabated pressure of the 71st Infantry Division caused the guardsmen to collapse all along the line. Almost the entire center, with the exception of a few pockets of resistance, had to be abandoned; only a 500 to 1000 meter wide bank could be maintained. According to the Red Army, however, 500 Germans were killed and 43 tanks (presumably assault guns) destroyed.

On September 25, 1942, the 71st Infantry Division was again involved in heavy fighting around the Stalingrad center north of the Zariza Gorge and found itself in a stalemate with the Red Army. North of the Tsaritsa, the 71st Infantry Division took possession of parts of the houses east of the party buildings as far as the Volga. In very bitter street and house-to-house fighting, the infantrymen won the ground step by step with flamethrowers, hand grenades and explosive charges, and on September 26, 1942, the 71st Infantry Division hoisted the Reich war flag on the party building on the Red Square. The 71st Infantry Division was the only one of the 6th Army in the entire division width to reach the Volga in the south of Stalingrad at the end of September 1942. The 211 Infantry Regiment was deployed on the right flank of the division between the rivers Zariza and Minina respectively. The units were therefore in well-developed and secure positions for a while, albeit heavily decimated in the city center in the September fighting.

Three infantry battalions of the 71st ID were severely exhausted and bloodied (fewer than 300 soldiers each) after the protracted and bloody fighting around the Stalingrad center on September 28, 1942, and by mid-October 1942 all infantry battalions of the 71st ID were already in the state of hors de combat and no longer able to take the remaining Soviet house-fortresses. From 14 to 26 September 1942, the 71st ID, 295th ID and 389th ID had 1,000 dead, 3,000 wounded and 100 missing.

After the fighting in the Stalingrad center had subsided, the 71st Infantry Division broke away from the concentrated attack formation and expanded into wider sections in the defensive positions on the Volga. In doing so, they were largely able to take over the existing Soviet defensive positions. IR 191 was now in the middle of the division between the Tsaritza and Minnina gorges, south of it IR 211 with the border with the 371st Infantry Division and in the north IR 194 following the 295th Infantry Division.

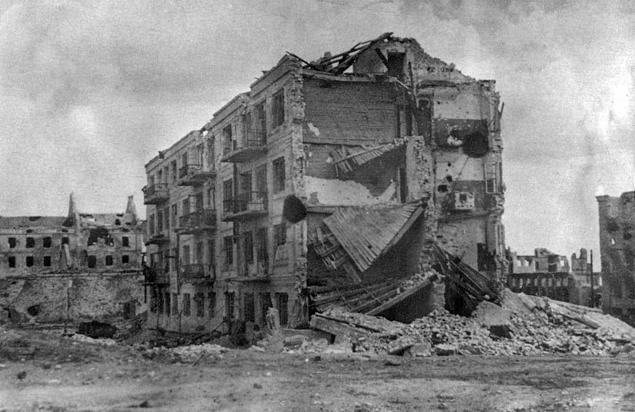
Pavlov's House, 1943.

Major General von Hartmann was given overall responsibility for the south and center sectors from the Dolgiischlucht to the Elschanka River on September 27, 1942, after the 94th Infantry Division was withdrawn for the fighting in the north. IR 211 was used from the Elschanka river to Kuporosnoe, IR 191 from the Tsaritza to the Elschanka and IR 194 from the Tsaritza to the Dolgiibalka. However, IR 194 was too weak to make any significant progress against Pavlov's House and the positions of the Red Army on the banks of the Volga and their fortresses on Krutoi and Dolgii. The impenetrable defenses of Rodimtsev in a dense network of buildings and fortresses north and south of 9 January Square were unbreakable for a single, severely weakened regiment. From September 28 to October 1, 1942, a series of unsuccessful attacks in multiple company and battalion strengths were carried out in conjunction with the 295th Infantry Division, all of which failed. On October 5, 1942, the combat strength of the 71st Infantry Division worsened to 1 weak (300–400 men) and 7 fully exhausted (300) infantry battalions.

Between October 25 and November 1, 1942, the 64th Army launched a counterstrike in the south of Stalingrad, which, however, would be repulsed. During Operation Hubertus in November 1942, the 71st Infantry Division was only able to carry out smaller raid operations.

== Destruction in the Stalingrad pocket in 1943 ==
Stalingrad, November 1942: Fire plan of the all-round defense on the orders of Colonel Roske.

On November 21, 1942, the Stalingrad pocket closed as part of Operation Uranus, when Soviet tanks took German positions near Kalach. The 71st Infantry Division received the order to entrench themselves in the city. In the urban area, Colonel Roske assigned the following defensive sections to Grenadier-Regiment 194:

- Prison: Leutnant Schölermann
- Jägerpark: Stabsfeldwebel Raboldt
- Official base: Oberfeldwebel Fraust
- Univermag department store: Leutnant Drewes
- Bazaar: Hauptfeldwebel Moser
- Riegel: Leutnant Meyer
- Children's home: Leutnant Brandenburg
- Pitomnik regimental command post: Hauptmann Röse

The bases were set up for all-round defense according to a specific fire plan, in order to maintain communications between the positions, scouting parties shuttled between the individual fighting positions connected by trenches. Landings of Soviet troops across the Volga should be prevented by chevaux de frise and mines.

On December 11, 1942, when the supply situation of the enclosed 6th Army was already very critical, the Red Army undertook further attacks in order to push the German defensive ring further inwards. On January 26, 1943, the division commander Lieutenant General Alexander von Hartmann, Lieutenant Colonel (posthumously Colonel) Kurt Wilhelm Ernst Corduan (Regimental Commander IR 191) and Major (posthumously Lieutenant Colonel) August Friedrich Wilhelm Bayerlein (Regimental Commander IR 211) were killed in a firefight at a railway embankment in the southern sector near Tsaritza. At this time, the staff of the sub-units on site was composed of 3 officers, 7 NCOs and 183 rankers. The division secured, among other things, the section between Yelschanka and Voroponovo and often had to fight with the last remaining battalions at infiltration sites. Colonel Roske, who took command of the division after the death of Hartmann, entrusted the only available officer, Captain Hindenlang, with these special tasks. In his personal notes (printed in the divisional history of the 71st Infantry Division) Roske mentioned that a total of 17,000 soldiers were found in the southern basin, of which about 2000–3000 were able to fight (kampffähig). On January 26, 1943, Paulus moved with the staff of the 6th Army into the Univermag department store, where Colonel Roske commanded the 194th Grenadier Regiment (GR 194). The remaining battalion commanders of the GR 194 were Major Dobberkau and Captain Hindenlang.

The 6th Army was divided into two parts, the north and south basins collapsed between January 27 and February 3, 1943. The 71. ID was one of the last units that was still able to fight Soviet tanks under certain conditions in January 1943. The last line of resistance of the German southern basin ran from the main station to the Tsaritza. On January 30, 1943, the Red Army captured the station area and approached the last defensive ring, which was placed within 300 meters of Red Square. Colonel Ludwig of the 14th Panzer Division surrendered around 6:00 p.m. in a corner building at the western end of Red Square in order to save the 2,000 wounded lying there. Towards evening the resistance of the GR 194 ended due to a lack of ammunition and Major General Roske (promoted 27 January) ordered the cessation of all fighting. On January 31, 1943, the remnants of the 6th Army surrendered, from the 71st Infantry Division present, Major General Roske, Major Dobberkau, Captain Hindenlang, First Lieutenant Fritz Hossfeld surrendered, and the seriously injured First Lieutenant Wegener in the Univermag department store and a little later the battery of First Lieutenant Wüster in the area of the Bathhouse on Dvinskaya Street/Karskaya Street also surrendered.

== Italy 1943-45 ==
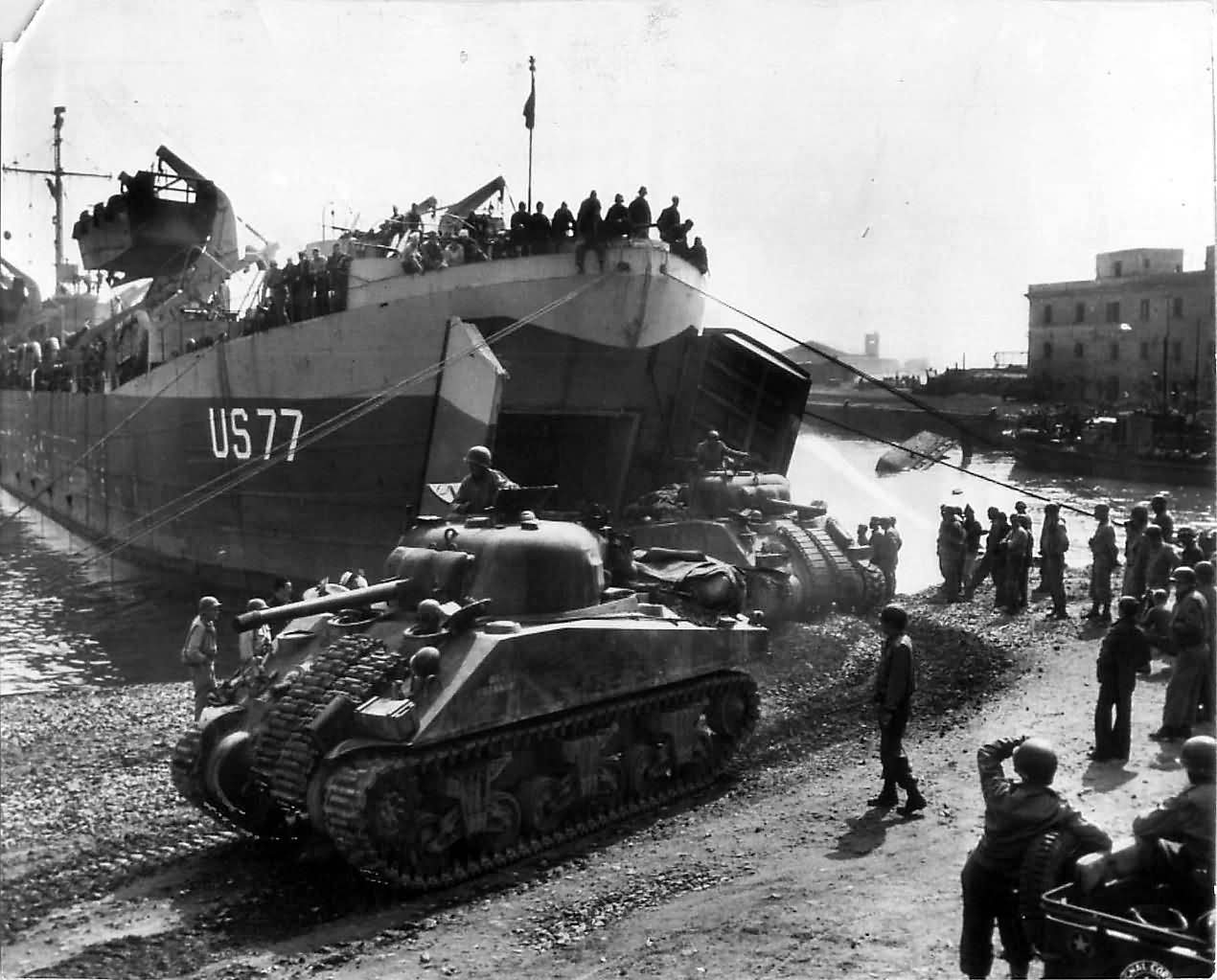
M4 Sherman tanks of the 1st Armored Division "Old Ironsides" landing from the LST US 77 in Anzio, 1944.

From March to July 1943, the 71st Infantry Division was completely reorganized in Denmark from Grenadier Regiments 883 and 885 and replacements from Wehrkreis XI, including the WK XI Unterführer course.

In August 1943, the 71st Infantry Division was transferred to Carinthia with the assignment to help disarm the Italian troops in the Treviso - Gorizia - Trieste and Fiume areas during Operation Achse. This was followed by coastal protection and partisan fighting in the Monfalcone and Fiume areas. Participation in the Battle of Monte Cassino from January to May 1944 was also significant.

Here the IR 211 defended a 4 km long section of the front in the town of Cassino and fought in hand-to-hand combat with New Zealand units for possession of the station under the command of Colonel Barnbeck. IR 194 was used in front of the US beachhead of Anzio-Nettuno until mid-February 1944. In March 1944 Major Friedrich Wilhelm Knuht and the IR 211 fought in the Third Battle of Monte Cassino for the foothills of Monti Aurunci, at Castelforte and Esperia. Major Knuht received for this engagement the Knight's Cross on 06/03/1944. He died in action on 10/03/1944. He was posthumously promoted to Oberstleutnant (Lieutenant Colonel).

The correlation of forces consisted of 6 heavily exhausted battalions of the 71. ID against 4 full-fledged divisions of the Free French Expeditionary Corps, under General Alphonse Juin, that included Moroccan mountain troops. The German resistance collapsed due to the Allied pressure and the infiltration and flanking maneuver of the French forces on the Garigliano River.

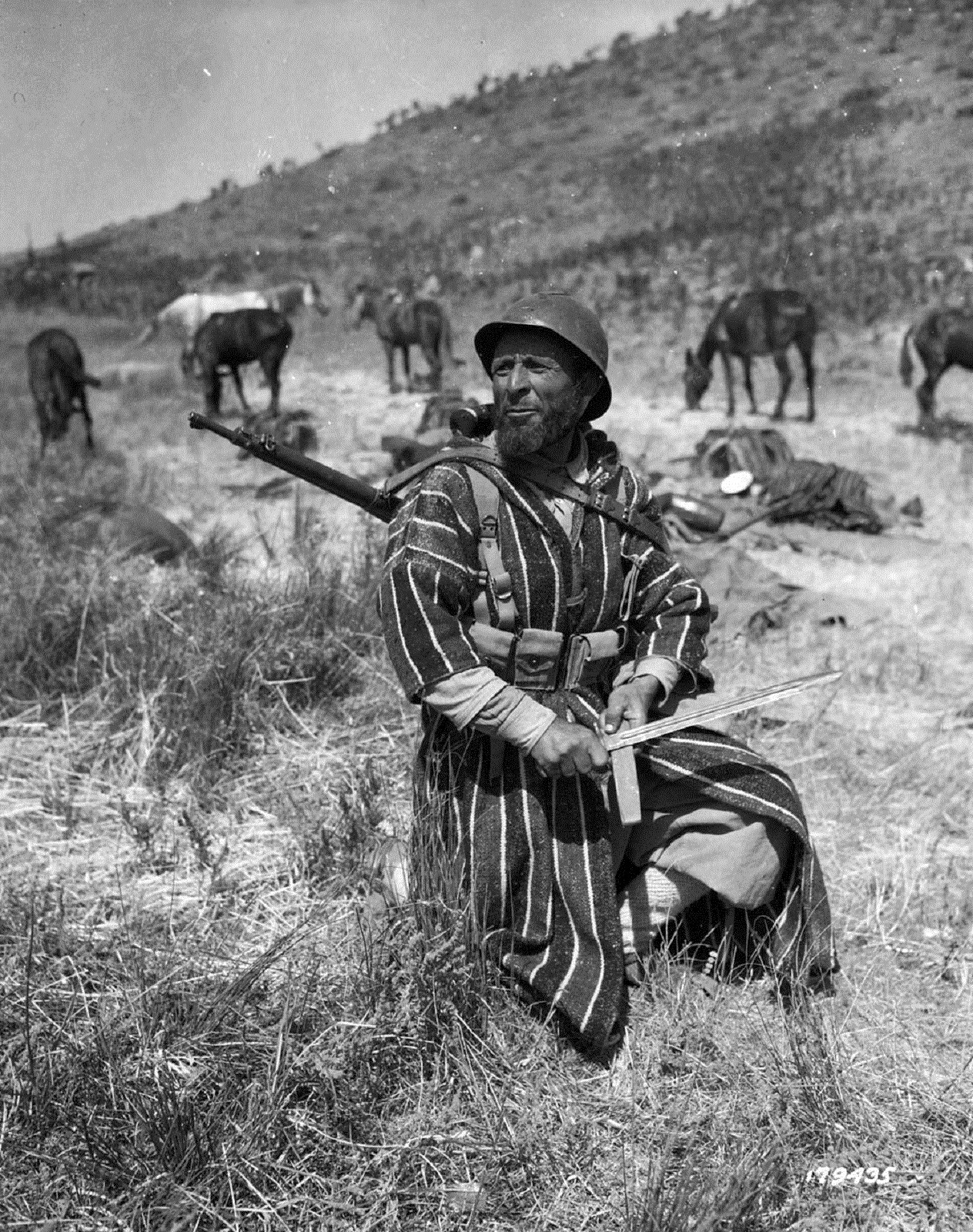
Moroccan Goumier sharpening his bayonet depicted on Yank magazine in Italy, 1944.

General Mark W. Clark described in his memoirs how the French broke through the Gustav Line in May 1944:

Meantime, the French forces had crossed the Garigliano (River) and moved forward into the mountainous terrain lying south of the Liri River. It was not easy. As always, the German veterans reacted strongly and there was bitter fighting. The French surprised the enemy and quickly seized key terrain including Mounts Faito Cerasola and high ground near Castelforte. The 1st Motorized Division helped the 2nd Moroccan Division take key Mount Girofano and then advanced rapidly north to S. Apollinare and S. Ambrogio In spite of the stiffening enemy resistance, the 2nd Moroccan Division penetrated the Gustav Line in less than two days' fighting. The next 48 hours on the French front were decisive. The knife-wielding Goumiers swarmed over the hills, particularly at night, and General Juin’s entire force showed an aggressiveness hour after hour that the Germans could not withstand. Cerasola, San Giogrio, Mt. D’Oro, Ausonia and Esperia were seized in one of the most brilliant and daring advances of the war in Italy, and by May 16 the French Expeditionary Corps had thrust forward some ten miles on their left flank to Mount Revole, with the remainder of their front slanting back somewhat to keep contact with the British 8th Army. Only the most careful preparations and the utmost determination made this attack possible, but Juin was that kind of a fighter. Mule pack trains, skilled mountain fighters, and men with the strength to make long night marches through treacherous terrain were needed to succeed in the all-but-impregnable mountain ranges. The French displayed that ability during their sensational advance which Lieutenant General Siegfried Westphal, the chief of staff to Kesselring, later described as a major surprise both in timing and in aggressiveness. For this performance, which was to be a key to the success of the entire drive on Rome, I shall always be a grateful admirer of General Juin and his magnificent FEC. The 8th Army’s delay made Juin’s task more difficult because he was moving forward so rapidly that his right flank---adjacent to the British---constantly was exposed to counter-attacks.

After the abandonment of the Cassino positions, the Abruzzo region was lost and defensive battles continued in central Italy until September 1944. Further combat missions followed in Carinthia, Italy and Hungary until the end of the war. In northern Italy, the 71st Infantry Division was stationed on the Metauro River opposed to the 1st Canadian Infantry Division and the Gothic Line, where it suffered heavy losses in attritional operations. Following this, the 71st Division fought in Hungary as part of the 2nd Panzer Army in Operation Spring Awakening, the Battle of Lake Balaton from 6 to 15 March 1945.

The 71st Infantry Division surrendered to the British near Sankt Veit an der Glan in Austria.

== War crimes ==
The division has been implicated in the Tićan massacre (Višnjan, now in Croatia), on 11 September 1943, when 84 civilians were executed.

== Casualties ==
The losses reported after the Battle of France were 22 officers, 608 NCOs and 1,847 rankers.

Statistics show that this unit already suffered the heaviest losses of all units fighting in Stalingrad on September 19, 1942, on the Eastern Front. Up to that day the 211th Infantry Regiment had lost 392, the 191st Infantry Regiment 377 and the 194th Infantry Regiment 304 men. The fighting companies suffered the greatest losses, as they were worn out in house-to-house combat and could no longer be replaced. Due to the lack of official casualty reports during the entire Stalingrad campaign, the exact numbers cannot be substantiated, being estimated at 5,000 dead and 15,000 wounded.

== Organization ==
The personnel in 1939 consisted of the following divisions of the General Command XI: 19th Division Hanover, 31st Division Braunschweig and 13th Infantry Division (motorized) Magdeburg. The personnel consisted of 6% active personnel, 83% reservists I, 8% reservists II and 3% conscripts of the Landwehr. Divided into ranks, the 71st Infantry Division had a total war strength of 15,273 people, including 491 officers, 98 civil servants, 2,273 NCOs and 12,411 men. Transportation consisted in 4,854 horses, 823 horse drawn vehicles, 393 cars, 509 trucks, 3 armored vehicles, 497 Wehrmacht motorcycles and 190 sidecars.

Each of the three battalions of an infantry regiment consisted of three rifle companies with nine light machine guns each and one heavy machine gun company with twelve heavy machine guns. From April 1941 the rifle companies were upgraded to twelve light machine guns and three grenade launchers, the machine guns to twelve heavy machine guns and six medium grenade launchers.

Structure of the division:

- Headquarters.
- 191st Infantry Regiment (renamed Grenadier-Regiment 191 from October 15, 1942), stationed in Hanover-Bothfeld.
  - 1st battalion from IR 59, Hildesheim.
  - 2nd battalion from IR 73, Celle.
  - 3rd Battalion from IR 74, Hameln.
- 194th Infantry Regiment (renamed to Grenadier-Rgmt. 194 from October 15, 1942), stationed in Halberstadt.
  - 1st battalion from IR 12, Quedlinburg.
  - 2nd Battalion (III. Jäger-Bataillon) from IR 17, Goslar and Blankenburg.
  - 3rd Battalion from IR 82, Northeim.
- 211th Infantry Regiment (renamed to Grenadier-Rgmt. 211 from October 15, 1942), Burg bei Magdeburg.
  - 1st battalion from IR 33, Dessau.
  - 2nd battalion from IR 66, Burg bei Magdeburg.
  - 3rd Battalion from IR 93, Stendal and Salzwedel.
- 171st Artillery Regiment, stationed at the II. Abteilung AR 31 in Halberstadt.
  - four battalions from regular contingents AR 19, AR 31, AR 55 and AR 67.
- 171st Reconnaissance Battalion (Aufklärungs-Abteilung 171)
- from General Command XI, Cavalry Regiment from Ludwigslust and Parchim.
- 171st Anti-Tank Battalion (Panzerabwehr-Abteilung 171)
  - from Panzerabwehr-Abteilung 19, stationed in Engelbostel, near Hanover.
- 171st Engineer Battalion (Pionier-Bataillon 171), from PiBtl. 19, stationed in Holzminden.
  - personnel from PiBtl. 4 in Magdeburg and PiBtl. 51 (mot.) from Dessau-Roßlau.
- 171st Signal Battalion
- Infantry Division News Department 171 (Infanterie-Divisions-Nachrichten-Abteilung 171)
- 171st Divisional Supply Group (Kommandeur der Infanterie-Divisions-Nachschubtruppen 171)

== Commanders ==
The following officers commanded the 71st Infantry Division:

- (26 August 1939 - 15 October 1939) Generalmajor Wolfgang Ziegler
- (15 October 1939 - 15 February 1941) General der Infanterie Karl Weisenberger
- (15 February 1941 - 28 March 1941) General der Infanterie Friedrich Herrlein
- (28 March 1941 - 25 January 1943) General der Infanterie Alexander von Hartmann
- (25 January 1943 - 14 March 1943) Generalmajor Fritz Roske
- (14 March 1943 - 1 January 1945) Generalleutnant Wilhelm Raapke
- (1 January 1945 - 8 May 1945) Generalmajor Eberhard von Schuckmann

== Personalities ==
- Colonel Johannes "Hans" Schmidt, regimental commander IR 191 (born March 30, 1895, in Stettin † December 3, 1943, in Vinnitsa / Ukraine).
- Colonel Hugo Günter von Below, Ia staff officer.
- Captain Gerhard Münch, battalion commander III. Btl./IR 194.
- Major Konrad Hermann Reinhard Fredebold, battalion commander III. Btl./IR 191 (* April 20, 1896, in Hanover-Stöcken † April 1, 1976, in Hanover).
- First Lieutenant Wigand Wüster, AR 171 (born August 11, 1920, in Göttingen † January 29, 2017).
  - Wüster became known through his watercolors and war memories from the Battle of Stalingrad.
