= Karl Weisenberger =

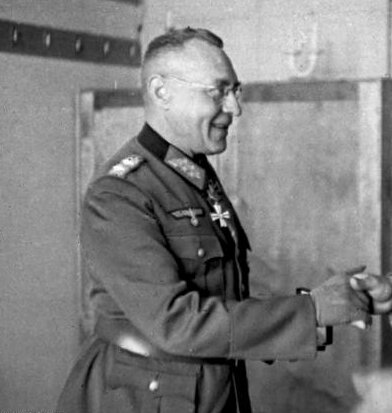
- Born: 29 September 1890
- Died: 28 March 1952 (aged 61)
- Military career
- Allegiance: Nazi Germany
- Branch: German Army
- Rank: General of the Infantry
- Commands: 71st Infantry Division; LIII Army Corps; XXXVI Mountain Corps
- Conflicts: World War II
- Awards: Knight's Cross of the Iron Cross; Grand Cross, with swords, of the Order of the Lion of Finland

Karl Franz Armin Weisenberger (29 September 1890 – 28 March 1952) was a German general during World War II. He was a recipient of the Knight's Cross of the Iron Cross of Nazi Germany.

== Awards ==
- Knight's Cross of the Iron Cross on 29 June 1940 as Generalleutnant and commander of 71. Infanterie-Division
- Grand Cross, with swords, of the Order of the Lion of Finland on 12 August 1944

Military offices
Preceded by Generalmajor Wolfgang Ziegler	Commander of 71. Infanterie-Division; 15 October 1939 – 15 February 1941	Succeeded by General der Infanterie Friedrich Herrlein
Preceded by None	Commander of LIII. Armeekorps; 15 February 1941 – 1 December 1941	Succeeded by General der Infanterie Walther Fischer von Weikersthal
Preceded by General der Kavallerie Hans Feige	Commander of XXXVI. Gebirgs-Armeekorps; 1 December 1941 – August 1944	Succeeded by General der Gebirgstruppe Emil Vogel
