= Horst Großmann =

German general (1891–1972)

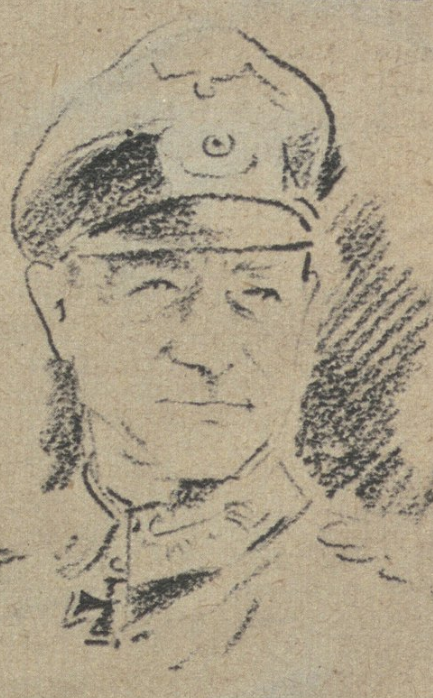
- Born: 19 November 1891; Sybba, Prussia, German Empire
- Died: 4 May 1972 (aged 80); Rüsselsheim, West Germany
- Military career
- Allegiance: German Empire; Weimar Republic; Nazi Germany
- Branch: German Army
- Service years: 1911–1945
- Rank: General der Infanterie
- Commands: 6th Infantry Division; XXXV Army Corps; VI Army Corps
- Conflicts: World War I; World War II; Invasion of Poland; Battle of France; Operation Barbarossa; Battle of Białystok–Minsk; Battle of Smolensk (1941); Battle of Moscow; Battles of Rzhev; Battle of Kursk; East Prussian offensive
- Awards: Knight's Cross of the Iron Cross with Oak Leaves

Horst Großmann (19 November 1891 – 4 May 1972) was a German general in the Wehrmacht of Nazi Germany during World War II who commanded the 6th Infantry Division. He was a recipient of the Knight's Cross of the Iron Cross with Oak Leaves.

== Awards and decorations ==
- Iron Cross (1914) 2nd Class (1 October 1914) & 1st Class (25 October 1916)
- Knight's Cross with swords of the House Order of Hohenzollern
- Hanseatic Cross of Hamburg
- Cross for Merit in War of the Duchy of Saxe-Meiningen
- Wound Badge in black
- Clasp to the Iron Cross (1939) 2nd Class (18 May 1940) & 1st Class (28 May 1940)
- German Cross in Gold on 11 February 1943 as Generalmajor and commander of the 6th Infantry Division
- Knight's Cross of the Iron Cross with Oak Leaves
  - Knight's Cross on 19 July 1940 as Oberst and commander of 84th Infantry Regiment
  - 292nd Oak Leaves on 4 September 1943 as Generalleutnant and commander of the 6th Infantry Division

Military offices
Preceded by Generalleutnant Helge Auleb	Commander of 6th Infantry Division; 25 January 1942 - 16 December 1943	Succeeded by Generalmajor Egon von Neindorff
Preceded by General der Infanterie Friedrich Wiese	Commander of XXXV Army Corps; January 1944 - February 1944	Succeeded by General der Infanterie Friedrich Wiese
Preceded by General der Infanterie Friedrich Herrlein	Commander of LV Army Corps; January – May 1944	Succeeded by General der Infanterie Friedrich Herrlein
Preceded by General der Artillerie Helmuth Weidling	Commander of VI Army Corps; 11 August 1944 - January 1945	Succeeded by Generalleutnant Ralph Graf von Oriola
Preceded by Generalleutnant Ralph Graf von Oriola	Commander of VI Army Corps; January 1945 - 8 May 1945	Succeeded by None
