= Minsk offensive =

1944 battle on the Eastern Front of World War II

- Part of Operation Bagration
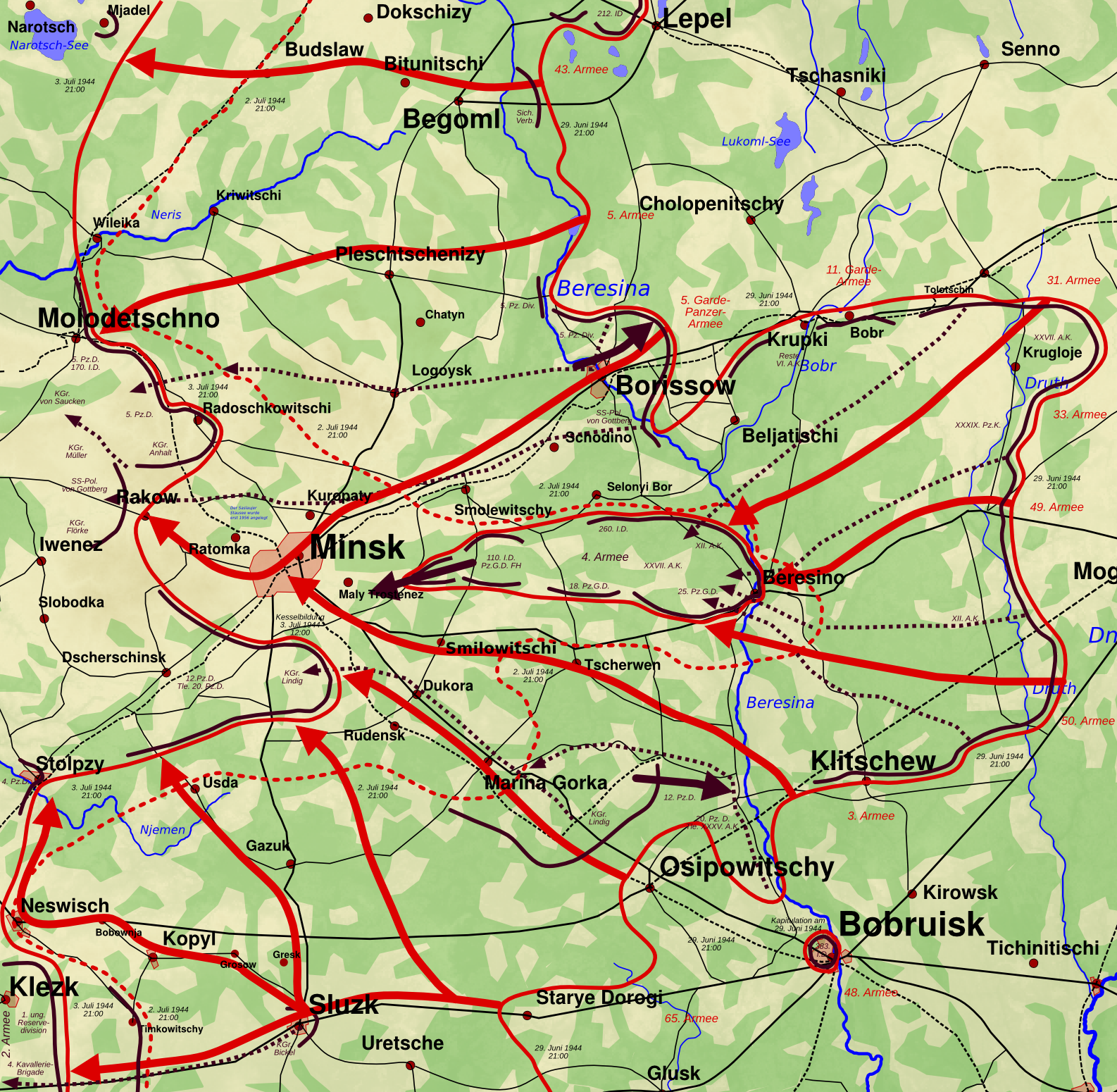
- Map of the Minsk offensive
Date	29 June – 4 July 1944
Location	Belorussian SSR, Soviet Union
Result	Soviet Victory

Belligerents
Germany	Soviet Union

Commanders and leaders
(Nazi Germany) Walter Model (Army Group Centre) (Nazi Germany) Kurt von Tippelskirch (Nazi Germany) Dietrich von Saucken (Nazi Germany) Vincenz Müller (elements of Fourth Army)	(Soviet Union) Ivan Chernyakhovsky (3rd Belorussian Front) (Soviet Union) Konstantin Rokossovsky (1st Belorussian Front) (Soviet Union) Georgiy Zakharov (2nd Belorussian Front) (Soviet Union) Hovhannes Bagramyan (1st Baltic Front)

Strength
Unknown	Unknown

Casualties and losses
100,000 troops caught in encirclement (40,000 killed or missing, rest either wounded or captured)	Unknown

The Minsk offensive (Russian: Минская наступательная операция) was part of the second phase of the Belorussian strategic offensive of the Red Army in summer 1944, commonly known as Operation Bagration.

The Red Army encircled the German Fourth Army in the city of Minsk. German dictator Adolf Hitler ordered the Fourth Army to hold fast, declaring the city to be a fortified place (fester Platz) to be defended even if encircled.

The Soviet 5th Guards Tank Army attacked from the north-east, while the 2nd Guards Tank Corps moved in from the east, and the 65th Army advanced from the south. About 100,000 Axis soldiers from the Fourth and Ninth Armies were encircled, of whom some 40,000 were killed and most of the rest captured. The result was a complete victory for the Red Army, the liberation of Minsk, and the rapid destruction of much of the German Army Group Centre.

== Role in the conflict ==
The capturing of Minsk played an important role in Operation Bagration and in WWII itself. The destruction of the 4th Army freed up more men to fight towards the end of WWII.

== Planning ==
=== Operational goals ===
The role of the 3rd Belorussian Front in the first phase of Operation Bagration was essentially complete by 28 June, when the cavalry-mechanised units halted at the Berezina. The same day, with the initial objectives fulfilled, Stavka issued a new order, No. 220124. This ordered the Front to force the Berezina from the march, and develop an offensive towards Minsk and Molodechno, capturing the former in cooperation with the 2nd Belorussian Front and reaching the latter no later than 8 July. The 5th Guards Tank Army, under General Pavel Rotmistrov was however criticized for its slowness in attaining its objectives and ordered to display greater decisiveness.

=== German planning ===
German planning largely involved damage limitation. The immediate effects of the Vitebsk–Orsha Offensive and Bobruysk Offensive made it clear that Soviet forces had the 'deep' objective of the city of Minsk. Authorisation was therefore given on 26 June to shift the 5th Panzer Division from Army Group South Ukraine to assist in the city's defence.

By the time the operation had commenced, the entire Fourth Army had been bypassed on both its northern and southern flanks. Despite this, it was ordered to hold fast. Its central corps, the XXXIX Panzer Corps, had largely disintegrated under Soviet air attack whilst attempting to reach the Berezina crossings, having lost two corps commanders in as many days.

== Deployments ==
=== Wehrmacht ===
- Encircled forces of Fourth Army under command of Lieutenant-General Vincenz Müller:
  - XII Corps (Lieutenant-General Vincenz Müller);
    - 18th Panzergrenadier Division
    - 267th Infantry Division
    - 260th Infantry Division
  - XXVII Corps (General Paul Völckers);
    - 78th Sturm Division
    - 25th Infantry Division
    - 57th Infantry Division
  - remnants of XXXIX Panzer Corps (General der Panzertruppe Dietrich von Saucken)
    - 110th Infantry Division
    - Panzer-Grenadier-Division Feldherrnhalle
- Encircled remnants of VI Corps of Third Panzer Army transferred to command of the 4th Army (General der Artillerie Helmuth Weidling)
- Encircled remnants of Ninth Army (General Nikolaus von Vormann)
- Kampfgruppe von Saucken, including:
  - 5th Panzer Division
- Kampfgruppe Lindig
  - 12th Panzer Division;
  - 390th Security Division
- Kampfgruppe von Gottberg; group of security and SS units, included:
  - Kampfgruppe Anhalt (ad hoc group of police and security units)
  - Kampfgruppe Flörke (ad hoc unit based on remnants of 14th Infantry Division and others)

The above units were under the overall command of Army Group Centre (Field-Marshal Walter Model).

=== Red Army ===
- 3rd Belorussian Front (General Ivan Chernyakhovsky)
  - 11th Guards Army (General Kuzma Galitsky)
  - 5th Army (Lieutenant General Nikolay Krylov)
  - 39th Army (Colonel-General Ivan Lyudnikov)
  - 31st Army (Lieutenant General Vasily Glagolev)
  - 5th Guards Tank Army (General Pavel Rotmistrov)
  - 1st Air Army (Lieutenant General (of Aviation) Mikhail Mikhaylovich Gromov)
- 2nd Belorussian Front (Colonel-General Gyorgy Zakharov)
  - 33rd Army (Lieutenant-General Vasily Kryuchenkin)
  - 49th Army (Lieutenant-General Ivan Grishin)
  - 50th Army (Lieutenant-General Ivan Boldin)
  - 4th Air Army (Colonel General of Aviation Konstantin Vershinin)

== The offensive ==
The offensive developed through three main phases: the breakthrough of the initial German defences along the Berezina; the advance of the Soviet motorised exploitation forces; and finally the encirclement of the German Fourth Army after the defensive positions were overrun.

=== Partisan activity ===
On the eve of the offensive, Soviet partisans carried out large-scale sabotage activities behind enemy lines, aimed at disrupting Army Group Center's logistical and communications capabilities. Some 10,500 explosives were detonated along the rail networks connecting the Dnieper to Minsk, all bridges in the area were blown up, and telephone lines extensively cut, paralyzing Army Group Center's communications for the first 48 hours of the offensive.

=== The German defence effort ===
By 26 June, OKH had finally realised that the developing Operation Bagration was the main Soviet offensive, and that Minsk was its objective. As a result, the 5th Panzer Division was brought back from Army Group North Ukraine, arriving in Minsk on 27 June with the unenviable job of attempting to halt the Soviet advance and preventing the complete collapse of Army Group Centre. For the German forces, the military situation was dire: in the Army Group's northern sector, Third Panzer Army had crumbled, with the LIII Corps wiped out, the VI Corps shattered, and the IX Corps being pushed steadily west. In the south, Ninth Army had lost all cohesion, its remaining troops being pounded by artillery and air bombardment. Fourth Army's three corps were now ordered to hold fast, despite being bypassed by Soviet forces on their flanks: Hitler declared Minsk a Fester Platz and instructed the remnants of Ninth Army to reinforce its defence.

5th Panzer, which was reorganised on 28 June into a combat group under the command of Dietrich von Saucken, took up positions near Borisov on the main road north-east of Minsk, along which elements of Fourth Army were fleeing from the front. 5th Panzer's main tank regiments, which unlike many German armoured units at the time were at full strength, were concentrated to the north, screening the rail lines being used for evacuation. The road itself was held by a rearguard of infantry, while Heavy Tank Battalion 505, equipped with Tiger Is, held the rail lines at Krupki to the east.

There were few manpower reserves in the area from which a defence could be organised. Some further reinforcements were provided by Gruppe von Gottberg, the rear-area security units of the SS-Sonderregiment Dirlewanger (responsible for a series of atrocities and war crimes in the course of their 'anti-partisan' activities). The crossing points on the Berezina southwards were defended by several police and security detachments organised as Gruppe Anhalt, and elements of divisions from Müller's XII Corps, which had fallen back on the town of Berezino.

=== The liberation of Minsk ===
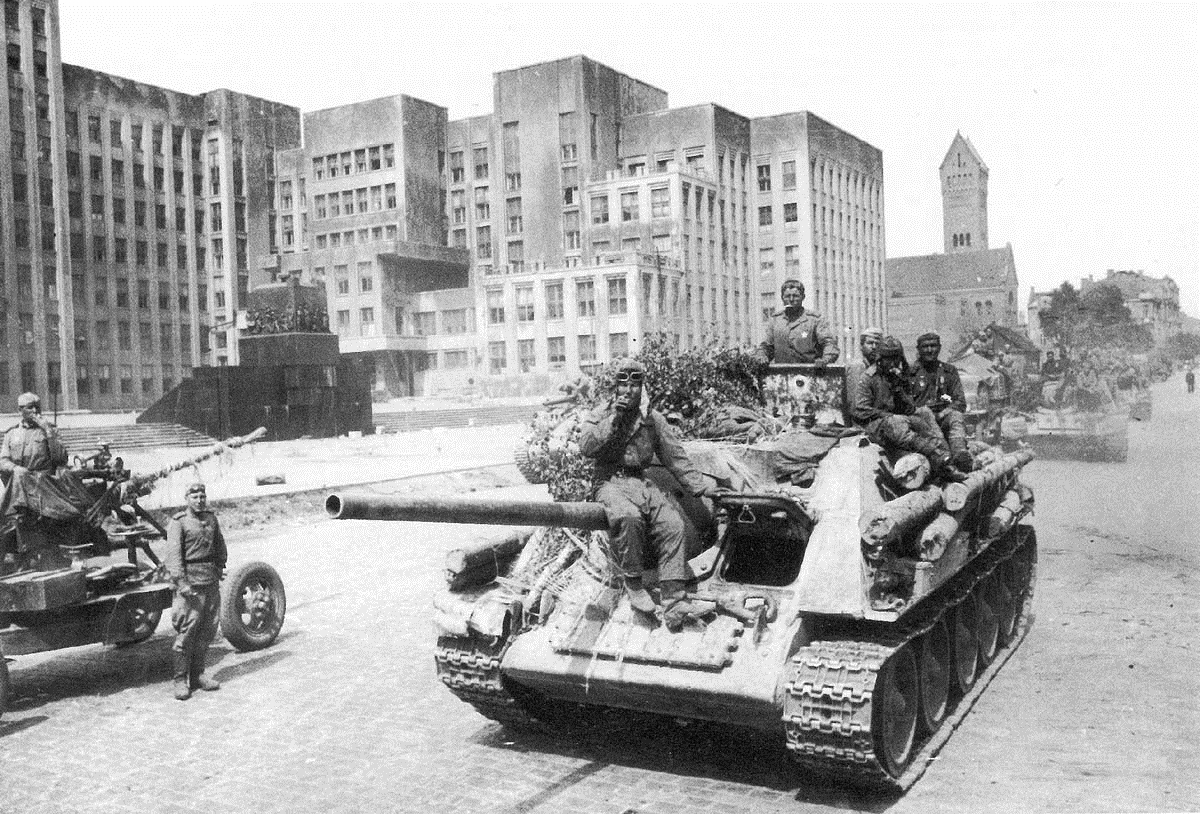
On the central square of liberated Minsk

An overturned Lanz Bulldog HR tractor and dead German soldiers on a street in Minsk, 6 July

5th Guards Tank Army was now bearing down on Minsk from the north-east (the subordinate 3rd Guards Tank Corps initially suffering some losses to 5th Panzer's heavy tank battalion at Krupki), while the Soviet 2nd Guards Tank Corps approached from the east. The bulk of 5th Guards Tank Army, accompanied by the rifle divisions of 11th Guards Army, attacked straight down the Minsk road, forcing the German infantry back into Borisov by 29 June: a screen of Soviet troops was left on the road to prevent any more elements of Fourth Army escaping into Minsk. 5th Panzer's engineers blew the bridges over the Berezina on 30 June in an attempt to deny the Soviet forces entry into Borisov. The overstretched main elements of Gruppe von Saucken now attempted to screen Minsk from the north-west, where the 5th Guards Tank Army threatened to sever the railway lines. The fall of the city seemed imminent: 65th Army was approaching from the southern route, the 5th Guards Tank Army was making progress from the north, and 2nd Guards Tank Corps had crossed the Berezina.

In the meantime, the four divisions of XXXIX Panzer Corps had begun to pull back and make for the crossings at Berezino, south of Borisov, in an effort to escape the developing trap. A column of vehicles stretched back for many kilometres, under constant air attack, as the bridge was repeatedly damaged by bombing. The replacement corps commander, Lieutenant-General Otto Schünemann, was himself killed on 29 June, and the entire corps began to disintegrate.

The elements of Army Group Centre holding Minsk began to prepare for withdrawal on 1 July, authorisation finally being given on 2 July. Von Saucken and the 5th Panzer Division were ordered to fall back towards Molodechno in the north-west; von Gottberg, after stating the defences of Minsk were collapsing, withdrew his units towards Lida. With substantial elements of Fourth Army still east of the city attempting to withdraw, the 2nd Guards Tank Corps broke through the defences of Minsk in the early hours of 3 July; fighting erupted in the centre of the city at dawn. By the next day, Minsk had been cleared of German rearguard units, while the 65th Army and 5th Guards Tank Army closed the encirclement to the west. The bulk of Fourth Army, and much of the remnant of Ninth Army, were now trapped.

=== The destruction of Fourth Army ===
Over the next few days, Fourth Army made several attempts to break out of the encirclement, led by those divisions still retaining a coherent organisational structure. The largest group of encircled forces comprised the divisions of XII Corps, which remained relatively intact, along with those elements of XXVII Corps that had successfully retreated from Orsha and which were now trapped near Pekalin (in Smalyavichy Raion, Minsk Region). The corps commanders, Müller and Völckers, decided on 5 July that their forces should break out to the north-west and west respectively, accompanied by the remnants of Martinek's former XXXIX Panzer Corps; they were now as much as 100 km behind Soviet lines.

The 25th Panzergrenadier Division acted as the spearhead for the breakout at midnight on 5 July, but was scattered, with some elements passing north of Minsk to reach German positions. The 57th Infantry Division and Panzergrenadier-Division Feldherrnhalle linked up and attempted to bypass Minsk to the south, but were also dispersed, while the same fate eventually befell the remainder of the 78th Sturm Division (after an initially successful breakout) and most of the other divisional groupings. Some elements of the 14th Infantry Division under their commander, Lieutenant-General Flörke, managed to link up with remnants of the 31st and 12th Infantry Divisions; Kampfgruppe Flörke, after finding Minsk abandoned and burning, was eventually able to escape the pocket and reach the 12th Panzer Division's positions.

Lieutenant-General Müller, who had been placed in command of all the encircled units of Fourth Army, was captured on 8 July after a failed breakout by the 18th Panzergrenadier Division. He immediately issued an order to all encircled troops to surrender, which was broadcast over loudspeakers by Soviet forces and dropped from Soviet aircraft in leaflet form. A large number of German unit commanders and soldiers chose to disregard the order, however, and continue escape attempts: Soviet forces were reporting actions against groups of encircled German soldiers several thousand strong until mid-July, and smaller groups until some time later.

In total, around 100,000 troops from Fourth and Ninth Armies were caught in the encirclement, of whom some 40,000 were killed, most of the remainder being captured. Partisans played an important role in locating and mopping up the encircled forces.

== Outcome ==
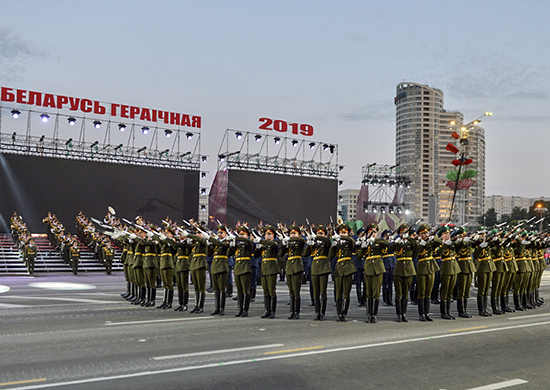
An exhibition drill routine by the Honor Guard of the Armed Forces of Belarus during a civil-military parade in honor of the 75th anniversary of the offensive, 3 July 2019.

Within the broader strategic framework of Operation Bagration, the Minsk offensive was a complete success:

- The capital of the Belorussian SSR, Minsk, was liberated after three years of German occupation.
- The forces of the German Army Group Centre were almost completely shattered within a matter of days. In particular, nearly the entire Fourth Army, plus many of the elements of Ninth Army that had escaped from the Bobruysk offensive, was destroyed.

The 3rd and 2nd Belorussian Fronts were subsequently committed to the third 'pursuit' phase of the strategic offensive in the Vilnius and Belostock offensives respectively. The offensive helped pave the way for the eventual defeat of Germany. This date is celebrated as Belarus's Independence Day, in honor of the event.
