= Alexander von Hartmann =

German general in World War II

- Born: 11 December 1890; Berlin, German Empire
- Died: 26 January 1943 (aged 52); Stalingrad, Soviet Union
- Military career
- Allegiance: German Empire; Weimar Republic; Nazi Germany
- Branch: Army
- Rank: General der Infanterie (Posthumously)
- Commands: 71st Infantry Division
- Conflicts: Battle of Stalingrad †
- Awards: Knight's Cross of the Iron Cross

Alexander von Hartmann (11 December 1890 – 26 January 1943) was a German general in the Wehrmacht during World War II who commanded the 71st Infantry Division. He was a recipient of the Knight's Cross of the Iron Cross of Nazi Germany. Hartmann was killed on 26 January 1943 during the Battle of Stalingrad and was posthumously promoted to General of the Infantry.

Before his death Hartmann stated, "I intend to go to my infantry in the front line...I will seek death among their ranks. Captivity for a general is dishonourable." He was killed instantly when he was shot in the head while standing upright on the railway embankment firing "shot after shot from his rifle."

== Awards and decorations ==
- Knight's Cross of the Iron Cross on 8 October 1942 as Generalleutnant and commander of 71. Infanterie-Division

Military offices
| Preceded by General der Infanterie Friedrich Herrlein | Commander of 71. Infanterie-Division; 28 March 1941 – 26 January 1943 | Succeeded by Generalmajor Fritz Roske |
