= Ivan Yermolkin =

Soviet military personnel (1907–1943)

Ivan Yefimovich Yermolkin
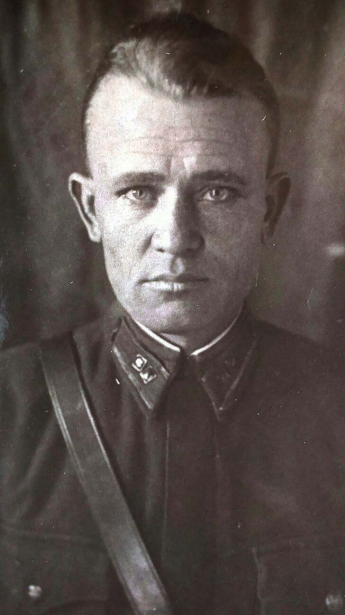
- Yermolkin, c. 1940
- Born: 25 March 1907; Orlovka, Stavropol Governorate, Russian Empire
- Died: 7 September 1943 (aged 36); Near Navlya, Bryansk Oblast, Soviet Union
- Military career
- Allegiance: Soviet Union
- Branch: Red Army
- Service years: 1931–1933; 1935–1943
- Rank: Colonel
- Commands: 112th Rifle Division
- Conflicts: World War II †
- Awards: Order of the Red Banner

Ivan Yefimovich Yermolkin (Russian: Иван Ефимович Ермолкин; 25 March 1907 – 7 September 1943) was a Red Army colonel killed during World War II, who commanded the 112th Rifle Division in the early months of the Battle of Stalingrad.

== Early life and prewar service ==
An ethnic Russian, Ivan Yefimovich Yermolkin was born on 25 March 1907 in the village of Orlovka, Stavropol Governorate. He was conscripted into the Red Army on 2 October 1931 by the Kizlyarsky District Military Commissariat of the Dagestan ASSR and sent to the one-year conscript detachment of the 28th Taman Cavalry Regiment of the 5th Cavalry Division of the North Caucasus Military District in Pyatigorsk. After completing his training in the detachment in October 1932 Yermolkin was appointed a platoon commander in the 88th Cavalry Regiment of the 12th Cavalry Division at Armavir, but left active service in 1933 on long-term leave.

Recalled by the army in November 1935, Yermolkin was sent to the Red Banner Cavalry Officers Improvement Course in Novocherkassk. Upon his graduation in March 1936 he was sent to the Transbaikal Military District, where he was appointed a squadron commander in the 155th Cavalry Regiment of the 22nd Cavalry Division at Khada Bulak. From August 1937 the regiment joined the 6th Separate Cavalry Brigade stationed in Mongolia. With the regiment, Yermolkin served as a squadron commander, assistant regimental chief of staff, and acting regimental chief of staff. From February 1940 he served in the Kiev Special Military District at Sambor as assistant chief of staff and acting chief of staff of the 148th Cavalry Regiment of the 34th Cavalry Division. In July 1940 the 34th Cavalry Division was used to form the 8th Mechanized Corps, with the 148th Cavalry Regiment being one of the units used to form the 12th Motor Rifle Regiment of its 12th Tank Division. Yermolkin became chief of staff of the newly converted regiment.

== World War II ==
After Operation Barbarossa, the German invasion of the Soviet Union, began on 22 June 1941, Yermolkin fought on the Southwestern Front with his unit. As part of the 26th Army, the division and its corps began the war in the area of Drogobych. During the Border Battles on 25 June 1941 as part of the corps the division launched a counterattack in the area of Brody and Dubno, and then in fierce fighting retreated towards Proskurov and Vinnytsia. Then-Major Yermolkin was wounded by shrapnel during fighting in the area of Radzivilov on 28 June. In August during the Battle of Kiev he was appointed commander of the 300th Motor Rifle Regiment of the 7th Motorized Division, leading it in fierce fighting south of Kiev as part of the 26th Army. Yermolkin was caught in encirclement in September but managed to return to Soviet lines in October, after which he received command of the 680th Rifle Regiment of the 169th Rifle Division, engaged in heavy fighting as part of the 38th Army of the Southwestern Front in the Volchansk region. From December he commanded the 584th Rifle Regiment of the 199th Rifle Division of the army. In July 1942 Yermolkin became deputy commander of the 304th Rifle Division of the army during the Donbass Defensive operation.

On 9 August then-Lieutenant Colonel Yermolkin took command of the 112th Rifle Division of the 62nd Army, which he led in the Battle of Stalingrad. The 112th fought in on the outskirts of the city and was ultimately pushed back and fought in urban combat inside the city itself. Yermolkin, promoted to colonel on 31 August, was accused of repeatedly reporting false information about the condition of his division and sought to have the divisional and regimental headquarters withdrawn to the left bank of the Volga. He reported the division was destroyed and had a bayonet strength of just 30, diminishing the strength of the division by 23 times as on 20 October the division numbered 638 people. In addition, his reports arguing that continued defense of Stalingrad was hopeless were considered defeatist. For these reasons, Yermolkin was relieved of command with a demotion to regimental commander on 19 November 1942.

This punishment was not carried out and Yermolkin remained without an assignment at the disposal of the personnel department of the Stalingrad Front until being appointed deputy commander of the 169th Rifle Division, now with the 64th Army of the Don Front, on 12 January 1943. In this position, he participated in Operation Koltso and the destruction of the German forces encircled in Stalingrad. His performance here was evaluated positively in combat characteristics as having "proved himself to be a brave and decisive commander". After the end of the fighting in Stalingrad, the division was withdrawn to the Reserve of the High Command, then sent to the Western Front as part of the 11th Guards Army. In July Yermolkin fought in Operation Kutuzov with the division, receiving the Order of the Red Banner for his performance during the operation. On 30 July the division and its army transferred to the Bryansk Front and continued the offensive to the south, assisting in the encirclement of German troops south of Oryol. Yermolkin was killed in fighting near Navlya on 7 September and was buried in a mass grave in the city of Navlya.
