= LV Army Corps =

German military unit during World War II

LV. Armeekorps
- Active: 6 January 1941 – 30 April 1945
- Country: Nazi Germany
- Branch: Army
- Size: Corps
- Engagements: World War II: Operation Barbarossa; Battle of Brody (1941); Battle of Kiev (1941); Voronezh–Kastornoye operation; Operation Kutuzov; Battle of Smolensk (1943); Operation Bagration; Bobruysk Offensive; Osovets Offensive; East Prussian Offensive

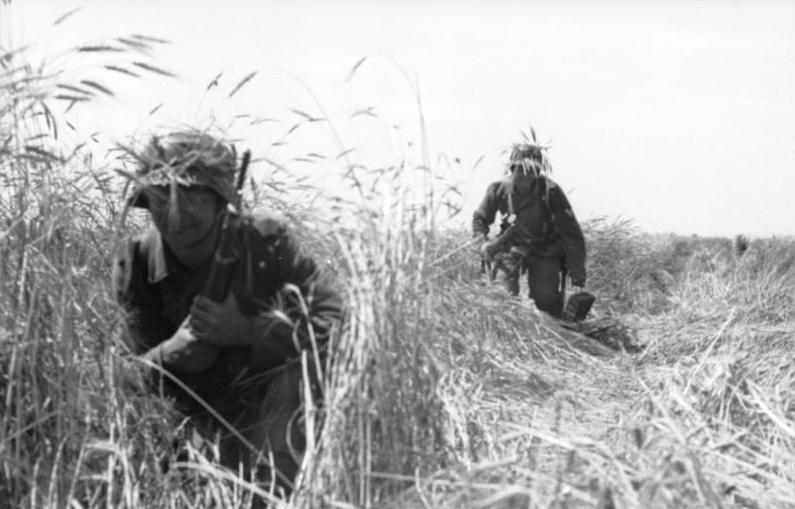

LV Army Corps (LV. Armeekorps) was a corps in the German Army during World War II.

== Operations ==
The LV Army Corps was created on 6 January 1941 in military district V (Stuttgart).

It participated in Operation Barbarossa as part of the 6th Army. It fought in the Battle of Brody (1941) and Battle of Kiev (1941). On 24 October 1941, it reached the city of Charkov of which commander General Vierow became governor. On December 27, the corps was hastily transferred to Maloarkhangelsk in the area northeast of Kursk, where the city of Liwny was lost on December 25 by a Soviet counteroffensive.

In 1942 the corps, now under the 2nd Army, was located in the region east of Maloarchangelsk in defensive/contention battles with the 13th Soviet Army (General Nikolai Pukhov) in the spring of 1942. In June 1942, the Corps advanced towards Liwny, but was halted and converted to trench warfare. In July 1942, the Corps as the left wing of the 2nd Army, was positioned on the border of Heeresgruppe Mitte and Heeresgruppe B and maintained the connection with the XXXV Army Corps of the 2nd Panzer Army.

In early 1943, the Corps was defeated in the Voronezh–Kastornoye operation and withdrew towards Oryol, where it suffered further defeats in Operation Kutuzov and the Battle of Smolensk. By the end of 1943, the Corps had withdrawn to Rahachow in Belarus, where the front stabilised. In 1944, the Corps suffered heavy casualties during the Bobruysk Offensive and Osovets Offensive as part of Operation Bagration. In January 1945, it fought against the Soviet East Prussian Offensive, ending the war defending the harbor city of Pillau.

== Commanders ==
- General der Infanterie Erwin Vierow : (6 January 1941 - 13 February 1942)
- General der Infanterie Erich Jaschke : (10 March 1943 - 4 October 1943)
- Generalleutnant Friedrich Herrlein : (5 October 1943 - 1 January 1944)
- Generalleutnant Horst Großmann : (1 January 1944 - 1 May 1944)
- General der Infanterie Friedrich Herrlein : (1 May 1944 - 5 February 1945)
- Generalleutnant Kurt Chill : (6 February 1945 - 30 April 1945)

== See also ==
- List of German corps in World War II

== Source ==
- "LV. Armeekorps". Lexikon der Wehrmacht.
