= Navlya =

Navlya (Russian: Навля) may refer to several places in Russia.

Urban localities

- Navlya, Bryansk Oblast, a work settlement in Navlinsky District of Bryansk Oblast

Rural localities

- Navlya, Oryol Oblast, a selo in Navlinsky Selsoviet of Shablykinsky District of Oryol Oblast

Rivers

- Navlya (river), a tributary of the Desna in Bryansk Oblast and Oryol Oblast
