= Ivan Grishin =

Soviet military commander

Ivan Tikhonovich Grishin
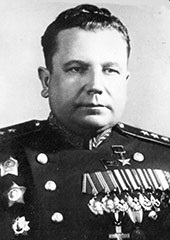
- Native name: Иван Тихонович Гришин
- Born: 16 December 1901; Vnukovichi village, Roslavl Uyezd, Smolensk Governorate, Russian Empire
- Died: 20 June 1951 (aged 49) Moscow, Soviet Union
- Buried: Novodevichy Cemetery
- Allegiance: Soviet Union
- Branch: Soviet Army
- Service years: 1920–1951
- Rank: Colonel general
- Commands: 137th Rifle Division; 49th Army; 6th Guards Army
- Awards: Hero of the Soviet Union; Order of Lenin (2); Order of the Red Banner (5); Order of Suvorov, 1st class (2); Order of Kutuzov, 1st class Order of the Red Star; Order of the Cross of Grunwald, 1st class

Ivan Tikhonovich Grishin (Russian: Иван Тихонович Гришин; 16 December 1901 – 20 June 1951) was a Soviet Army Colonel general and Hero of the Soviet Union. Grishin enlisted in the Red Army during the Russian Civil War and fought against the Tambov Rebellion. He became an officer and graduated from the Frunze Military Academy in 1936. In October 1940, he became the commander of the 137th Rifle Division, which he led through the World War II battles of Smolensk and Moscow. Grishin became 50th Army chief of staff and in April 1943 transferred to the same position in the 11th Guards Army. Soon after, he became 49th Army commander and led the army through the Smolensk Operation, Operation Bagration, the East Prussian Offensive and the Berlin Offensive at the end of the war. Postwar, Grishin commanded the 6th Guards Army. In 1946, he became the head of combat training for the Ground Forces. Grishin died in 1951 in Moscow.

== Early life ==
Ivan Grishin was born on 16 December 1901 in the village of Vnukovichi to a peasant family. He graduated from fourth grade at the rural school. After his father was drafted, Grishin left school and worked in the household. In July 1920, he was drafted into the Red Army. Grishin became a private in the 16th Reserve Rifle Regiment at Dorogobuzh. From 1920 to 1922, he studied at the 18th Infantry Command Courses in Kaluga. While a cadet, Grishin fought in the crushing of the Tambov Rebellion.

== Interwar ==
In April 1922, he became a platoon commander in the 163rd Rifle Regiment. He later transferred to become a platoon commander in the 1st Border Regiment, 12th Separate Border Battalion and 18th Border Battalion of the OGPU Border Troops. Grishin became machine gun platoon commander of the 27th Rifle Division's 81st Rifle Regiment in April 1924. In 1925, he requested to be sent to the 3rd Western Infantry School, from which he graduated a year later. Grishin then was sent to the Ivanovo-Voznesensky "Frunze" Infantry School in Oryol, from which he graduated in two years. At the same time, as an external student he passed the examination for a seven-year school. In 1927, he joined the Communist Party of the Soviet Union. Grishin became a platoon commander in the 44th Rifle Division's 132nd Rifle Regiment. He was promoted and became a company commander. Grishin soon became battalion chief of staff and the division's assistant chief of staff.

In April 1933, Grishin was sent to the Frunze Military Academy. He graduated with honors in 1936. In October, he became chief of the department of the Central Training School of the Chiefs of Staff. In September 1937, he became chief of staff of the 17th Rifle Division in the Moscow Military District. In December 1938, Grishin became head of the 2nd staff section at district headquarters. In October 1940, Grishin became commander of the 137th Rifle Division at Gorky. The division participated in the district's demonstration exercises and Grishin was awarded the Order of the Red Star for his leadership.

== World War II ==
When Operation Barbarossa began on 22 June 1941, the 137th Rifle Division was stationed at their summer camp of Gorokhovetsky. The division was sent to the front and fought in the Battle of Smolensk in early July, part of the 13th Army. Near Shkloŭ, the division defended the Dnieper crossing and delayed advancing German troops for seven days. The division then retreated back to Chavusy. The division then defended the Sozh River line and held south of Trubchevsk for two weeks. From 2–6 August, Grishin temporarily became commander of some elements of the 4th Airborne Corps. In September, the division was transferred to the Bryansk Front. The division then fought around Tula and in the Battle of Moscow. On 7 November, Grishin was awarded the Order of the Red Banner. In December, the division participated in the Yelets Offensive and reportedly advanced 150 kilometres (93 mi) to the west.

On 10 March 1942, Grishin became chief of staff of 50th Army. The army fought in the last of the Battles of Rzhev and suffered heavy losses. Afterwards, it defended the line southwest of Moscow. On 30 January 1943, Grishin was awarded the Order of the Red Banner for his leadership of the 137th Rifle Division. On 27 April 1943, Grishin became chief of staff of the 11th Guards Army. In June, he became 49th Army commander. During August and September, Grishin led the army in the Smolensk Operation. During the offensive, the army crossed the Desna, Oster and Sozh. The army also captured Spas-Demensk, Roslavl, Krichev, Khislavichi, Mstislavl and Bogdanovo, a German strongpoint on the Desna. The army received thanks from the supreme commander and received a twenty salvo artillery salute in Moscow for its capture of Roslavl. Four rifle divisions were awarded the honorific "Roslavl". Grishin was awarded the Order of Suvorov 1st class and promoted to Lieutenant general. During the offensive, 49th Army had captured Grishin's home village of Vnukovichi, where he learned that German troops had shot his father, mother and other relatives.

In April 1944, the 49th Army became part of the 2nd Belorussian Front. The army fought in Operation Bagration and broke through the German lines. During the offensive, the army crossed the Pronya, Dnieper, Drut and Berezina Rivers. It also captured Mogilev. During the advance towards Minsk, the army helped surround a large group of German troops. From 9 July, all fighting to eliminate this pocket was personally supervised by Grishin. More than 35,000 German troops, including 12 generals, were reportedly captured by 49th Army. For his leadership in the offensive, Grishin was awarded the Order of Kutuzov 1st class. In late July, the army transferred to positions southwest of Navahrudak. During the Bialystok Offensive, the army broke through strong German resistance on the Svislach River. On 24 July, it captured Sokółka and by 27 July was north and west of the city. By 15 September, it was on the Narew near Łomża, where it ceased the advance.

From 13 January 1945, the army fought in the East Prussian Offensive. From 10 February, it took part in the East Pomeranian Offensive. On 21 February, it captured Czersk and on 8 March Kościerzyna. Grishin received a promotion to Colonel general on 10 March. The army captured German fortified city of Danzig on 30 March along with the 2nd Shock, 65th and 70th Armies. During the offensive, 49th Army reportedly killed 11,420 German soldiers and captured 2,495. On 10 April, Grishin was awarded the title Hero of the Soviet Union and the Order of Lenin for his leadership. It then fought in the Berlin Offensive from 16 April, part of the front's main strike force. The army ended the war on the Elbe near Ludwigslust, where they linked up with the British Second Army. On 29 May, he was awarded the Order of Suvorov 1st class a second time. Grishin participated in the Moscow Victory Parade with 2nd Belorussian Front's contingent. At the reception after the parade, Stalin named Grishin an outstanding leader along with other generals such as Zhukov, Konev, Beloborodov, Batov, Bagramyan, Gorbatov and others.

== Postwar ==
In July 1945, Grishin became commander of the 6th Guards Army, stationed in the Baltic. He became head of the combat training directorate in July 1946. Grishin was also a deputy at the Second Convocation of the Supreme Soviet of the Soviet Union. In February 1950, he became head of the Main Combat and Physical Training Directorate. Grishin lived in Moscow and died there on 20 June 1951. He was buried in Novodevichy Cemetery.
