= Friedrich Herrlein =

Nazi general (1889–1974)

- Born: 27 April 1889; Ehrenbreitstein, near Koblenz, German Empire
- Died: 28 July 1974 (aged 84); Giessen, West Germany
- Military career
- Allegiance: German Empire; Weimar Republic; Nazi Germany
- Branch: Army
- Service years: 1910–1945
- Rank: General der Infanterie
- Commands: 71st Infantry Division; 18th Infantry Division; LV Army Corps
- Conflicts: World War I World War II
- Awards: Knight's Cross of the Iron Cross

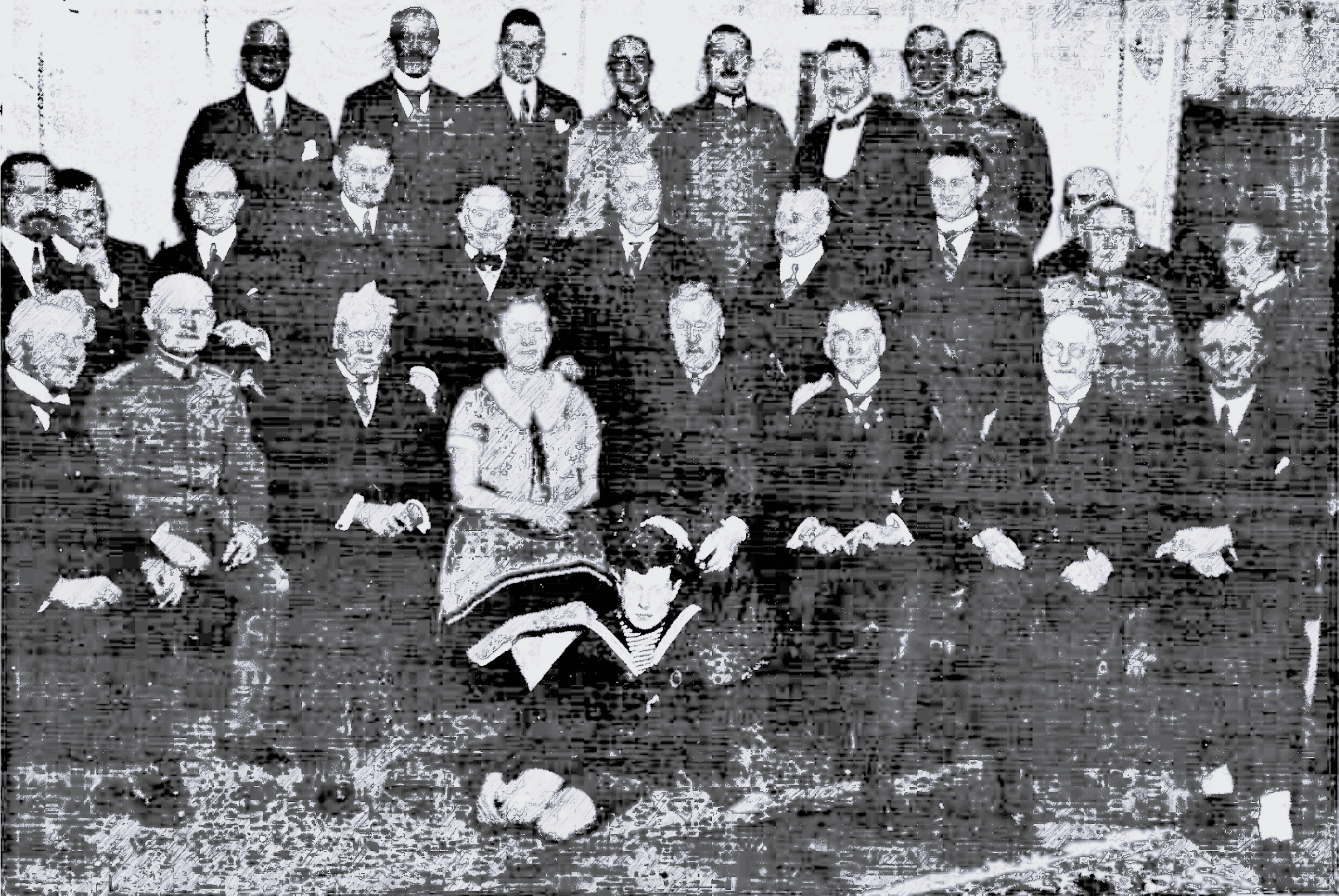
Eckner's reception in Lübeck in 1925. Herrlein is in the top row, far right

Friedrich Herrlein (27 April 1889 – 28 July 1974) was a German general (General der Infanterie) in the Wehrmacht during World War II who commanded the LV Corps. He was a recipient of the Knight's Cross of the Iron Cross, awarded by Nazi Germany. Herrlein surrendered to British troops in 1945 and was interned until 1948.

Herrlein was born in Ehrenbreitstein near Koblenz in 1889 and entered the Royal Prussian Army in 1910. He served in World War I, ending the war as an Hauptmann on the staff of the 224th Infantry Division. He remained as a career officer in the peacetime Reichswehr, serving as a battalion and regimental commander from 1934 to 1941. During World War II, Herrlein commanded the 18th Infantry Division (motorized), served on the staff of OKH and commanded the LV Army Corps.

== Awards ==
- Iron Cross (1914) 2nd Class & 1st Class
- Knight's Cross of the House Order of Hohenzollern with swords
- Hanseatic Cross of Hamburg
- Military Merit Cross of Austria-Hungary, 3rd class with war decoration
- Wound Badge in black
- Honour Cross of the World War 1914/1918
- Iron Cross (1939) 2nd Class & 1st Class
- Knight's Cross of the Iron Cross on 22 August 1941 as Generalmajor and commander of 18. Infanterie-Division

Military offices
Preceded by General der Infanterie Karl Weisenberger	Commander of 71. Infanterie-Division; 15 February 1941 – 28 March 1941	Succeeded by General der Infanterie Alexander von Hartmann
Preceded by Generalleutnant Friedrich-Carl Cranz	Commander of 18. Infanterie-Division; 28 March 1941 – 15 December 1941	Succeeded by Generalleutnant Werner von Erdmannsdorff
Preceded by General der Infanterie Erich Jaschke	Commander of LV. Armeekorps; 6 October 1943 – January 1944	Succeeded by General der Infanterie Horst Großmann
Preceded by General der Infanterie Horst Großmann	Commander of LV. Armeekorps; May 1944 – 5 February 1945	Succeeded by Generalleutnant Kurt Chill
