= 2nd Belorussian Front =

Soviet Red Army formation

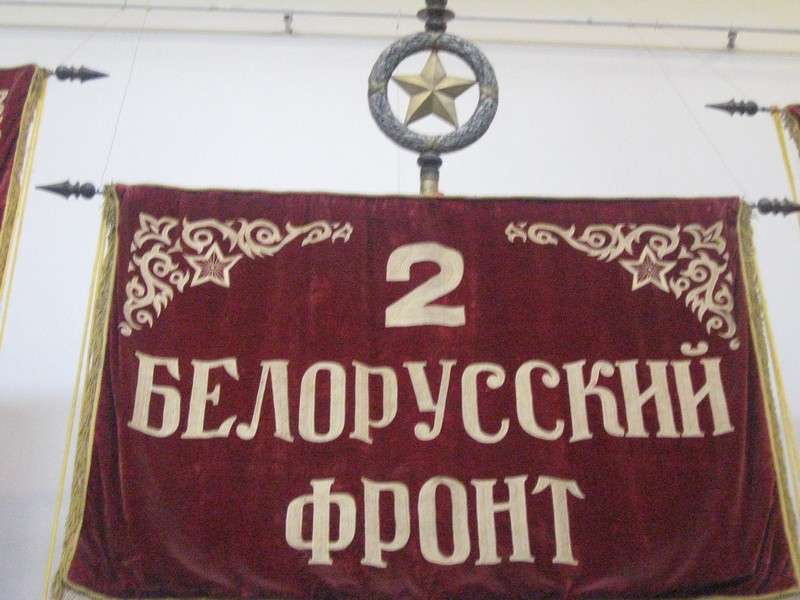
- Standard of the 2nd Belorussian Front
- Active: 24 February 1944 – 5 April 1944; 24 April 1944 – 10 June 1945
- Country: Soviet Union
- Branch: Red Army
- Type: Front
- Engagements: World War II: Eastern Front; Polesskoe offensive; Operation Bagration; Mogilev offensive; Minsk offensive; Belostok offensive; East Prussian Offensive; East Pomeranian offensive; Battle of Berlin

The 2nd Belorussian Front (Russian: Второй Белорусский фронт, Vtoroi Belorusskiy Front, also romanized "Byelorussian"), was a major formation of the Red Army during World War II, being equivalent to a Western army group.

It was created in February 1944 as the Soviets were pushing the Germans back towards Byelorussia. General Colonel Pavel Kurochkin was its first commander. On hiatus in April 1944, its headquarters were reformed from the army headquarters of the disbanding 10th Army. They took part in the capture of Berlin, the capital of Nazi Germany.

== History ==
The 2nd Belorussian Front was formed on the western axis on 24 February 1944 in accordance with a Stavka directive of 17 February, and included the 47th, 61st, 70th Armies, supported by the 6th Air Army and the Dnieper Flotilla. General-polkovnik Pavel Kurochkin was appointed its commander. The field headquarters of the army was formed from that of the Northwestern Front. Subsequently, the 69th Army joined the front. Between 15 March and 4 April the front conducted the Polesskoe offensive, during which it defeated the German troops around Kovel and created conditions for the offensive on the Brest and Lublin axis. After the conclusion of the offensive, the front was disbanded on 5 April, its troops transferred to the 1st Belorussian Front, and the field headquarters withdrawn to the Reserve of the Supreme High Command.

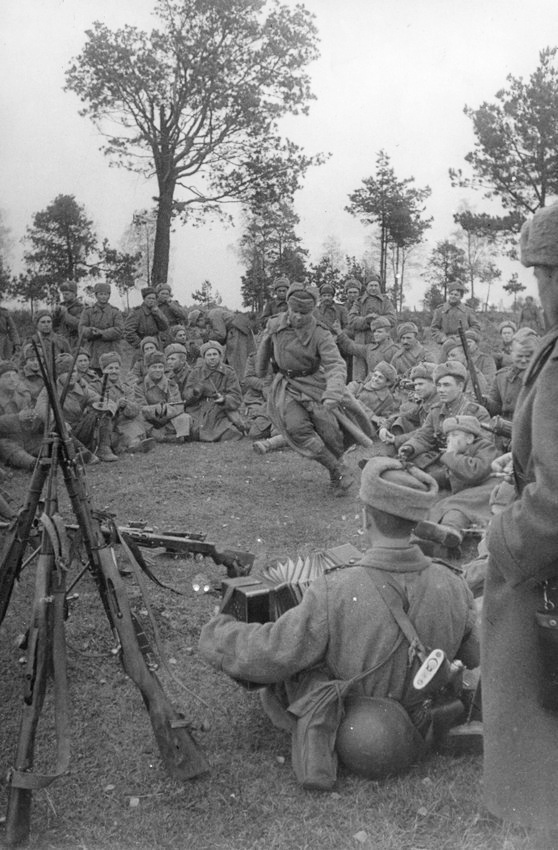
Soldiers of the front on a halt, 1944

The front was reformed on 24 April in accordance with a Stavka directive of 19 April, including the 33rd, 49th, and 50th Armies from the Western Front, under the command of General-polkovnik Ivan Petrov. The field headquarters of the army was formed from that of the 10th Army. In May the front's troops took part in localized fighting in Belorussia. Petrov was replaced in command by General-polkovnik Georgy Zakharov in June. The front conducted the Mogilev offensive during the first phase of Operation Bagration between 23 and 28 June, with its troops forcing the Dnieper in all sectors and liberating Mogilev on 26 June. Continuing the advance, the front took part in the Minsk offensive between 29 June and 4 July, mopping up remains of Army Group Centre's Fourth Army under the command of General von Tippelskirch and the remains of the Ninth Army in a large pocket southeast of Minsk. The front continued driving west in the Belostok offensive from 5 July, which culminated in the liberation of Białystok on 27 July. Between August and November the front's forces liberated western Belorussia, reached the Polish and East Prussian borders, and captured the Rozan bridgehead on the west bank of the Narew, north of Warsaw.

On September 13, 2BF captured Łomża, west of Białystok. In November 1944, Marshal Konstantin Rokossovsky was appointed commander of 2BF, just in time for its last two great offensives of World War II. As part of a massive attack by four Fronts on January 14, 1945, 2BF attacked East Prussia (East Prussian Offensive) and later Pomerania (East Pomeranian Offensive).

- On January 10, 2BF attacked Neustettin but was halted by German counterattacks.
- 14 January: 2BF attacks East Prussia (East Prussian Offensive), heading through the lower half of the Warsaw-Gdańsk railway.
- 24 January: The 1st and 2nd Belorussian Fronts attack in Pomerania (East Pomeranian Offensive). German Second Army cut off.
- 27 February: Elements of the 2BF enter Pomerania
- On February 28, 2BF captured Neustettin.
- 5 March The fortress city of Graudenz on the Vistula surrenders to troops of the 2BF.
- 10 March: 2BF captures Zoppot
- 13 March: 2BF launches an offensive against the Braunsberg pocket south of Königsberg.
- On March 18, the Polish Army of the 2BF captured the fortress city of Kolberg.
- On March 23, 2BF attacked the German II Army in the Danzig area.
- 30 March: Soviet troops capture Danzig,
- 20 April: 2BF offensive across the lower Oder towards Neubrandenburg, Stralsund, and Rostock.
- 25 April 2BF seized a large bridgehead on the Oder River south of Stettin, forcing the centre of the III Panzer Army back to Prenzlau.
- 26 April: 2BF takes Stettin.
- 27 April 2BF captures Prenzlau and Angermünde, 70 km (44 mi) northwest of Berlin.
- On May 5, elements of the 2BF entered Peenemünde.

On April 9, 1945, Königsberg, in East Prussia, fell to the Red Army. This freed up 2BF to move west to the east bank of the Oder River. During the first two weeks of April, the Soviets performed their fastest Front redeployment of the war. General Georgy Zhukov concentrated his 1st Belorussian Front (1BF), which had been deployed along the Oder river from Frankfurt in the south to the Baltic, into an area in front of the Seelow Heights. The 2BF moved into the positions being vacated by the 1BF north of the Seelow Heights. While this redeployment was in progress, gaps were left in the lines, and the remnants of the German II Army, which had been bottled up in a pocket near Danzig, managed to escape across the Oder.

In the early hours on April 16, the final offensive of the war to capture Berlin and link up with Western Allied forces on the Elbe started with attacks by 1BF and, To the south, General Konev's 1st Ukrainian Front (1UF). On April 20, the 2BF joined in the attack. By April 25, 2BF broke out of its bridge head south of Stettin and had by the end of the war captured all of Germany north of Berlin, as far west as the front lines of the British 21 Army Group, which had advanced over the river Elbe in some places.

== Post-war ==
The Headquarters of the 2nd Byelorussian Front became the Headquarters of the Northern Group of Forces (NGF), the Soviet occupation force in Poland, effective June 10, 1945. Most of the NGF's forces were drawn from the 2nd Belorussian Front, along with some elements of the 1st Byelorussian and 1st Ukrainian Fronts.

== Component armies ==
The Armies that were part of the 2nd Belorussian Front included:

- 2nd Shock Army
- 19th Army
- 49th Army
- 50th Army
- 65th Army
- 70th Army
- 5th Guards Tank Army
- 4th Air Army
