= VI Army Corps (Wehrmacht) =

- VI. Armeekorps
- Active: October 1934 – March 1945
- Country: Nazi Germany
- Branch: Army
- Size: Corps
- Engagements: 06/40 Invasion of France; 06/41 Byalistok, Smolensk; 09/41 Vyazma; 11/41 - 01/43 Rzhev salient 08/43 - 10/43 Defence of Smolensk, Vitebsk; 11/43 - 05/44 Vitebsk; 06/44 Defense against Operation Bagration; 07/44 - 08/44 Lida, Byalistok; 09/44 - 01/45 Defence of East Prussia; 01/45 - 03/45 Heiligenbeil pocket

Commanders
- Notable commanders: General Hans Jordan

The VI Corps (German: VI. Armeekorps (VI.AK)) was an infantry corps of the German Army. It fought in several notable actions during World War II.

The corps was originally formed around the 6th Division of the Reichswehr in October 1934 in Münster.

== Wartime service ==
=== 1940 ===
Organisation (June 1940): 15th and 205th Infantry Divisions

Under the command of Otto-Wilhelm Förster, the Corps took part in the German Invasion of France, when it was part of the Twelfth Army of Army Group A. For the remainder of the year it was stationed on the coast as part of the occupation forces.

=== 1941, 1942 ===
Organisation (January 1942): 6th, 26th, 110th, 161st and 256th Infantry Divisions; 1st Panzer Division; heavy artillery, Nebelwerfer, anti-tank and pioneer detachments

In Operation Barbarossa, the VI Corps became part of Army Group Centre, to which it remained attached until the very final period of the war. As part of the Ninth Army, it took part in the costly series of battles in the Rzhev salient throughout 1942.

==== War crimes ====
During the fighting in the Rzhev salient, the civilian population of the area suffered greatly from starvation, partly due to the requisition of stocks by the Wehrmacht, and disease. Many civilians were also deported as forced labour; between May and July 1942 alone VI Corps itself deported over 4,000 civilians in this manner.

The town of Rzhev lost 93% of its population in just thirteen months.

=== 1943 ===
Organisation (November 1943)

- 14th, 206th, 246th, and 256th Infantry Divisions;
- part of 211th Division;
- Vitebsk garrison;
- anti-tank detachments

In 1943 the VI Corps, along with the remainder of Army Group Centre, was pushed back from the Rzhev salient. In the winter of 1943–44, now assigned to Third Panzer Army, it took part in the defensive battles around Vitebsk.

=== 1944 ===
Organisation (June 1944):

- 14th, 95th, 197th, 256th and 299th Infantry Divisions;
- Sturmgeschütz Brigade 281

On 22 June 1944, after a period of little activity along the front of Army Group Centre, the VI Corps was involved in the defence against the major Soviet summer offensive, Operation Bagration. Despite being one of the strongest corps in its Army Group, with four infantry divisions and the 14th Infantry Division in reserve, it was overwhelmed by the attack of the 5th Guards and 39th Armies, and largely destroyed in the lines around Bahushewsk by 25 June. The few elements that retreated to the Berezina River were mostly trapped and annihilated in the subsequent encirclement east of Minsk, while the corps commander, General Georg Pfeiffer, was killed on 28 June. The commanders of the 256th and 197th Divisions, Wustenhagen and Hahne, were also killed, while Michaelis of the 95th Division was captured. Most of their 40–50,000 troops met a similar fate.

In mid-July the scratch formation Sperrgruppe Weidling, which included remnants of some of the original units of VI Corps, was renamed as VI Corps. The Corps took part in the improvised defence against the Russian strategic operations for the remainder of the summer.

=== 1945 ===
Organisation (March 1945):

- 131st and 61st Infantry Divisions (at Kampfgruppe strength);
- 10th Radfahrjäger Brigade;
- 18th Panzergrenadier Division

The rebuilt VI Corps was allocated to Fourth Army where it faced the East Prussian Offensive from January 1945. It was encircled in the Heiligenbeil Pocket on the Baltic coast, and destroyed there in March.

== Commanders ==
- General der Artillerie Günther von Kluge (1 April 1935 – 24 November 1938)
- General der Pioniere Otto-Wilhelm Förster (24 November 1938 – 31 December 1941)
- General der Infanterie Bruno Bieler (1 January 1942 – 31 October 1942)
- General der Infanterie Hans Jordan (1 November 1942 – 20 May 1944)
- General der Infanterie Georg Pfeiffer (20 May 1944 – 28 June 1944) - KIA
- General der Artillerie Helmuth Weidling (28 June 1944 – 11 August 1944)
- General der Infanterie Horst Großmann (11 August 1944 – January 1945)
- Generalleutnant Ralph Graf von Oriola (January 1945)
- General der Infanterie Horst Großmann (January 1945 – 8 May 1945)
