= Andrey Lyakhov =

Andrey Nikitovich Lyakhov
- Lyakhov, c. 1940
- Born: 25 August 1909; Konstantinovka, Stavropol Governorate, Russian Empire
- Died: 19 September 1943 (aged 34)
- Allegiance: Soviet Union
- Branch: Red Army
- Service years: 1931–1943
- Rank: Colonel
- Commands: 95th Guards Rifle Division
- Conflicts: World War II
- Awards: Order of the Red Banner

Andrey Nikitovich Lyakhov (Russian: Андрей Никитович Ляхов; 25 August 1909 – 19 September 1943) was a Red Army colonel killed in World War II who commanded the 95th Guards Rifle Division.

== Early life and prewar service ==
Andrey Nikitovich Lyakhov was born on 25 August 1909 in the village of Konstantinovka, Konstantinovskoy volost, Petrovsky uyezd, Stavropol Governorate. Before his military service, he began studies at the Stavropol Agricultural Tekhnikum in 1928, while working as a livestock specialist at the sovkhoz Plemrassadnik, a sheep farm part of the tekhnikum. Conscripted into the Red Army on 13 November 1931 by the Voroshilovsky RVK in Voroshilov, Lyakhov was sent as a cadet to the one-year conscript detachment of the 65th Rifle Regiment of the 22nd Rifle Division at Novorossiysk. After graduating in October 1932, he was appointed to the 25th (later the 112th) Rifle Regiment of the 38th Rifle Division at Novocherkassk, serving as a machine gun platoon commander, platoon commander in the regimental school, and assistant commander and commander of the 2nd Machine Gun Company.

In May 1937, Lyakhov was transferred to serve as a tactics instructor at the Armavir Reserve Officers Improvement Course (KUKS). From October of that year he served in the same position at the Junior Lieutenants Course in Krasnodar and from April 1938 at the Millerovo Reserve KUKS. On 10 February 1940 he was appointed assistant chief for the training and personnel sections of the Nizhny Chir Reserve KUKS, then served as chief of the training department of the course. In November of that year, Lyakhov transferred to serve as chief of staff of the 751st Rifle Regiment of the 165th Rifle Division of the North Caucasus Military District, forming at Ordzhonikidze. By 1941, he completed two courses of the correspondence department of the Frunze Military Academy.

== World War II ==
After Operation Barbarossa began, the 165th was sent to the Southwestern Front with the 64th Rifle Corps, where it joined the 26th Army. Unloading at Brovary on 12 July 1941, the 165th was tasked by the front headquarters with ensuring the defense of the Dnieper crossings, then as part of the corps attacked towards Fastov in the second echelon. During these actions, Lyakhov was concussed on 15 July but did not leave the frontline. He was wounded on 27 July near Klekhovka, Fastov District and evacuated to a hospital.

After recovering, Lyakhov was sent back to the Southwestern Front and on 4 October appointed chief of staff of the 987th Rifle Regiment of the 226th Rifle Division. With the division as part of the 21st Army he fought in defensive battles on the eastern bank of the Seversky Donets. For his actions in the battle for Yastrebovo on 29 December, in which he was wounded, then-Major Lyakhov was awarded the Order of the Red Star on 10 April 1942. Wounded a second time on 13 February 1942 near Sazhnoye, he was appointed commander of the regiment in April, leading it in the Second Battle of Kharkov during May and June. On 22 June the division marched to the Korocha region, rejoining the 21st Army, part of the Southwestern Front and then the Stalingrad Front from 12 July, fighting in the Battle of Voronezh and the defensive of the approaches to Stalingrad. During the Battle of Voronezh, Lyakhov was wounded a third time on 13 June near Novo-aleksandrovskoy, Kharkov Oblast.

The 226th was withdrawn to the Reserve of the Supreme High Command (RVGK) for rebuilding at Buguruslan on 6 August. Joining the Don Front on 18 October, the division fought as part of the 66th Army in offensive operations to destroy the German forces around Stalingrad. In January and early February 1943, in Operation Koltso, the division, overcoming stubborn Axis resistance, assault-crossed the Mokraya Mechetka and on 2 February captured the ruins of the Stalingrad Tractor Factory. For this action the division was converted into the 95th Guards Rifle Division on 4 May. Then-Lieutenant Colonel Lyakhov was awarded the Order of the Red Banner on 21 January and the Order of Alexander Nevsky on 11 March. After the end of the Battle of Stalingrad the division was withdrawn to the RVGK in the Steppe Military District, where it joined the 5th Guards Army.

In June 1943 Lyakhov, promoted to colonel, was appointed deputy commander of the 95th Guards Rifle Division, and from 30 June temporarily commanded it while Major General Nikolai Nikitchenko was being treated for illness. On 10 July the division and its army were sent to the Voronezh Front in the area west of Prokhorovka on the Psel and fought in the Battle of Kursk. When Nikitchenko returned from 26 July Lyakhov resumed his duties as deputy division commander. In August he fought with the division in the Belgorod-Kharkov offensive. From 12 to 26 August the division fought in fierce fighting in the Bogodukhov region, then attacked along the Kharkov-Poltava railway. From 7 September the division with the army fought in heavy battles on the Poltava sector as part of the Steppe Front, in which Lyakhov was killed on 19 September. After the liberation of Poltava, he was buried in the square of the Kiev station.

== Awards ==
Lyakhov was a recipient of the following decorations:

- Order of the Red Banner
- Order of Alexander Nevsky
- Order of the Patriotic War, 1st class
- Order of the Red Star
- Medal "For the Defence of Stalingrad"
- Foreign orders
