= 343rd Rifle Division =

- Active: 1941–1945
- Country: Soviet Union
- Branch: Red Army
- Type: Infantry
- Size: Division
- Engagements: Battle of Rostov (1941); Barvenkovo-Lozovaia Operation; Second Battle of Kharkov; Operation Blue; Battle of Stalingrad; Operation Koltso; Operation Bagration; Minsk Offensive; Belostok Offensive; Lublin–Brest Offensive; Vistula-Oder Offensive; East Prussian Offensive; Battle of Königsberg
- Decorations: Order of the Red Banner 2nd Formation; Order of Suvorov 2nd Formation; Order of Kutuzov 2nd Formation
- Battle honours: Belostok

Commanders
- Notable commanders: Col. Pyotr Pavlovich Chuvashev; Maj. Gen. Matvei Alekseevich Usenko; Maj. Gen. Anton Ivanovich Yakimovich; Maj. Gen. Aleksandr Lvovich Kronik

The 343rd Rifle Division was first formed in late August, 1941, as a standard Red Army rifle division, at Stavropol, in the Caucasus region. Its first major operation was in the liberation of Rostov in December, 1941. Following this, it was nearly caught up in the debacle near Kharkov in May, 1942, but managed to evade the German spearheads during Operation Blue to join the forces defending the Stalingrad region during the summer and fall. Following the German surrender at Stalingrad, on May 4, 1943, it was re-designated as the 97th Guards Rifle Division. Over a year later, a new 343rd Rifle Division was formed, based on the personnel and equipment of a Fortified Region, just after the start of Operation Bagration, the destruction of German Army Group Center. This new division went on to distinguish itself by helping to liberate the Polish city of Białystok, and ended the war in East Prussia, near Königsberg.

== 1st Formation ==
The division was formed in August and September, 1941 in the North Caucasus Military District. Its order of battle was as follows:

- 1151st Rifle Regiment
- 1153rd Rifle Regiment
- 1155th Rifle Regiment
- 903rd Artillery Regiment
- 620th Sapper Battalion
- 791st Signal Battalion
- 402nd Reconnaissance Company

The division had a political cadre of 413 Communist Party members and 315 Komsomols (Young Communists). The division's first commander, Col. Pyotr Pavlovich Chuvashev, was assigned on August 23, and he would remain in command until nearly the end of 1942.

The 343rd remained forming up and training in the North Caucasus until October 16, when it was assigned to the 56th Army, which was itself forming up near Rostov in Southern Front. In December the division received the 567th Antitank Battalion as a much-needed reinforcement. It remained in this Army and Front until the end of the year, during which time it participated in the liberation of Rostov, which had been occupied by the German Army Group South on November 21. The division led the assault into the city against the withdrawing German forces, and thereafter drove them back to the Mius River. It was briefly moved to 9th Army, then, in January, 1942, the 343rd was reassigned to the 6th Army in Southwestern Front, where it was held in reserve. During the Barvenkovo-Lozovaia Operation, which created the so-called Izium Salient, the division was committed late in the battle, when it seized the village of Nizhne Bishkin, the furthest point of 6th Army's advance into the bridgehead.

=== Second Battle of Kharkov ===
As the Red Army prepared a new offensive to liberate the city of Kharkov in May, in part from the Izium Salient, the 343rd was in the reserves of the Southwestern Direction, along with the 277th Rifle Division, 2nd Cavalry Corps, and three separate tank battalions. The division had been given orders to:

"...prepare a defence along the line of Nurovo, Hill 191.0 and Kune, and be constantly ready to repel possible enemy attacks along the Bogodarovka, Nurov; Balakleia, Aleksandrovka; and Izium, Kune axes."

These positions would leave the division east of the base of the salient, sparing it the fate of much of the rest of the two attacking Fronts.

The offensive began on May 12. While it made some impressive gains in the early days, the Soviet forces were, at the same time, leaving themselves more and more vulnerable to counterattack as they pressed westward. By May 16, German mobile forces, especially their III Motorized Corps, were building up on the south side of the salient. On the following day, the southern half of the Soviet operation went over to the defensive. In spite of this, the German counteroffensive broke through most of the positions of 9th Army, and the eastern flank of 57th Army. The commander of the Southwestern Direction, Marshal Semyon Timoshenko, ordered the 343rd, along with the 92nd Separate Tank Battalion and an antitank battalion, to concentrate south in the Izium region, cross to the right bank of the Northern Donets River and take up defensive positions on the southern approaches to Izium to backstop 9th Army.

On the morning of May 18, while an estimated 150 German tanks were advancing on Izium, the division began its march to the south. By 1230 hrs., German forces captured the southern part of the town, in part because the 343rd had not yet reached there, but overnight it forced the enemy out, and, in cooperation with 5th Cavalry Corps, protected the crossings of the Northern Donets and built a defense on the southern approaches. However, during the 19th it was not ready to force the river crossings so had not completed its mission. On the following night the crossings were accomplished. However, none of this prevented the attacking Germans from sidestepping to the west and completing the encirclement of the forces inside the bridgehead on May 22. During the encirclement battle over the next week there was little the 343rd could contribute apart from providing fire support to the small groups attempting to escape through the German lines.

=== Operation Blue and the Stalingrad Campaign ===
While the Kharkov battle had left the 343rd relatively unscathed, it was about to face its sternest test, as the German summer offensive began on its sector on June 28. On this date it was serving in 21st Army, still in Southwestern Front. This Army was holding a line along the Oskol River, roughly from west of Stary Oskol to west of Novy Oskol, facing the bulk of German Sixth Army. The division was once again in a reserve role, backing up the 76th and 293rd Rifle Divisions on the Army's south flank.

When the German storm broke, during the month of July, the 343rd and its Army could do little except stage a costly fighting withdrawal across the steppes. By August 1 it had been incorporated into the new Stalingrad Front, fighting west of the Don River. By August 12 the defense had been withdrawn east of the Don, and 21st Army was assigned a 140-kilometre-wide sector from the mouth of the Khoper River to Melo-Kletskii. 4th Tank Army was still holding a bridgehead south of the Don, which was reinforced overnight on the 12th-13th by the 343rd near Melo-Kletskii. The division was reported at this time to have a personnel strength of 8,677 men. On the following day, Sixth Army launched a diversionary assault with its XI Army Corps, which forced the 343rd and the 321st Rifle Division to withdraw back across the Don. While the situation of the bridgehead deteriorated, Stalingrad Front ordered a counterstroke to begin at dawn on August 17, using the 343rd, 321st, and two other rifle divisions, plus arriving elements of the fresh 1st Guards Army. This counterstroke was unsuccessful; by the end of the day the bridgehead had been encircled, and the 343rd's strength had eroded to just 230 "bayonets" (front-line infantry) and six guns. Only the timely arrival of two divisions of 1st Guards Army allowed those remnants to escape. The bridgehead battle had been extremely costly for the division.

On August 23, the XXXX Panzer Corps of Sixth Army crossed the Don and staged its one-day dash across the steppe to the Volga, just north of Stalingrad. This move left 21st Army facing the north side of the corridor. Over the coming months Soviet forces on both sides would make several attempts to sever the corridor; collectively these are known as the Kotluban Offensives after a village north of the corridor. On September 28 the STAVKA ordered the formation of the new Don Front, to which 21st Army was assigned. During the same month the remnants of the 343rd were reassigned to 24th Army of that Front, where they fought to capture the Mty region on October 10 during the third offensive. Later that month the division was transferred again, now to the new 66th Army, where it would remain until both it and its Army were raised to Guards status early the next year.

Beginning on October 20, a fourth Kotluban offensive was launched. While it was increasingly apparent these offensives would not break the German lines, they were diverting enemy strength from the fighting in Stalingrad itself. The shock group of 66th Army consisted of four relatively fresh divisions, with three tank brigades in support. The Army's remaining nine divisions, including the 343rd, were to make supporting attacks on the flanks, although they were all severely under strength, with roughly a battalion of attacking infantry each. The division was paired with 49th Rifle Division on the right flank, with minimal armor support, to attack south towards Kuzmichi. In the event, the attack failed. In a report filed on October 21, the "343rd RD, encountering strong enemy fire, fought in the region 4 kilometres northeast of Kuzmichi." On the two following days it was reported fighting in its previous positions. The Soviet forces dug in on any gains they had made on October 27.

=== Operation Uranus and Operation Ring ===
As Operation Uranus began the division remained in its former positions, now in the second echelon of 66th Army. The Army did not have an active role in the offensive, but was expected to tie down enemy forces through local attacks and raids to prevent them shifting westward to where the penetration was to take place.

On December 23, Maj. Gen. Matvei Alekseevich Usenko took command of the division. Usenko had had a very trying time at the front to this point. He had been convicted for "unskillful command of forces" while leading the 2nd Cavalry Corps in December, 1941; he was sentenced to 10 years to be served after the war, and was reduced in rank to Colonel. In June, 1942, he was assigned to command of the 226th Rifle Division, which performed very well and later became the 95th Guards Rifle Division. When Usenko took command of the 343rd, many of the recent recruits had been taken from the GULAG or from the criminal justice system, including some of the officers and NCOs. Based on his experiences, Usenko knew how to make these men into an effective fighting formation.

Following the encirclement of Sixth Army and the defeat of the German relief operation, 66th Army began its share of operations to reduce the pocket. Between December 26 and 31 attacks by the 16th, 266th and 343rd Rifle Divisions struck the hilltop positions of 16th and 24th Panzer Divisions north and northwest of the town of Orlovka. Over the course of that week the already heavily depleted German units lost 712 men.

When the final stage of Operation Ring began on January 26, 1943, German XI Army Corps fell back towards the factory district of Stalingrad. The 343rd helped to finally liberate Orlovka, and advanced as far as the west bank of the Mechetka River. On the 28th the division crossed the river with the 99th Rifle Division and advanced about 100 metres into the Tractor Factory village. On February 1, 66th Army attacked at 1000 hrs. into the last enemy-held positions in the village. By this time the 343rd had no more than 1,000 front-line infantry remaining. The following day the remaining Germans in the northern pocket laid down their arms. During the course of Operation Ring the division was officially credited with capturing 6,647 enemy officers and men, and seizing 67 artillery pieces, 297 machine guns, 30 tanks, 521 other vehicles, and 5,253 rifles.

When the fighting at Stalingrad concluded, the 343rd was first assigned to the Stalingrad Group of Forces on February 6. On March 13 it went into the Reserve of the Supreme High Command with the rest of 66th Army. In April, 1943, the Army was re-designated as 5th Guards Army, and on May 4 the division became the 97th Guards Rifle Division. General Usenko continued in command of the 97th Guards until May 12, when he died near Voronezh after being blown up by a mine while his vehicle was crossing a road.

== 2nd Formation ==
After about a year, a new 343rd Rifle Division was formed in 2nd Belorussian Front on June 27, 1944, based on the 154th Fortified Region. Its first commander was Maj. Gen. Anton_Ivanovich Yakimovich, who was appointed on the same day. When formed, the division took on the designations of regular rifle regiments that had been promoted to Guards status earlier in the war, so its basic order of battle was as follows:

- 356th Rifle Regiment
- 370th Rifle Regiment
- 378th Rifle Regiment
- 1020th Artillery Regiment

This was just into the pursuit phase of Operation Bagration, and the division was in combat almost immediately. On July 9 it was released to 49th Army from Front reserve. It was tasked, along with 38th Rifle Corps and five other separate rifle divisions, plus three NKVD border regiments, to methodically comb through the forested areas east of Minsk with light air support. This was a search and destroy mission against enemy groups that had not yet surrendered. This operation ended on July 13, and the division remained in 49th Army.

On July 27, exactly one month after forming, the division was given credit for its role in the liberation of the Polish city of Białystok (Russian: Belostok) and received its name as an honorific:

"BELOSTOK - ...343rd Rifle Division (Major General Yakimovich, Anton Ivanovich)... By order of the Supreme High Command of 27 July 1944 and a commendation in Moscow, the troops who participated in the battles for the liberation of Belostok are given a salute of 20 artillery salvoes from 224 guns."

General Yakimovich lived less than a month longer. On August 25 at 2030 hrs., during fighting along the Narew River in northern Poland, the vehicle in which we was traveling was blown up by an enemy antitank mine 800 metres south of the villages of Pensy and Lipno. His adjutant, Capt. Golovin, and his driver, Litvinenko, were also killed in the explosion. Yakimovich was succeeded two days later by Maj. Gen. Aleksandr Lvovich Kronik, who would hold this command for the duration of the war.

In August, the division, less than two months old, had to be built up with 1,000 replacements from the 205th Reserve Rifle Regiment. In December it was transferred to the 81st Rifle Corps in 50th Army, still in 2nd Belorussian Front; it would remain in that Corps and Army for the duration. At the start of the Vistula-Oder Offensive in January, 1945, 50th Army was deployed on the right flank of its Front, and had a defensive role at the outset. It was not ordered to advance until January 17. By February 8, elements of the Army had captured Heilsberg. The next day 50th Army, now with just six rifle divisions, including the 343rd, was ordered to be transferred to 3rd Belorussian Front, where it would remain for the duration.

By February 21, 50th Army's forces had begun fighting to the east of Peterswalde. On March 8, 81st Rifle Corps was ordered to concentrate in the Botenen area, in preparation for the eventual assault on Königsberg. On April 5, the day before the final battle for the city began, the division was awarded the Order of the Red Banner for the capture of Biała Piska and other nearby towns, and its general record of service. On the same day, it was also awarded the Order of Kutuzov, 2nd degree, for its role in the capture of Wormditt, Melzak, and the surrounding area. At this time, 81st Corps was due north of the city, near the right flank of its Army, and was reinforced for the attack, which began the next day. During the next 24 hours it advanced as much as 2 km, with a further advance of about the same distance on April 7, against stubborn resistance. By the end of the day on April 9 the fortress surrendered.

== Postwar ==
Following the siege, the 343rd joined the Zemland Group of Forces, clearing the remaining German elements from the Baltic coast. At the time of the German surrender, the men and women of the division carried the following title: 343rd Rifle, Belostok, Order of the Red Banner, Order of Suvorov Division. (Russian: 343-я стрелковая Белостокская Краснознамённая ордена Суворова дивизия.) The 343rd and its corps were withdrawn to the Kiev Military District, where they disbanded on December 30, 1945.
