= Matvei Usenko =

Officer in the Red Army

Matvei Alekseevich Usenko
- Born: 9 August 1898
- Died: 12 May 1943 (aged 44); Bobrov, Voronezh Oblast, Soviet Union
- Military career
- Allegiance: Soviet Union
- Branch: Red Army
- Service years: 1918–1943
- Rank: Major General
- Commands: 31st Cavalry Division; 1st Airborne Corps; 2nd Cavalry Corps; 226th Rifle Division; 343rd Rifle Division; 97th Guards Rifle Division
- Conflicts: Russian Civil War; World War II; Southern Front; Eastern Front †
- Awards: Order of the Red Banner (2)

Matvei Alekseevich Usenko (Russian: Матвей Алексеевич Усенко; August 9 [O.S. July 28] 1898, – May 12 1943) was a major general of the Red Army during the Second World War.

== Biography ==
In 1918 he joined the Red Army, and during the Civil War served with enough distinction to be awarded both the Order of the Red Banner and the Order of the Red Star. During the interwar years he commanded the 63rd Cavalry Regiment for more than two years in 1933-35, then was transferred to serve two years as the assistant commanding officer of the prestigious Special Cavalry Division named for I.V. Stalin. He went on to the position of acting commander of that division for the following year. In 1938 he spent three months as Inspector of Cavalry for the Far Eastern Separate Red Banner Army, during which time he was promoted to the rank of Kombrig. He went on to take command of the 31st Cavalry Division for over a year. From December, 1939, until the outbreak of the Great Patriotic War he attended the Military Academy of the General Staff. On June 4, 1940, he was promoted to the rank of major general.

At the outbreak of war, Usenko was given command of the 1st Airborne Corps (a division-sized unit) in Southwestern Front. He bravely and skilfully led this unit through July and August, participating in the defense of Kiev. He escaped from the Kiev encirclement with a portion of his troops, and, after a brief assignment as deputy commanding officer of 26th Army in December he was assigned to command of the 2nd Cavalry Corps in Southern Front.

On April 9, 1942, Southern Front headquarters sent a telegram to the Soviet High Command stating that, in accordance with the Ukrainian SSR criminal code, Usenko had been sentenced to 'deprivation of his freedom' for 10 years for commission of a military crime. However, given the shortage of experienced senior officers, Usenko's sentence was delayed until after the war. After examining the legal process, the USSR People's Commissariat for Defence annulled the sentence, but reduced Usenko to the rank of colonel. It further recommended that Southwestern Front, at its own discretion, appoint Usenko to command of a rifle division.

On May 16 Usenko was reduced in rank, and on June 22 he was appointed to command of the 226th Rifle Division. During the following two months he led the division through the trials of the German summer offensive, once again with considerable skill. The remnants of the 226th (later the 95th Guards Rifle Division) went back to be reformed on August 14, and Usenko was sidelined until he was given command of the 343rd Rifle Division on December 23.

Usenko led this division through the later stages of Operation Koltso, the reduction of the encircled German 6th Army at Stalingrad, as part of 66th Army. During the course of the operation the much-depleted division was officially credited with capturing 6,647 enemy officers and men, and seizing 67 artillery pieces, 297 machine guns, 30 tanks, 521 other vehicles, and 5,253 rifles.

Following the German defeat, Usenko regained his rank of major general on May 2, 1943, and on May 4 his division became the 97th Guards Rifle Division. General Usenko continued in command of the 97th Guards for just a few days; on May 12 he died near Voronezh after being blown up by a mine while his vehicle was crossing a road.
