= Andrey Oleynikov =

Soviet Army major general

Andrey Ivanovich Oleynikov
- Oleynikov, c. 1945
- Born: 25 May 1898; Novo-Kuznetsovsky, Don Host Oblast, Russian Empire
- Died: December 1990 (aged 92) Kiev, Soviet Union
- Allegiance: Russian Empire; Russian SFSR; Soviet Union
- Branch: Imperial Russian Army; Red Army
- Service years: 1917, 1918–1954
- Rank: Major general
- Commands: 95th Guards Rifle Division; 9th Rifle Corps
- Conflicts: Battles of Khalkhin Gol; World War II
- Awards: Order of Lenin (2); Order of the Red Banner (3)

Andrey Ivanovich Oleynikov (Russian: Андрей Иванович Олейников; 25 May 1898 – December 1990) was a Soviet Army major general who commanded the 95th Guards Rifle Division during World War II.

== Early life, World War I, and Russian Civil War ==
Andrey Ivanovich Oleynikov was born on 25 May 1898 in the khutor of Novo-Kuznetsovsky, Mechetinskaya stanitsa, Novocherkassky Okrug, Don Host Oblast. During World War I, Oleynikov was conscripted into the Imperial Russian Army in February 1917 and sent as a private to the 187th Reserve Regiment in Rostov-on-Don. After deserting in May, he worked at the ports in Kerch and Novorossiysk.

During the Russian Civil War, Oleynikov returned to his home village in February 1918 and joined the partisan cavalry detachment of Boris Dumenko (later commanded by G.G. Kolpakov). With the detachment, he fought in battles against the Volunteer Army and White Cossacks. After the retreat to Tsaritsyn, the detachment was reorganized in May 1918 on its incorporation into the Red Army and Oleynikov became a Red Army man in the 3rd Don-Stavropol Regiment. With the regiment, he fought in battles against the forces of Pyotr Krasnov south of Martynovsky, Velikoknyazheskoy, Rostov-on-Don, Belaya Glina, and Yegorlykskaya. Oleynikov was concussed during the retreat from the Don Host Oblast in July 1919. In November the regiment was reorganized as the 21st Cavalry Regiment of the 4th Cavalry Division of the 1st Cavalry Army and fought in the Kharkov, Donbass, and Rostov–Novocherkassk operations, and the Battle of Yegorlykskaya. In April 1920 Oleynikov was sent to the commanders’ school of the 1st Cavalry Army, reorganized as the 5th Yelisavetgrad Cavalry Commanders School. As a cadet of the school he fought in battles against the Army of Wrangel, the suppression of the landing of Colonel Nazarov and the elimination of the Revolutionary Insurrectionary Army of Ukraine in Yekaterinoslav Governorate.

== Interwar period ==
Upon graduating from the school in September 1923, Oleynikov was appointed to the 14th Cavalry Regiment of the Special Purpose Brigade of the 1st Cavalry Army, in which he served as a section commander, assistant platoon leader, and platoon leader. In March 1924 the brigade was reorganized as the 1st Special Cavalry Brigade, and Oleynikov appointed platoon commander in the 62nd Cavalry Regiment. In March 1925 he was placed at the disposal of the staff of the Turkestan Front, then served as a platoon commander in the 82nd Cavalry Regiment of the 8th Cavalry Brigade at Merv. After three months, he was transferred to hold the same post with Separate Turkmen National Cavalry Squadron at Ashkhabad. When the squadron disbanded in January 1926, Oleynikov was appointed a platoon commander in the regimental school of the 1st Turkmen Cavalry Regiment. He was sent back to Merv in June of that year as a platoon commander in the 3rd Turkmen Cavalry Regiment. From November 1926 to July 1927, Oleynikov completed the Moscow Military-Political Course, then was sent to the Far East as a politruk in the Machine Gun Squadron of the 85th Cavalry Regiment of the 9th Cavalry Brigade. Transferred to the 78th Cavalry Regiment in August 1928, he served as assistant commander of the squadron for the political section and battery politruk.

Oleynikov began the preparatory course of the Frunze Military Academy in October 1932 and after completing it in April 1933 continued to the special department of the academy. Graduating from the academy with a 1st class diploma on 31 October 1936, he was appointed assistant chief of the 2nd section of the staff of the 7th Cavalry Corps of the Kiev Military District. Rising to chief of the 1st section of the corps staff in October 1937, Oleynikov was sent to continue his military education at the General Staff Academy a month later. Graduating from the academy in August 1939, he was appointed senior assistant to the chief of the operational section of the staff of the front group under the command of Grigory Shtern, participating in the Battles of Khalkhin Gol. The headquarters of the Far Eastern Front was formed from that of the Chita Front Group of Forces in July 1940, and then-Major Oleynikov continued to serve in this position.

== World War II ==
After Operation Barbarossa began, Oleynikov became chief of staff of the 27th Reserve Brigade, which joined the 2nd Red Banner Army of the Far Eastern Front at Svobodny, in late July 1941. In November, he was appointed chief of staff of the 116th Rifle Division of the Transbaikal Front, forming in Chita Oblast at Antipikha and Peschanka. In early February 1942 the division was railed to Kaluga, where it joined the 50th Army of the Western Front and fought in the Rzhev–Vyazma Offensive. From April to July 1942 it was in the army reserve in the area of Mosalsk, then fought in heavy offensive battles for the capture of Shakhovo and Pavlovo. In August 1942 division was relocated to the Stalingrad sector and fought in the Battle of Stalingrad, participating in continuous offensive battles as part of the 1st Guards and then the 24th and 66th Armies of the Stalingrad and Don Fronts. Then-Colonel Oleynikov became deputy division commander on 9 December and was appointed chief of the operations department of the staff of the 66th Army on 28 December. In January 1943 its troops fought in the liquidation of the Stalingrad pocket. After the end of the battle the army joined the group of forces under the command of Lieutenant General Kuzma Trubnikov then was withdrawn to the Reserve of the Supreme High Command (RVGK) in the Steppe Military District. The army was redesignated as the 5th Guards Army on 5 May, and during the month Oleynikov was appointed deputy chief of staff of the army for auxiliary command posts. With the army, he fought on the Voronezh and Steppe (from 20 October the 2nd Ukrainian) Fronts in the Battle of Kursk, the offensive battles at Oboyan and Prokhorovka, the capture of Left-bank Ukraine and the Battle of the Dnieper.

Oleynikov took command of the 95th Guards Rifle Division of the army on 6 November. He led it in the operations in Right-bank Ukraine, and the Kirovograd and Uman–Botoșani offensives. For courage, valor and exemplary fulfillment of combat missions the division was awarded the Order of the Red Banner on 10 December 1943 and for the liberation of Novoukrainka and the vital railroad junction of Pomoshnaya the Order of Bogdan Khmelnitsky, 2nd class, on 29 March 1944. In late July the division and its army were withdrawn to the RVGK and relocated to the Ternopol sector, joining the 1st Ukrainian Front. In period from 21 to 29 July, the division made a 320 km march, crossed the Vistula, and occupied defensive positions on a bridgehead 60 km southwest of Sandomierz. Subsequently, the division fought in the Lvov–Sandomierz, Vistula–Oder, Sandomierz–Silesian, Upper and Lower Silesian, Berlin and Prague Offensives. For exemplary fulfillment of command tasks during the battles to break through German defenses west of Sandomierz, the division was awarded the Order of Lenin on 19 February 1945. It received the Order of Suvorov, 2nd class on 28 May for its courage in battle and breakthrough of German defenses on the Neisse and the capture of Cottbus, Lübben, Zossen, Beemets, Luckenwalde, Treuenbrietzen, Zahna, Marienfelde, Trebbin, Rangsdorf, and Keltow.

== Postwar ==
After the end of the war, Oleynikov continued to command the division in the Central Group of Forces. Placed at the disposal of Personnel Directorate of the Ground Forces in August 1946, he was appointed chief of a course in the special department of the Frunze Military Academy in December, and later that month chief of the Kiev Red Banner Infantry School. Oleynikov was placed at the disposal of the chairman of DOSARM in August 1949, being appointed chairman of the Republic DOSARM Committee of the Ukrainian Soviet Socialist Republic. He became deputy commander of the 9th Rifle Corps of the 3rd Army of the Group of Soviet Occupation Forces in Germany in September 1951 and succeeded to command of the corps in December 1952. Oleynikov retired in May 1954 and lived in Kiev until his death in December 1990.

== Awards ==
Oleynikov was a recipient of the following decorations:

- Order of Lenin (2)
- Order of the Red Banner (3)
- Order of Suvorov, 2nd class
- Order of Kutuzov, 2nd class
- Order of Bogdan Khmelnitsky, 2nd class
- Order of the Patriotic War, 1st class (2)
- Order of the Red Star
- Medals
- Foreign orders and medals
