= 97th Guards Mechanized Brigade =

343rd Rifle Division (1941–43) 97th Guards Rifle Division (1943–57) 97th Guards Motor Rifle Division (1957–1992) 97th Mechanized Brigade (1992–2004)
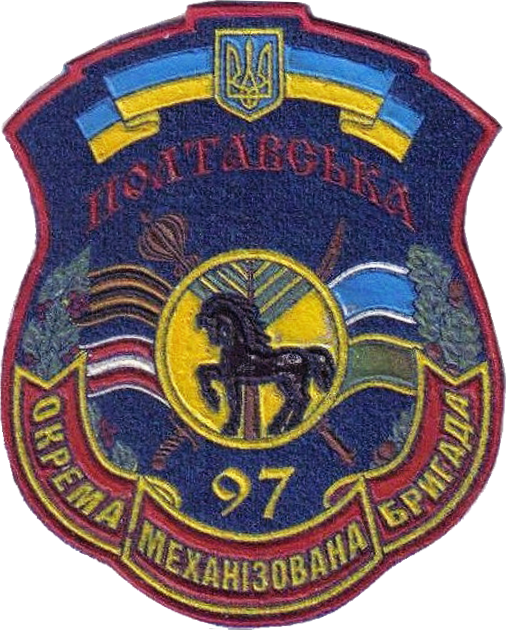
- Brigade Insignia
- Active: August 1941 – November 2004
- Country: Ukraine
- Branch: Ukrainian Army
- Type: Mechanized Brigade
- Part of: 13th Army Corps
- Garrison/HQ: А-1766 Slavuta, Khmelnytskyi Oblast
- Equipment: T-64; BMP-2; ZSU-23-4; 2S3 Akatsiya; 2S1
- Engagements: World War II
- Decorations: Order of the Red Banner; Order of Suvorov; Order of Bogdan Khmelnitsky

The 97th Guards Mechanized Brigade (Ukrainian: 97-ма гвардійська мотострілецька дивізія, romanized: 97-ma hvardiys'ka motostrilets'ka dyviziya) was a rifle, and then a motor-rifle division of the Soviet Union's Army, before becoming a mechanized brigade of the Ukrainian Ground Forces, based in Slavuta in western Ukraine.

The full name of the division was the "97th Guards Poltava Motor-Rifle Division, Red Banner, Suvorov's, Bogdan Khmelnitsky". After the division became part of Ukrainian Armed Forces it was known as the "97th Separate Mechanized Brigade" (97-ma okrema mekhanizovana bryhada).

== History ==
=== World War II ===
The division was formed in August–September 1941 as the 343rd Rifle Division near the city of Stavropol. Over the next twelve months it was assigned to the 56th, 6th, 9th, 21st, and 24th Armies. The division took part in the defensive operations at Rostov, then in the Rostov and Barvenko-Lozovaia offensive operations. Later, it fought in the Second Battle of Kharkov, then fled eastward to take part in defensive operations near Stalingrad. On July 17, 1942, when the 21st Army joined the Stalingrad Front, the division had 2,795 men and fewer than 20 artillery pieces. After October, 1942, it was assigned to the 66th Army, which later became the 5th Guards Army.

On May 4, 1943, the division was re-designated as the 97th Guards Rifle Division. Its order of battle was as follows:

- 289th Guards Rifle Regiment from 1151st Rifle Regiment
- 292nd Guards Rifle Regiment from 1153rd Rifle Regiment
- 294th Guards Rifle Regiment from 1155th Rifle Regiment
- 232nd Guards Artillery Regiment from 903rd Artillery Regiment
- 104th Guards Antitank Battalion from 567th Antitank Battalion
- 110th Guards Sapper Battalion from 620th Sapper Battalion
- 141st Guards Signal Battalion from 791st Signal Battalion
- 100th Guards Reconnaissance Company from 402nd Reconnaissance Company

The day before its re-designation the division was assigned to the newly-formed 33rd Guards Rifle Corps. On May 2, the commander of the division, Matvei Usenko, was promoted to the rank of Major General. Just ten days later he was killed after being blown up by a land mine while crossing a road in a vehicle.

The division took part in the Battle of Kursk, along with the rest of 5th Guards Army as part of the Steppe Front. Later, it fought in the liberation of left-bank Ukraine. In September, the division was awarded the 'Poltava' honorific, along with its sister divisions, the 13th and 95th Guards Rifle Divisions. In 1944 and 1945, it took part in the Kirovograd, Uman-Botoshany, Lvov-Sandomir, Sandomir-Silesia, Upper and Lower Silesia, Berlin, and Prague offensives. The division ended the war in 32nd Guards Rifle Corps, still in 5th Guards Army.

=== Postwar ===
After World War II, the division was stationed in Austria, with the Central Group of Forces, where it remained until 1946. During that time, the division belonged to the 5th Guards Army. After its relocation to Slavuta, it became part of the 13th Army. After it moved to Slavuta, the division was downsized into the 28th Separate Guards Rifle Brigade, but became a division again on 16 September 1949. In 1957, it was reorganized from a Rifle into a Motor Rifle division. After the collapse of the Soviet Union, the division was reorganized into a Brigade, which continued to exist until November 2004, when it was disbanded.

== Commanders ==
Division commanders included:

- General-mayor Matvei Usenko (4–12 May 1943)
- Colonel Vasily Yakovlevich Kashlyayev (13–30 May 1943)
- Colonel Ivan Ivanovich Antsiferov (1 June 1943–19 April 1944, general-mayor from 25 September 1943)
- Lieutenant Colonel Mikhail Ivanovich Lashkov (20 April–22 May 1944)
- General-mayor Ivan Ivanovich Antsiferov (23 May–8 October 1944)
- Colonel Yefrem Mikhailovich Golub (9 October–28 December 1944)
- Colonel Anton Prokofyevich Garan (29 December 1944–16 June 1945)
- General-mayor Leonid Kolobov (16 June 1945–20 March 1947)
- General-mayor Fyodor Zakharovich Borisov (20 March 1947–21 February 1948)
- General-mayor Vasily Ivanovich Shcherbenko (21 February 1948–12 September 1955)
- Colonel Vasily Poyarov (12 September 1955–2 July 1958, general-mayor from 27 August 1957)
- Colonel Pyotr Yegorovich Litvinenko (2 July 1958–19 December 1961, general-mayor from 9 May 1961)
- Colonel Stepan Aleksandrovich Fedorenko (19 December 1961–15 January 1966, general-mayor from 13 April 1964)
- Colonel Pyotr Timofeyevich Latuk (15 January 1966–unknown, general-mayor from 25 October 1967)
- Colonel Leonid Ivanovich Pinchuk (general-mayor from 28 October 1976)

== Order of battle ==
During the late 1980s, the division included the following units.

- 110th Tank Regiment
- 289th Guards Motor Rifle Regiment
- 292nd Guards Motor Rifle Regiment
- 294th Guards Motor Rifle Regiment
- 232nd Guards Self-Propelled Artillery Regiment
- 1094th Guards Anti-Aircraft Rocket Regiment

== Awards ==
- September 1943 received the honorific "Poltava"
- 19?? received Order of Bogdan Khmelnitsky
- 19?? received Order of Suvorov
- 19?? received the Order of the Red Banner

== Sources ==
- Bonn, Keith E., ed. (2005). Slaughterhouse: The Handbook of the Eastern Front. Bedford, PA: Aberjona Press. ISBN 097176509X.
- Sharp, Charles C. (1995). "Red Guards", Soviet Guards Rifle and Airborne Units, 1941 to 1945, Soviet Order of Battle World War II, vol. IV. George F. Nafziger.
- Feskov, V.I.; Golikov, V.I.; Kalashnikov, K.A.; Slugin, S.A. (2013). Вооруженные силы СССР после Второй Мировой войны: от Красной Армии к Советской [The Armed Forces of the USSR after World War II: From the Red Army to the Soviet: Part 1 Land Forces] (in Russian). Tomsk: Scientific and Technical Literature Publishing. ISBN 9785895035306.
- Kalashnikov, K. A.; Dodonov, I. Yu. (2019). Высший командный состав Вооруженных сил СССР в послевоенный период: Справочные материалы (1945-1975) (in Russian). Vol. 4, Part 1. Ust-Kamenogorsk: Media-Alyans. ISBN 9786017887315.
