= 226th Rifle Division =

- Active: 1941–1945
- Country: Soviet Union
- Branch: Red Army
- Type: Infantry
- Size: Division
- Engagements: Battle of Kiev (1941); Second Battle of Kharkov; Case Blue; Battle of Stalingrad; Operation Uranus; Operation Koltso; Operation Kutuzov; Battle of the Dniepr; Battle of Kiev (1943); Rovno–Lutsk offensive Lvov–Sandomierz offensive Battle of the Dukla Pass; Carpathian-Uzhgorod offensive Western Carpathian offensive Moravia–Ostrava offensive
- Decorations: Order of the Red Banner (2nd Formation); Order of Suvorov (2nd Formation)
- Battle honours: Glukhov (2nd Formation); Kiev (2nd Formation)

Commanders
- Notable commanders: Col. Valentin Alekseevich Chugunov; Maj. Gen. Aleksandr Vasilevich Gorbatov; Col. Matvei Alekseevich Usenko; Maj. Gen. Nikolai Stepanovich Nikitchenko; Col. Vasilii Yakovlevich Petrenko; Col. Mikhail Grigorevich Tetenko; Maj. Gen. Nikolai Alekseevich Kropotin

The 226th Rifle Division was an infantry division of the Red Army, originally formed as one of the first reserve rifle divisions following the German invasion of the USSR. After being hastily organized it arrived at the front along the lower Dniepr River as part of 6th Army and in the wake of the German victory in the Kiev encirclement it fell back toward, and then past, Kharkiv and spent the winter fighting in this area. During the Second Battle of Kharkov in May 1942 it scored early successes but was soon forced back by counterattacking panzers and barely escaped destruction in the first phases of the German summer offensive. After rebuilding in the Reserve of the Supreme High Command the division returned to the front north of Stalingrad where it joined the 66th Army. It took heavy losses in one of the last efforts to break through to the city before Operation Uranus cut off the German 6th Army, but it still played an important role in the reduction of the pocket during Operation Ring and as a result was redesignated as the 95th Guards Rifle Division in May 1943.

A new 226th was formed on July 22 in the 60th Army of Central Front based on two rifle brigades, one of which had fought at Stalingrad. By this time the Battle of Kursk had ended in a Soviet victory and Central Front was already involved in battles to reduce the salient held by German 9th Army around Oryol before breaking out into northeastern Ukraine. The division rapidly won distinctions, including two battle honours and two decorations, by the following February. It forced a crossing of the Dniepr River north of Kyiv in late September, and 23 of its men were made Heroes of the Soviet Union, several posthumously. During the German counterattacks west of Kyiv in late November, it was encircled at Korosten and forced to break out with considerable losses. In May 1944 it was assigned to the 11th Rifle Corps of 18th Army and served in this Corps almost continuously for the duration. The 226th broke into the Carpathian Mountains in the late stages of the Lvov–Sandomierz Offensive and thereafter took part in the battles for Czechoslovakia as part of 1st Guards Army and, in the last weeks, 38th Army. Its subunits gained additional honors during this fighting before the division was disbanded in the summer of 1945.

== 1st Formation ==
A division numbered as the 226th began forming in March 1941 in the Moscow Military District but in April it was moved to the Kharkov Military District and disbanded to provide a cadre for the 3rd Airborne Brigade.

Another division numbered as the 226th officially formed on July 15 at Orikhiv, Zaporizhzhia Oblast, in the Odessa Military District. Its personnel were drawn from militia and reservists from throughout the District and was very short of heavy weapons and equipment of all kinds and had only about six weeks for organizing and training. Once formed, its official order of battle, based on an abbreviated version of the shtat (table of organization and equipment) of September 13, 1939, was as follows, although it would be modified, temporarily or permanently, on several occasions:

- 985th Rifle Regiment
- 987th Rifle Regiment
- 989th Rifle Regiment
- 875th Artillery Regiment (later 806th)
- 329th Antitank Battalion (from January 30, 1942)
- 409th Antiaircraft Battery (later 538th Antiaircraft Battalion)
- 348th Reconnaissance Company
- 553rd Sapper Battalion
- 625th Signal Battalion (until September 9, 1942, then 153rd Signal Company)
- 328th Medical/Sanitation Battalion
- 290th Chemical Defense (Anti-gas) Company
- 417th Motor Transport Company
- 298th Field Bakery (later 717th)
- 52nd Divisional Veterinary Hospital (later 681st)
- 986th Field Postal Station
- 833rd Field Office of the State Bank

Col. Valentin Alekseevich Chugunov was appointed to command on the day the division formed. By the beginning of August the Odessa Military District had come under command of Southern Front, and as of August 5 it was considered part of the active army. On August 31 the 226th was assigned to the 6th Army, which was rebuilding after having been destroyed near Uman at the beginning of the month. The division was still short of equipment and the absence of an antitank battalion is particularly noteworthy.

On September 2, Colonel Chugunov was replaced by Kombrig Aleksandr Vasilevich Gorbatov. As his old-style rank suggests, this officer had been a victim of the Great Purge; he had been dismissed from the Red Army in September 1937, reinstated in March 1938, and then arrested in October of that year. Sentenced to 15 years imprisonment he worked as a manual laborer in the Kolyma gold mines until he was released and rehabilitated in March 1941. His rank would be modernized to major general on December 27.

=== Kiev Pocket ===
At the start of September the Southwestern Front was occupying a deep salient surrounded on three sides by German forces. Army Group Center's 2nd Panzer Group was already pushing south while Army Group South's 1st Panzer Group had forced a crossing of the Dniepr River at Kremenchuk, just northwest of the boundary between 6th Army and Southwestern Front's 38th Army. The situation reached a crisis on September 15 when the two panzer groups linked up at Lokhvytsia. With a huge gap ripped in the Red Army's front, 6th Army redeployed by forced marches to a line running northwest from Krasnohrad to the area northeast of Poltava. By the start of October the 226th was in the reserves of the rebuilding Southwestern Front.

== Second Battle of Kharkov ==
The anti-tank rifle crews of Red Army men Semyon Fyodorovich Sudarov (killed 14 July 1943) and Nikita Kalistratovich Likhanov of the 989th Rifle Regiment in firing positions on the Southwestern Front, 1942

As the main German offensive focused on Moscow, Southwestern Front fell back toward Kharkiv, which fell to the German 6th Army on October 24. Marshal S. K. Timoshenko, who was now in command of the Southwestern Theatre (Direction), was ordered to establish a line from Kastornoye, along the Oskol River and then to the Mius River. At this time the 226th was in 21st Army of Southwestern Front as part of Operational Group Nedvigin, along with the 81st Rifle Division; by the beginning of December this Group also contained the 297th Rifle Division.

In late December, as Army Group Center was being pushed back from Moscow, Timoshenko proposed an operation to retake the Oryol-Kursk region with the 21st and 40th Armies. When the offensive began on January 1, 1942, the objectives had been shifted southward to Oboyan and Kharkiv and over the next 70 days, while gaining ground, the two Armies were unable to reach the latter. Meanwhile, the 6th, 9th and 57th Armies broke the German front along the Donets and carved out a salient up to 75 km deep between Izium and Barvinkove.

During March the 226th was transferred to 38th Army. In the same month it took part in a battle to create a bridgehead over the Donets at Staryi Saltiv, due east of Kharkiv, but took heavy casualties in the process. This would serve as a springboard for the upcoming offensive. This was followed by a major regrouping of the forces of Southwestern Front, which was complicated by the arrival of the spring rasputitsa. Timoshenko submitted a plan to the STAVKA on April 10 which called for a two-pronged offensive to encircle and liberate Kharkiv; 6th Army would attack northward from the Izium–Barvenkove salient while the 21st, 28th and 38th Armies would strike westward. The 38th Army strike force would consist of the 226th, 124th and 300th Rifle Divisions plus one regiment of the 81st Division. This would be backed by two tank brigades and almost all of the Army's artillery assets, while the remainder of the 81st and another tank brigade formed the second echelon.

When the offensive began on May 12 the strike force was deployed on the sector of Dragunovka, Peschanoe, and Piatnitskoe within the Staryi Saltiv bridgehead. The 226th was on the right flank, tying in with 28th Army's 13th Guards Rifle Division to the north. These divisions faced the 513th Regiment of the German 294th Infantry Division. Following a 60-minute artillery preparation, including a 15-20-minute air raid, the attack began at 0730 hours and gained up to 10 kilometers (6.2 miles) during the day, with the 226th making the most progress and capturing Hill 124 in the process. It had the 36th Tank Brigade in direct support and by day's end had broken through the German tactical defense before beginning a pursuit of the defeated elements of the 294th and 71st Infantry Divisions and taking the key village of Nepokrytaya after a brief battle.

During the first half of the following day, 38th Army's shock group made impressive gains as the German lines fell back; taking advantage of this success the 13th Guards and 244th Rifle Divisions of 28th Army also advanced. However, starting at 1300 hours, a concerted German counterthrust, led by 3rd and 23rd Panzer Divisions and supported by three infantry regiments, struck the 124th and 81st Divisions "on the nose" and sent them reeling back. Under this pressure, the shaken rifle divisions withdrew as best they could to the Bolshaia Babka River. Overnight on May 13/14 the 226th retook Nepokrytaya and attempted to develop this success to Mikhailovka Pervaya. By morning the two panzer divisions had concentrated their main forces and at 1000 hours attacked toward Peremoga with air support. The division was forced to again abandon Nepokrytaya and withdraw to the Bolshaia Babka. While German efforts to reduce the Staryi Saltiv bridgehead were repulsed these reverses temporarily ended 38th Army's role in the offensive.

38th Army went back to the attack on May 18; the 226th and 124th Divisions gained up to 2 km and the depleted tank brigades were ordered to exploit, but this came to nothing. While this was happening a disaster was brewing in the Izium–Barvenkove salient where three Soviet armies were encircled by May 24 and soon destroyed. The 226th escaped this fate, but had been significantly depleted during the offensive.

=== Operation Wilhelm ===
In the aftermath of the offensive the 28th Army took over responsibility for the defenses of the Staryi Saltiv bridgehead and the 226th came under its command. As a preliminary to the main German summer offensive Gen. F. Paulus, commander of 6th Army, intended to eliminate the bridgehead in a pincer attack in order to gain crossing points over the Donets. Altogether the bridgehead contained seven rifle divisions, all of which were understrength, backed by four weak tank brigades, three more rifle divisions and three cavalry divisions. The assault began early on June 10 and took the defenders by surprise. The four infantry divisions of VIII Army Corps took only two days to clear the bridgehead and capture Vovchansk. Meanwhile, the III Motorized Corps broke through the defenses of 38th Army to the south. Under the circumstances the 28th Army began retreating almost as soon as the German attack was underway. Rainy weather began on June 11 and this slowed the advance, along with defensive actions and counterattacks by the tank brigades. By the time the pincers closed on June 15 most of the Soviet forces had escaped, losing 24,800 men taken prisoner.

On June 21 General Gorbatov left the division to take up the post of inspector of cavalry for Southwestern Front. He eventually became commander of the 3rd Army and commandant of Berlin postwar, and gained the rank of army general before his retirement, as well as being made a Hero of the Soviet Union. He was replaced by Col. Matvei Alekseevich Usenko. This officer had previously commanded the 1st Airborne Corps and the 2nd Cavalry Corps, but on May 16 had had his rank reduced from major general to colonel after having been given a suspended sentence for "unskillful command of forces" on April 9.

== Operation Blue ==
By June 28 the division had been subordinated to 21st Army, still in Southwestern Front. On the same date the main German offensive began. 21st and 40th Armies were the chief targets for encirclement by Army Group South in the initial phase. 21st Army had seven rifle divisions in the first echelon and two (the 226th and 343rd) in the second. Once the storm broke, during the month of July, the 226th and its Army could do little except stage a costly fighting withdrawal across the steppes. By August 1 it had been incorporated into the new Stalingrad Front, fighting west of the Don River, but on August 6 the division was withdrawn to the Reserve of the Supreme High Command for rebuilding after distributing most of its remaining manpower to other divisions. It was assigned to 4th Reserve Army and was based at Buguruslan during this period. Colonel Usenko left the division on August 14 and was sidelined until December 23 when he took over the 343rd (later 97th Guards Rifle Division). He was replaced by Maj. Gen. Nikolai Stepanovich Nikitchenko, who had served in the training establishment before taking command of the 210th Rifle Brigade.

== Battle of Stalingrad ==
After rebuilding, in late September the personnel of the 226th were noted as being roughly 80 percent of Uzbek, Bashkir, Tajik, and Ukrainian nationality, with most of the remaining 20 percent being Russian. By now it had been reassigned to the 10th Reserve Army in the Moscow Military District and on October 18 it returned to the active army as part of Don Front where it joined the 66th Army. This Army was located due north of Stalingrad, facing the corridor from the Don to the Volga that German 6th Army had forced during late August.

=== Fourth Kotluban Offensive ===
Since early September the Red Army had made three attacks to sever the corridor and link up with 62nd Army in the city itself, with little success. The plan for the renewed offensive called for a shock group deployed on the right (west) flank of 66th Army and the left flank of 24th Army to penetrate the German defenses in the 15 km-wide sector north and northeast of Kuzmichi and to advance southeastward toward Orlovka. It was to begin on October 20 and achieve its objective five days later. The 66th Army shock group consisted of the 212th, 62nd, 252nd and 226th from the Reserve, supported by the full-strength 91st, 121st and 64th Tank Brigades, each with a complement of roughly 53 tanks. The first three divisions, each with a tank brigade in direct support, formed the first echelon and would attack from the upper reaches of the Sukhaya Mechetka Balka to northeast of Kuzmichi, with the 226th in second echelon. The immediate objectives were Hills 112.7 and 139.7 and, ultimately, Orlovka. Fire support consisted of 664 guns and mortars and Guards-mortars from 12 regiments. The Army's remaining nine rifle divisions were to provide supporting attacks, but were all severely understrength. In light of earlier costly failures the commander of Don Front, Lt. Gen. K. K. Rokossovskii later admitted that he expected the assault to achieve very little:

We were given permission to use seven infantry divisions from the GHQ Reserve for the operation but received no additional supporting means in the shape of artillery, armour, or aircraft. The chances of success were remote, especially as the enemy had well fortified positions. Since the main objective in the operation fell to 66th Army, I had a conversation with Malinovsky, who begged me not to commit the seven new divisions to action. "We'll only waste them," he said... Happily only two [actually four] of the promised seven new divisions arrived by the deadline... As expected, the attack failed. The armies of the Don Front were unable to penetrate the enemy's defenses...

At the end of October 21 the 212th was reported as attacking south of Hill 130.7, having advanced 300m from its jumping-off positions after encountering heavy fire. The next day the 252nd captured the region of the Motor Tractor Station 8 km northeast of Kuzmichi. On the following day the 226th Division was committed in an increasingly futile effort to maintain the offensive. By October 27 it was clear to both sides that it had run its course and although the STAVKA claimed German casualties of up to 7,000 personnel and 57 tanks the formerly fresh rifle divisions were no longer combat-effective.

=== Operation Uranus and Operation Ring ===
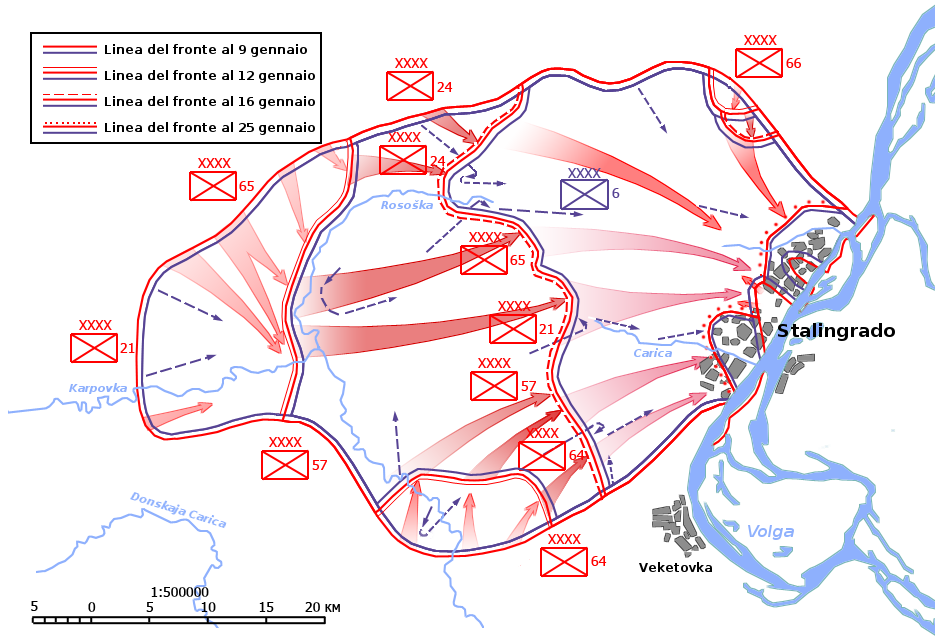
Operation Ring. Note position of 66th Army.

As Operation Uranus began on November 19 the division remained in its former positions, now in the first echelon of 66th Army. The Army did not have an active role in the offensive, but was expected to tie down enemy forces through local attacks and raids to prevent them shifting westward to where the penetration was to take place.

Following the encirclement of German 6th Army the 66th Army began its share of operations to reduce the pocket. Starting around December 3 the 226th, 116th and 64th Rifle Divisions regularly assaulted the 16th Panzer Division's motorcycle battalion and 1st Battalion, 79th Panzergrenadier Regiment in the vicinity of Hill 145.1, Hill 147.6, and the sector to the northwest. These attacks forced 6th Army to dispatch the 384th Infantry Division's pioneer battalion to reinforce the sector. Between December 26 and 31 attacks by the 116th, 226th and 343rd Rifle Divisions struck the hilltop positions of 16th and 24th Panzer Divisions north and northwest of Orlovka. Over the course of that week the already heavily depleted German units lost 712 men.

From January 6–9, 1943, Don Front's 21st, 65th and 66th Armies conducted intense but deliberate attacks against the north face of the German pocket to seize key terrain for the upcoming final offensive and to force the commitment of whatever reserves might still be available. The 226th and 116th again struck the 16th Panzers and over two days inflicted 179 additional casualties. On January 8 General Rokossovskii issued an ultimatum to the trapped Axis forces, demanding their surrender, but this was rejected. When the offensive was renewed on January 10 the commander of 66th Army, Maj. Gen. A. S. Zhadov, decided to conduct his main attacks in the 7 km-wide sector from Hill 147.6 northwest to Hill 139.7. He formed a shock group consisting of the 99th, 116th and 226th Divisions, plus the 124th Rifle Brigade, in first echelon, backed up by the 7th Guards Heavy Tank Regiment (KV tanks) on the left wing and the 64th Division in second echelon. Still facing the two panzer divisions of XI Army Corps the ultimate objective was the village of Gorodishche in Stalingrad's western suburbs.

The artillery preparation began at 0805 hours on January 10 and lasted 55 minutes, but the ground assault still faced stubborn initial resistance. 66th Army's attacks were still largely intended to pin German forces in place as the main blows were directed at the western perimeter of the pocket. Late on January 11 the 16th Panzers reported two 700m-wide breaches in its lines that could not be closed; the next day it had just nine tanks still serviceable. During that day the Army's shock group worked to widen the breaches and although the 16th continued to hold out its losses would force it to withdraw to stronger defenses on January 13.

When the final stage of Operation Ring began on January 25 the Army converged on XI Corps' defenses from the eastern edge of Gorodishche, east through Orlovka to the high ground west of Spartanovka. These attacks forced the German Corps to abandon the system of strongpoints around Orlovka and fall back towards the factory district of Stalingrad without any heavy weapons. The 226th and 343rd jointly liberated Orlovka, and advanced as far as the west bank of the Mechetka River. On the 28th the 226th thrust southward from the vicinity of Zhemchuzhnaya Street, crossed the river and gained a lodgement in the northern edge of the Tractor Factory village. On February 1, 66th Army attacked at 1000 hrs. into the last enemy-held positions in the village. By this time the 226th had no more than 1,000 front-line infantry remaining. The following day the remaining Germans in the northern pocket laid down their arms.

When the fighting at Stalingrad concluded, the division was first assigned to the Stalingrad Group of Forces on February 6. On March 13 it went into the Reserve of the Supreme High Command with the rest of 66th Army. In April the Army was re-designated as 5th Guards Army, and on May 4 the division became the 95th Guards Rifle Division.

== 2nd Formation ==
A new 226th was formed on July 22 in 60th Army of Central Front, based on the 42nd Rifle Brigade and the 129th Rifle Brigade.

=== 42nd Rifle Brigade ===
This unit had been formed from training units in the Altai region of the Siberian Military District in October–November 1941. Late in November it was assigned to the Reserve of the Supreme High Command and began moving west by rail; joined the 3rd Shock Army in the Ostashkov area by January 1, 1942. On January 9 the 42nd was one of the Army's assault units when it began its offensive in the Toropets direction. By February the brigade was fighting south of Demyansk, part of the force that encircled the German II Army Corps in and around that town. In March it was moved to the 2nd formation of the 1st Guards Rifle Corps in the reserves of Northwestern Front, on the north flank of the pocket. The German 16th Army re-established contact with the pocket in the spring and during July the 42nd was shifted to the south side of the salient, becoming part of the 1st Shock Army. During that month and the next it took part in unsuccessful attacks to cut the German corridor before it was returned to the Reserve of the Supreme High Command and railed south.

By September 13 the brigade, under command of Col. M. S. Batrakov, was in Stalingrad, part of the 62nd Army. It remained in the fight for the city until December when its remnants were withdrawn across the Volga and once more into the Reserve of the Supreme High Command, moving to the Volga Military District to be rebuilt. By the end of February 1943 it was in the reserves of Central Front and took part in the last phase of the fighting that created the Kursk salient. In late March it consisted of four rifle battalions, each with three companies (although the fourth battalion was noted as "not at full strength"); one artillery battalion of 76mm cannon; and one tank company. The tank company was non-standard and may have been made up of Lend-Lease equipment. By this time the brigade was assigned to the 24th Rifle Corps and in April it became part of 60th Army in Central Front.

=== 129th Rifle Brigade ===
The 129th was formed from December 1941 to April 1942 in the Ural Military District, and then in May was sent to the 8th Guards Rifle Corps in the reserves of Western Front. This Corps was assigned to 20th Army in July and took part in the First Rzhev–Sychyovka offensive operation beginning on August 4. By August 23 it had taken part in the liberation of the village of Karmanovo but while the German lines bent they never broke and the 8th Guards Corps suffered 25 percent casualties. In September the brigade was removed to the Reserve of the Supreme High Command and shifted south to Bryansk Front. There it joined the 60th Army for two months before moving to the Front reserves. In January 1943 the 129th was moved to Voronezh Front and became part of 40th Army north of Belgorod, but within a month it had returned to 60th Army, which by now was also in the same Front before moving to Central Front in April. Later that month the brigade was assigned to the 24th Rifle Corps. 60th Army was located in the westernmost sector of the Kursk salient and did not directly participate in its defense during Operation Zitadelle. As it prepared for the offensive that would follow the 129th was merged with the 42nd Brigade.

Once formed the division had an order of battle very similar to that of the 1st formation:

- 985th Rifle Regiment
- 987th Rifle Regiment
- 989th Rifle Regiment
- 730th Artillery Regiment (later 806th)
- 329th Antitank Battalion
- 348th Reconnaissance Company
- 553rd Sapper Battalion
- 625th Signal Battalion (later 153rd Signal Company)
- 328th Medical/Sanitation Battalion
- 290th Chemical Defense (Anti-gas) Company
- 417th Motor Transport Company
- 298th Field Bakery (later 299th)
- 52nd Divisional Veterinary Hospital
- 1774th Field Postal Station
- 1731st Field Office of the State Bank

It was noted that the personnel of the division were 90 percent of Russian nationality. Due to combining the artillery assets of the two brigades the 730th had a non-standard organization:

- 1st Battalion - two batteries each of four 76mm cannon; one battery of four 122mm howitzers
- 2nd Battalion - three batteries each of four 76mm cannon
- 3rd Battalion - one battery of four 76mm cannon; one battery of four 122mm howitzers

In short, while it contained the 24 cannon of the combined brigades it was short one battery of howitzers. When this was eventually rectified it was redesignated as the 806th Regiment.

Col. Vasilii Yakovlevich Petrenko took command; he had been leading the 796th Rifle Regiment of the 141st Rifle Division which was also in 60th Army at the time. The newly formed division remained in 24th Rifle Corps, which also contained the 112th Rifle Division and the 248th Rifle Brigade.

== Into Ukraine ==
Central Front had begun its part in Operation Kutuzov, the counteroffensive against the Oryol salient, on July 15. By August 20 it was closing on the Hagen position at the base of the salient in conjunction with Bryansk Front. The offensive was renewed on August 26 with Central Front striking the 9th Army's right flank east of Karachev and 2nd Army's center at Sevsk and east of Klintsy. Sevsk was liberated the same day and a deep penetration was made east of Klintsy. Army Group Center counterattacked northwest of Sevsk on August 29 with some success, but this led to 60th Army making a sudden thrust in the direction of Esman, placing it roughly 40 km behind 2nd Army's south flank. On August 30 the 226th took part in the liberation of Hlukhiv and the following day received its first honorific:

Glukhov ... 226th Rifle Division (Colonel Petrenko, Vasilii Yakovlevich)... The troops who participated in the battles near Sevsk, Glukhov and Rylsk, by the order of the Supreme High Command of 31 August 1943, and a commendation in Moscow, are given a salute of 12 artillery salvoes from 124 guns.

Following this victory, on September 9 forces of Central Front crossed the Desna River south of Novhorod-Siverskyi and at Otsekin and between September 16 and 18 the 7th Guards Mechanized Corps aimed a two-pronged thrust northward across the Desna on either side of Chernihiv which collapsed the south flank of 2nd Army.

=== Battle of the Dniepr ===
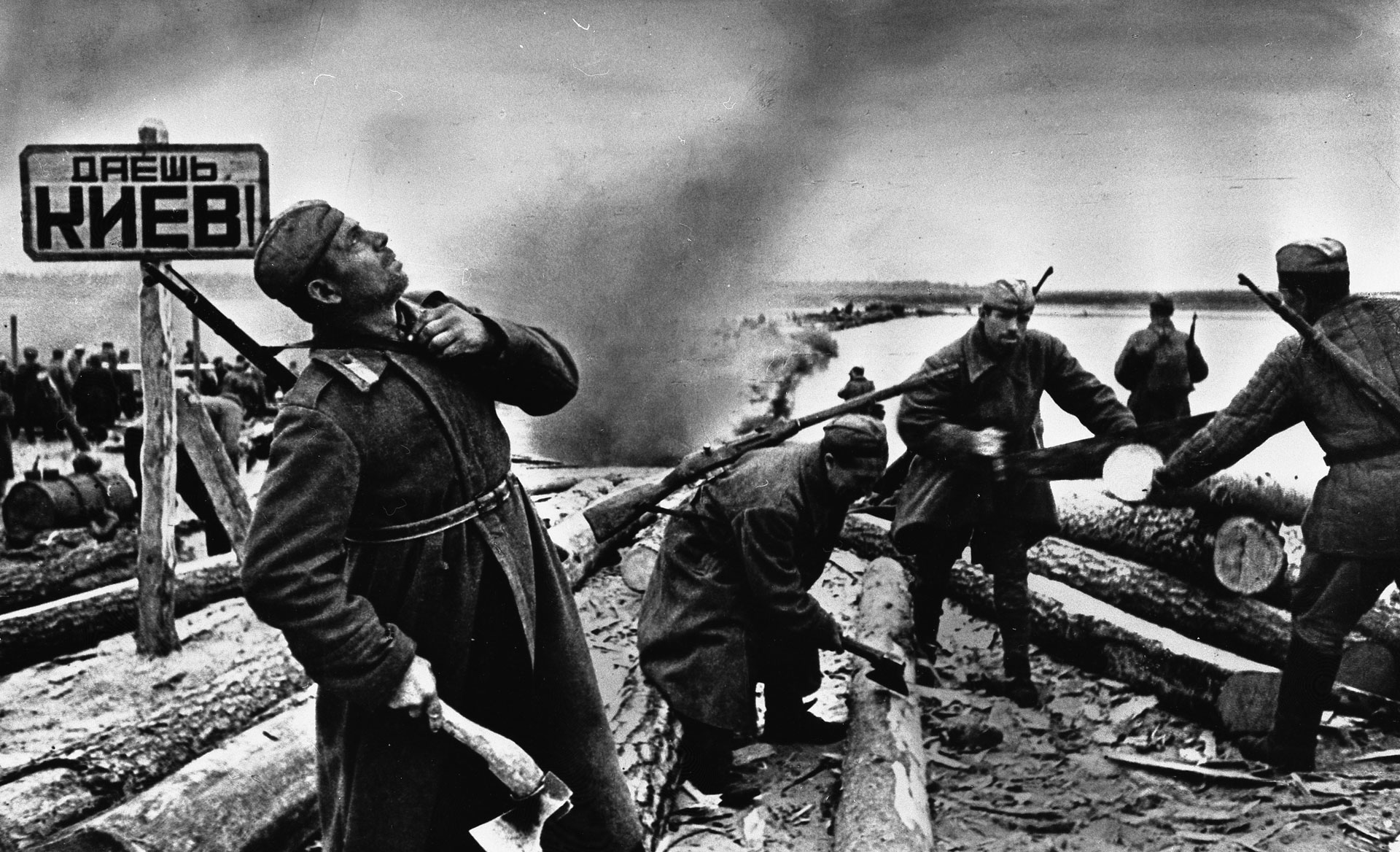
Red Army soldiers prepare crossing means on the bank of the Dniepr

The Front now continued its advance toward the Dniepr in the direction of Kyiv. On September 26 the 226th reached the river opposite the village of Tolokunskaya Rudnya in the Vyshhorod Raion north of Kyiv. Colonel Petrenko immediately gave orders to begin crossing the next day using improvised means. The effort was led by the 985th Rifle Regiment, commanded by Lt. Col. Ivan Nikitovich Posadskii. The first objective was to clear a low, sandspit island in mid-channel as a springboard to the west bank proper. This was soon accomplished, with the defenders being killed or taken prisoner. The first unit ready to cross the main channel was the regiment's machine gun company, led by Sr. Lt. Fyodor Timofeevich Zharov, which seized the village after eliminating up to two platoons of German troops, but Zharov himself was killed. Posadskii now led his 2nd Battalion to the far bank, but coming under heavy small arms and artillery fire the soldiers went to ground. In order to rally the attack he stood up at full height and urged on his men by shouting "For the Party! For the Motherland!" They soon entered hand-to-hand fighting in the German trenches which ended with the surviving defenders withdrawing. Posadskii was badly wounded by mortar fragments and despite being evacuated to the east bank he died of his injuries on September 29. The bridgehead was soon struck with significant counterattacks but these were repulsed. On October 17 Petrenko and 22 of his soldiers, including Posadskii and Zharov, would be made Heroes of the Soviet Union for their roles in this crossing operation, several posthumously.

Earlier that month 60th Army had been transferred to Voronezh Front (as of October 20 1st Ukrainian Front) and on October 10 the division's strength return showed 6,652 personnel on the rolls, armed with 22 82mm and 12 120mm mortars; eight 76mm regimental guns; plus 20 76mm cannon and eight 122mm howitzers in its artillery regiment.

=== Battles for Kiev ===
24th Corps' sector in the Dmitrievka area, where the Army had had its greatest success, was struck by the 7th Panzer Division on October 17; after repeated attacks it broke through the Corps frontage. During the rest of the day heavy fighting that also involved the 1st Guards Cavalry Corps led to two German regiments being encircled although they broke out by evening in the direction of Manuilsk at the cost of significant losses. During October 18–23 the 60th Army was engaged in intensive fighting as German forces repeatedly counterattacked along the south bank of the Teteriv River. Fending off these attacks expended a great deal of ammunition which forced a postponement of a new Soviet offensive until after October 23. The cost of this fighting is reflected in the returns of October 31 that show the 226th down to 4,465 personnel on strength. In the plan for this offensive the 60th Army would attack toward Rovy with nine rifle divisions, including the 226th, before driving south along the left bank of the Irpin River in the direction of Kiev. 24th Corps was in the Army's center deployed in a single echelon; it was now supported by the 150th Tank Brigade. Its breakthrough sector was 4 km wide and it was supported by 93.5 guns and mortars of at least 76mm calibre per kilometre.

The offensive began on November 3 and soon led to a breakthrough. Two days later the 4th Panzer Army was withdrawing from Kiev to the southwest and 60th Army advanced 20 km along its left wing. 24th Corps' 248th Rifle Brigade on the Corps' right flank made little progress but the 226th and 112th Divisions made significant gains. On November 6 the Corps continued its pursuit on both flanks while beating off counterattacks in the center. 38th Army had been earmarked for the liberation of the Ukrainian capital and it did so in the early hours of that day. In recognition of its part in this victory the division earned its second honorific:

KIEV... 226th Rifle Division (Colonel Petrenko, Vasilii Yakovlevich)... The troops who participated in the battle for Kiev, by the order of the Supreme High Command of 6 November 1943, and a commendation in Moscow, are given a salute of 24 artillery salvoes from 324 guns.

Over the next three days the 24th Corps was able to advance steadily at a rate of 10 km per day and on November 10 its Army was fighting in the area of Ivankiv while reaching the east bank of the Teteriv along the rest of its front. It forced the river the next day and made a further advance of up to 25 km. During November 13 the German 291st Infantry Division was falling back in the sector between the Uzh River and the Kiev–Korosten rail line on a broad front opposite one corps of 13th Army and the 24th and 77th Rifle Corps of 60th Army. In the absence of effective resistance the advance continued and on November 17 Korosten was liberated and occupied by the 226th along with a 10 km front; it was reinforced with the 150th Tanks. As of November 15 the division's personnel strength had declined further to 3,838 soldiers. The division was awarded the Order of the Red Banner on November 18.

==== Kiev Strategic Defensive Operation ====
During the rest of November the 1st Ukrainian Front was on the defensive, under attack by the 4th Panzer Army. The 291st Infantry remained in the Korosten area regrouping and receiving reinforcements from the 147th Reserve Division, Corps Detachment 'C', and a battalion of assault guns. On November 24 this grouping launched a counterattack against the 226th's flanks and encircled it. The Army commander, Lt. Gen. I. D. Chernyakhovsky, categorically ordered Colonel Petrenko to hold Korosten at all costs during the next 48 hours until the arrival of the 6th Guards Rifle Division in the area. Meanwhile, the Front commander, Army Gen. N. F. Vatutin, transferred the 8th and 18th Rifle Divisions from 13th Army to reinforce the 60th and ordered Chernyakhovksy to personally organize and direct the fighting for Korosten. This continued until the end of the month; the 226th managed to escape with significant losses and the town remained in German hands at the end of the battle.

== Into Western Ukraine and Czechoslovakia ==
In December the division was transferred to the 23rd Rifle Corps, still in 60th Army. During the Rovno–Lutsk offensive it played an important role in the liberation of Shepetivka and in consequence on February 17, 1944, was awarded the Order of Suvorov, 2nd Degree.

By March the division's front line rifle strength was badly eroded; on March 20 the 987th Regiment had only 339 "bayonets" (infantry and sappers) but had a total of 144 officers, 163 NCOs, and 809 enlisted men assigned. In addition to the small arms carried by the "bayonets" the Regiment had 16 light machine guns; six heavy machine guns; 28 antitank rifles; four 45mm antitank guns; two 76mm regimental guns, eight 82mm mortars and six 120mm mortars. In other words, most of the Regiment's combat support units were at nearly full strength. By the beginning of April the division was assigned to 1st Guards Army, still in 1st Ukrainian Front, and in May it was reassigned to the 11th Rifle Corps of 18th Army in the same Front. Colonel Petrenko left the division on May 22, soon taking command of the 107th Rifle Division until postwar and eventually gaining the rank of lieutenant general before his retirement in 1976. Col. Mikhail Grigorevich Tetenko took over command of the 226th. By June the composition of the division had changed considerably. Its personnel were now 85 percent Ukrainian, with 5 percent Russian, 5 percent Tatar, and 5 percent Uzbek. It was further noted that 60 percent were from the year groups 1893-1904 (51-40 year olds) while nearly all of the remainder were from the year groups 1905–1916.

=== Lvov–Sandomierz Offensive ===
The main part of the offensive began on July 13 but 18th Army, on the Front's southern wing, remained inactive until the German/Hungarian Stanislav grouping was defeated. At 0315 hours on July 21 the Army received orders to penetrate the German defenses north of Cheremkhiv on the morning of July 23 and develop an offensive in the direction of Otyniia with the objective of capturing Bohorodchany by the end of July 25. The assault was led by a shock group composed of the 226th and the 66th Guards Rifle Division and soon overcame resistance from the Hungarian 16th Infantry Division, penetrating 4–5 km into the defenses during the day. Subsequently, the Army advanced towards Dolyna in order to drive the Hungarian Army into the mountains. While Bohorodchany was not reached on schedule the Army's right flank advanced as much as 20 km on July 27. By the start of August the 18th and 1st Guards Armies had effectively cleared the foothills of the Carpathians and set the stage for a subsequent advance into the Carpatho-Ukraine.

=== Into Slovakia ===
Later in the month 18th Army was transferred to 4th Ukrainian Front. On September 8 Colonel Tetenko was replaced in command by Maj. Gen. Nikolai Alekseevich Kropotin. This officer had previously led the 1st Guards Rifle Division but in April had been severely shell-shocked and spent several months recovering in hospital. He would command the 226th into the postwar. Later in September the division, still in 11th Corps, went back to 1st Guards Army, where it would remain for the duration. Beginning on September 9 the Front attempted to break through the positions of First Panzer Army into the Dukla Pass in the Laborec Highlands toward Uzhhorod. This made slow progress to begin with but by the start of October began to make headway in part due to the removal of a panzer division and on October 6 the pass was taken. By the 14th the Front was on the move again, slowly advancing south of Dukla Pass through German fortified positions; 1st Guards Army was attempting to force some of the smaller passes farther east.

Through November and into December, as the 2nd and 3rd Ukrainian Fronts encircled Budapest, the 1st Guards Army pushed on toward the towns of Humenné and Michalovce, which were taken by 107th Rifle Corps. In November the 226th left 11th Corps to serve as a separate division under direct Army command, and by the beginning of 1945 it had returned to 11th Corps which was now under direct command of the Front, and the Corps was back in 1st Guards Army before the next offensive.

=== Western Carpathian and Moravia–Ostrava Offensives ===
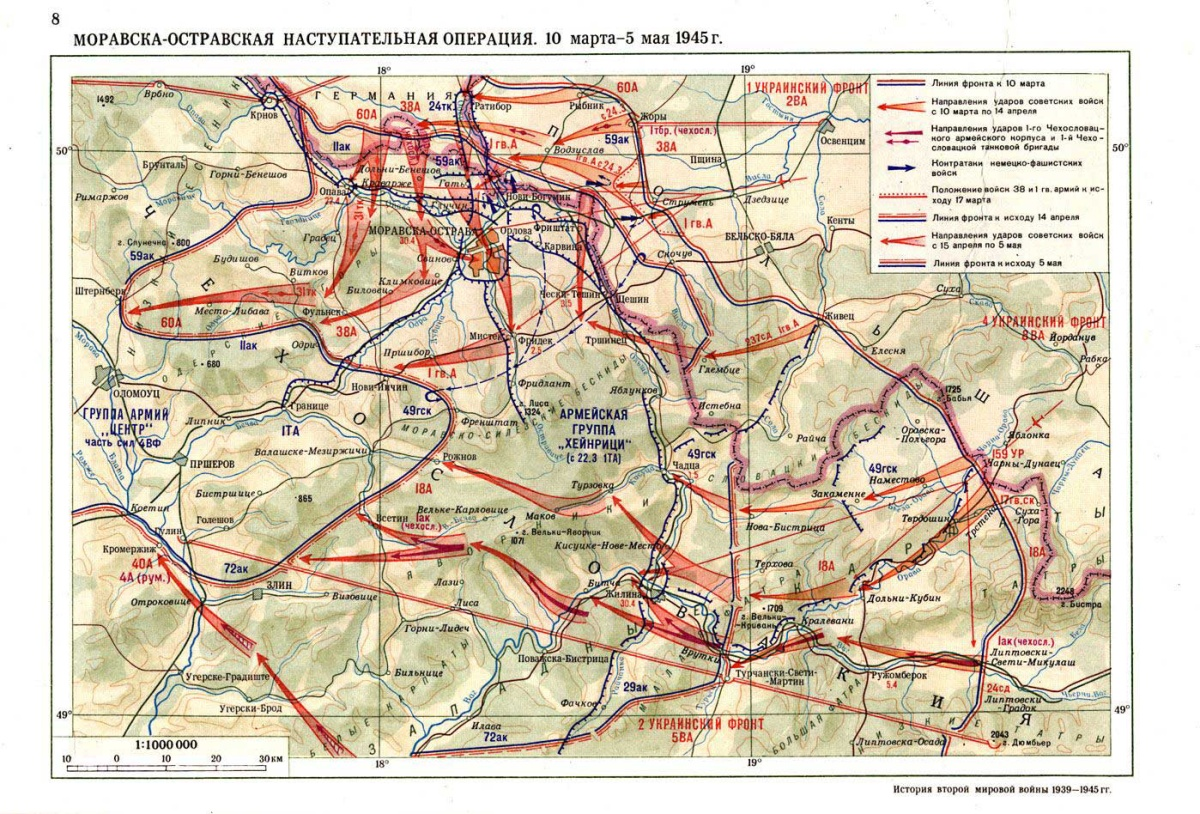
Moravia–Ostrava Offensive. Note locations of 1st Guards and 38th Armies.

Col. Gen. A. A. Grechko launched his Army on its next operation on January 18 against the German XI Army Corps over the Ondava River through such mountainous terrain that only 42 tanks could be effectively used. The 107th and 11th Rifle Corps heavily damaged the 253rd Infantry Division, throwing back its remnants up to 22 km and on January 20 took the city of Prešov. Near the end of the offensive the 226th took part in the capture of the city of Bielsko and in recognition the 329th Antitank Battalion would be awarded the Order of Bogdan Khmelnitsky, 3rd Degree, on April 5. The 226th's last offensive began on March 24 into what is now the eastern part of the Czech Republic. The advance crossed the upper reaches of the Oder River but was then held up by German resistance east of Frenštát pod Radhoštěm until April 5. By the time of the German surrender the division had advanced as far as Olomouc; on June 4 the 553rd Sapper Battalion would receive the Order of Bogdan Khmelnitsky, 3rd Degree, for its part in seizing this city. Later in April the division would be transferred to the 101st Rifle Corps of 38th Army, still in 4th Ukrainian Front.

== Postwar ==
At the time of the German surrender the men and women of the division shared the full title 226th Rifle, Glukhov–Kiev, Order of the Red Banner, Order of Suvorov Division. (Russian: 226-я стрелковая Глуховско-Киевская Краснознамённая ордена Суворова дивизия.) On May 28 the three rifle regiments would be rewarded for their roles in the fighting for Ostrava and Žilina in the final offensive into western Slovakia and eastern Moravia. The 985th and 987th each received the Order of Suvorov, 3rd Degree, while the 989th was given the Order of Kutuzov, 3rd Degree. In addition, the 625th Signal Battalion won the Order of Bogdan Khmelnitsky, 3rd Degree. The division was disbanded "in place" a few months later with the Northern Group of Forces.
