= Nikolai Nikitchenko =

Soviet Army major general

Nikolai Stepanovich Nikitchenko
- Nikitchenko, 1945
- Born: 17 December 1901; Starodub, Chernigov Governorate, Russian Empire
- Died: 1 April 1975 (aged 73) Moscow, Soviet Union
- Allegiance: Russian SFSR; Soviet Union
- Branch: Red Army (later Soviet Army)
- Service years: 1918–1952
- Rank: Major general
- Commands: 226th Rifle Division (became 95th Guards Rifle Division)
- Conflicts: Russian Civil War; World War II
- Awards: Order of Lenin; Order of the Red Banner (4); Order of Kutuzov, 2nd class

Nikolai Stepanovich Nikitchenko (Russian: Никола́й Степа́нович Ники́тченко; 17 December 1901 – 1 April 1975) was a Soviet Army major general.

== Early life and Russian Civil War ==
A Russian, Nikolai Stepanovich Nikitchenko was born on 17 December 1901 in Starodub, Chernigov Governorate. During the Russian Civil War, Nikitchenko joined the Red Army in the settlement of Unecha on 27 October 1918 and was sent as a Red Army man to the commandant's platoon of the 1st Ukrainian Division. With the division, he fought on the Southern Front against the Volunteer Army. In February 1919 he was wounded and hospitalized until June. After recovering in June he was sent to the convalescent detachment of the 19th Reserve Rifle Regiment at Bryansk, where he served as an assistant platoon commander in the regimental reconnaissance detachment from February 1920. In December 1920 he transferred to the 22nd Rifle Regiment at Liski as assistant platoon commander in the reconnaissance detachment. With the 22nd, he fought in the suppression of the Kolesnikov revolt near Ostrogozhsk. In April 1921 he was sent to study at the 27th Oryol Infantry and Machine Gun Command Course. As a cadet, he fought in the suppression of the Tambov Rebellion between May and November of that year.

== Interwar period ==
After graduating from the course in September 1922, Nikitchenko was appointed to the 143rd Rifle Regiment of the 48th Rifle Division of the Moscow Military District at Rybinsk, where he served as an assistant platoon commander, platoon commander, and assistant company commander. Completing the commanders' refresher course at the Ashenbrenner Moscow Infantry School between November 1924 and July 1925, he returned to the regiment to serve as a company commander and chief of the regimental school. In October 1930 he transferred to the VTsIK Combined Military School in Moscow, where he served as a tactics instructor and chief of a cadet battalion. At the same time he completed two night courses at the Frunze Military Academy. In late 1934 Nikitchenko was transferred to the 250th Rifle Regiment of the 84th Rifle Division of the Moscow Military District, ending his studies at the academy due to the transfer to a different garrison.

In August 1936 he was appointed chief of the 3rd section of the 6th department of the district staff. From November of that year he commanded a cadet battalion at the VTsIK Combined Military School, then from August 1937 was a tactics instructor at the Ivanovo Reserve Officers Improvement Course (KUKS). He commanded kursant battalions at the Kharkov Military School for Red Commanders and the Ordzhonikidze Red Banner Military School from April and November 1938, respectively. From July 1939 he served as assistant chief for training and personnel of the Odessa Infantry School, and from July 1940 was chief of the Kamyshlov Infantry School.

== World War II ==
After Operation Barbarossa began, then-Colonel Nikitchenko oversaw the formation of the Ufa Infantry School from July 1941, organizing the training process and preparing command personnel for the frontline. From March 1942 he commanded the 210th Cadet Rifle Brigade, formed from military schools in Bashkiria. On 15 August of that year, Nikitchenko took command of the 226th Rifle Division, arriving at Buguruslan for rebuilding. In late September the division was sent to fight in the Battle of Stalingrad and on 18 October 1942 joined the 66th Army of the Don Front. From 24 October to 2 February 1943 the 226th fought in offensive operations to destroy the German forces at Stalingrad. In January and early February 1943, in Operation Koltso, the division under his command, overcoming stubborn Axis resistance, assault-crossed the Mokraya Mechetka and on 2 February captured the ruins of the Stalingrad Tractor Factory. For this action the division was converted into the 95th Guards Rifle Division on 4 May and Nikitchenko awarded the Order of the Red Banner on 14 February. He was promoted to the rank of major general on 1 March.

After the end of the Battle of Stalingrad, the division was withdrawn to the Reserve of the Supreme High Command before joining the 5th Guards Army. Nikitchenko was hospitalized on 29 June and handed over command of the 95th Guards to division deputy commander Colonel Andrey Lyakhov. After Nikitchenko returned to command the division in September, he led it in the attacks towards Poltava and Kremenchug. Crossing the Vorskla on 22 September, the division captured Poltava on the next day. For distinguishing itself in the capture of Poltava, the division received the name of the city as an honorific. Continuing the offensive, elements of the division captured Kremenchug on 29 September. In late September and early October during the Battle of the Dnieper the division fought in heavy offensive battles in the Pyatikhatka sector, covering the right flank of the breakthrough of the 5th Guards Tank Army, then attacked towards Aleksandriya, ensuring the junction of the 5th Guards and 57th Armies.

In November Nikitchenko fell ill and was evacuated to Moscow for treatment, then in late January 1944 appointed chief of the 5th department of the Higher Educational Institutions Directorate of the Main Personnel Directorate and deputy chief of the directorate supervising Suvorov Military Schools.

== Postwar ==
Postwar, Nikitchenko in April 1946 was appointed chief of the 3rd department of the Higher Educational Institutions Directorate of the Ground Forces as a result of the abolition of the post of deputy chief of the Higher Educational Institutions Directorate. From April 1948 he served as chief of the 4th department of the directorate before transferring to serve in the same position in the 3rd department in July 1949. From January 1950 to August 1951, Nikitchenko was at the disposal of the Main Personnel Directorate due to illness, then was appointed chief of a course of the correspondence department of the Frunze Military Academy. Retiring in October 1952, Nikitchenko died in Moscow on 1 April 1975.

== Awards ==
Nikitchenko was a recipient of the following decorations:

- Order of Lenin
- Order of the Red Banner (4)
- Order of Kutuzov, 2nd class
- Medals
- Foreign orders

In May 2023 Poltava renamed a street in honor of Nikitchenko to Dzhokhar Dudayev Street as part of the Ukrainian derussification campaign.
