= Sazhnoye =

Sazhnoye Сажное
- Selo
- Location within Belgorod Oblast Location within Russia
- Coordinates: 50°47′56″N 36°42′08″E
- Country: Russia
- Region: Belgorod Oblast
- District: Yakovlevsky District
- Time zone: UTC+3:00

Sazhnoye (Russian: Сажное) is a rural locality (a selo) and the administrative center of Sazhenskoye Rural Settlement, Yakovlevsky District, Belgorod Oblast, Russia. The population was 241 as of 2010. There are 7 streets.

== Geography ==
Sazhnoye is located 22 km east of Stroitel (the district's administrative centre) by road. Krivtsovo is the nearest rural locality.
