= 95th Guards Rifle Division =

- Active: 1943–1955
- Country: Soviet Union
- Branch: Red Army (1943–46); Soviet Army (1946–55)
- Type: Division
- Role: Infantry
- Engagements: Battle of Kursk; Battle of Prokhorovka; Belgorod–Kharkov Offensive Operation; Poltava-Kremenchug Offensive; Battle of the Dniepr; Kremenchug-Pyatikhatki Offensive; Kirovograd offensive Uman–Botoșani Offensive; First Jassy–Kishinev offensive Lvov–Sandomierz offensive Vistula-Oder Offensive; Lower Silesian Offensive; Upper Silesian Offensive; Battle of Berlin; Battle of the Oder–Neisse; Spremberg–Torgau Offensive Operation; Battle of Bautzen (1945); Prague Operation
- Decorations: Order of Lenin; Order of the Red Banner; Order of Suvorov; Order of Bogdan Khmelnitsky
- Battle honours: Poltava

Commanders
- Notable commanders: Maj. Gen. Nikolai Stepanovich Nikitchenko; Col. Andrei Nikitovich Lyakhov; Maj. Gen. Andrei Ivanovich Oleinikov

The 95th Guards Rifle Division was reformed as an elite infantry division of the Red Army in May 1943, based on the 1st formation of the 226th Rifle Division, and served in that role until well after the end of the Great Patriotic War. It ended the war on the approaches to Prague and continued to serve well into the postwar era in the Central Group of Forces.

The 226th had distinguished itself in the Battle of Stalingrad and following the German surrender there it was moved north to the central part of the front. At about the same time its Army was redesignated 5th Guards Army it was itself redesignated as the 95th Guards; it would soon be assigned to the 33rd Guards Rifle Corps and it would remain under this Army for the duration of the war. At the beginning of July 1943 it was in Steppe Front and in the latter part of the Battle of Kursk it was brought forward to help defend the Red Army's positions around Prokhorovka. Shortly after it joined the summer offensive through eastern Ukraine where it won a battle honor. In August it was first assigned to the 32nd Guards Rifle Corps and would serve under this distinguished command for most of the rest of the war. During the battles along the Dniepr River and west bank Ukraine the 95th Guards distinguished itself sufficiently to be awarded both the Order of the Red Banner and the Order of Bogdan Khmelnitsky. In the early summer of 1944 it was transferred with its Army to the 1st Ukrainian Front where it remained for the duration. It played a limited role in the Lvov–Sandomierz offensive but a significantly larger one in the Vistula-Oder offensive and the advance through southern Poland and into Silesia, during which it won the Order of Lenin and its subunits received several honorifics and decorations. In the final offensive south of Berlin the 95th Guards fought across the Neisse River before driving west toward Dresden. Along with its Front it then advanced south toward Prague in the final days before the fighting ended. With its distinguished record of service the division was retained into postwar service, finally being disbanded in September 1955.

== Formation ==
In April the 226th was still in 66th Army in the Reserve of the Supreme High Command. In the first days of May that Army was redesignated as the 5th Guards Army and on May 4 the division officially became the 95th Guards; it would receive its Guards banner on May 11. Once the division completed its reorganization its order of battle was as follows:

- 284th Guards Rifle Regiment (from 985th Rifle Regiment)
- 287th Guards Rifle Regiment (from 987th Rifle Regiment)
- 290th Guards Rifle Regiment (from 989th Rifle Regiment)
- 233rd Guards Artillery Regiment (from 875th Artillery Regiment)
- 103rd Guards Antitank Battalion
- 99th Guards Reconnaissance Company
- 109th Guards Sapper Battalion
- 140th Guards Signal Battalion (later 19th Guards Signal Company)
- 104th Guards Medical/Sanitation Battalion
- 100th Guards Chemical Defense (Anti-gas) Company
- 102nd Guards Motor Transport Company
- 96th Guards Field Bakery
- 97th Guards Divisional Veterinary Hospital
- 986th Field Postal Station
- 833rd Field Office of the State Bank

The division remained under the command of Maj. Gen. Nikolai Stepanovich Nikitchenko who had led the 226th since August 15, 1942. On June 29 he left command and was replaced by his deputy commander Col. Andrei Nikitovich Lyakhov. As of the beginning of June 5 Guards Army was still in the Steppe Military District of the Reserve of the Supreme High Command and the division had been assigned to 33rd Guards Rifle Corps. It was still there as the German summer offensive began.

== Battle of Kursk ==
The Steppe Military District was activated as Steppe Front on July 9, four days after the start of the battle. At this time the 33rd Guards Corps consisted of the 95th Guards, 97th Guards and 9th Guards Airborne Rifle Divisions. On this date the 95th Guards was recorded as having the following personnel and equipment: 862 officers; 2,433 NCOs; 5,476 other ranks; 4,720 rifles and carbines; 2,644 sub-machine guns; 489 light machine guns; 165 heavy machine guns, 218 antitank rifles; 96 artillery pieces of all calibres; 170 mortars of all calibres; 188 motor vehicles; seven tractors; 28 tow vehicles; and 923 horses. This was roughly average for the rifle divisions of 5th Guards Army. A detailed breakdown of the 287th Guards Rifle Regiment (Lt. Col. V. I. Solovev) from June 24 shows 1,896 personnel of an authorized 2,244. They were armed with: 1,057 Mosin-Nagants, of which 84 were carbines and 56 sniper rifles; 251 SVT-40s; 260 PPSh-41 SMGs; 163 DP-28 LMGs; 53 M1910 HMGs; two DShK-39 HMGs; 52 antitank rifles; 12 45mm antitank guns; four 76mm regimental guns; 18 50mm mortars; 26 82mm mortars; and eight 120mm mortars. This Regiment had the 109th Separate Penal Rifle Company attached to it, consisting of 247 personnel with similar percentages of small arms but no crew-served weapons.

=== Battle of Prokhorovka ===
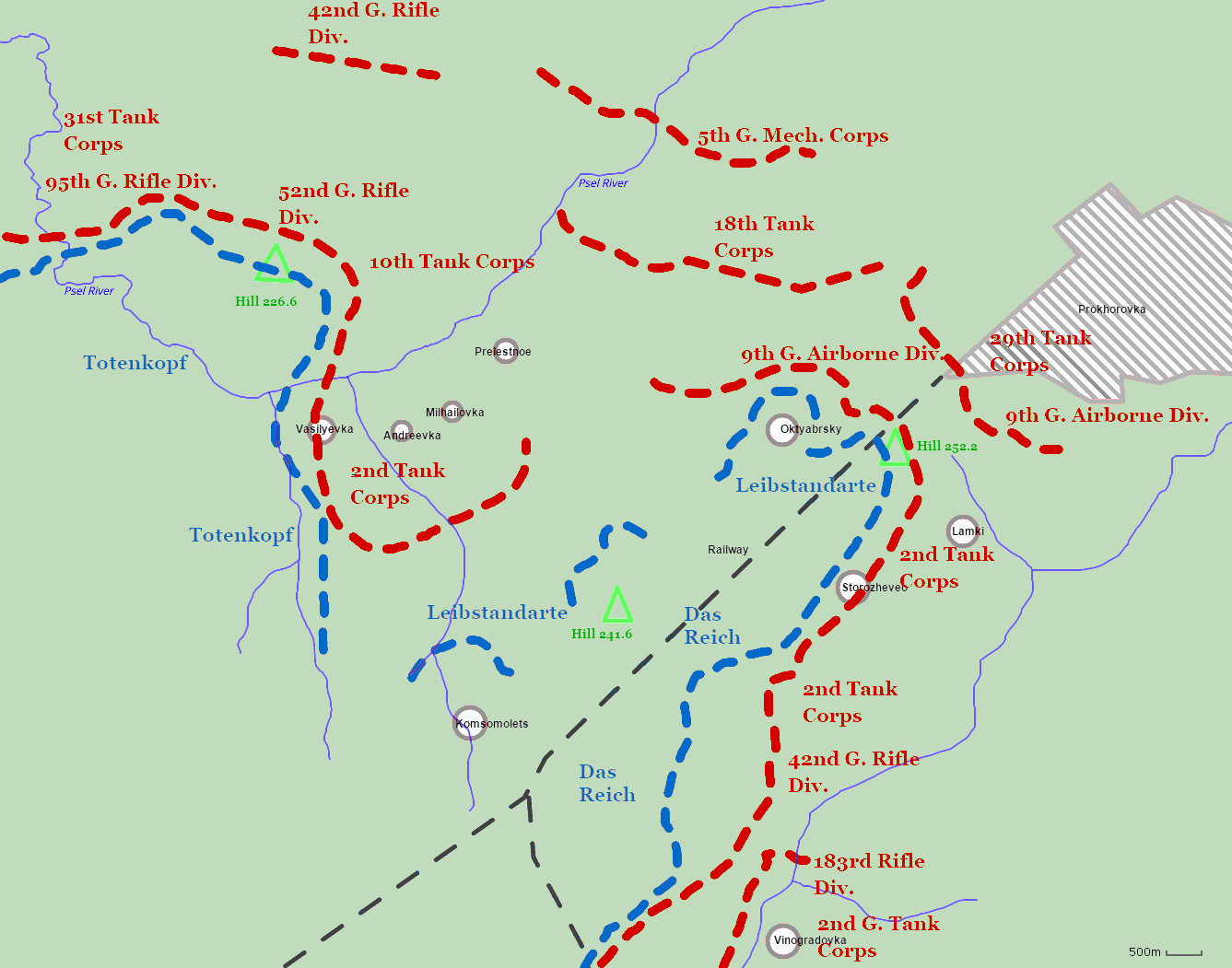
Battle of Prokhorovka, night of July 11. Note position shown of the 95th Guards does not include the 287th Guards Rifle Regiment east of the Psyol.

By July 10 it was clear to both sides that the German plan for Operation Zitadelle had largely failed; the attack by 9th Army on the north flank of the salient had stalled after minor gains. The 4th Panzer Army in the south, and especially the II SS Panzer Corps, was still capable of attacking and had reached to within striking distance of Prokhorovka. The commander of Voronezh Front, Army Gen. N. F. Vatutin, was determined to shut this down with a counterattack by the newly arrived forces of Steppe Front. By 0400 hours on July 11 units of the 95th Guards had reached the sector held by the 52nd Guards Rifle Division and had begun occupying jump-off positions for this attack. However, during the approach march the situation had changed, largely due to the 3rd SS Panzergrenadier Division Totenkopf having seized a bridgehead over the Psyol River near Klyuchi from the 52nd Guards late on the 10th, and plans for a counterattack were postponed. Instead the 95th Guards and 9th Guards Airborne dug in along what had been their start lines to form a second defensive line within the bend of the Psyol and in front of Prokhorovka. During the upcoming fighting the 287th Guards Regiment and 109th Penal Company would operate in partial isolation from the division's main forces, being dug in south of the Psyol and forming a link with the 9th Guards Airborne closer to Prokhorovka. The two divisions were to play a most important role on July 11 and 12 in keeping possession of Prokhorovka Station.

When the battle resumed on the morning of July 11 the 2nd Battalion of the 287th Guards Regiment was the 95th Guards' leftmost unit, tied in with the 3rd Battalion of the 9th Guards Airborne's 26th Guards Airborne Regiment on the sector from Vasilevka to Storozhevoe; they were supported by elements of the 2nd Tank Corps including the 26th Tank Brigade but this unit had been reduced to just three T-34s and nine T-70s with four attached Churchill tanks. Unknown to these Soviet forces the commander of the II SS Panzer Corps, Ogruf. P. Hausser, had decided to attack precisely on this sector with his 1st SS Panzergrenadier Division Leibstandarte SS Adolf Hitler. Hausser delayed attacking with his 3rd SS because the heavy resistance that division had encountered the previous day from the 52nd Guards convinced him that tank support was required north of the Psyol and bridging had been delayed by poor road conditions and concentrated Soviet artillery fire.

At 0630 hours the commander of the 1st SS Panzergrenadier Regiment was ordered to advance north toward Luchki before attacking through the woods north of Storozhevoe. About 15 minutes later the 1st SS Division's reconnaissance battalion was directed to cover the division's left flank and the 2nd SS Panzergrenadier Regiment. Before these moves began the Soviet positions were intensively worked over by artillery and air bombardment from 0730 and 0900 hours. By 1030 lead elements of the latter regiment had seized part of an antitank ditch and began to assault toward Hill 252.2 supported by further air attacks on that point as well as the nearby Oktiabrskii State Farm. This first attack gained from 1.5–2 km before being halted. A renewed effort began at 1300 which included extensive use of field artillery firing over open sights. About 30 minutes later the tank and armored infantry battlegroup led by Stubaf. J. Peiper reached the crest of Hill 252.2 along the railroad embankment, then pivoted north and attacked the Oktiabrskii. Almost simultaneously the 2nd Battalion of the 287th Guards Regiment buckled under the attack of the 1st SS's reconnaissance battalion.

Because of the inept leadership of this rifle battalion's commander, it began a disorderly retreat to the village of Prelestnoe, opening a path to the swampy basin of the [Psyol] around the villages of Prelestnoe and Petrovka. Panzergrenadiers of the reconnaissance battalion and Tigers of the 13th Company advanced through the crumpled right flank of the disintegrating 2nd Battalion in the direction of the Oktiabrskii State Farm and the two villages beyond it. The boundary between the 287th Guards Rifle Regiment and the 26th Guards Airborne Regiment disappeared into a quickly expanding gap...

While the commander of the 287th Guards Regiment had planned a defense in two echelons with the 1st Battalion together with batteries of 45mm and 76mm guns backing up the boundary between the 2nd and 3rd Battalions, the late arrival of the latter forced a change in these dispositions. Furthermore, as Lt. Colonel Solovev later reported to Colonel Lyakhov, the commander of the 3rd Battalion, Sen. Lt. Polunsky, failed to deploy on his assigned line and attempted to lead his men from a dugout more than 2 km to the rear. Polunsky would be removed from his command on July 19. This breakthrough was also facilitated by a number of mistakes made by the commander of the 9th Guards Airborne in setting up his antitank defenses. The State Farm would change hands several times during the fighting. Its defense was based on the 3rd Battalion of the 26th Guards Airborne Regiment backed in part by the 1st Battalion (Maj. Bugaev) of the 233rd Guards Artillery Regiment, which had been brought up to localize the breakthrough.

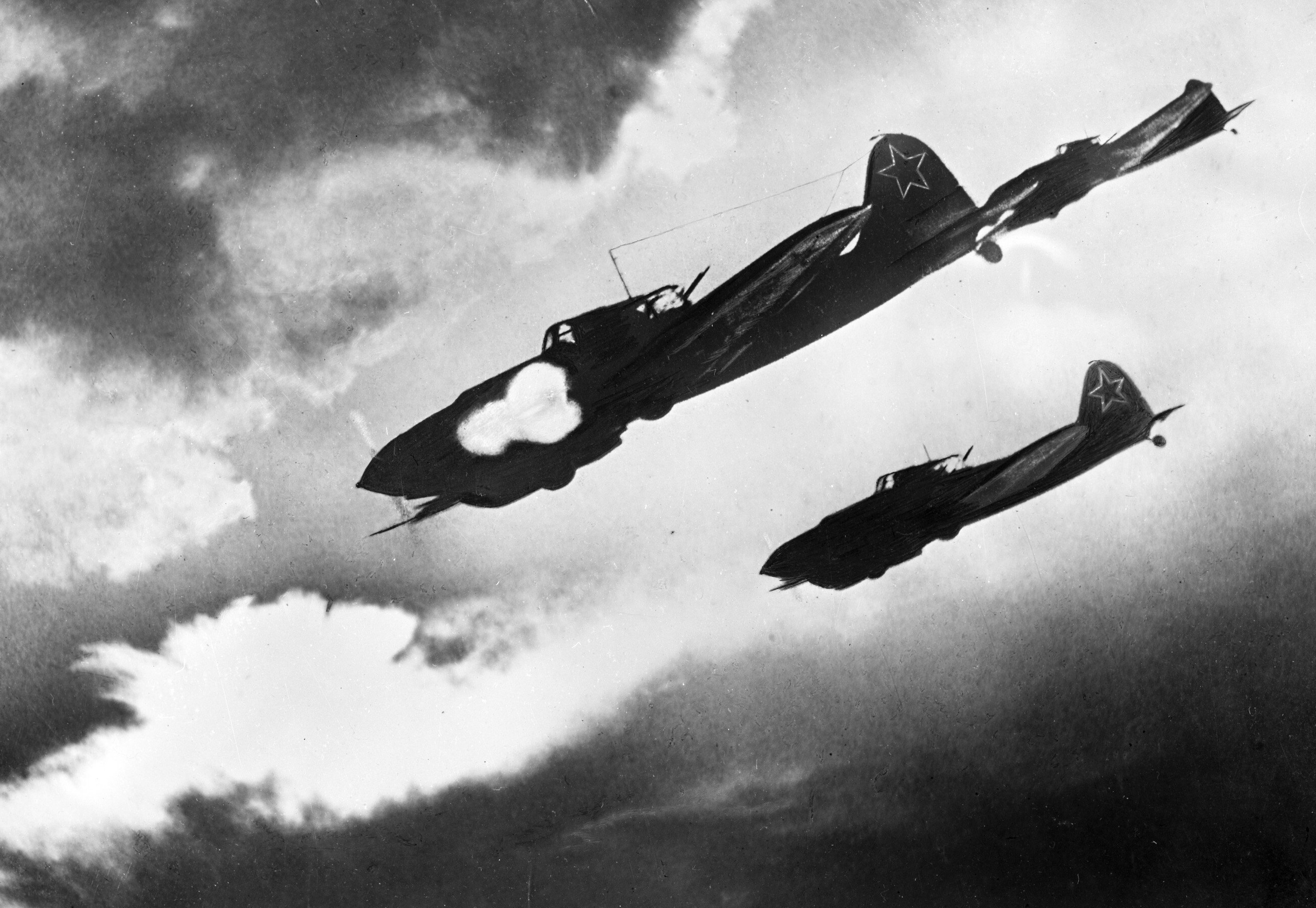
VVS Il-2 ground attack aircraft during the battle of Kursk.

By 1830 hours elements of the 1st SS had reached a line running from the western portion of Storozhevoe and the woods north of it to a point along the rail line about 500 metres northwest of Hill 252.2 over to the eastern outskirts of the Oktiabrskii State Farm. The division reported that it had been halted by the lagging behind of its corps-mates, the 3rd SS and 2nd SS Panzergrenadier Division Das Reich. In addition an attack by a large group of Il-2 aircraft near the sector held by the 1st Battalion of the 287th Guards Regiment knocked out some 20 armored vehicles late in the day and forced the remainder back to the State Farm. However, the failures of the 2nd and 3rd Battalions, allowing the 1st SS to advance to Petrovka, also led to the encirclement of the 99th Tank Brigade in Andreevka where it remained isolated until the morning.

==== The Fighting on July 12 ====
General Vatutin was still determined to counterattack the SS divisions on July 12, especially as the 5th Guards Tank Army was now arriving from Steppe Front. As that Army's 2nd Guards Tank Corps approached Colonel Lyakhov reacted as the situation dictated. Two batteries of the 103rd Destroyer Antitank Artillery Regiment were shifted to Hill 252.4 from beyond the Psyol and in order to block any German attempts to force a crossing at Petrovka the 5th Battery of the 233rd Guards Artillery's 2nd Battalion deployed southeast of that village, joined by the 3rd Battalion of the 284th Guards Rifle Regiment. Lyakhov's reserve, a company of submachine gunners, was moved up to the 287th Guards Regiment's sector north of the Oktiabrskii State Farm; he also sent the chief of staff of the division's artillery, Maj. F. I. Terekhov, to centralize artillery direction on this sector. Terekhov's leadership of concentrated fire on German armor forced their abandonment of Petrovka and a temporary withdrawal from the State Farm as well. Shortly before, at around 1730 hours a company of the 3rd SS with 12 tanks had tried to force a crossing of the Psyol at Krasnyi Oktiabr as a diversion, but this was beaten back by a counterattack from the 290th Guards Rifle Regiment.

At 2000 hours the commander of the 33rd Guards Corps, Maj. Gen. I. I. Popov, reported to the 5th Guards Army commander, Lt. Gen. A. S. Zhadov:

I have instructed the commander of the 95th Guards Rifle Division Colonel Lyakhov and the commander of the 9th Guards Airborne Division Colonel Sazanov to drive the enemy out of their occupied positions with a night attack and to restore the situation.

The fighting resumed before dawn and continued until about 0600 hours but yielded no real results. The SS troops had already dug in with powerful antitank and self-propelled gun support. However, the noise of battle helped to cover the approaches of the 5th Guards Tank Army and the 42nd Guards Rifle Division. For July 12 Vatutin had to simultaneously prepare a counterattack while also directing a defense, holding the line intended for the introduction of the strategic reserves into the engagement. He initially proposed to launch the tank attack through the positions of the 95th Guards in the bend of the Psyol, but rejected this due to the steep river banks, swampy bottom lands made worse by recent rains, and a lack of sufficient crossing points. (These same factors had been hindering the 3rd SS Division's attack the previous day.) The final combat order for 5th Guards Army was signed by General Zhadov at 0115 hours:

...2. The 33rd Guards Rifle Corps, exploiting the [5th Guards Tank Army's] attack, is to destroy the opposing enemy with a decisive offensive in the general direction of Bolshie Maiachki in conjunction with the 32nd Guards Rifle Corps and the tanks. The corps main blow will be inflicted with the forces of 97th Guards, 95th Guards and 42nd Guards Rifle Divisions, and the 9th Guards Airborne Division and 52nd Guards Rifle Division arranged in one echelon, having its greatest strength on its left flank.

Meanwhile, the 3rd SS Division was ordered to attack from its bridgehead at dawn to reach the Prokhorovka–Kartasheva road and secure the left flank of the 1st SS. Around 0800 hours the 287th Guards Regiment was withdrawn from its previous positions near Oktiabrskii State Farm to become Colonel Lyakhov's new reserve in the area of Veselyi.

When by noon it was clear that the main German group of forces had not been able to break through to the Prokhorovka area around the railroad and paved road Hausser decided to assist it with a renewed thrust by 3rd SS to turn the right flank of 5th Guards Tank Army and reach the area north of Prokhorovka in that Army's rear. For this purpose a group consisting of 100 tanks, a regiment of motorized infantry and 200 motorcyclists was concentrated in the Krasnyi Oktyabr–Kozlovka area. This group, supported by aviation, broke through the 52nd Guards' defense and by 1300 hours had captured Hill 226.6. On this height's northern slopes the 3rd SS encountered stubborn resistance from the 284th and 290th Guards Rifle Regiments in prepared defenses. Despite repeated attempts to break through the German force was beaten off with fire and counterattacks until 1800 hours when they halted to bring up fresh reserves. The attack resumed at 2000 following a massed air raid. By nightfall units of the division had been pushed back, the 3rd SS had reached Hill 236.7 and captured the village of Polezhaev with part of its forces, but was unable to advance farther.

During the course of the day the 290th Guards Regiment was threatened with encirclement near Veselyi by a company of submachine gunners backed by 18 tanks but these were driven off with losses in part by the fire of the 52nd Guards' 124th Guards Artillery Regiment. The performance of the 290th Guards Regiment was hampered by its commander's dereliction of duty. Lyakhov later accused:

On 12 July... Zaiarny, Fyodor Mikhailovich, removed himself from command of his regiment, driving off to the second echelon feigning illness. When the divisional command post demanded to know where he was and where his units were located, he gave an incorrect location...

The Soviet position at Hill 236.7 was doubly important as the command post of the 233rd Guards Artillery Regiment and the observation point of General Zhadov. After the war Zhadov recalled that he had ordered the Regiment's commander, Maj. A. P. Revin, to destroy the oncoming German tanks. In the ensuing fighting Revin personally took up a gun position due to crew losses and set fire to a German tank. Later in the day Revin was mortally wounded while attempting to withdraw from the command post.

The position of the 284th Guards Regiment (Lt. Col. V. S. Nakaidze) during the day was also difficult, as it was on the main attack axis of the 3rd SS division's armored battlegroup. After the fall of Hill 226.6 the Regiment's continuous line of defense broke into scattered pockets of resistance; separate platoons, companies and even elements of other regiments quickly took position on the first pieces of ground suitable for resistance they could find. Gaps existed between these hastily organized strongpoints where artillery batteries and battalions deployed to offer direct fire support, particularly against tanks. Due to the lack of infantry cover these artillery positions were infiltrated and came under fire of German infantry on several occasions, as well as tank attacks. During one of the latter the commander of an antitank rifle platoon of the 284th Guards Regiment, Sen. Lt. Pavel Ivanovich Shpetny, distinguished himself. The platoon was defending one of the low hills southwest of Polezhaev and managed to knock out up to six German vehicles, but the fight was unequal in part due to ammunition shortages affecting the entire division. Bleeding from several wounds, Shpetny threw himself under a tank with a grenade bundle in his hands, destroying it at the cost of his own life, and the German attack faltered. On January 10, 1944, Shpetny would be posthumously made a Hero of the Soviet Union.

As the fighting reached its climax at 1600 hours General Popov wrote an order to the divisions of his Corps which read in part:

In order to destroy the enemy tanks, operating in the region (excl.) Veselyi–Polezhaev–Hill 226.6–Kliuchi, I order... 3. For the commanders of the 52nd and 95th Guards Rifle Division immediately to bring up guns as closely as possible to the enemy for the destruction of enemy tanks in the [above] area. [This is] to be ready by 1800 today. 4. Open general fire on the enemy tanks at 1810 today at the signal - a series of red flares, launched by the 95th Guards Rifle Division's commander from Hill 236.7.

Already by 1730, according to Colonel Lyakhov, the German advance in the direction of the Prokhorovka–Kartashevka road had been halted. For all practical purposes this was the turning point on the 5th Guards Army's sector. Although after 1800 the 3rd SS undertook a few more attacks the situation had stabilized. After several hours of firing over open sights the 233rd Guards Artillery, in addition to Major Revin, had a deputy battalion commander, a battery commander, and an unknown number of junior commanders and other ranks killed; 24 men wounded and 33 men missing in action. Equipment losses included five ZIS-3 guns, three radios, two tractors with trailers and four trucks. Among the rifle regiments the day's losses were heaviest in the 284th Guards; the total killed were 137 in the 1st Battalion, 51 in the 2nd Battalion and eight in the 3rd. On the other hand, the 3rd SS, which had started the day with 101 armored vehicles, including 10 Tigers and 21 assault guns, lost 46 knocked out by the forces of 5th Guards Army, although almost all of the Tigers were recovered and returned to service within days.

==== Battle for Hill 226.6 ====
Vatutin was still determined to drive back the German penetration of his Front, unaware that Hitler had effectively ended the offensive on the evening of July 12. He made it the main task of his Armies for July 13 to block any further advance on Prokhorovka while also preventing any regrouping of the II SS Corps. The 95th, 42nd and part of the 52nd Guards Rifle Divisions, together with two brigades of the 5th Guards Mechanized Corps, were directed to liquidate the entire German grouping on the north bank of the Pysol, which was clearly beyond their capabilities. The 95th Guards was partially scattered and during the early morning higher headquarters could not establish exactly where Lyakhov and his headquarters were located.

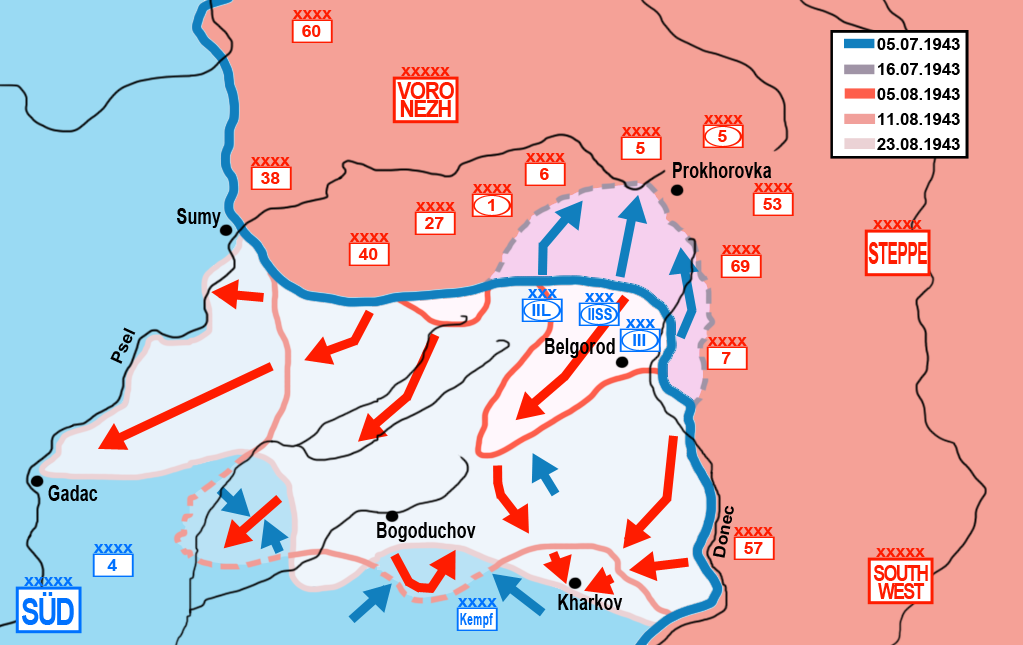
4th Panzer Army's penetration and the following Operation Polkhovodets Rumyantsev. Note the 5th Guards Army is shown as 5th Army.

The intelligence section of 5th Guards Army overnight had detected the evacuation of the bulk of 3rd SS's panzer regiment from the Psyol bridgehead; these tanks were going to reinforce the 2nd SS Division prior to the start of Operation Roland. Lyakhov was ordered to retake Hill 226.6 with the support of the 24th Guards Tank Brigade, the 51st Guards Tank Regiment and the 1446th Self-Propelled Artillery Regiment (mixed SU-122s and SU-76s), with additional fire support from the 18th Tank Corps south of the river. The offensive was delayed until 1100 hours due to a lack of artillery ammunition and made only slow progress. With its armor support the division reached the hill by mid-day. According to the divisional war diary:

... units of the division, running into stubborn resistance and enemy counterattacks, continued to attack in the direction: 287th Guards Rifle Regiment - Kliuchi and the woods east of Kliuchi; 284th Guards Rifle Regiment - Hill 226.6; 290th Guards Rifle Regiment - echeloned behind the 287th Guards Rifle Regiment with the support of 50 tanks of the 24th Tank Brigade and the 469th Mortar Regiment. Between 1010 and 1115, our infantry with the attached support engaged in a heavy exchange of fire with enemy infantry and tanks, and as a result threw the enemy off of Hill 226.6, having occupied the enemy's first line of trenches. At 1118, 26 heavy enemy tanks emerged from the southeastern slopes of Hill 226.6 and 33 heavy tanks from the southwestern slopes, which outflanked our combat positions and outflanked the infantry... from the supporting tanks. A fierce tank battle erupted, as a result of which our artillery knocked out 3 heavy and 4 medium enemy tanks and wiped out 80 Hitlerites... Between 1230 to 1500, the bitterest - on our part defensive - fighting took place. By 1500 under the pressure of superior enemy forces, the units of the division made a fighting withdrawal to a new line and occupied a position: the 290th Guards Rifle Regiment - south and southeast of Veselyi; the 287th Guards Rifle Regiment - northwest slopes of Hill 226.6 to the junction of farm roads 1 kilometre north of Hill 226.6; 284th Guards Rifle Regiment - from the junction of farm roads... to the northern branch of the gully lying 2 kilometers northeast of Hill 226.6.

This diarist claimed eight German tanks knocked out and more than a company of infantry destroyed during the day. A dispatch from 33rd Guards Corps at 2200 stated that the "33 heavy tanks" encountered were Tigers, but this is not credible.

During the evening the 24th Guards Tanks and the 1446th SU Regiment were withdrawn from the bend of the Psyol, depriving the division of its armor support. For July 14 it counted only 119 shells for its 122mm howitzers and less than half a daily combat load of ammunition for its 76mm guns and 120mm mortars. Despite this its rifle battalions continued to assault Hill 226.6 for four more days, until July 17, with only the addition of the 108th Separate Penal Company. The German defense was estimated as a company-sized strongpoint equipped with 12-15 heavy machine guns with the support of two mortar batteries and a battalion of artillery. A Corps operational summary at 2400 hours on July 16 stated that forward groups of the division had advanced 200m-400m in nighttime operations before digging in, but without tank support were forced to withdraw due to counterattacks. From July 9–12 the 95th Guards lost 356 men, including 91 killed or mortally wounded; by comparison from July 13–17 it suffered an additional 3,164 casualties, of which 952 were fatalities.

The 4th Panzer Army was left holding a salient up to 90 km deep but only up to 35 km wide which was vulnerable to being cut off by Soviet forces at its base. On July 16 the decision was taken to withdraw to the lines held prior to the offensive and that evening rear elements began to pull back to Belgorod. 5th Guards Army attempted to pursue but faced stiff resistance and even counterattacks from German rearguards. By the end of July 23 Voronezh Front was back on the lines it had held on July 5. As of August 1 the Army was assigned to this Front and the 33rd Guards Corps contained the 42nd and 95th Guards and the 9th Guards Airborne Divisions.

== Into Ukraine ==
Planning for the counteroffensive, Operation Polkhovodets Rumyantsev, began almost immediately. Due to other Soviet offensives that had begun in July the II SS Panzer Corps had been transferred to the Donbass while the Panzergrenadier Division Großdeutschland had moved to the Oryol area. According to this plan the left wing of Voronezh Front, consisting of the 5th Guards, 5th Guards Tank and 1st Tank Armies, was to break through the German front along the 14 km-wide sector from Trirechnoe to outside Glushinskii and then develop the attack with mobile formations in the general direction of Zolochiv and Valky, outflanking Kharkiv from the west. The attack was to begin on August 3 and the 5th Guards Army was supported by the 28th and 57th Guards Heavy Tank Regiments (KV-1 tanks), the 13th Artillery Division and several additional artillery and mortar units. The 95th Guards was in the first echelon with the 9th Guards Airborne in second and the 42nd Guards acting as Zhadov's reserve. 1st Tank Army was to enter the breach created by 5th Guards.

The artillery preparation began at 0500 hours with a surprise 5-minute onslaught against the forward edge of the German defense, followed by a 30-minute pause then an hour of controlled registration before a methodical bombardment of key targets which lasted until 0750. By 0815 the infantry and heavy tanks broke into the first line of trenches behind a rolling barrage. By midday the forward elements of 5th Guards Army had generally reached a line from Dragunskoe to Berezov at which point they were bypassed by the lead elements of the two tank armies. By the end of the day the 5th Guards had advanced from 8 km-12 km and the German 332nd and 167th Infantry Divisions had suffered heavy losses. By the end of August 5 the Army's forces had cleared the center of resistance at Tomarovka with 1st Tank Army and reached the line Striguny–Gomzino–Step. 5th Guards was now directed toward Murafa to help isolate the Germans' Kharkiv group of forces. In cooperation with 5th Guards Tanks it continued to attack to the south and by the end of August 8 reached a line from Bolshaya Rogozyanka to Mironovka. During August 10–11 the Army did not advance and instead beat back heavy counterattacks along a line from Mironovka to Gurinovka to Krysino. This largely defensive fighting continued until August 17. Following this a large German grouping was organized in the Okhtyrka area which attempted to reach Bogodukhov but this effort collapsed by the 20th and the former city was liberated on August 25. Meanwhile, Kharkiv was taken on August 23 and the offensive moved into its next phase.

=== Advance to the Dniepr ===
By the start of September the 95th Guards had been assigned to the 32nd Guards Rifle Corps, still in 5th Guards Army. (This Corps was commanded by Hero of the Soviet Union Maj. Gen. A. I. Rodimtsev, who had led the 13th Guards Rifle Division in the Battle of Stalingrad.) On September 8 Hitler finally authorized Army Group South's retreat to the Dniepr River, leading to a race between the two sides through eastern Ukraine. On September 20 General Nikitchenko returned to command of the division following the death of Colonel Lyakhov the previous day; three days later the division, which by now had returned to 33rd Guards Corps, was recognized with an honorific:

POLTAVA – ...95th Guards Rifle Division (Maj. Gen. Nikitchenko, Nikolai Stepanovich)... The troops that participated in the liberation of Poltava, by order of the Supreme Commander-in-Chief of 23 September 1943 and a commendation in Moscow, are given a salute of 12 artillery salvoes by 120 guns.

As the 5th Guards Army closed up to the river it was transferred to Steppe Front (as of October 20, 2nd Ukrainian Front).

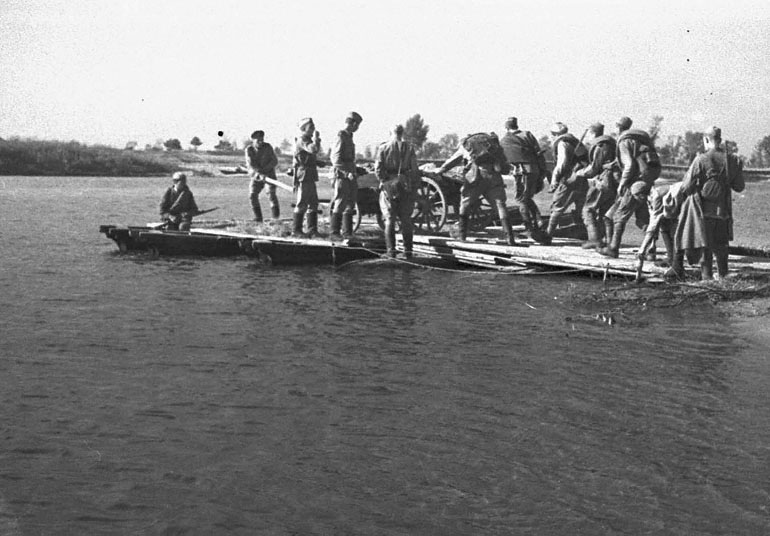
Soviet soldiers crossing the Dniepr on improvised rafts

On September 26 Steppe Front made three crossings between Kremenchuk and Dnepropetrovsk which were expanded over the next few days to form a single bridgehead 50 km wide and at one point 16 km deep. In the first weeks of October the Front commander, Army Gen. I. S. Konev, shifted 5th Guards Army from the bridgehead north of Kremenchuk to behind the bridgeheads south of the city. The Kremenchug-Pyatikhatki Offensive began on October 15 when a dozen rifle divisions attacked out of the larger of the bridgeheads and by the next day had three armies across the river, tearing open the left flank of 1st Panzer Army. On October 18 Piatykhatky was liberated, cutting the main railroads to Dnepropetrovsk and Kryvyi Rih, which was the obvious next objective. The lead elements of 2nd Ukrainian Front reached the outskirts of Kryvyi Rih but were counterattacked on the 27th by the XXXX Panzer Corps, driving them back some 32 km and doing considerable damage to the Red Army formations in the process. As of November 1 the 95th Guards was back in the 32nd Guards Corps. On November 5 Nikitchenko was evacuated to Moscow due to illness; he would remain in the educational establishments of the Red and Soviet Armies after his recovery until he retired in 1952. He was replaced in command by Col. Andrei Ivanovich Oleinikov, who would remain in this post for the duration of the war and would be promoted to the rank of major general on January 17, 1944.

=== Battles in the Dniepr Bend ===
On November 13 the 2nd Ukrainian Front gained several small bridgeheads on both sides of Cherkasy and quickly expanded the one north until it threatened to engulf the city and tear open the front of German 8th Army. Ten days later, with gaps in its front lines around the Cherkasy bridgehead and north of Kryvyi Rih, the chief of staff of that Army pleaded for permission to stage a general withdrawal but this was denied. During November and the first three weeks of December Konev was content to fight a battle of attrition with the 1st Panzer and 8th Armies which he could better afford, gradually clearing the right bank of the Dniepr north to Cherkasy. In recognition of its role in this fighting, on December 10 the 95th Guards was awarded the Order of the Red Banner. As of December 1 it had been serving as a separate division in 5th Guards Army, but as of the beginning of January it had returned to 32nd Guards Corps.

The Front was ordered over to the defensive on December 20 as replacements were absorbed by the fighting units and supplies were replenished. On January 5 it threw a powerful blow directly at the boundary between the 8th and 6th German Armies which broke through and swept northward, reaching nearly to Kirovograd in a matter of hours. The next day the attack swept north and south around the city, encircling the XXXXVII Panzer Corps, which was forced to break out and abandon the city on January 8. Appalling freeze-and-thaw weather brought the offensive to a premature end on the 16th. On January 24 a Front reconnaissance-in-force hit a nearly 20 km-wide stretch of 8th Army's line between Cherkasy and Kirovograd where there was no more than one infantryman for every 15 metres of front and penetrated deeply. This marked the start of the start of the encirclement battle of Korsun–Cherkassy which continued until February 16 but did not involve 5th Guards Army or the 95th Guards directly.

During the Kirovograd offensive on January 15, near the village of Gruzskoye Jr. Sgt. Bari Galeevich Gabdrakhmanov, a gunner of the 233rd Guards Artillery Regiment, was involved in repelling a German counterattack. As gun layer he knocked out a tank and two assault guns and destroyed two machine guns. The gun crew was eventually reduced to himself and a loader. After firing the last available round of ammunition he continued to engage with a machine gun until he was seriously wounded. Gabdrakhmanov died of his wounds on January 23 and was buried at Kirovograd. On September 13 he would be posthumously made a Hero of the Soviet Union.

=== Advance to the Dniestr and Jassy-Kishinev Offensive ===
Uman–Botoșani Offensive. Note location of 5th Guards Army.

The Soviet spring offensive in the south began on March 4. 5th Guards Army was still in the vicinity of Kirovograd near the left (south) flank of its Front. Marshal Konev's first target was the city of Uman, which was taken on March 9, but two days earlier a secondary thrust by his left flank armies again struck the 6th Army/8th Army boundary. Within days the German forces were in full retreat toward the Southern Bug River, but the advance did not end there. On March 17 Novoukrainka and the town of Pomichna were liberated and on March 29 the 95th Guards would be recognized for its part in these victories with the award of the Order of Bogdan Khmelnitsky, 2nd Degree. By the first days of April the 5th Guards Army was on the far left flank of its Front, closing on the Dniestr River against minimal opposition. It was tasked with reaching the Grigoriopol area and maintaining close contact with the right-flank armies of 3rd Ukrainian Front. The Army's official history states:

The 32nd Guards Rifle Corps was to force the Dnestr on a broad front by conducting its main attack toward Pugacheny on the right wing, exploit the attack toward Fintinitsy and Mereny, and capture the Chimisheny, Kobuska, Vechi, and Speia line by day's end on 13 April... The 7th Mechanized Corps had the mission of crossing its tanks over the Dniestr in the 32nd Guards Rifle Corps' sector and assisting it in capturing a bridgehead by attacking toward Chimisheny. Subsequently, it was to concentrate its tanks on the bank of the Dniestr and be prepared to launch a surprise attack to envelop the city of Kishinev.

When this order was received the Corps was facing defenses of the German 4th Mountain Division. Despite a significant advantage in manpower and armor the Army's advance developed at a slow pace. The 32nd and 33rd Guards Corps, advancing abreast, were still 20 km-30 km east of the river by the end of April 4; further progress was halted until April 10. At that point the disordered German and Romanian forces began their final pullback to the river, which 5th Guards Army reached early on April 12.

The Army immediately began crossing operations, mostly using improvised means. The 95th Guards was leading 32nd Guards Corps and reached the river near the city of Tașlîc. By now it was facing the 320th Infantry Division which was badly shaken after a harrowing withdrawal. The 290th Guards Rifle Regiment took up positions in a deep ravine containing a water-filled ditch adjacent to the riverbank which gave it cover to launch its boats and rafts before entering the main river channel at 2200 hours. By 0400 hours of April 13 the Regiment was completely across and had established a small bridgehead about 5 km south of Pugacheny. Despite German fire the rest of the leading elements of the division made it into the bridgehead during the morning. While these dug in Zhadov's rear services moved the regimental guns and mortars across along with the second echelon regiment and after dark a floating bridge was used to bring over the 233rd Guards Artillery. Meanwhile, the 97th Guards Division and the three divisions of 33rd Guards Corps were stymied in their crossing attempts further north. As a result, Rodimtsev ordered the 97th to enter the 95th's bridgehead later on the 13th, followed by the 13th Guards the following day. His entire Corps was across the Dniestr by 1700 on April 14.

The 97th Guards made repeated attacks to expand the bridgehead to the north and west and succeeded in capturing Pugacheny and the low hills nearby. Zhadov now ordered the entire 33rd Guards Corps to also enter the bridgehead, a movement that was completed by the end of April 16. Meanwhile, the 13th Guards took Speia and the lodgement was now over 10 km wide and up to 8 km deep. However, as yet the 5th Guards Army did not have a single tank in the bridgehead to help fend off the inevitable German counterattacks. Reserves were moving up in the form of the 294th Infantry and the 13th Panzer Divisions, arriving late on April 16, too late to eliminate the bridgehead but just in time to contest a major offensive by Zhadov's forces. Using N2P pontoon bridges he was able to get some of his armor into the bridgehead overnight on April 14/15 and by the 16th enough heavy weapons were across for this effort to proceed.

==== Battle for the Pugacheny Bridgehead ====
When the breakout attempt began the 32nd Guards Corps was deployed with the 95th Guards in the center, flanked by the 97th to the north and the 13th to the south. A composite tank brigade of the 7th Mechanized was in support. The attack began after dawn on April 16 following a two-hour preparation by the combined artillery of 5th Guards Army and bombardment by the 17th Air Army. After about two hours of fighting the forward security belt of the 320th Infantry was taken and the attack penetrated the first defensive position until by 0930 hours a hole up to 1.5 km wide and 3 km deep had been torn in the German defenses. The 95th Guards made significant gains about 7 km south of Delacău, reaching up to 2 km into the German second position.

Just as the advance was reaching the eastern ridgeline roughly 13 km west of the Dniestr at 1030 hours the German forces struck back with an intense artillery preparation and heavy air strikes against both the advancing tanks and infantry and their supporting artillery. The first wave of counterattacks stopped Zhadov's troops in their tracks and at 1500 fresh counterattacks struck them in the flanks before they could dig in. The 32nd Guards Corps largely faced the 13th Panzers from the high ground west of Speia. The fighting raged throughout the rest of the day; the 95th and 13th Guards suffered heavy casualties and were forced to pull back to avoid outright destruction. By nightfall three German battlegroups reached the two divisions' rear areas, temporarily encircling their divisional artillery regiments in their firing positions. Under cover of twilight and artillery fire the battered rifle regiments managed to occupy dug-in defensive positions around the guns and bring the onslaught to a halt. The fighting continued into the next day by which time both sides were thoroughly exhausted. As a result of this counterstroke the German XVII and LII Army Corps managed to reestablish a continuous defensive front hemming in the bridgehead.

Zhadov made two more attempts to break out to Chișinău, on April 18 and 25, but despite substantial reinforcements for the latter attempt, including the 78th Guards Rifle Division from 4th Guards Army, made very little progress. German 6th Army also attempted to liquidate the bridgehead but with no greater success. During the first days of May the STAVKA decided to remove the 5th Guards Army from the bridgehead and replace it with the more powerful 8th Guards Army from 3rd Ukrainian Front while the 5th Guards redeployed to the north and west to take part in a new drive on the city of Iași. The German command was aware of this planned handover, as its forces overlooked the entire bridgehead from high ground to the west, and planned to take advantage with a new attack by XXXX Panzer Corps. This was set to begin on May 10; the main part of the transfer was carried out on the night of May 9/10 and the 95th Guards' positions from southeast of Hill 172.4 to the low hill designated by Marker 164.5 were taken over by the 47th Guards Rifle Division early in the process and the 95th was clear of the bridgehead before the fighting started.

== Into Poland and Germany ==
The intended new offensive on Iași was stymied by further Axis counterattacks against 2nd Ukrainian Front, which went over to the defensive by early June. On June 25 the 95th Guards entered the Reserve of the Supreme High Command with its Corps and Army for rebuilding and eventual redeployment to 1st Ukrainian Front, where it remained for the duration of the war. This Front was taken over by Marshal Konev at about the same time. In July it was noted that the division's personnel were roughly 60 percent Ukrainian and 40 percent Russian by nationality.

The Front launched the Lvov–Sandomierz Offensive on July 13 but 5th Guards Army did not enter the operation until early August. By the end of August 3 it had concentrated in the Kolbuszowa region and was ordered to exploit the 3rd Guards Tank and 13th Armies' crossings over the Vistula in the Baranów Sandomierski area. 5th Guards Army was to develop the offensive along the Busko-Zdrój axis and General Zhadov directed the 32nd Guards Corps to make its attack toward that town on August 4 before crossing into the bridgehead southwest of Baranów. The Corps reached the Shidluv and Stopnitsa line by the end of August 6, and the 34th Guards Rifle Corps entered the existing bridgehead at about the same time. Intense fighting for the bridgehead went on for the rest of the month and on September 1 the 290th Guards Rifle Regiment was given the honorific "Vistula" while the 233rd Guards Artillery Regiment was awarded the Order of the Red Banner.

=== Vistula-Oder Offensive ===
These battles again depleted the strength of the division and in December it was reinforced with replacements of the 169th Separate Army Rifle Company. 1st Ukrainian Front launched its part of the Vistula-Oder Offensive on January 12, 1945. 5th Guards Army was assigned a 6 km-wide breakthrough front, with up to 282 guns and mortars and 23 tanks and self-propelled guns per kilometre. The 4th Guards and 31st Tank Corps were to be committed on the first day to complete the breach of the German main defensive zone. The breakthrough and exploitation went largely as planned and by January 22 the Front's main group of forces, which included the 5th Guards Army, was arriving along the Oder River along a broad front in the general area of Lissa, although the Army was lagging about 20 km behind, threatening the link between the main group and the left flank armies. In response the Army was redirected towards the Oder northwest of Oppeln and reached there by day's end and captured the city the next day in cooperation with the 3rd Guards Tank and 21st Armies. The 32nd Guards Corps, along with the 33rd and 34th, were deployed in a single echelon and by January 28 had seized three substantial bridgeheads over the river.

During this advance the division played a leading role in the liberation of Częstochowa on January 17. As a result, the 284th Guards Rifle Regiment (Lt. Col. Pronyaev, Vasilii Prokofevich) and the 233rd Guards Artillery Regiment (Lt. Col. Biletskii, Pavel Petrovich) were both awarded its name as an honorific. For its part in this victory, on February 19 the 290th Guards Rifle Regiment received the Order of the Red Banner. On the same date the 287th Guards Rifle Regiment was granted the honorific "Silesia" while the 284th Guards was decorated with the Red Banner for its part in crossing the Oder and capturing Milicz, Bernstadt, Namysłów and other towns, while the 95th Guards as a whole won the Order of Lenin for its role in the breakout from the Sandomierz bridgehead.

=== Lower Silesian Offensive ===
Beginning on February 8 the 5th Guards Army took part in the Front's Lower Silesian Offensive with its main objective of encircling the German garrison of Breslau. On its sector the offensive was based on the bridgehead seized by 14th Guards Rifle Division in January. The German defense was based on the 269th Infantry Division with several battlegroups, five independent battalions, two panzer battalions and an NCO school. The Army's attack was led by 32nd Guards Rifle Corps and developed slowly over the first three days in large part due to the large number of fortified villages to be overcome and the ammunition shortage faced by all Soviet forces after the breakneck advance through Poland. As early as the second day the Corps began facing heavy counterattacks from the "Kurt" divisional combat group which was attempting to reach Klein Peskerau; many villages changed hands several times. On February 11 Marshal Konev shifted the 31st Tank Corps from 21st Army and committed it on the sector of 33rd Guards Corps the next day with the immediate objective of capturing the Bogenau area.

On February 13 the Army's offensive developed more successfully than in the preceding days. German resistance did not abate and if anything increased as further forces entered the Breslau area but despite this the 4th Guards and 31st Tank Corps linked up with the 7th Guards Mechanized Corps of 6th Army to complete the encirclement. Overnight elements of the 32nd Guards Corps reached Rothsürben and occupied Gallen, linking up with 7th Guards Mechanized and cutting the last German-held road to Breslau. Konev chose to leave 6th Army to maintain the siege while the 32nd and 33rd Guards Corps were ordered to make a decisive attack from the Magnitz area toward Koberwitz and then to the southwest. During the fighting on February 15 the width of the cordon between Breslau and the main German forces was increased to up to 13 km. By the end of February 17 the 32nd Guards Corps had arrived in the Liegnitz area, relieving the 3rd Guards Tank Army's 9th Mechanized Corps which then undertook a forced night march which brought it to Bober River in the Lewenberg area.

=== Upper Silesian Offensive ===
1st Ukrainian Front's next operation began at 0600 hours on March 15 but 5th Guards Army played only a supporting role. The 34th Guards Corps was tasked with destroying the German forces in the Strelen area while Rodimtsev was ordered to attack on the morning of the second day with a reinforced regiment of the 97th Guards in its support. These forces deployed on a line from Strelen to Jauer. The German Oppeln grouping had been encircled and destroyed by the Front's forces by the end of March 20 despite the failure of 34th Guards and 4th Guards Tank Corps' failure to capture Strelen. Zhadov committed the 32nd Guards Corps on the morning of March 24 from its positions northwest of the town. The 95th and 97th Guards, reinforced by the 150th Tank Brigade and artillery, were to break through the German defenses on a sector from Point 168.8 to Plomuhle and take Strelen before developing the offensive in the direction of Pench and Wammelwitz. The supply of artillery ammunition, which had hampered the 34th Guards Corps, had improved and the attack would begin with an artillery preparation of one hour and fifteen minutes along with two fire onslaughts for a total of 15 minutes. Strelen was covered from the north and northwest by the Klein Loe Canal which would have to be forced by the 32nd Guards Corps; in addition, a large number of fortified strongpoints would have to be overcome by flexible maneuver tactics. The two divisions were deeply echeloned to maintain the momentum of the attack.

Following the artillery preparation the assault began at 1020 hours. The 95th and 97th Guards successfully forced the Klein Loe and by the end of the day had several of the powerful German strongpoints in hand, despite having to repel several counterattacks by up to a battalion of infantry and 10 tanks each. The crossings had been eased by the actions of the forward rifle companies which had been detached from each regiment in the Corps' first echelon. These pushed aside the combat security elements from the left bank of the canal with a decisive attack and soon captured the first trench line. During the next two days the 95th Guards attacked Strelen from the north while the 112th Rifle Division advanced from the west and southwest. By the evening of March 25 the division had seized the northern outskirts while the 112th was only able to blockade the town from the west. The next day the 95th Guards engaged in fierce street fighting with the garrison and completed its destruction on the morning of March 27, continuing on to capture several strongpoints to the south. Reinforcements from other sectors met with German remnants falling back to the south and by day's end had occupied a new line of resistance. At this point Konev ordered 5th Guards Army to halt and consolidate. In recognition of their parts in this difficult battle, on April 26 the 284th Guards Regiment would be awarded the Order of Kutuzov, 3rd Degree, while the 287th Guards Regiment received the Order of Aleksandr Nevsky.

=== Berlin Operation ===
By the start of the final offensive against the German capital the 32nd Guards Corps had lost the 112th Rifle Division and again consisted of the 13th, 95th and 97th Guards Divisions. 5th Guards Army was deployed along the east bank of the Neisse River on a 13 km front and planned to launch its main attack with its right wing on the 8 km sector from Gross Saerchen to Muskau. The 32nd and 34th Guards Corps were deployed in the first echelon while the 33rd Guards Corps was in second echelon, along with the 4th Guards Tank Corps. 32nd Corps had the 13th and 95th in its first echelon and the 97th in its second. At this time the division, in common with most of those in the Army, had a personnel strength of roughly 5,200 men.

When the offensive began on April 16 the Army's main forces crossed the Neisse under the cover of massed artillery fire. By the end of the day the 95th and 13th Guards, operating with 4th Guards Tanks, had broken through the main defensive zone and, after advancing 8 km, reached the "Matilda" defensive zone and was fighting along a line between Dubrutzke and Tschernitz. The next day the German command committed the Panzer-Führerbegleitdivision to the fighting while Rodimtsev brought his 97th Guards into the first echelon. Following stubborn fighting and after holding off several tank-infantry counterattacks the strongpoints at Tschernitz and Klein Duben were taken and the "Matilda" zone was broken through. The Corps gained another 6 km through the day and reached a line from outside Reiten to the outskirts of Schleife. After an overnight advance along the Spremberg axis the 95th Guards, on the Corps' left flank, encountered Führerbegleit and the 10th SS Panzer Division Frundsberg at Schönheide and Graustein and captured these strongpoints after heavy fighting. The Army's right flank reached the Spree River by the end of April 18.

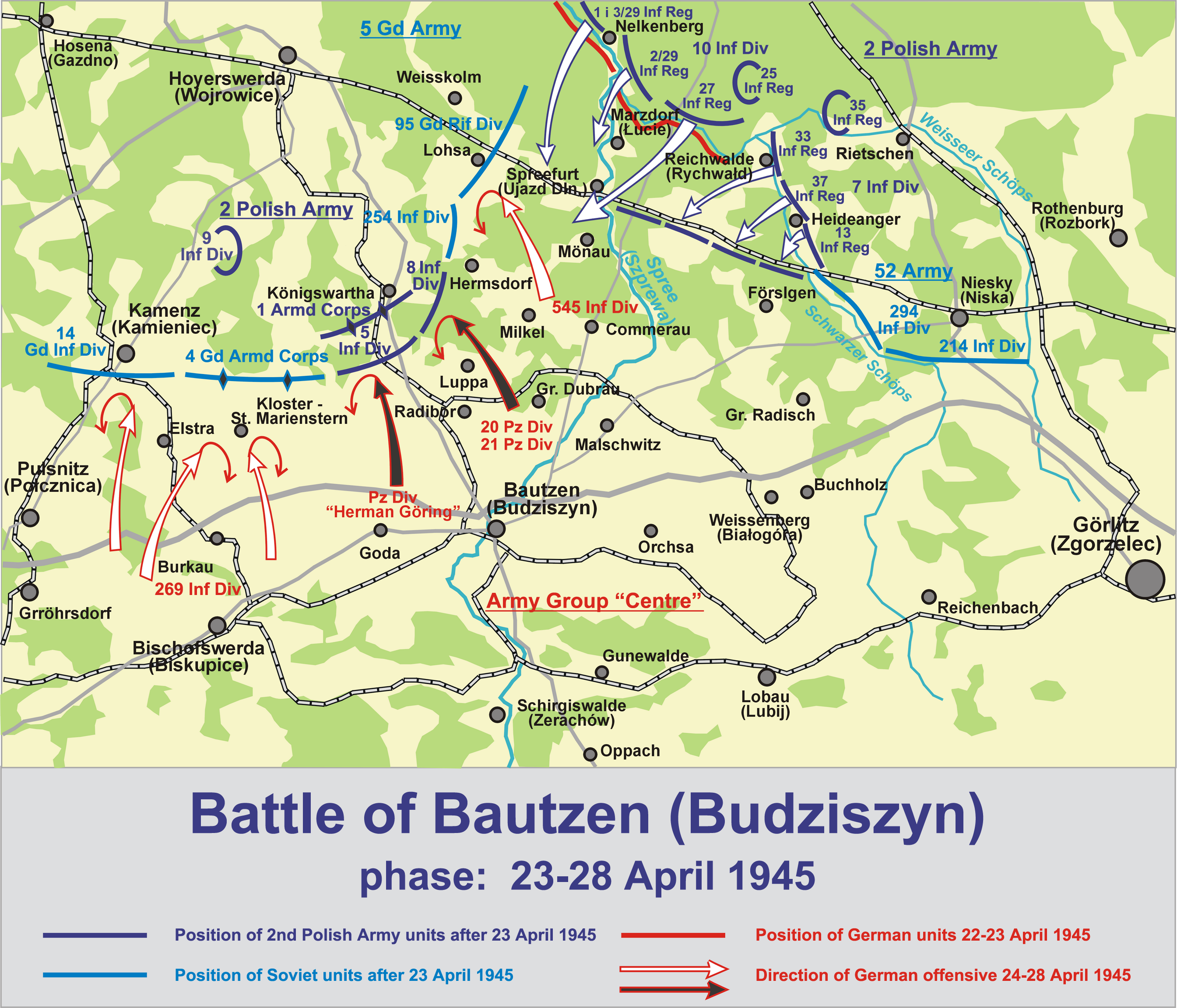
Battle of Bautzen, April 23–28. Note positions of 95th Guards in upper center near Lohsa.

On April 19 the 5th Guards Army, now supported by 6th Guards Mechanized Corps, continued its advance to eliminate the German Spremberg grouping. 33rd Guards Corps joined the 95th Guards to eliminate a bridgehead along the line from Graustein to Slamen, which was part of the third German defensive zone. This zone was penetrated by the end of the day and Spremberg was half encircled. The battle to eliminate this German force continued through April 21, but it was largely left to the 33rd Guards Corps while the 32nd Guards Corps advanced to the west, on that day gaining up to 16 km and reaching a line from Wormlage to Hörlitz. The pursuit continued the next day with 5th Guards Army's main forces gaining up to 30 km and 32nd Guards Corps reaching a line from Doberlug to Grünow. The Front's command was becoming aware of a German grouping in the area of Risa–Dresden that was preparing to attack to the northeast to free their forces surrounded southeast of Berlin.

At this stage of the operation the 95th Guards was reassigned to 33rd Guards Corps. On April 23 the German Dresden grouping launched its offensive, striking the 52nd Army with two infantry divisions reinforced with over 100 tanks and assault guns while a second grouping attacked from the Diehsa area toward Klitten and after breaking through the 48th Rifle Corps reached the rear of Polish 2nd Army. The next day Konev ordered Zhadov to use the 33rd Guards Corps, along with the 14th Guards Rifle Division of 34th Guards Corps, for an attack in the general direction of Lohsa and Ugist to defeat the counterattacking forces and to reestablish direct communications with 2nd Army. The Polish 5th Infantry Division was able to establish direct contact with the 95th Guards in the Königswartha area and the two divisions jointly halted the counterattack on this axis. The division was then directed to destroy the German grouping in cooperation with the 150th Tank Brigade and it cleared out the rear area of 2nd Army by the morning of April 26. From April 27–30 fighting continued along the Görlitz axis, but this did not result in any significant changes to the situation.

== Postwar ==
As of May 1 the 95th Guards was still in 33rd Guards Corps, and remained under this command through the short-lived Prague Offensive. It ended the war with the full title of 95th Guards Rifle, Poltava, Order of Lenin, Order of the Red Banner, Order of Bogdan Khmelnitsky Division. (Russian: 95-я гвардейская стрелковая Полтавская ордена Ленина Краснознамённая ордена Богдана Хмельницкого дивизия.) In a final round of awards on May 28 the division was given the Order of Suvorov, 2nd Degree, for its part in the crossing of the Neisse as well as the capture of Cottbus and other cities and towns in Saxony.

According to STAVKA Directive No. 11096, part 2, dated May 29 the division, which had by now returned to 32nd Guards Corps, was assigned to the Central Group of Forces, effective June 10. This Group was to be responsible for the occupation of Czechoslovakia, Austria and Hungary. General Oleinikov remained in command until August, 1946 when he was replaced by Hero of the Soviet Union Maj. Gen. Grigory Panchenko. This officer was moved to the post of Military Commissar of Stalingrad in April 1947 and was replaced by Maj. Gen. Pyotr Pavlovich Kosolapov, who remained in command until December 1950. The final commander of the 95th Guards was Hero of the Soviet Union Maj. Gen. Mikhail Ilich Duka who took command in July 1954. At this time the division was stationed at Sankt Pölten in Austria while the 13th Guards (now a mechanized division) was at Vienna. On May 15, 1955, the Austrian State Treaty was signed, ending the Allied occupation of that country. The 13th and 95th Guards were then moved to the Carpathian Military District where the latter was disbanded in September.
