= Erdmannsdorff =

Erdmannsdorff is a surname. Notable people with the surname include:

- Friedrich Wilhelm von Erdmannsdorff (1736–1800), German architect
- Gottfried von Erdmannsdorff (1893–1946), German military general
- Otto von Erdmannsdorff (188–1978), German diplomat
- Werner von Erdmannsdorff (1891–1945), German military general

== See also ==
- 55759 Erdmannsdorf
