= List of Knight's Cross of the Iron Cross recipients (E) =

The Knight's Cross of the Iron Cross (German: Ritterkreuz des Eisernen Kreuzes) and its variants were the highest awards in the military and paramilitary forces of Nazi Germany during World War II. The Knight's Cross of the Iron Cross was awarded for a wide range of reasons and across all ranks, from a senior commander for skilled leadership of his troops in battle to a low-ranking soldier for a single act of extreme gallantry. A total of 7,321 awards were made between its first presentation on 30 September 1939 and its last bestowal on 17 June 1945. (Note: Großadmiral and President of Germany Karl Dönitz, Hitler's successor as Head of State (Staatsoberhaupt) and Supreme Commander of the Armed Forces, had ordered the cessation of all promotions and awards as of 11 May 1945 (Dönitz-decree). Consequently the last Knight's Cross awarded to Oberleutnant zur See of the Reserves Georg-Wolfgang Feller on 17 June 1945 must therefore be considered a de facto but not de jure hand-out.) This number is based on the analysis and acceptance of the order commission of the Association of Knight's Cross Recipients (AKCR). Presentations were made to members of the three military branches of the Wehrmacht—the Heer (Army), Kriegsmarine (Navy) and Luftwaffe (Air Force)—as well as the Waffen-SS, the Reichsarbeitsdienst (RAD—Reich Labour Service) and the Volkssturm (German national militia). There were also 43 recipients in the military forces of allies of the Third Reich.

These recipients are listed in the 1986 edition of Walther-Peer Fellgiebel's book, Die Träger des Ritterkreuzes des Eisernen Kreuzes 1939–1945 – The Bearers of the Knight's Cross of the Iron Cross 1939–1945. Fellgiebel was the former chairman and head of the order commission of the AKCR. In 1996, the second edition of this book was published with an addendum delisting 11 of these original recipients. Author Veit Scherzer has cast doubt on a further 193 of these listings. The majority of the disputed recipients had received the award in 1945, when the deteriorating situation of Germany in the final days of World War II in Europe left a number of nominations incomplete and pending in various stages of the approval process.

Listed here are the 188 Knight's Cross recipients whose last name starts with "E". Scherzer has challenged the validity of three of these listings. The recipients are initially ordered alphabetically by last name. The rank listed is the recipient's rank at the time the Knight's Cross was awarded.

== Background ==
The Knight's Cross of the Iron Cross and its higher grades were based on four separate enactments. The first enactment, Reichsgesetzblatt I S. 1573 of 1 September 1939 instituted the Iron Cross (Eisernes Kreuz), the Knight's Cross of the Iron Cross and the Grand Cross of the Iron Cross (Großkreuz des Eisernen Kreuzes). Article 2 of the enactment mandated that the award of a higher class be preceded by the award of all preceding classes. As the war progressed, some of the recipients of the Knight's Cross distinguished themselves further and a higher grade, the Knight's Cross of the Iron Cross with Oak Leaves (Ritterkreuz des Eisernen Kreuzes mit Eichenlaub), was instituted. The Oak Leaves, as they were commonly referred to, were based on the enactment Reichsgesetzblatt I S. 849 of 3 June 1940. In 1941, two higher grades of the Knight's Cross were instituted. The enactment Reichsgesetzblatt I S. 613 of 28 September 1941 introduced the Knight's Cross of the Iron Cross with Oak Leaves and Swords (Ritterkreuz des Eisernen Kreuzes mit Eichenlaub und Schwertern) and the Knight's Cross of the Iron Cross with Oak Leaves, Swords and Diamonds (Ritterkreuz des Eisernen Kreuzes mit Eichenlaub, Schwertern und Brillanten). At the end of 1944 the final grade, the Knight's Cross of the Iron Cross with Golden Oak Leaves, Swords, and Diamonds (Ritterkreuz des Eisernen Kreuzes mit goldenem Eichenlaub, Schwertern und Brillanten), based on the enactment Reichsgesetzblatt 1945 I S. 11 of 29 December 1944, became the final variant of the Knight's Cross authorized.

== Recipients ==
Knight's Cross of the Iron Cross (E)
Service	Number of presentations	Posthumous presentations
Heer	126	6
Kriegsmarine	6	0
Luftwaffe	41	3
Waffen-SS	15	2

The Oberkommando der Wehrmacht (Supreme Command of the Armed Forces) kept separate Knight's Cross lists, one for each of the three military branches, Heer (Army), Kriegsmarine (Navy), Luftwaffe (Air Force) and Waffen-SS. Within each of these lists a unique sequential number was assigned to each recipient. The same numbering paradigm was applied to the higher grades of the Knight's Cross, one list per grade. Of the 188 awards made to servicemen whose last name starts with "E", 22 were later awarded the Knight's Cross of the Iron Cross with Oak Leaves and two the Knight's Cross of the Iron Cross with Oak Leaves and Swords; eleven presentations were made posthumously. Heer members received 126 of the medals, six went to the Kriegsmarine, 41 to the Luftwaffe, and 15 to the Waffen-SS.

This along with the + (plus) indicates that a higher grade of Knight's Cross was awarded as well.
This along with the * (asterisk) indicates that the Knight's Cross was awarded posthumously.
This along with the ? (question mark) indicates that author Veit Scherzer has expressed doubt regarding the veracity and formal correctness of the listing.

Name	Service	Rank	Role and unit (Note: For an explanation of the various naming schemes used by the Luftwaffe, Heer, Kriegsmarine and Waffen-SS refer to nomenclature used by the Wehrmacht and Waffen-SS.)	Date of award	Notes	Image
Paul Ebel	Heer	Unteroffizier	Group leader of the Stabskompanie (Pionierzug)/Grenadier-Regiment 50	17 February 1943	—	—
[Dr.] Ernst Ebeling (Note: The brackets around the doctor title [Dr.] denotes that the academic title was attained after the Knight's Cross of the Iron Cross was awarded.)	Luftwaffe	Hauptmann	Staffelkapitän of the 3./Kampfgeschwader 53 "Legion Condor"	20 March 1945	—	—
Heinz Ebeling	Luftwaffe	Leutnant	Staffelkapitän of the 9./Jagdgeschwader 26 "Schlageter" (Note: According to Scherzer as pilot in the 9./Jagdgeschwader 26 "Schlageter".)	5 November 1940	—	
Werner Ebeling+	Heer	Major	Commander of the II./Grenadier-Regiment 220	9 April 1944	Awarded 763rd Oak Leaves 5 March 1945	—
Kurt Ebener	Luftwaffe	Feldwebel	Pilot in the 4./Jagdgeschwader 3 "Udet"	7 April 1943	—	—
Heinrich Eberbach+	Heer	Oberstleutnant	Commander of Panzer-Regiment 35	4 July 1940	Awarded 42nd Oak Leaves 31 December 1941	
Erich Eberhardt	Waffen-SS	SS-Obersturmbannführer	Ia (operations officer) of the 3. SS-Panzer-Division "Totenkopf"	23 August 1944	—	—
Friedrich-Georg Eberhardt	Heer	Generalleutnant	Commander of the 60. Infanterie-Division (motorized)	31 December 1941	—	—
Georg Eberhardt	Waffen-SS	SS-Sturmbannführer	Commander of estn. SS-Freiwilligen-Panzergrenadier-Bataillon "Narwa" (Note: According to Scherzer as commander of SS-Panzergrenadier-Bataillon "Narwa".)	4 August 1943*	Killed in action 21 July 1943	—
Hans Ebersbach	Luftwaffe	Oberleutnant	Staffelkapitän of the 6./Kampfgeschwader 76 (Note: According to Scherzer as Staffelkapitän in the II./Kampfgeschwader 76.)	8 August 1944*	Killed in action 31 May 1944	—
Helmut Eberspächer	Luftwaffe	Hauptmann	Staffelkapitän of the 3./Nachtschlacht-Gruppe 20	26 January 1945 (Note: According to Scherzer on 24 January 1945.)	—	—
Franz Ebert	Luftwaffe	Oberleutnant (Note: According to Scherzer as Oberleutnant of the Reserves on 17 April 1945.)	Chief of the 10./Flak-Regiment 23 (motorized)	14 April 1945	—	—
Edwin Ebinger	Heer	Oberfeldwebel	Company troop leader in the 12./Gebirgsjäger-Regiment 13	4 November 1943	—	—
August-Friedrich Ebke	Heer	Oberstleutnant of the Reserves	Commander of Grenadier-Regiment 464	14 April 1945	—	—
Adam Ebner	Heer	Oberfeldwebel	Zugführer (platoon leader) in the 3./Gebirgsjäger-Regiment 137	19 November 1941	—	—
Fridolin Ebner	Heer	Oberfeldwebel	Zugführer (platoon leader) in the 9./Grenadier-Regiment 7	28 October 1944	—	—
Josef Eck	Heer	Hauptmann	Leader of the 4./Panzer-Regiment 4	15 July 1944	—	—
Reinhold Eckardt	Luftwaffe	Oberleutnant	Adjutant of the II./Nachtjagdgeschwader 1	30 August 1941	—	—
Willi Eckardt	Heer	Major	Commander of the III./Grenadier-Regiment 521	7 December 1943	—	—
Fritz Eckebrecht	Luftwaffe	Oberleutnant	Observer in the 4.(H)/Aufklärungs-Gruppe 31	9 November 1944	—	—
Paul Ecker+	Heer	Major	Commander of the I./Panzergrenadier-Regiment 9	16 March 1944	Awarded 634th Oak Leaves 28 October 1944	—
Franz Eckerle+	Luftwaffe	Hauptmann	Staffelkapitän of the 1./Jagdgeschwader 54	18 September 1941	Awarded 82nd Oak Leaves 12 March 1942	—
Alois Eckert	Heer	Feldwebel	Zugführer (platoon leader) in the 9./Panzer-Regiment 33	3 August 1942	—	—
Ernst Eckert	Heer	Oberleutnant of the Reserves	Leader of the 11./Jäger-Regiment 229	9 June 1944	—	—
Hans Eckert	Waffen-SS	SS-Obersturmführer of the Reserves	Leader of the II./SS-Panzergrenadier-Regiment 3 "Deutschland" of the SS-Panzer-Kampfgruppe "Das Reich" (Note: According to Scherzer as leader of the II./SS-Panzergrenadier-Regiment 3 "Deutschland".)	4 May 1944	—	—
Alfons Eckhardt	Heer	Major	Commander of the III./Infanterie-Regiment 11 (motorized)	6 October 1942*	Killed in action 11 August 1942	—
Hermann Eckhardt (Note: According to Scherzer name is spelled Hermann Eckardt.)	Heer	Feldwebel	Zugführer (platoon leader) in the 1./Panzer-Abteilung 8	28 March 1945	—	—
Johann-Heinrich Eckhardt+	Heer	Oberst	Commander of Jäger-Regiment 38	20 May 1942	Awarded 644th Oak Leaves 3 November 1944	—
Wilhelm Eckhardt	Heer	Hauptmann of the Reserves	Commander of the II./Grenadier-Regiment 503	17 September 1944	—	—
Oskar Eckholt	Heer	Oberst	Commander of Artillerie-Regiment 178	9 April 1943	—	—
Dr. Josef-Franz Eckinger+	Heer	Hauptmann	Leader of the II./Schützen-Regiment 1	17 March 1941	Awarded 48th Oak Leaves 31 December 1941	
Fritz Eckstein	Waffen-SS	SS-Rottenführer	Richtschütze (gunner) in the 1./SS-Panzer-Jäger-Abteilung 12 "Hitlerjugend" (Note: According to Scherzer as Richtschütze (gunner) in the 1./SS-Panzer-Jäger-Abteilung 12.)	18 November 1944	—	—
Maximilian Reichsfreiherr von Edelsheim+	Heer	Oberstleutnant	Commander of Radfahr-Abteilung 1	30 July 1941	Awarded 162nd Oak Leaves 23 December 1942; 105th Swords 23 October 1944	—
Anton Eder	Heer	Oberst	Abschnittskommandant eines Verteidigungsabschnitts (defensive sector commander) in Berlin (Note: According to Scherzer as commander of Verteidigungs-Abschnitt (defensive sector) "F" (Spandau/Charlottenburg)/Verteidigungsbereich (defensive area) Berlin.)	26 April 1945	—	—
Georg-Peter Eder+	Luftwaffe	Oberleutnant	Staffelkapitän of the 6./Jagdgeschwader 1	24 June 1944	Awarded 663rd Oak Leaves 25 November 1944	—
Martin Eder	Heer	Hauptmann	Leader of the I./Infanterie-Regiment 481	28 November 1940	—	—
Heinz Edhofer	Luftwaffe	Oberfeldwebel	Pilot in the 7./Schlachtgeschwader 2 "Immelmann"	30 November 1944	—	—
Alois Eding	Heer	Oberleutnant of the Reserves	Leader of the 1./Grenadier-Regiment 19	12 October 1943	—	—
Heinrich Edse	Heer	Oberleutnant of the Reserves	Leader of the 1./Grenadier-Regiment 407	15 April 1944	—	—
Franz Edtbauer	Heer	Leutnant of the Reserves	Leader of the 1.(gepanzert)/Panzergrenadier-Regiment 11 (Note: According to Scherzer as leader of the 1./Panzergrenadier-Regiment 11.)	4 June 1944*	Died of wounds 13 April 1944	—
Walter Eggemann	Heer	Leutnant of the Reserves	Aide-de-camp in the Stab/Grenadier-Regiment 680	18 April 1943	—	—
Wilhelm Eggemann+	Heer	Major	Commander of the II./Grenadier-Regiment 94	20 April 1943	Awarded 468th Oak Leaves 4 May 1944	—
Paul Egger? (Note: No evidence of the award can be found in the German Federal Archives. Veit Scherzer was denied access to files, which could help clarify the case, of the Association of Knight's Cross Recipients (AKCR) on the grounds of the Bundesarchivgesetz (German Archive Law). Paul Egger was a member of the AKCR.)	Waffen-SS	SS-Obersturmführer	Zugführer (platoon leader) in the 1./schwere SS-Panzer-Abteilung 502	28 April 1945	—	—
Reinhard Egger+	Luftwaffe	Oberleutnant	Leader of the 10./Fallschirmjäger-Regiment 1	9 July 1941	Awarded 510th Oak Leaves 24 June 1944	
Hermann Eggers	Luftwaffe	Hauptmann	Chief of the 3./Flak-Regiment 64 (Note: According to Scherzer as chief of the 3./Flak-Regiment 64 (motorized/all-terrain).)	21 August 1942	—	—
Johann Eggers	Heer	Unteroffizier	Richtschütze (gunner) in the 7./Panzer-Regiment 6	14 December 1943	—	—
Walter Eggers	Heer	Oberleutnant	Chief of the 7./Grenadier-Regiment 116	29 August 1943	—	
Wilhelm Eggers	Heer	Oberleutnant (Note: According to Scherzer as Oberleutnant of the Reserves and chief of the 13.(IG)/Infanterie-Regiment 490.)	Chief of the 13.(IG)/Infanterie-Regiment 490	16 March 1942	—	—
Alfred Egghardt	Heer	Leutnant of the Reserves	Chief of the 2./Sturmgeschütz-Brigade 912	20 April 1945	—	—
[Dr.] Kurt Egle	Luftwaffe	Oberleutnant	Leader of the 8./Luftnachrichten-Regiment 53	5 July 1944 (Note: According to Scherzer on 2 July 1944.)	—	—
Karl Eglseer	Heer	Generalmajor	Commander of the 4. Gebirgs-Division	23 October 1941	—	—
Josef Ehinger	Heer	Oberjäger	Group leader in the 6./Gebirgsjäger-Regiment 100	22 August 1943	—	
Curt Ehle+	Heer	Hauptmann of the Reserves	Leader of the 1./Kradschützen-Bataillon 15	27 July 1941	Awarded 673rd Oak Leaves 29 November 1944	—
Walter Ehle	Luftwaffe	Major	Gruppenkommandeur of the II./Nachtjagdgeschwader 1	29 August 1943	—	—
Hans Ehlers	Luftwaffe	Oberleutnant	Staffelkapitän of the 3./Jagdgeschwader 1 "Oesau"	9 June 1944	—	—
Bruno Ehm	Heer	Oberfeldwebel	Zugführer (platoon leader) in the 8./Grenadier-Regiment 162	1 February 1945	—	—
Fritz Ehrath	Waffen-SS	SS-Obersturmbannführer	Commander of SS-Panzergrenadier-Regiment 9 "Germania"	23 February 1944	—	—
Rudolf Ehrenberger	Luftwaffe	Oberfeldwebel	Pilot in the 6./Jagdgeschwader 53	6 April 1944* (Note: According to Scherzer on 5 April 1944.)	Killed in action 8 March 1944	—
Werner Ehrig	Heer	Oberstleutnant im Generalstab (in the General Staff)	Ia (operations officer) of the 22. Infanterie-Division (LL) (Note: According to Scherzer as Ia (operations officer) of the 22. Infanterie-Division.)	26 May 1940	—	—
Heinrich Ehrler+	Luftwaffe	Leutnant	Pilot in the 6./Jagdgeschwader 5	4 September 1942	Awarded 265th Oak Leaves 2 August 1943	
Günther Ehrt	Heer	Hauptmann	Leader of the I./Infanterie-Regiment 41 (motorized)	3 May 1942	—	—
Karl Eibl+	Heer	Oberstleutnant	Commander of the III./Infanterie-Regiment 131	15 August 1940	Awarded 50th Oak Leaves 31 December 1941; 21st Swords 19 December 1942	—
Karl Eich	Heer	Oberfeldwebel	Zugführer (platoon leader) in the 6./Grenadier-Regiment 282	20 January 1944	—	—
Diethelm von Eichel-Streiber	Luftwaffe	Hauptmann	Staffelkapitän of the Stab/Jagdgeschwader 51 "Mölders" (Note: According to Scherzer as Staffelkapitän of the Stabs-Staffel/Jagdgeschwader 51 "Mölders".)	5 April 1944	—	—
Hans-Henning Eichert	Heer	Oberleutnant	Chief of the 6./Schützen-Regiment 11	14 March 1942	—	—
Robert Eichert	Heer	Oberfeldwebel	Zugführer (platoon leader) in the 8./Panzer-Regiment 36	20 April 1943	—	—
Hugo Eichhorn	Waffen-SS	SS-Hauptsturmführer of the Reserves	In the Stab SS-Pionier-Bataillon 5 "Wiking" (Note: According to Scherzer in the Stab Pionier-Bataillon SS-Division "Wiking".)	15 January 1943	—	—
Erich Eichler	Heer	Hauptmann	Deputy leader of the II./Artillerie-Regiment 20 (motorized)	21 September 1944	—	—
Dr. Hilmar Eichler	Heer	Oberst of the Reserves	Commander of Grenadier-Regiment 306	16 November 1944	—	—
Kurt Eichler	Heer	Hauptmann	Leader of the II./Grenadier-Regiment 189	12 August 1944	—	—
Richard Eichler	Heer	Oberstleutnant	Commander of Grenadier-Regiment 212	29 January 1943	—	—
Wolfgang Eichler	Heer	Leutnant of the Reserves	Leader of the 6./Panzer-Regiment 29	20 December 1943	—	—
Otto Eichloff	Luftwaffe	Feldwebel	Pilot in the 4./Kampfgeschwader 30	16 August 1940	—	
Hans Eichmeier (Note: According to Scherzer name is Johann Eichmeier who received the Knight's Cross of the Iron Cross as commander of leichte Flak-Abteilung 854 (verlegefähig).)	Heer	Major of the Reserves	Commander of leichte Flak-Abteilung 854 (motorized)	11 June 1944	—	—
Werner von Eichstedt	Heer	Oberst	Commander of Infanterie-Regiment 436	18 August 1942	—	—
Alfred Eick	Kriegsmarine	Oberleutnant zur See	Commander of U-510	31 March 1944	—	—
Theodor Eicke+	Waffen-SS	SS-Gruppenführer and Generalleutnant of the Waffen-SS	Commander of SS-Division "Totenkopf"	26 December 1941	Awarded 88th Oak Leaves 20 April 1942	A black-and-white photograph of a man in semi profile wearing a military uniform and neck order, in shape of an Iron Cross. His dark hair is combed to the back. He has determined facial expression.
Alfred Eidel+	Heer	Hauptmann	Leader of the I./Infanterie-Regiment 171	24 September 1942	Awarded 283rd Oak Leaves 24 August 1943	—
Karl Eiden	Heer	Oberfeldwebel	Zugführer (platoon leader) in the 8.(MG)/Grenadier-Regiment 97 (Note: According to Scherzer as Zugführer (platoon leader) in the 8./Grenadier-Regiment 97.)	5 March 1943	—	—
[Prof. Dr.] Hans Eikmeier (Note: The brackets around the professor and doctor title [Prof. Dr.] denotes that the academic title was attained after the Knight's Cross of the Iron Cross was awarded.)	Heer	Rittmeister	Leader of the II./Reiter-Regiment 32	30 September 1944	—	—
Peter Eil	Heer	Feldwebel	Zugführer (platoon leader) in the 1./Grenadier-Regiment 105	11 January 1944	—	—
Adolf Eilers	Heer	Major	Commander of Grenadier-Regiment Gruppe 184	10 September 1944	—	—
Friedrich-Wilhelm von Einem called von Rothmaler	Heer	Leutnant of the Reserves	Vorgeschobener Beobachter (forward observer) in the I./Artillerie-Regiment 230	4 December 1942	—	—
Hans-Egon von Einem? (Note: Hans-Egon von Einem's nomination by the corps was never forwarded or was lost due to the military situation. A second nomination was submitted after the evacuation of East Prussia and after the German capitulation. This nomination was never processed. The order commission of the Association of Knight's Cross Recipients (AKCR) never addressed this case. The presentation date is an assumption by Walther-Peer Fellgiebel.)	Heer	Oberst	Commander of Panzergrenadier-Regiment 21	11 May 1945*	Suicide 8 May 1945	—
Johann Einfalt	Heer	Obergefreiter	In the III./Jäger-Regiment 38 (Note: According to Scherzer in the 3./Jäger-Regiment 38.)	28 February 1945	—	—
Georg Einhoff	Heer	Oberleutnant of the Reserves	Chief of the 8.(MG)/Grenadier-Regiment 366 (Note: According to Scherzer as chief of the 8./Grenadier-Regiment 366.)	6 June 1943	—	
Alois Eisele+	Heer	Hauptmann	Commander of the III./Grenadier-Regiment 61	15 December 1943	Awarded 695th Oak Leaves 12 January 1945	—
Franz Eisenach	Luftwaffe	Hauptmann	Staffelkapitän of the 3./Jagdgeschwader 54 (Note: According to Scherzer as pilot in the II./Jagdgeschwader 54.)	10 October 1944	—	—
Erich Eisenblätter	Heer	Oberfeldwebel	Zugführer (platoon leader) in the Stabskompanie/Grenadier-Regiment 176	5 April 1944	—	—
Erich Eisermann	Heer	Feldwebel	Reconnaissance troop leader in the 1.(Panzerspäh)/Panzer-Aufklärungs-Abteilung 23 (Note: According to Scherzer as reconnaissance troop leader in the 1./Panzer-Aufklärungs-Abteilung 23.)	9 December 1944	—	—
Johannes Eisermann	Heer	Oberst	Commander of Infanterie-Regiment 156 (motorized)	25 August 1942	—	—
Johann Eisgruber	Heer	Feldwebel	Pioneer Zugführer (platoon leader) in the Stabskompanie/Grenadier-Regiment 62	31 August 1943	—	—
Karl Eisgruber? (Note: No evidence of the award to Karl Eisgruber can be found in the German Federal Archives. According to Walther-Peer Fellgiebel the presentation was made on 1 June 1945 by the Armee-Oberkommando 6 (6th Army), which was not authorized to do so.)	Heer	Oberstleutnant	Commander of Gebirgsjäger-Regiment 98	1 June 1945	—	—
Alois Eisl	Heer	Major	Leader of Gebirgsjäger-Regiment 98	9 December 1944	—	—
Emil Eitel	Luftwaffe	Hauptmann	Commander of the III./Luftwaffen-Jäger-Regiment 30	8 August 1944	—	—
[Dr.] Volkhard Eitner	Heer	Hauptmann	Commander of the I./Grenadier-Regiment 212	10 June 1943	—	—
Arthur von Ekesparre	Heer	Oberstleutnant im Generalstab (in the General Staff)	Ia (operations officer) of the 13. Panzer-Division	15 January 1945	—	—
Josef Elbl	Heer	Oberst	Commander of Grenadier-Regiment 330	22 August 1943	—	—
Walter Elflein+	Heer	Oberleutnant of the Reserves	Leader of the 2./Grenadier-Regiment 95	8 October 1943	Awarded 347th Oak Leaves 5 December 1943	—
Konrad Ellmer	Luftwaffe	Oberfeldwebel	Observer in the 14.(Eis)/Kampfgeschwader 27 "Boelcke" (Note: According to Scherzer as observer in the 14.(Eis/Nord)/Kampfgeschwader 27 "Boelcke".)	9 June 1944	—	—
Gustav Ellmers	Heer	Oberleutnant	Chief of the 2./Panzergrenadier-Regiment 14	28 February 1945	—	—
Herbert Eltrich	Heer	Hauptmann	Commander of the Heeres-Pionier-Bataillon 52 (motorized)	9 December 1943	—	—
Harald Freiherr von Elverfeldt+	Heer	Generalmajor	Leader of the 9. Panzer-Division	9 December 1944	Awarded 801st Oak Leaves 23 March 1945	—
Hans Emig	Luftwaffe	Oberstleutnant	Commander of Kampfgruppe 806 (Note: According to Scherzer as commander of Küstenflieger-Gruppe 806.)	21 August 1941*	Killed in action 28 June 1941	—
Heinz Emmerling	Heer	Hauptmann of the Reserves	Commander of the II./Grenadier-Regiment 464	23 February 1944	—	—
Carl Emmermann+	Kriegsmarine	Kapitänleutnant	Commander of U-172	27 November 1942	Awarded 256th Oak Leaves 4 July 1943	
Dr. jur. Ernst Emmert	Heer	Oberleutnant of the Reserves	Leader of the I./Infanterie-Regiment 282	31 December 1941	—	—
Werner Endell	Kriegsmarine	Kapitän zur See	Harbor commander of "Saint-Malo"	18 August 1944	—	—
Eduard Ender	Heer	Oberfeldwebel	Zugführer (platoon leader) in the 1./Panzer-Jäger-Abteilung 49	23 February 1944	—	—
Hans Ender	Heer	Hauptmann	Commander of the II./Grenadier-Regiment 545	5 April 1945	—	—
Engelbert Endrass+	Kriegsmarine	Oberleutnant zur See	Commander of U-46	5 September 1940	Awarded 14th Oak Leaves 10 June 1941	
Hans Endreß	Heer	Hauptmann	Leader of the I./Panzer-Artillerie-Regiment 74	14 August 1943	—	—
Theodor Endres	Heer	Generalleutnant zur Verwendung (for disposition)	Commander of the 212. Infanterie-Division	13 July 1940	—	—
Hans Endreß	Waffen-SS	SS-Hauptsturmführer of the Reserves	Leader of the II./SS-Panzergrenadier-Regiment 6 "Theodor Eicke"	23 March 1945	—	—
August Endriß	Heer	Hauptmann of the Reserves	Chief of the 4./Artillerie-Regiment 219	14 August 1943	—	—
Herbert Engbrecht	Heer	Hauptmann	Commander of the III./Infanterie-Regiment 3	23 November 1941	—	—
Gerhard Engel+	Heer	Oberstleutnant	Commander of Füsilier-Regiment 27	4 July 1944	Awarded 679th Oak Leaves 11 December 1944	
Heinrich Engel	Heer	Unteroffizier of the Reserves (Note: According to Scherzer as Unteroffizier.)	Gun leader of the 2./Sturm-Geschütz-Abteilung 259	2 November 1943	—	—
Hermann Engel	Heer	Hauptmann	Commander of the I./Grenadier-Regiment 1122	17 March 1945	—	—
Otto Engel	Luftwaffe	Leutnant of the Reserves	Pilot in the 5./Kampfgeschwader 53 "Legion Condor" (Note: According to Scherzer as Staffelführer of the 5./Kampfgeschwader 53 "Legion Condor".)	28 February 1945	—	—
Walter Engel	Luftwaffe	Hauptmann	Staffelkapitän of the 3./Nachtjagdgeschwader 5	28 February 1945	—	—
Erwin Engelbrecht	Heer	Generalmajor	Commander of the 163. Infanterie-Division	9 May 1940	—	
Karl Engelbrecht	Heer	Wachtmeister	Zugführer (platoon leader) of the 1./Divisions-Füsilier-Bataillon 98	20 January 1944	—	—
Wilhelm Engelbrecht	Waffen-SS	SS-Hauptsturmführer and Hauptmann of the Schupo	Leader of the II./SS-Polizei-Schützen-Regiment 19 (Note: According to Scherzer as leader of the II./SS-Polizei-Regiment 19.)	11 December 1944	—	—
Günter Engelhardt	Heer	Oberst	Commander of Grenadier-Regiment 30 (motorized)	9 April 1943	—	—
[Dr.] Johann Engelhardt	Luftwaffe	Oberleutnant	Chief of 8./Fallschirmjäger-Regiment 6	29 February 1944	—	
Kurt Engelhardt	Heer	Oberwachtmeister of the Reserves (Note: According to Scherzer as Oberwachtmeister and Zugführer (platoon leader) in the 2./Sturmgeschütz-Brigade 232.)	Zugführer (platoon leader) in the 2./Heeres-Sturmgeschütz-Brigade 232	28 February 1945	—	—
Fritz Engelien	Heer	Major	Leader of Divisions-Füsilier-Bataillon 15	18 December 1944	—	—
Hans Engelien+	Heer	Major	Leader of Panzer-Aufklärung-Abteilung 12	12 August 1944	Awarded 788th Oak Leaves 16 March 1945	—
Richard Engelmann	Heer	Hauptmann	Chief of the 1./Sturmgeschütz-Brigade 912	27 July 1944	—	—
Alfred Engfer	Heer	Hauptmann	Commander of the III./Infanterie-Regiment 523	13 September 1942*	Died of wounds 1 September 1942	—
Siegfried Engfer	Luftwaffe	Feldwebel	Pilot in the III./Jagdgeschwader 3 "Udet"	2 October 1942	—	
Alfred Engler	Heer	Major	Leader of Grenadier-Regiment 97	18 November 1944	—	—
Walter Enneccerus	Luftwaffe	Hauptmann	Gruppenkommandeur of the II./Sturzkampfgeschwader 2 "Immelmann"	21 July 1940	—	—
Karl Ens	Heer	Major	Commander of the II./Infanterie-Regiment 125 (motorized)	14 May 1941	—	—
Rudolf Enseling	Waffen-SS	SS-Sturmbannführer	Commander of the I./SS-Panzer-Regiment 2 "Das Reich" (Note: According to Scherzer as commander of the I./SS-Panzer-Regiment 2.)	23 August 1944	—	—
Wolfgang Ensle	Luftwaffe	Fahnenjunker-Feldwebel	Pilot in the 3./Schlachtgeschwader 2 "Immelmann" (Note: According to Scherzer as pilot in the I./Schlachtgeschwader 2 "Immelmann".)	8 August 1944	—	—
Alfred Enßle	Luftwaffe	Hauptmann	Staffelkapitän of the 2./Kampfgeschwader 76 (Note: According to Scherzer as Staffelkapitän of the 3./Kampfgeschwader 76.)	31 December 1943	—	—
Josef Enzensberger	Luftwaffe	Oberfeldwebel	Pilot in the 1./Schlachtgeschwader 10 (Note: According to Scherzer as pilot in the I./Schlachtgeschwader 10.)	28 February 1945	—	—
Heinrich Eppen	Luftwaffe	Oberleutnant	Staffelkapitän of the 1./Sturzkampfgeschwader 3	5 July 1941	—	—
Dr. jur. Johannes Erasmus	Heer	Major im Generalstab (in the General Staff)	Ia (operations officer) in the XXXXVI. Panzerkorps (Note: According to Scherzer as Ia (operations officer) in the XXXXVIII. Panzerkorps.)	13 April 1944	—	—
Ludwig Erath	Heer	Unteroffizier	Troop leader in the 8./Grenadier-Regiment 351	24 December 1944	—	—
Albrecht Erdmann	Heer	Oberstleutnant	Commander of Kradschützen-Bataillon 53	12 September 1941	—	—
Armin Erdmann	Heer	Oberleutnant	Leader of the 6./Panzergrenadier-Regiment 79	3 January 1943	—	—
Hans Erdmann	Heer	Hauptmann	Commander of the I./Panzergrenadier-Regiment 3	10 December 1942*	Killed in action 7 December 1942	—
Otto Erdmann	Heer	Leutnant (Note: According to Scherzer as Oberleutnant.)	Leader of the 2./Panzergrenadier-Regiment 66	9 December 1944	—	—
Rudolph Erdmann	Luftwaffe	Oberst	Commander of Flak-Regiment 153 (motorized)	13 February 1945	—	—
Dipl.-Ing. Wolfgang Erdmann	Luftwaffe	Generalleutnant	Commander of the 7. Fallschirmjäger-Division	8 February 1945	—	—
Gottfried von Erdmannsdorff	Heer	Oberst	Commander of Infanterie-Regiment 171	20 March 1942	—	—
Werner von Erdmannsdorff	Heer	Oberst	Commander of Infanterie-Regiment 30 (motorized) (Note: According to Scherzer as commander of Infanterie-Regiment 30 (motorized) and leader of the 18. Infanterie-Division (motorized).)	27 February 1942	—	
Hans Erdmenger	Kriegsmarine	Korvettenkapitän	Commander of destroyer Wilhelm Heidkamp (Z-21)	3 November 1940	—	—
Ernst Erhardt (Note: According to Fellgiebel the name is spelled "Ernst Ehrhardt".)	Heer	Unteroffizier	Group leader in Grenadier-Regiment 481	23 March 1945	—	—
Rudolf Erler	Heer	Oberst of the Reserves	Commander of Grenadier-Regiment 538	15 March 1943	—	—
Helmut Ermoneit	Luftwaffe	Oberleutnant	Adjutant of the II./Kampfgeschwader 4 "General Wever"	8 August 1944	—	—
Albert Ernst	Heer	Leutnant	Zugführer (platoon leader) in the 1./schwere Panzer-Jäger-Abteilung 519	22 January 1944	—	—
Heinrich Ernst	Heer	Oberfeldwebel	Deputy leader of the 2./Panzer-Aufklärungs-Abteilung 9	23 March 1945	—	—
Otto Ernst	Heer	Hauptmann	Commander of the II./Grenadier-Regiment 725	6 October 1944	—	—
Richard Ernst	Heer	Oberstleutnant	Commander of Gebirgsjäger-Regiment 100	20 October 1944	—	—
Karl-Heinz Ertel	Waffen-SS	SS-Hauptsturmführer of the Reserves	Regiment adjutant of the niederländisch SS-Freiwilligen-Panzergrenadier-Regiment 49 "De Ruyter" (Note: According to Scherzer as adjutant of SS-Freiwilligen-Panzergrenadier-Regiment 49 "De Ruyter" (niederländisch Nr. 2).)	23 August 1944	—	—
Reinhold Ertel	Heer	Oberleutnant	Leader of the 1./Sturmgeschütz-Abteilung 276	31 January 1944	—	—
Franz Ertolitsch	Heer	Obergefreiter	Machine gunner in the 6./Panzergrenadier-Regiment 12	9 January 1945	—	—
Albin Esch	Heer	Major	Commander of the III./Gebirgsjäger-Regiment 85	13 June 1941	—	—
Georg Eschenbacher	Heer	Oberfeldwebel	Zugführer (platoon leader) in the 4.(MG)/Grenadier-Regiment 451 (Note: According to Scherzer as Zugführer (platoon leader) in the 4./Grenadier-Regiment 451.)	24 September 1943	—	—
Fritz Eschmann	Heer	Oberleutnant	Leader of the 4./Feldersatz-Bataillon 116	12 August 1944	—	—
Hans-Karl Freiherr von Esebeck	Heer	Oberst	Commander of the 6. Schützen-Brigade	4 July 1940	—	
Otto Eske	Heer	Feldwebel	Zugführer (platoon leader) in the 5./Infanterie-Regiment 4 (Note: According to Scherzer as Zugführer (platoon leader) in the 5.(Jäger)/Infanterie-Regiment 4.)	27 July 1941	—	—
Gotthard Eßbach	Heer	Oberleutnant	Chief of the 9./Infanterie-Regiment 31	22 September 1941	—	—
Richard Essig	Heer	Hauptmann of the Reserves	Leader of the I./Grenadier-Regiment 273	2 September 1944	—	—
Willi Eßlinger	Waffen-SS	SS-Hauptscharführer	Zugführer (platoon leader) in the 3./SS-Panzer-Jäger-Abteilung 5 "Wiking" (Note: According to Scherzer as Zugführer (platoon leader) in the 3./Panzer-Jäger-Abteilung of the SS-Panzergrenadier-Division "Wiking".)	19 June 1943	—	—
Wolf-Udo Ettel+	Luftwaffe	Leutnant	Staffelführer of the 4./Jagdgeschwader 3 "Udet" (Note: According to Scherzer as pilot and not Staffelführer in the 4./Jagdgeschwader 3 "Udet".)	1 June 1943	Awarded 289th Oak Leaves 31 August 1943	—
Alois Etthöfer	Waffen-SS	SS-Sturmbannführer and Major of the Schupo	Commander of SS-Polizei-Panzer-Abteilung 4	17 March 1945*	Killed in action 20 November 1944	—
Gerhard Etzold	Heer	Oberleutnant	Zugführer (platoon leader) in the 2./Kradschützen-Bataillon 8	3 June 1940	—	—
Jonas Graf zu Eulenburg	Heer	Oberst	Commander of fortress Glogau	22 March 1945	—	—
Karl-Heinz Euling	Waffen-SS	SS-Hauptsturmführer	Commander of the I./SS-Panzergrenadier-Regiment 22 "Frundsberg" (Note: According to Scherzer as commander of the IV./SS-Panzergrenadier-Regiment 22.)	15 October 1944	—	—
Dr. rer.pol. Wolfgang Everling	Heer	Hauptmann	Chief of the 3./Panzer-Regiment 36	10 February 1945	—	—
Franz Evers	Luftwaffe	Leutnant	Pilot in the 3./Fernaufklärungs-Gruppe 121 (Note: According to Scherzer as pilot in the Aufklärungsstaffel 3.(F)/121.)	17 December 1941	—	—
Walter Evers	Heer	Leutnant of the Reserves	Leader of the 11./Infanterie-Regiment 271	4 December 1941	—	—
Wolfgang Everth	Heer	Hauptmann	Leader of the Panzer-Aufklärungs-Abteilung 3 (Note: According to Scherzer as leader of the Aufklärungs-Abteilung 3 (motorized).)	6 July 1942	—	—
Edwin Ewald	Heer	Leutnant of the Reserves	Zugführer (platoon leader) in the 2./Pionier-Bataillon 298	21 August 1941	—	—
Heinz Ewald	Luftwaffe	Leutnant	Pilot in the 5./Jagdgeschwader 52	20 April 1945	—	—
Werner Ewald	Luftwaffe	Major	Commander of the II./Fallschirmjäger-Regiment 2	12 September 1944 (Note: According to Scherzer on 17 September 1944.)	—	
Wolfgang Ewald	Luftwaffe	Major	Gruppenkommandeur of the III./Jagdgeschwader 3 "Udet"	9 December 1942	—	—
Heinz-Martin Ewert+	Heer	Hauptmann	Commander of the II./Infanterie-Regiment 2	23 November 1941	Awarded 750th Oak Leaves 22 February 1945	—
Herbert Ewert	Heer	Oberst	Commander of Panzergrenadier-Regiment 104	18 August 1942	—	—
Wolf Ewert	Heer	Oberstleutnant	Commander of Grenadier-Regiment 274	18 July 1944	—	—
Herbert Eymer	Heer	Oberleutnant of the Reserves	Commander of the II.(gepanzert)/Panzergrenadier-Regiment 129	18 April 1943*	Killed in action 20 February 1943	—
Robert Eyssen	Kriegsmarine	Konteradmiral	Commander of auxiliary cruiser Komet (HSK-7)	29 November 1941	—	—
Oskar Eysser	Heer	Hauptmann	Chief of the 3./Panzergrenadier-Regiment 31	3 November 1944	—	—
