= Von Erdmannsdorff =

Von Erdmannsdorff is the name of:

- Friedrich Wilhelm von Erdmannsdorff (1736–1800), German architect
- Gottfried von Erdmannsdorff (1893-1946), German Wehrmacht general
- Otto von Erdmannsdorff (1888–1978), German diplomat
