= Operation Spring Awakening =

Last major German offensive on the Eastern Front of World War II

Coordinates: 46°59′N 18°21′E

- Part of the Eastern Front of World War II
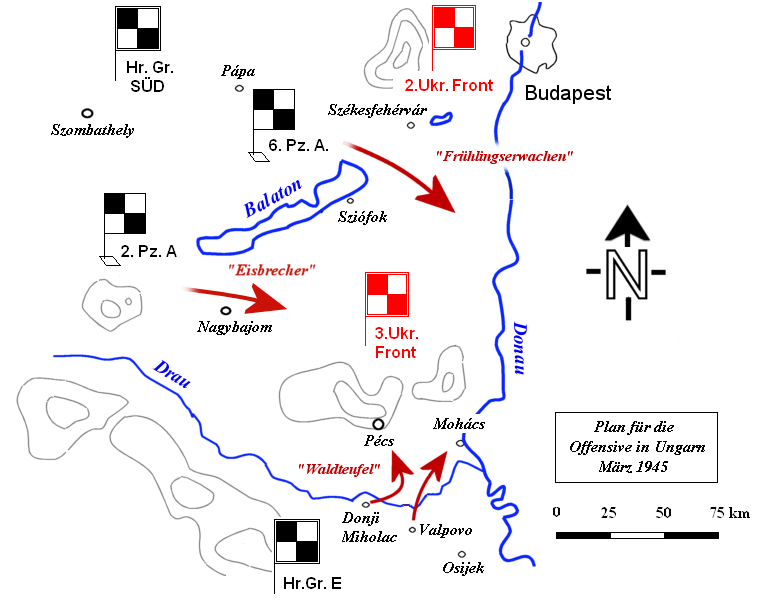
- German advances during the operation
Date	6–15 March 1945
Location	Lake Balaton, Kingdom of Hungary
Result	Allied victory

Belligerents
Germany; Hungary	Soviet Union; Bulgaria; Yugoslav Partisans

Commanders and leaders
(Nazi Germany) Otto Wöhler: (Nazi Germany) Hermann Balck; (Nazi Germany) Max de Angelis; (Nazi Germany) Sepp Dietrich; József Heszlényi; (Nazi Germany) Otto Deßloch; (Nazi Germany) Max von Weichs: (Nazi Germany) Alexander Löhr	(Soviet Union) Fyodor Tolbukhin: (Soviet Union) Nikanor Zakhvatayev; (Soviet Union) Nikolai Gagen; (Soviet Union) Sergei Trofimenko; (Soviet Union) Mikhail Sharokhin; (Tsardom of Bulgaria (1908–1946)) Vladimir Stoychev; (Yugoslav Partisans) Kosta Nađ; (Soviet Union) Vladimir Sudets; (Soviet Union) Rodion Malinovsky: (Soviet Union) Sergei Goryunov

Units involved
(Nazi Germany) Army Group South: (Nazi Germany) 6th Army; (Nazi Germany) 6th Panzer Army; (Nazi Germany) 2nd Panzer Army; 3rd Army; (Nazi Germany) Luftflotte 4; (Nazi Germany) Army Group F: (Nazi Germany) Army Group E	(Soviet Union) 3rd Ukrainian Front: (Soviet Union) 4th Guards Army; (Soviet Union) 26th Army; (Soviet Union) 27th Army; (Soviet Union) 57th Army; (Tsardom of Bulgaria (1908–1946)) 1st Army; (Democratic Federal Yugoslavia) 3rd Army; (Soviet Union) 17th Air Army; (Soviet Union) 2nd Ukrainian Front: (Soviet Union) 5th Air Army

Strength
5 March (for the offensive): 25 divisions; 260,000 men (max); 650 tanks (376 operational); 3,200 assault guns and mortars; 850 aircraft (entire Luftflotte 4 for entire Army Group South)	5 March: 37 divisions (discounting air armies and the Yugoslav 3rd Army); 465,000 men; 407 tanks (398 operational); 6,597 assault guns and mortars; 293 rocket launchers; 965 aircraft (17th Air Army only – 3rd Ukrainian Front)

Casualties and losses
German offensive (6–15 March 1945): Germany: Army Group South: 12,358 men 31 tracked AFVs destroyed 1 APC destroyed; Army Group F: : Soviet counter-offensive (16 March–15 April 1945): 30,000 killed; 125,000 captured; 1,345 tanks/assault guns lost (Note: Many were abandoned due to a lack of fuel.); 2,250 guns and mortars lost; 446 armour personnel carriers; 200+ aircraft	German offensive (6–15 March 1945): 32,899; 8,492 killed or missing; 24,407 wounded & sick; 152 tracked AFVs destroyed; 415 anti-tank guns destroyed; Soviet counter-offensive (16 March–15 April 1945): 38,661 killed; 129,279 wounded & sick; 167,940 overall (including c. 135,000 combat casualties); Bulgarian casualties: 9,805 men; 2,698 killed; 7,017 wounded & sick

Operation Spring Awakening (German: Unternehmen Frühlingserwachen) was the last major German offensive of World War II. The operation was referred to in Germany as the Plattensee Offensive and in the Soviet Union as the Balaton Defensive Operation. It took place in Western Hungary on the Eastern Front and lasted from 6 March until 15 March 1945. The objective was to secure the last significant oil reserves still available to the European Axis powers and prevent the Red Army from advancing towards Vienna. The Germans failed in their objectives.

The operation, initially planned for 5 March, began after German units were moved in great secrecy to the Lake Balaton (Plattensee) area. Many German units were involved, including the 6th Panzer Army and its subordinate Waffen-SS divisions after being withdrawn from the failed Ardennes offensive on the Western Front. The Germans attacked in three prongs: Frühlingserwachen in the Balaton-Lake Velence-Danube area, Eisbrecher south of Lake Balaton, and Waldteufel south of the Drava-Danube triangle. The advance stalled on 15 March, and on 16 March the Red Army and allied units began their delayed Vienna offensive.

== Background ==
On 12 January Hitler received confirmation that the Soviet Red Army had begun a massive winter offensive through Poland, named the Vistula–Oder offensive. Hitler ordered OB West Field Marshal Gerd von Rundstedt to withdraw the following units from active combat in the Battle of the Bulge: I SS Panzer Corps with 1st SS Panzer Division Leibstandarte SS Adolf Hitler (LSSAH) and 12th SS Panzer Division Hitlerjugend, along with II SS Panzer Corps with 2nd SS Panzer Division Das Reich and 9th SS Panzer Division Hohenstaufen. These units were to be refitted by 30 January and attached to the 6th Panzer Army under the command of Sepp Dietrich for the upcoming Operation Spring Awakening. Hitler wanted to secure the extremely vital Nagykanizsa oil fields of southern Hungary, as these were the most strategically valuable assets remaining on the Eastern Front. The deadline of 30 January proved impossible for refitting to be completed.

As Operation Spring Awakening would be of great importance, lengthy preparation and strategic care was taken to preserve the operation's secrecy. But while the 6th Panzer Army was refitting in Germany, Hitler ordered a preliminary offensive with a similar objective to be conducted, resulting in Operation Konrad III beginning 18 January. The objectives of Konrad III included relieving besieged Budapest and the recapturing of the Transdanubia region. By 21 January, only 5 days into Operation Konrad III, the Germans had taken the towns of Dunapentele and Adony which are on the Western shore of the Danube. Their push resulted in the annihilation of the Soviet 7th Mechanized Corps. This sudden and savage push caused the Soviet command to contemplate an evacuation to the opposite shore of the Danube. Before the end of the 4th day, the Germans had recaptured 400 square kilometers of territory, an achievement comparable to the initial German gains during the Ardennes offensive and the Western Front in December 1944. At the height of Operation Konrad III, January 26, the Axis front lines had reached within 20 km of Budapest's southern perimeter, and within about 10 km of the northern perimeter, but their forces were exhausted.

From 27 January through 15 February, the Soviets conducted numerous successful counter-attacks, forcing the Germans to give up the greater portion of their territorial gains, pushing the front line back to the area between Lake Velence, the village of Csősz, and Lake Balaton. This area had the Margit Line running right through it, and would see more fighting in the upcoming Operation Spring Awakening.

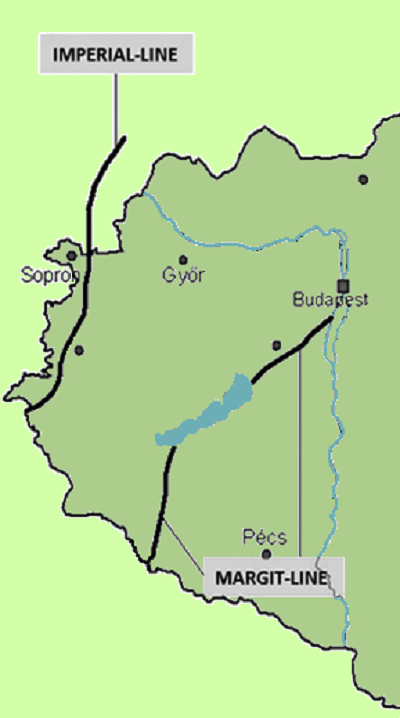
Margit Line in Western Hungary (1944–45)

By mid-February, the Soviet bridgehead across the Garam River north of Esztergom was identified as a threat. This bridgehead would jeopardize the upcoming Spring Awakening's southeastern push past Lake Balaton to secure the southern Hungarian oilfields while also exposing a straight route towards Vienna. Thus, beginning on 17 February, Operation Southwind began the effort to secure the Garam bridgehead from the 2nd Ukrainian Front, and by 24 February the task was successfully achieved, proving to be the very last successful German offensive of the war.

== German plan ==
=== Creation of Operation Spring Awakening ===
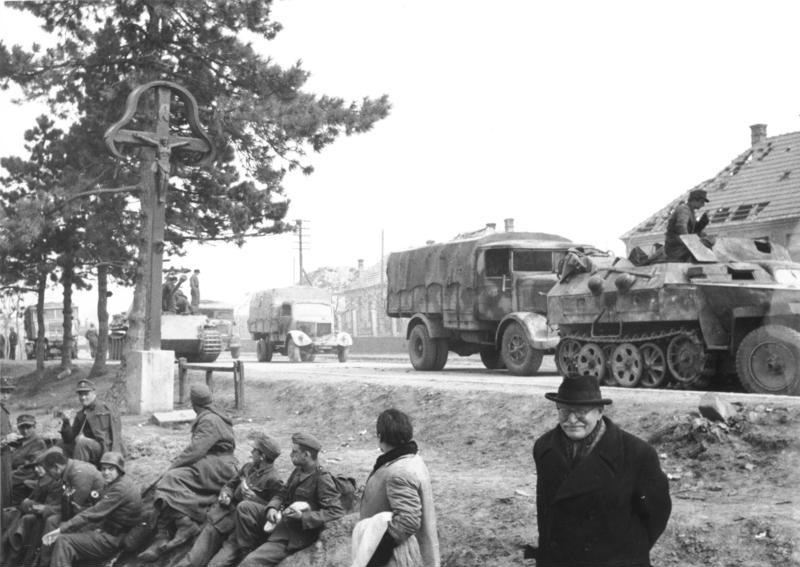
German units during the operation, March 1945

During a Situation Conference on 7 January 1945, at which both Hermann Göring and Rundstedt were present, Hitler proposed his intention of pulling the 6th SS Panzer Army to reserve due to severe Allied air attacks. Rundstedt received the withdrawal orders on January 8, and the Panzer Army's divisions began preparations to withdraw from the stalled Ardennes Offensive. The slow withdrawal was greatly hampered by Allied air superiority.

On 12 January, the Soviet 1st Ukrainian and 1st Belorussian Fronts began their Vistula–Oder offensive with over 2 million men, placing considerable new pressure on the Eastern Front. When this news reached Hitler, he immediately began to plan a major offensive of his own on this Front. Unfortunately, at the time, Hitler's best remaining panzer forces were still engaged on the Western Front. On 20 January, Hitler ordered Rundstedt to withdraw forces from the ongoing Battle of the Bulge; the 1st SS, 2nd SS, and 12th SS Panzer Divisions managed to disengage and withdraw the same day. Almost all support units of the 6th SS Panzer Army were pulled from the Ardennes by 22 January, while the 9th SS Panzer Division was the last to leave on 23 January.

On this same day, 22 January, Hitler committed to send the fatigued 6th SS Panzer Army to Hungary for his new counteroffensive, a view Heinz Guderian (OKH) partially agreed with. Guderian wanted the 6th SS Panzer Army on the Eastern Front, but would have preferred its employment in the defence of Berlin. A glimpse of the ensuing verbal exchange during this argument was captured in Alfred Jodl's (OKW) post-war interrogation, where he quotes Hitler saying: "You want to attack without oil – good, we'll see what happens when you attempt that".

Hitler's reasoning for sending the 6th SS Panzer Army south into Hungary can be understood through the list of main strategic points listed in a Situation in the East conference held on January 23: 1) The Hungarian oil region and Vienna oil region, which made up 80% of remaining reserves, had to be defended and/or retaken, and without which the war effort could not be continued; 2) the defense of the Upper Silesian industrial region, vital for the war economy and coal production. Two quotes illustrate how seriously Hitler viewed this ruling: "Hitler considered the protection of Vienna and Austria as of vital importance and that he would rather see Berlin fall than lose the Hungarian oil area and Austria", "He [Hitler] accepted the risk of the Russian threat to the Oder east of Berlin". Hitler chose to ignore Guderian's view for how the 6th SS Panzer Army should be deployed.

On 27 January, Guderian was tasked by Hitler to stop the 3rd Ukrainian Front in the vicinity of the Margit Line in order to protect the vital oil fields. The following day, 28 January, this operation received its preliminary name, Operation Süd (German: South). The main objectives of the operation were as follows: 1) the security of vital raw materials such as oil, bauxite, and manganese for iron, 2) the defense of arable land for food and crops, the Austrian military industrial complex, and the city of Vienna, and 3) to stop the Soviet advance. Interestingly, an additional side-objective was the hope that the counteroffensive would force the Soviet command to divert some forces from its northern offensives headed to Berlin instead towards Hungary.

Operation Süd was scheduled to start after a path to Budapest had been established. The operation would be considered a success if 1) Operation Konrad III could pin the Soviets between the Vértes mountains and the Danube, 2) the 8th Army could secure its Front in Northern Hungary, and 3) if the incoming panzer armies could be refitted during transit to maintain the element of surprise.

Four plans for Operation Süd were produced by high-ranking officials from Army Group South, the 6th SS Panzer Army, and the 6th Army: "Lösung A" (German: Solution A) by Fritz Krämer of the 6th SS Panzer Army; "Lösung B" and "Lösung C2" by Helmuth von Grolman of Army Group South; and "Lösung C1" by Heinrich Gaedcke of the 6th Army. There was much fighting and bickering as to which plan should be implemented. The commander of Army Group South, Otto Wöhler, chose "Lösung B".

The four plans were sent to Guderian on 22 February for review, and Army Group South informed Army Group F commander Maximilian von Weichs on 23 February that the operation would commence on 5 March, in anticipation that Operation Südwind (German: South Wind) would have finished successfully by 24 February. If Operation Südwind was successful, Operation Süd's start could be deferred by 8 to 9 days. On 25 February, Hitler ordered Wöhler, Weichs, and Dietrich to personally present the plans for Operation Süd to him, along with Guderian and Jodl, at the Reich Chancellery in Berlin, where he ultimately chose "Lösung C2", disagreeing with the commander of Army Group South, Otto Wöhler. Guderian then ordered Wöhler to increase the daily fuel allowance from 400 to 500 cubic meters of fuel on February 26, and by February 28 the specifics of the operation, now officially named "Operation Frühlingserwachen" (Spring Awakening), were completed. As per "Lösung C2", 3 offensive prongs were planned, with the main attack of the 6th Army and 6th SS Panzer Army, "Frühlingserwachen", being directed towards the Danube through Lakes Velence and Balaton; the 2nd Panzer Army's "Eisbrecher" (Icebreaker) attack directed eastward from the western end of Lake Balaton; and the LXXXXI Corps "Waldteufel" (Forest Devil) attack directed north from the Drava River.

=== German military structure ===
OKW was the military command for the German armed forces in WW2, OKH was the high command of the army, subordinate to OKW. Adolf Hitler was the Commander-in-chief of OKH, while also being the supreme commander of OKW. Finding itself issuing more and more direct orders, OKW eventually became responsible for Western and Southern commands, while OKH was responsible for Eastern commands. This operational overlap caused by the centralized command led to disagreements, shortages, waste, inefficiencies, and delays, often escalating to the point where Hitler himself would have to give the final ruling on a matter.

For Operation Spring Awakening, the area for the new offensive was set on the border between OKW (Army Group F) and OKH (Army Group South), and this would cause troubles. Army Group E wanted to assemble its troops north of the Drava River by February 25, but Army Group South was not prepared to start the offensive this early due to Operation Southwind; subsequently, the OKW and Hitler grew more impatient. The chosen course of action on 25 February, "Lösung C2", favored the quicker and farther-reaching joint operation of the 2nd Panzer Army and 6th SS Panzer Army, while "Lösung B" opted to first secure the left flank of the main thrust "Frühlingserwachen" (between Lake Velence and the Danube) before moving south toward the 2nd Panzer Army. Guderian was in favor of "Lösung C2" because this plan would shorten the time the 6th SS Panzer Division would need to stay in Hungary. The OKW and OKH did not use common terminology for parts of the offensive, as OKH referred to the entire offensive as Frühlingserwachen, while OKW referred to the operation attacking north of the Drava as "Waldteufel".

Army Group South and OKH could not agree on how to best utilize the 1st Cavalry Corps. OKH wanted to send the Corps south-west to the 2nd Panzer army, a move Wöhler saw of little use since the 2nd Panzer Army would have a lower chance of success compared to the main attacking thrust of "Frühlingserwachen". Wöhler wanted to use the 1st Cavalry Corps on the eastern shore of Lake Balaton, as German intelligence reported that "the enemy is still the weakest between Lake Balaton and the Sárviz Channel". To further complicate matters, due to the limited number of new trained personnel this late in the war, units under Waffen-SS command were often kept at acceptable capacity by using Wehrmacht personnel. Only 1/3 of the 6th SS Panzer Army's staff were from the Waffen-SS.

=== Arrival into the Hungarian theater ===
When withdrawing from the Western Front, elements of the III. Flak-Korps were tasked with protecting the 6th SS Panzer Army while en route to Zossen south of Berlin. From here the units' possible de-training locations would seem to be the cities along the Oder River, however this was a calculated misinformation measure to confuse enemy forces who actually attacked these cities. The real plan for the units of 6th SS Panzer Army was to travel south through Vienna to their first Hungarian destination, the city of Győr and its surrounding area. Other units from other armies were also sent to the Hungarian theater, for example the 16th SS Panzer Grenadier Division Reichsführer-SS who was brought up from Italy through the Brenner straight and sent to the 2nd Panzer Army. Some units necessary for the major offensive did not arrive in Hungary until just a few days before its start, the last being the 9th SS Panzer Division Hohenstaufen arriving in Győr at the beginning of March. Many of the incoming units also received cover names to help further mask the build-up of forces from the enemy.

Cover Names
Unit	Official name	Cover name
6th SS Panzer Army HQ	HQ	Higher Pioneer Leader Hungary
1st SS Panzer Division	Leibstandarte SS Adolf Hitler	SS replacement unit "Totenkopf"
2nd SS Panzer Division	Das Reich	SS training group North
9th SS Panzer Division	Hohenstaufen	SS training group South
12th SS Panzer Division	Hitlerjugend	SS replacement unit "Wiking"
16th SS Panzer Gren. Division	Reichsführer-SS	13th SS Division replacement group

By 7 February, on orders of Hitler, strict secrecy rulings were put into place: death penalty for command infractions, license plates were to be covered, insignia on vehicles and uniforms to be covered, no reconnaissance in forward combat areas, unit movements only by night or overcast conditions, no radio traffic, and the units were not to appear on situation maps.

Prior to these measures, on 30 January, 1st SS Panzer Division Leibstandarte was ordered to follow many of the same secrecy measures, including the temporary removal of their cuff titles.

=== Objectives of the German forces ===
As per the selected "Lösung C2", the Germans planned to attack Soviet General Fyodor Tolbukhin's 3rd Ukrainian Front. On 27 February, Army Group South hosted a chiefs-of-staff conference to which the chiefs-of-staff of the 2nd Panzer Army, 6th SS Panzer Army, 6th Army, 8th Army, and Luftflotte 4 attended; here the plans for Operation Spring Awakening were laid out. The offensive would consist of four forces, three were to be attack forces while one was to be a defense force. Below are the units under their respective command as discussed on 27 February.

"Frühlingserwachen" Attack Force
Army Group	Commander	Army	Commander	Corps	Commander	Divisions
Army Group South	Otto Wöhler	6th SS Panzer Army	Sepp Dietrich	I SS Panzer Corps	Hermann Priess	1st and 12th SS Panzer Divisions
Army Group South	Otto Wöhler	6th SS Panzer Army	Sepp Dietrich	II SS Panzer Corps	Wilhelm Bittrich	2nd and 9th SS Panzer Divisions, 23rd Panzer Division, 44th Volksgrenadier Division
Army Group South	Otto Wöhler	6th SS Panzer Army	Sepp Dietrich	1st Cavalry Corps		3rd and 4th Cavalry Divisions
Army Group South	Otto Wöhler	6th Army	Hermann Balck	III Panzer Corps	Hermann Breith	1st and 3rd Panzer Divisions, 356th Infantry Division, 25th Hungarian Infantry Division

"Eisbrecher" Attack Force
Army Group	Commander	Army	Commander	Corps	Commander	Divisions
Army Group South	Otto Wöhler	2nd Panzer Army	Maximilian de Angelis	LXVIII Corps	Rudolf Konrad	16th SS Panzergrenadier Division, 71st Infantry Division
Army Group South	Otto Wöhler	2nd Panzer Army	Maximilian de Angelis	XXII Mountain Corps	Hubert Lanz	1st Volksgrenadier Division, 118th Jäger Division (elements)

"Waldteufel" Attack Force
Army Group	Commander	Army	Commander	Corps	Commander	Divisions
Army Group F	Maximilian von Weichs	Army Group E	Alexander Löhr	LXXXXI Corps	Werner von Erdmannsdorff	297th Infantry Division, 104th Jäger Division, 11th Luftwaffe Field Division, 1st Cossack Division,

Defense Force
Army Group	Commander	Army	Commander	Corps	Commander	Divisions
Army Group South	Otto Wöhler	6th Army	Hermann Balck	IV SS Panzer Corps	Herbert Gille	3rd and 5th SS Panzer Divisions, 96th, 711st Infantry Divisions
Army Group South	Otto Wöhler	Third Hungarian Army	József Heszlényi	VIII Corps (Hun.)	Dr Gyula Hankovszky	2nd Hungarian Armoured Division, 1st Hussar Division, 6th Panzer Division, 37th SS Cavalry Division
Army Group South	Otto Wöhler	2nd Panzer Army	Maximilian de Angelis	II Corps (Hun.)	Istvan Kudriczy	20th Hungarian Infantry Division (2-3 Battalions)

On 28 February, the start date for Operation Spring Awakening was finally moved back to 6 March, though many commanders felt that a greater delay was necessary. During the first days of March, alarming reports about road and terrain conditions due to the spring thaw flooded Army Group South Headquarters. Such thaws had previously badly affected 3 other operations in the area: planned Operation Spätlese in December, Operation Southwind, and the "Waldteufel" attack forcing a change of location for the attack bridgehead from Osijek to Donji Miholjac. Despite the start of the operation being so close, some additional plans were thought up to help the sluggish assembly speeds of incoming units. On 3 March, the 6th SS Panzer Army suggested that a naval assault across Lake Balaton itself could be implemented to help the 1st Cavalry Corps on the southeastern edge, but this turned out to be impossible as the spring storms had blown the pack ice against the southern shore. On 5 March, the 6th SS Panzer Army took over command of the Hungarian II Corps, along with its 20th Hungarian Division and 9th replacement Division, hereby becoming responsible for the northern shore of Lake Balaton.

The 6th Panzer Army was responsible for the primary thrust of the offensive, "Frühlingserwachen". It was to advance from an area north of Lake Balaton, through the two lakes (Balaton and Velence), and southeast to capture territory from the Sió Channel to the Danube. After reaching the Danube, one part of the army would turn north creating a northern spearhead and move along the Danube River to retake Budapest, which had been captured on 13 February 1945. Another part of 6th SS Panzer Army would then turn south and create a southern spearhead. The southern spearhead would move along the Sió to link up with units from German Army Group E, which was to thrust north through Mohács. However, the commanding staff of Army Group E was pessimistic about the LXXXXI Corps' ability to reach Mohács due to the unfavorable terrain and sole dependence on infantry. Nonetheless, if successful, it was envisioned that the meeting of Army Group E's "Waldteufel" and the 6th SS Panzer Army's "Frühlingserwachen" would encircle both the Soviet 26th Army and the Soviet 57th Army.

The 6th Army would join the 6th SS Panzer Army in its thrust southeast to the Danube, then turn north to cover the flank of "Frühlingserwachen". The 2nd Panzer Army's "Eisbrecher" would advance from an area southwest of Lake Balaton and progress towards Kaposvár to engage the Soviet 57th Army. All this time, the Hungarian Third Army would hold the area west of Budapest along the Vértes Mountains.

== Soviet preparation ==
=== Interrupted Soviet offensive preparations ===
On 17 February 1945, the Stavka of the Supreme High Command instructed the 2nd and 3rd Ukrainian Fronts to prepare for an offensive towards Vienna which would begin on March 15. However, from 17 to 18 February, the 2nd Ukrainian Front noticed the 1st SS Panzer division Leibstandarte and the 12th SS Panzer division Hitlerjugend fighting at the Garam River during the German Operation Southwind. Knowing that German Panzer divisions were not created for defensive purposes, the Soviet Fronts in Hungary became suspicious of the enemy's intentions. Prisoners taken during Operation Southwind testified that the Germans were in fact preparing to gather a large offensive force. By 20 February, the Soviet fronts in Hungary began to understand what the Germans planned to do. The security of the lands west of the Danube, particularly in the south which held the Hungarian oil fields, was the Germans' main priority at this stage of the war.

=== Soviet defensive preparations ===
As the 2nd Ukrainian Front held the territory of Budapest and the lands north of the Hungarian capital, defensive preparations in this sector were not paid much attention due to the lower likelihood of attack, but this was not the same in the south. 3rd Ukrainian Front marshal Fyodor Tolbukhin ordered his armies to prepare for a German offensive on his entire Front, preparation of which would have to be completed no later then 3 March. To ensure sufficient supply of war materials and fuel, stockpiles were set up on either side of the Danube, a ferry was put into use and additional temporary bridges and gas pipelines were built on the Danube River.

Tolbukhin's plan was to initially slow down the German advance to rob their offensive of momentum, then begin grinding down the attacking armies, then initiate the planned Soviet offensive to finish off the remaining German forces. This plan, along with the strategic deployment of the Soviet forces, was quite similar to that of the Battle of Kursk, although it utilized experiences learned in 1943. The 3rd Ukrainian Front worked on digging in, creating extensive trench networks ideal for anti-tank defenses, along with defensive earthworks for the artillery and infantry. The main differences between the Soviet defenses during the Battle of Kursk and the Balaton defensive operation (the Russian name for Operation Spring Awakening) was the relative short time frame allowed for defensive preparations (half a month), the smaller number of Soviet forces partaking in the defensive, and a reduced focus on perfecting the defensive lines as after all the 3rd Ukrainian Front would need to start its offensive from these lines. Other minor differences included the lack or limited use of barbed wire installations, anti-tank obstacles, and bunkers, although the 4th Guards Army command did suggest placing the burnt out wrecks of 38 previously destroyed German tanks into advantageous positions; it is unclear how many were actually set up.

Tolbukhin's 3rd Ukrainian Front had 5 Armies plus 1 Air Army, in addition it also had the 1st Bulgarian Army with the 3rd Yugoslav Partisan Army also partaking in the defense. The 3rd Ukrainian Front would be set up in a two echelon defensive layout, with the 4th Guards Army, 26th Army, and 57th Army, and the 1st Bulgarian Army in the first echelon, while the 27th Army would be held back in the second echelon for reserve. The 4th Guards Army's three Guards Rifle Corps and one Guards Fortified District would be spread out over a 39 km front and reach 30 km deep, broken into two belts with one behind the other. The 26th Army, which was expected to take the brunt of the German offensive, arranged its three Rifle Corps along a 44 km front but only 10–15 km deep. The 26th Army's Corps' would be layered in two belts whose defensive preparations had originally begun back on 11 February, prior to any sign of German offensive intentions. The 57th Army's one Guards Rifle and one Rifle Corps were spread along a 60 km front and 10–15 km deep; the Army would receive another Rifle Corps during the fighting. The 27th Army's one Guards Rifle and two Rifle Corps would remain in reserve unless the situation in the 26th Army called for its use. Held in reserve, the 3rd Ukrainian Front also had the 18th Tank Corps and 23rd Tanks Corps, along with the 1st Guards Mechanized Corps and the 5th Guards Cavalry Corps. While these Armies were preparing for the imminent offensive, the 17th Air Army was busy flying reconnaissance missions, although they could not report on much due to excellent German camouflage.

Because of the serious tank losses of January–February along the Margit line, Marshal Tolbukhin ordered that no Front/Army level counter-attacks were to take place, and local tactical attacks should be very limited; the only objective was to hold the Front and grind down the German offensive. The two tanks Corps would remain under the 26th and 27th Armies to be utilized only in dire need. The defensive strategy of the 3rd Ukrainian Front was one of anti-tank defense as this was what the Germans were going to use. On average for every kilometer of Front, 700+ anti-tank and 600+ anti-infantry mines were placed, with these numbers rising to 2,700 and 2,900 respectively in the 26th Army's sector. Between the 4th Guards Army and 26th Guards Army, 66 anti-tank zones were created whose depth reached 30–35 km. Each anti-tank position had 8–16 artillery guns and a similar number of anti-tank guns. A prime example of the scale of defensive installments can be seen in the 26th Army's 135th Rifle Corps. Between 18 February and 3 March the 233rd Rifle Division had dug 27 kilometers of trenches, 130 gun and mortar positions, 113 dugouts, 70 command posts and observation points, and laid 4,249 antitank and 5,058 antipersonnel mines, all this on a frontage of 5 kilometers. Although there were no tanks in this defensive zone, there was an average of 17 anti-tank guns per kilometer forming 23 tank killing grounds.

=== Soviet military structure ===
The Soviet forces, contrary to the Germans, did not have such odd structural complications as the Soviet armies could make independent decisions while the Stavka could intervene when asked or if necessary; a much more straightforward military structure with clear boundaries. This is an example of a de-centralized command. It was not uncommon for the Soviets to actually search out and exploit the boundaries between the OKW and OKH as they knew these areas would suffer from poorer military command; the advance to Budapest is an example.

== Order of battle for 6–15 March 1945 ==
These are the main units that were a part of the Army Groups/Front which saw combat in Operation Spring Awakening. Please note that the units below are subordinate to the commanding structure under which they spent the most time during the offensive. Units during the final months of the war were very prone to location reassignments as the front situation evolved. Reserve units are not included in the list.

(Nazi Germany) German Forces – Army Group South
- 6th Army (Army Group Balck)
  - III Panzer Corps
    - 1st Panzer Division
      - I./Pz.Rgt 24 (Panther Ausf. G, e.g. No. 121 at Börgönd)
      - Pz.Art.Rgt 73 (Pz.IV, Pz.Beob.Wg.IV)
    - 3rd Panzer Division
      - Pz.Rgt 6 (Panther Ausf. G, e.g. No. 200, Pz.IV, e.g. No. 723)
      - Pz.Art.Rgt 75 (Pz.Beob.Wg. III, Wespe, e.g. No. 508, 510)
    - 6th Panzer Division
    - s.Pz.Abt 509 (Tiger II.)
    - Sturm.Pz.Abt. 219 (Brummbär)
    - 356th Infantry Division
  - IV SS Panzer Corps
    - 3rd SS Panzer Division Totenkopf
      - SS-Pz.Rgt 3 (Panther Ausf. G, Pz.IV, Tiger I.)
        - SS-Pz.Jg.Abt 3 (Pz.IV L/70(V)
    - Heers-Sturm. Art. Brig. 303 (StuG III, e.g. No. 3202, 3212 at Lake Balaton-E)
    - 5th SS Panzer Division Wiking
      - SS-Pz.Rgt 5 (Panther Ausf. A, -D, Pz.IV Ausf. J, StuG.IV)
- 6th SS Panzer Army
  - Beute-Pz. Verband Jaguar (captured T-34/85, e.g. -in diamond- No. A/99)
  - I SS Panzer Corps
    - 1st SS Panzer Division Leibstandarte Adolf Hitler
      - SS-Pz.Rgt 1 (Panther Ausf. G, e.g. No. 121, 212, 213, Pz.IV Ausf. J)
        - SS-Pz.Jg.Abt 1 (Pz.IV L/70(V)
        - s.SS-Pz.Abt 501 (Tiger II.)
    - 12th SS Panzer Division Hitlerjugend
      - SS-Pz.Rgt 12 (Panther Ausf. G, Pz.IV Ausf. J, Flakpanzer IV 'Wirbelwind')
        - SS-Pz.Jg.Abt 12 (Pz.IV/L70)
        - s.H.Pz.Jg.Abt 560 (Jagdpanther, e.g. No. 102 at Tés)
    - 25th Hungarian Infantry Division
      - 20th Royal Hungarian Sturm. Artillery (Jagdpanzer 38(t) Hetzer, e.g. K-022, K-025 at Balatonszabadi)
  - II SS Panzer Corps
    - 2nd SS Panzer Division Das Reich
      - SS-Pz.Rgt 2 (Panther Ausf. G, Pz.IV Ausf. J, StuG III.)
    - 9th SS Panzer Division Hohenstaufen
      - SS-Pz.Rgt 9 (Panther Ausf. G, e.g. AJ9 at Vilonya, Pz.IV, StuG III., StuG 40 Ausf. G, e.g. No. 712 at Devecser)
    - 23rd Panzer Division
      - Pz.Rgt 23 (Panther, Pz.IV, JPz.IV/L70(A), e.g. No. 454 at Szentkirályszabadja)
      - Pz.Jg.Abt 128 (Pz.IV/70(V)
    - 44th Volksgrenadier Division Reichsgrenadier-Division Hoch- und Deutschmeister
  - I Cavalry Corps (Mainly horses)
    - 3rd Cavalry Division
      - Pz.Jg.Abt 69 (StuH 42)
    - 4th Cavalry Division
- 2nd Panzer Army
  - LXVIII Corps
    - 1st Gebirgs Division
    - 13th Waffen-Gebirds der SS Division Handschar
    - 16th SS Panzer Grenadier Division Reichsführer-SS
    - 71st Infantry Division
  - XXII Gebirgs Corps
    - 2nd Hungarian Tank Division
    - 118th Jäger Division
- Luftflotte 4
  - II./JG 51 (Bf 109G)
  - II./JG 52 (Bf 109G)
  - I./JG 53 (Bf 109G, Bf 108)
  - I, III./SG 2 (Fw 190F, Ju 87G – 10.(Pz)/SG 2)
  - I, II, III./SG 10 (Fw 190F/G)
  - I./NSGr 5 (Go 145A, Ar 66D)
  - I./NSGr 10 (Ju 87D)
  - I./NAGr 14 (Bf 109G)
  - Stab/JG 76
    - JGr.101 – Royal Hungarian Air Force (Bf 109G, Fi 156)
    - 102 – Royal Hungarian Air Force (Fw 190F)

Army Group E – subordinate to Army Group F until March 25, 1945

- LXXXXI Corps
  - 1st Cossack Division
  - 11th Luftwaffe Field Division
  - 104th Jäger Division
  - 297th Infantry Division
(Soviet Union) Soviet Forces – 3rd Ukrainian Front
- Independent Separate Units (Temporarily transferred from other Fronts)
  - 209th Self-prop. Artillery Brigade
    - 1951st Self-prop. Artillery Regiment (SU-100, markings: 4xx, e.g. white 415 (Chassis No.: 41195)
    - 1952nd Self-prop. Artillery Regiment (SU-100, markings: 4xx)
    - 1953rd Self-prop. Artillery Regiment (SU-100, markings: 4xx, e.g. white 480 (Chassis No.: 41184)
    - Separate Recce. Company (T48/SU-57, e.g. U.S.A. 4021593 and Harley-Davidson 42WLA motorcycle, e.g. U.S.A. 679183 at Simontornya)
- 4th Guards Army
  - 20th Guards Rifle Corps
    - 5th Guards Airborne Division
      - 13th Guards Airborne Self-prop. Artillery Battalion (SU-76M)
    - 7th Guards Airborne Division
    - 80th Guards Rifle Division
      - 85th Guards Self-prop. Artillery Battalion (SU-76M)
    - 84th Rifle Division
      - 122nd Separate Self-prop. Artillery Battalion (SU-76M)
  - 21st Guards Rifle Corps
    - 7th Guards Airborne Division
      - 8th Separate Guards Air-landing Self-prop. Artillery Battalion (SU-76M)
    - 41st Guards Rifle Division
      - 44th Guards Self-prop. Artillery Battalion (SU-76M)
    - 62nd Guards Rifle Division
      - 69th Guards Self-prop. Artillery Battalion (SU-76M, e.g. No. 140, 142)
    - 69th Guards Rifle Division
      - 75th Guards Self-prop. Artillery Battalion (SU-76M)
    - 252nd Rifle Division
      - 310th Separate Self-prop. Artillery Battalion (SU-76M)
  - 31st Guards Rifle Corps
    - 4th Guards Rifle Division
    - 34th Guards Rifle Division
    - 40th Guards Rifle Division
  - 23rd Tank Corps
    - 3rd Tank Brigade (T-34/85, markings: B -in diamond- and xx, e.g. white, new B 28 / old B-143 at Tükröspuszta)
    - 39th Tank Brigade (T-34/85, markings: Г -in diamond- and xx, e.g. white Г 67 at Bőnyrétalap)
    - 135th Tank Brigade (T-34/85, markings: Д -in diamond- and xx, e.g. white Д 56)
    - 207th Self-prop. Artillery Brigade
      - 912nd Self-prop. Artillery Regiment (SU-100, ~ e.g. red Г-146 in Vienna)
      - 1004th Self-Prop. Artillery Regiment (SU-100)
      - 1011th Self-Prop. Artillery Regiment (SU-100)
    - 56th Mechanized Brigade
    - 1443rd Self-prop. Artillery Regiment (ISU-122)
    - 366th Guards Heavy Self-prop. Artillery Regiment (ISU-152, captured Hummels, e.g. white No. 51*, 53* near Balatonaliga)
- 26th Army
  - 30th Rifle Corps
    - 21st Rifle Division
    - 36th Guards Rifle Division
    - 68th Guards Rifle Division
    - 155th Rifle Division
    - 1202nd Self-prop. Artillery Regiment (SU-76M, No. 411083, 411662)
  - 104th Rifle Corps
    - 66th Guards Rifle Division
      - 22nd Separate Training Tank Regiment (T-34, and a single, old KV-1S)
    - 93rd Rifle Division
    - 151st Rifle Division
  - 135th Rifle Corps
    - 74th Rifle Division
    - 233rd Rifle Division
    - 236th Rifle Division
  - 18th Tank Corps
    - 110th Tank Brigade (T-34/85, markings: 4xx, e.g. red 408, Chassis No.: 412085)
    - 170th Tank Brigade (T-34/85, markings: 5xx, e.g. red 545, Chassis No.: 4121591)
    - 181st Tank Brigade (T-34/85, markings: 6xx, e.g. red 667, Chassis No.: 4121023)
    - 32nd Guards Mechanical Brigade
      - 52nd Separate Tank Regiment (T-34)
    - 208th Self-prop. Artillery Brigade
      - 1016th Self-prop. Artillery Regiment (SU-100)
      - 1068th Self-prop. Artillery Regiment (SU-100)
      - 1922nd Self-prop. Artillery Regiment (SU-100, markings: C-xx, e.g. red C-47, Chassis No.: 411101)
    - 363rd Guards Heavy Self-prop. Artillery Regiment (Markings: Battery No., 0, Gun No. For example: ISU-122S, No. 303, Chassis No.: 41222, or ISU-152, No. 401, Chassis No.: 41264)
    - 78th Separate Mechanized Motorcycle Battalion (T-34, motorcycles)
    - 1438th Self-prop. Artillery Regiment (SU-76M, e.g. white B-946, Chassis No.: 411591)
    - 1694th Anti Aircraft Artillery Regiment (M-17 halftrack)
- 27th Army
  - 35th Guards Rifle Corps
    - 3rd Guards Airborne Division
    - 78th Rifle Division
    - 163rd Rifle Division
  - 37th Guards Rifle Corps
    - 108th Rifle Division
    - 316th Rifle Division
    - 320th Rifle Division
  - 1st Guards Fortified District
  - 1st Guards Mechanized Corps
    - 1st Guards Mechanized Brigade (BA-64, M3A1 Scout Car, e.g. white 146, Chassis No.: U.S.A. 6089987)
      - 18th Guards Tank Regiment (M4A2(76)W Sherman, markings: '1xx', e.g. white 139 (Chassis No.: U.S.A. 3080899)
    - 2nd Guards Mechanized Brigade (BA-64, e.g. white No. 249)
      - 19th Guards Tank Regiment (M4A2(76)W Sherman, markings: '2xx', e.g. white 223 (Chassis No.: U.S.A. 3080689)
    - 3rd Guards Mechanized Brigade (BA-64, e.g. Chassis No.: 74566)
      - 20th Guards Tank Regiment (M4A2(76)W Sherman, markings: '3xx' (e.g. Chassis No.: U.S.A. 3080508)
    - 9th Guards Tank Brigade (M4A2(76)W Sherman, markings: '9xx', e.g. white 959 (Chassis No.: U.S.A. 30116426)
    - 382nd Self-prop. Artillery Regiment (SU-100)
    - 1453rd Self-prop. Artillery Regiment (SU-100)
    - 1821st Self-prop. Artillery Regiment (SU-100, markings: 6xx, e.g. white No. 603 in Vienna)
    - 11th Guards Separate Motorcycle Battalion
- 57th Army
  - 6th Guards Rifle Corps
    - 10th Guards Airborne Rifle Division
    - 20th Guards Rifle Division
    - 61st Guards Rifle Division
  - 64th Rifle Corps
    - 73rd Guards Rifle Division
    - 113th Rifle Division
    - 299th Rifle Division
      - 864th Self-prop. Artillery Regiment (SU-76M)
    - 1201st Self-prop. Artillery Regiment (SU-76M)
  - 3rd Guards Motorcycle Regiment
  - 53rd Motorcycle Regiment
  - 5th Guards Cavalry Corps
    - 11th Guards Cavalry Division (71st Tank Regiment: T-34, M4A2(75)W Sherman)
    - 12th Guards Cavalry Division (54th Tank Regiment: T-34)
    - 63rd Cavalry Division (60th Guards Tank regiment: M3 Lee, Valentine Mk. IX., e.g. white No. 213, 221, 231, 232)
    - 1896th Self-prop. Artillery Regiment (SU-76M)
- 17th Air Army
  - 136th Ground Attack Air Division
    - 210th Ground Attack Regiment (IL-2m3 Sturmovik) – 1 long diagonal tail stripe, e.g. IL-2m3, No. 35, S/N: 11926
    - 715th Ground Attack Regiment (IL-2m3 Sturmovik) – 1 long, 1 short diagonal tail stripe, e.g. IL-2m3, No. 31, S/N: 18819118
    - 989th Ground Attack Regiment (IL-2m3 Sturmovik) – 1 long, 2 short diagonal tail stripes, e.g. IL-2m3, No. 19, S/N: 10586
  - 189th Ground Attack Air Division
    - 615th Ground Attack Regiment (IL-2m3 Sturmovik), e.g. IL-2m3, No. 35, S/N: 10807
    - 639th Ground Attack Regiment (IL-2m3 Sturmovik), e.g. IL-2m3, S/N: 1889403
    - 707th Ground Attack Regiment (IL-2m3 Sturmovik), e.g. IL-2m3, No. 1, S/N: 18825124
  - 306th Ground Attack Air Division
    - 672nd Ground Attack Regiment (IL-2m3 Sturmovik) – White diagonal tail-cap, e.g. IL-2m3, No. 18, S/N: 1875788
    - 951st Ground Attack Regiment (IL-2m3 Sturmovik) – White diagonal tail-cap with 1 short diagonal stripe, e.g. IL-2m3, No. 210, S/N: 1874898
  - 10th Guards Ground Attack Air Division
    - 165th Guards Ground Attack Regiment (IL-2m3 Sturmovik)
    - 166th Guards Ground Attack Regiment (IL-2m3 Sturmovik)
    - 167th Guards Ground Attack Regiment (IL-2m3 Sturmovik)
  - 194th Fighter Air Division
    - 56th Fighter Air Regiment (La-5F, La-5FN)
    - 530th Fighter Air Regiment (La-5F, La-5FN)
    - 848th Fighter Air Regiment (La-5F, La-5FN)
  - 236th Fighter Air Division
    - 267th Fighter Air Regiment (Yak-1b,-3,-9)
    - 117th Guards Fighter Air Regiment (Yak-1b,-9)
    - 168th Guards Fighter Air Regiment (Yak-1b,-9)
  - 288th Fighter Air Division (HQ: Yak-3)
    - 611th Fighter Air Regiment (Yak-1b,-3,-9D, DD, M) – White diagonal tail stripe with a wide bar on the rudder
    - 659th Fighter Air Regiment (Yak-3, -9D, DD, M, T) – Long white arrow on fuselage
    - 866th Fighter Air Regiment (Yak-3)
    - 897th Fighter Air Regiment (Yak-1b,-3,-9D, DD, M, T)
  - 295th Fighter Air Division
    - 31st Fighter Air Regiment (La-5F, La-5FN,-7FN) – Lightning bolt on fuselage, diagonal tail stripe
    - 116th Fighter Air Regiment (La-5F, La-5FN) – Lightning bolt on fuselage, diagonal tail stripes
    - 164th Fighter Air Regiment (La-5F, La-5FN) – Lightning bolt on fuselage, diagonal tail stripes
  - 244th Bomber Air Division (Douglas A-20 Boston)
    - 260th Bomber Air Regiment (A-20B, C, G, J, UA-20C Boston) – Lightning emblem on the nose
    - 449th Bomber Air Regiment (A-20B, C, G UA-20C Boston) – Bomb dropping seagull emblem on the nose
    - 861st Bomber Air Regiment (A-20B, C, G, J UA-20C Boston)
  - 262nd Night Bomber Air Division
    - 370th Night Bomber Air Regiment (Po-2)
    - 371st Night Bomber Air Regiment (Po-2)
    - 993rd Night Bomber Air Regiment (Po-2)
    - 97th Guards Night Bomber Air Regiment (Po-2)
  - 39th Separate Air Reconnaissance Regiment (Pe-2R, Yak-9D, M, R)
- 5th Air Army (Units involved, due to temporary bad weather/fog over some 17th Air Army airfields. Pulled from 2nd Ukrainian Front.)
  - 7th Guards Ground Attack Air Division
    - 130th Guards Ground Attack Regiment (IL-2m3 Sturmovik)
    - 131st Guards Ground Attack Regiment (IL-2m3 Sturmovik)
  - 12th Guards Ground Attack Air Division
    - 187th Guards Ground Attack Regiment (IL-2m3 Sturmovik)
    - 188th Guards Ground Attack Regiment (IL-2m3 Sturmovik)
    - 190th Guards Ground Attack Regiment (IL-2m3 Sturmovik)
  - 264th Ground Attack Air Division
    - 235st Ground Attack Regiment (IL-2m3 Sturmovik) – white tail cap
    - 451st Ground Attack Regiment (IL-2m3 Sturmovik)
  - 279th Fighter Air Division
    - 92nd Fighter Air Regiment (La-5)
    - 192nd Fighter Air Regiment (La-5)
    - 486th Fighter Air Regiment (La-5)
  - 6th Guards Fighter Air Division
    - 31st Guards Fighter Air Regiment (Yak-1b, -9)
    - 73rd Guards Fighter Air Regiment (Yak-1b, -9)
    - 85th Guards Fighter Air Regiment (Yak-1b, -9)
  - 14th Guards Fighter Air Division
    - 177th Guards Fighter Air Regiment (La-5)
    - 178th Guards Fighter Air Regiment (La-5)
    - 179th Guards Fighter Air Regiment (La-7)
  - 218th Bomber Air Division
    - 48th Bomber Air Regiment (A-20G Boston) – red tail cap
    - 452nd Bomber Air Regiment (A-20G Boston) – white tail cap
    - 453rd Bomber Air Regiment (A-20G Boston) – dark blue tail cap
- 18th Air Army (Unit involved, bombers operated at night. Pulled from former soviet long-range air force.)
  - 15th Guards Bomber Air Division
    - 14th Guards Bomber Air Regiment (B-25D, J Mitchell)
    - 238th Guards Bomber Air Regiment (B-25D, J Mitchell)
    - 251st Guards Bomber Air Regiment (B-25D, J Mitchell)
  - 53rd Bomber Air Division (Li-2 cargo planes, etc.)
- 1st Bulgarian Army
  - 3rd Army Corps
    - 8th Infantry Division
    - 10th Infantry Division
    - 12th Infantry Division
  - 4th Army Corps
    - 3rd Infantry Division
    - 11th Infantry Division
    - 16th Infantry Division
    - 1st Separate Tank Battalion (Pz.IV Ausf. H)
- 3rd Army (Yugoslav Partisans)
  - 12th Army Corps
    - 16th Infantry Division
    - 51st Infantry Division

== German offensive ==
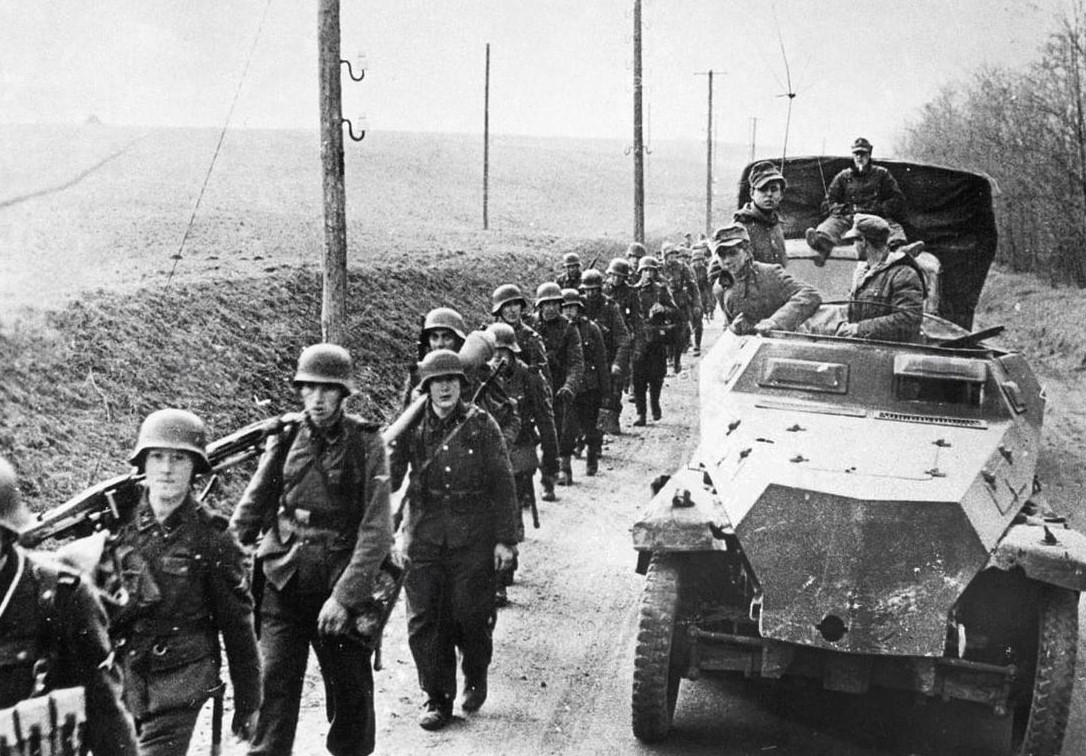
German troops at the beginning of Operation Spring Awakening

The offensive units did not start in unison owing to complications, thus the units of the 6th SS Panzer Army began their attack at 04:00 while the 2nd SS Panzer Corps attacked at 18:30. On the 6 March 1945, the German 6th Army, joined by the 6th SS Panzer Army launched a pincer movement north and south of Lake Balaton. Ten armoured (Panzer) and five infantry divisions, including a large number of new heavy Tiger II tanks, struck 3rd Ukrainian Front, hoping to reach the Danube and link up with the German 2nd Panzer Army forces attacking south of Lake Balaton. The attack was spearheaded by the 6th SS Panzer Army and included once elite units such as the 1st SS Panzer Division Leibstandarte SS Adolf Hitler, by now seriously degraded from constant fighting and heavy losses. Dietrich's army made "good progress" at first, but as they drew near the Danube, the combination of the muddy terrain and strong Soviet resistance had ground the German advance to a halt.

On 10 March, the Axis forces fighting under Operation Spring Awakening around Lake Balaton had a total of 230 operational tanks and 167 operational assault guns between their 17 divisions. A single fully equipped late 1944 Panzer division would officially have held no fewer than 136 tanks, meaning that by 10 March the entire offensive immediately surrounding Lake Balaton had enough tanks for only 1.7 Panzer divisions as opposed to the 11 which were in action.

By the 14 March, Operation Spring Awakening was at risk of failure. The 6th SS Panzer Army was well short of its goals. The 2nd Panzer Army did not advance as far on the southern side of Lake Balaton as the 6th SS Panzer Army had on the northern side. Army Group E met fierce resistance from the Bulgarian First Army and Josip Broz Tito's Yugoslav Partisans, and failed to reach its objective of Mohács. German losses were heavy. Heeresgruppe Süd lost 15,117 casualties in the first eight days of the offensive.

On the 15 March, strength returns on this day show the Hohenstaufen Division with 35 Panther tanks, 20 Panzer IVs, 32 Jagdpanzers, 25 Sturmgeschützes and 220 other self-propelled weapons and armoured cars. 42% of these vehicles were damaged, under short or long-term repair. The Das Reich Division had 27 Panthers, 22 Panzer IVs, 28 Jagdpanzers and 26 Sturmgeschützes on hand (the number of those under repair is not available).

== Soviet counterattack – Vienna offensive ==
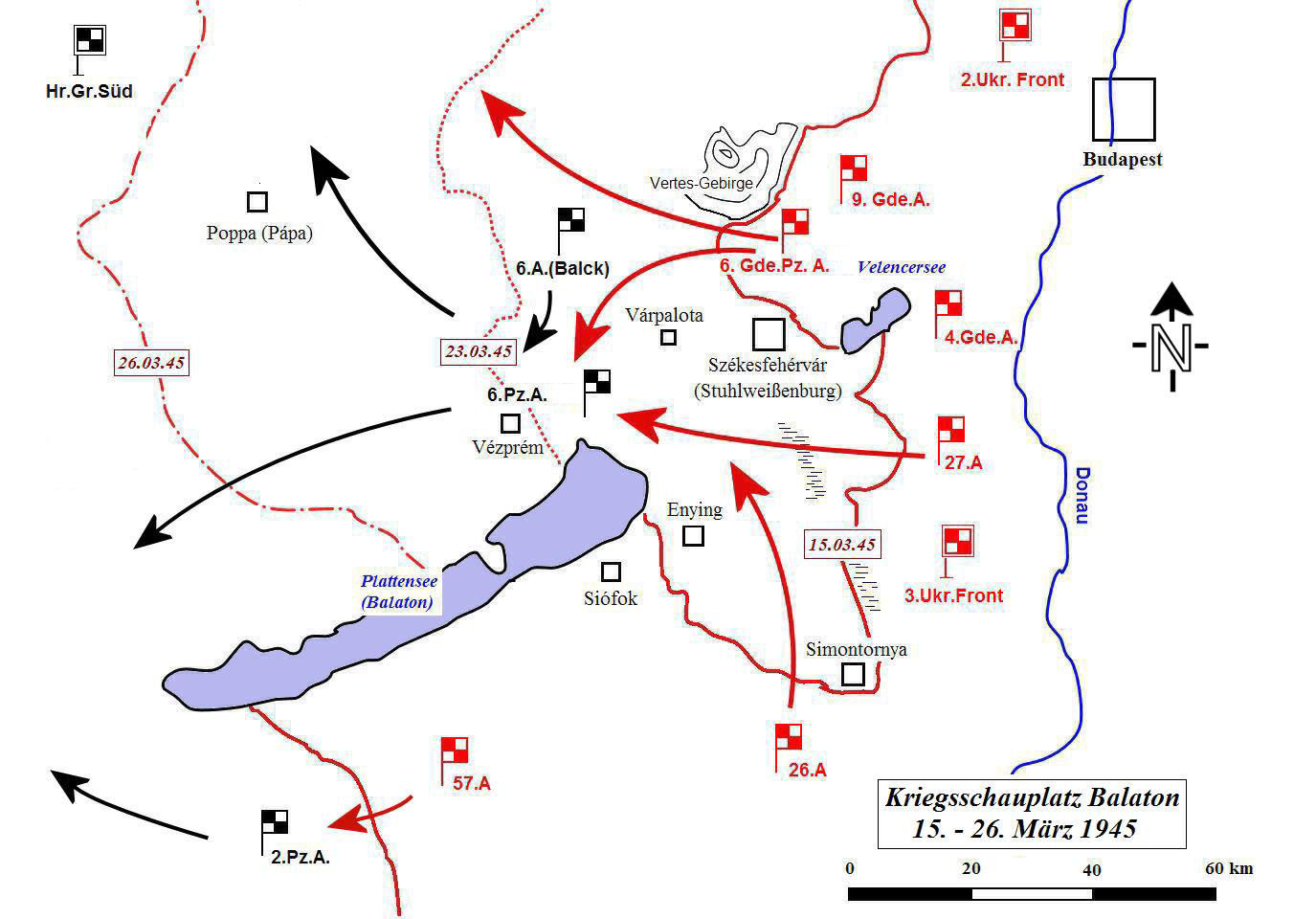
Soviet counterattack

On 16 March, the Soviets forces counterattacked in strength. The Germans were driven back to the positions they had held before Operation Spring Awakening began. The overwhelming numerical superiority of the Red Army made any defense impossible, but Hitler believed victory was attainable.

On 22 March, the remnants of the 6th SS Panzer Army withdrew towards Vienna. By 30 March, the Soviet 3rd Ukrainian Front crossed from Hungary into Austria. By 4 April, the 6th SS Panzer Army was already in the Vienna area desperately setting up defensive lines against the anticipated Soviet Vienna offensive. Approaching and encircling the Austrian capital were the Soviet 4th and 6th Guards Tank, 9th Guards, and 46th Armies.

The Soviet's Vienna Offensive ended with the fall of the city on 13 April. By 15 April, the remnants of the 6th SS Panzer Army were north of Vienna, facing the Soviet 9th Guards and 46th Armies. By 15 April, the depleted German 6th Army was north of Graz, facing the Soviet 26th and 27th Armies. The remnants of the German 2nd Panzer Army were south of Graz in the Maribor area, facing the Soviet 57th Army and the Bulgarian First Army. Between 25 April and 4 May, the 2nd Panzer Army was attacked near Nagykanizsa during the Nagykanizsa–Körmend offensive.

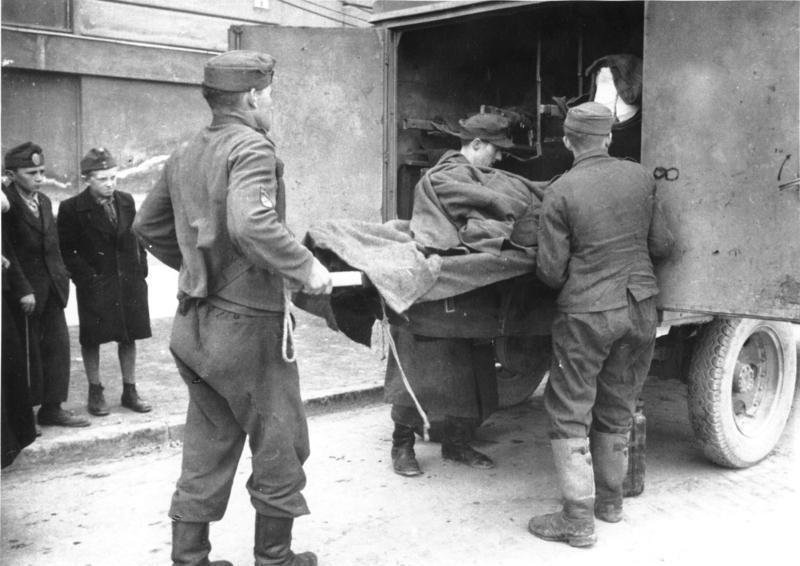
German casualties

Some Hungarian units survived the fall of Budapest and the destruction which followed when the Soviets counterattacked after Operation Spring Awakening. The Hungarian Szent László Infantry Division was still indicated to be attached to the German 2nd Panzer Army as late as 30 April. Between 16 and 25 March, the Hungarian Third Army had been destroyed about 40 kilometres (25 mi) west of Budapest by the Soviet 46th Army which was driving towards Bratislava and the Vienna area.

On 19 March, the Red Army recaptured the last territories lost during the 13‑day Axis offensive. Sepp Dietrich, commander of the Sixth SS Panzer Army tasked with defending the last sources of petroleum controlled by the Germans, joked that "6th Panzer Army is well named—we have just six tanks left."

== Armband order ==
The failure of the operation resulted in the "armband order" that was issued by Hitler to Dietrich, who claimed that the troops, and more importantly, the Leibstandarte, "did not fight as the situation demanded." As a mark of disgrace, the Waffen-SS units involved in the battle were ordered to remove their cuff titles. Dietrich did not relay the order to his troops, because the order had already been partially previously completed as cuff tiles were already removed from the uniforms as per a secrecy measure ordered on 30 January 1945, and there was no need to further disgrace his men beyond the fatal loss they had just suffered.

== Trophy tanks ==
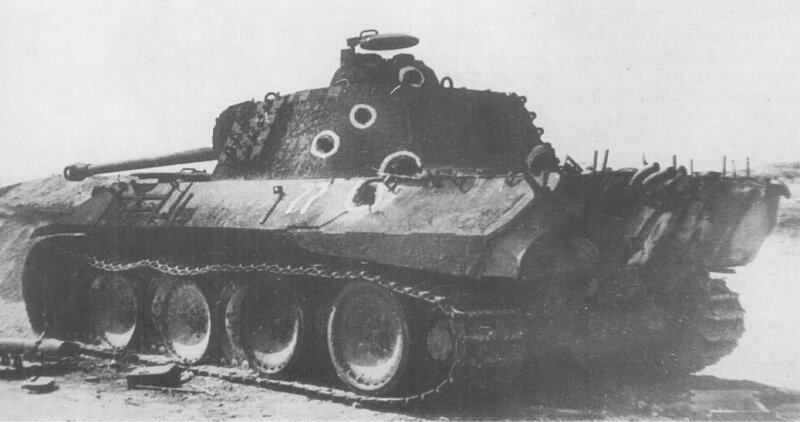
Panther in Hungary – Spring 1945 – trophy number 77

After new territory had been captured, Soviet collection teams scoured the countryside and towns to document and photograph knocked out Axis vehicles and tanks. This was an effort to document not only the sudden buildup of Axis forces and to gain intelligence, but also an opportunity to assess the quality of their opponent's technology. Four main commissions were formed by the HQ of the artillery of the 3rd Ukrainian Front, the 17th Air Army, the 9th Guards Army, and the 18th Tank corps. Hundreds of tanks and armored fighting vehicles were documented.

== See also ==
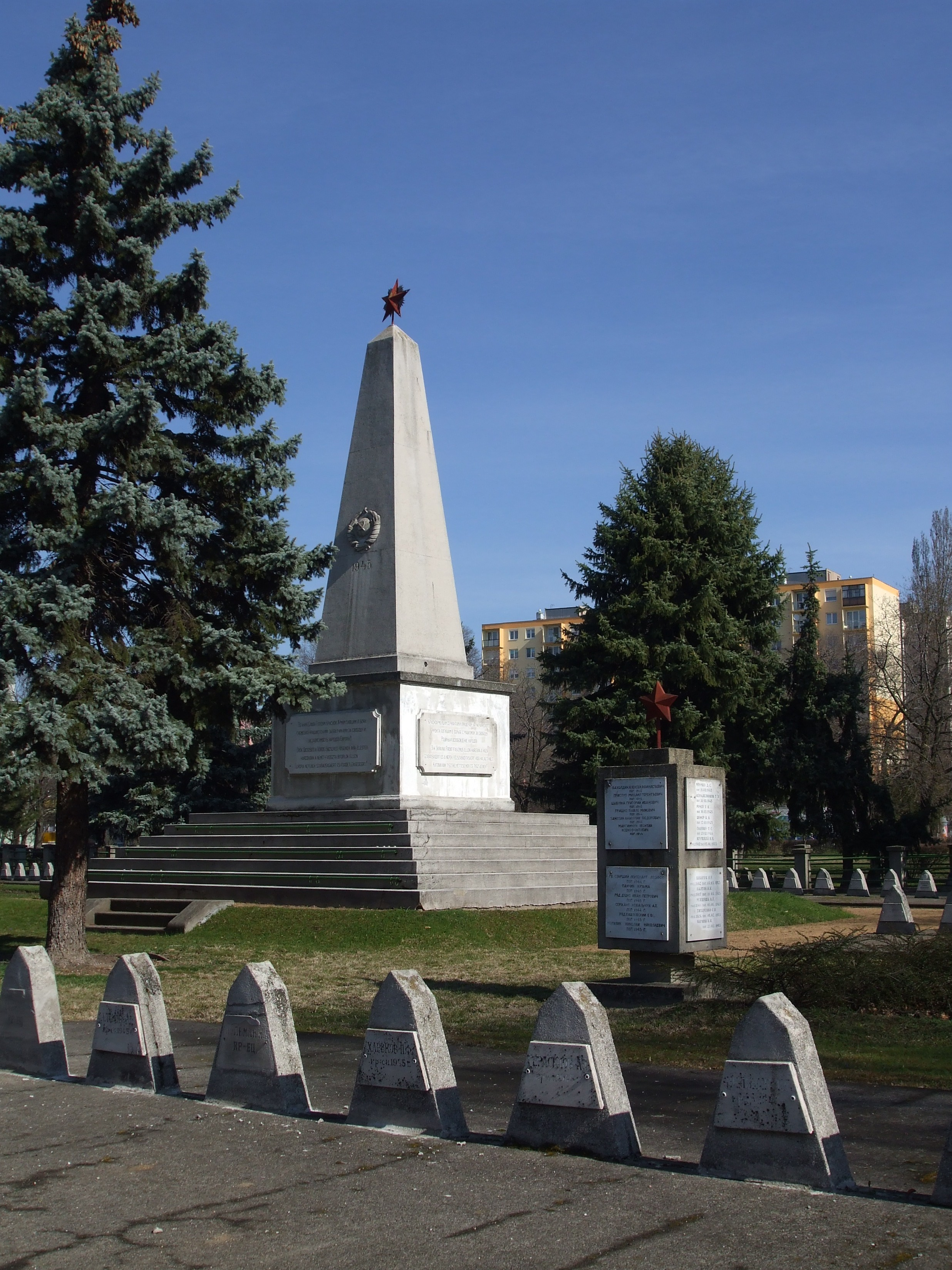
Soviet memorial today in Székesfehérvár

- Hungary during the Second World War
- Battle of Budapest (1944/45)
- Battle of the Transdanubian Hills (1945)
- History of Germany during World War II
- Military history of Bulgaria during World War II
- Prague Offensive (1945)
