= Panzer Corps Feldherrnhalle =

- Divisional insignia of Panzergrenadier-Division Feldherrnhalle
- Active: 1944–45
- Country: Nazi Germany
- Branch: Army
- Type: Panzer; Panzergrenadier; Infantry
- Role: Armoured warfare
- Size: Corps
- Garrison/HQ: HQ Berlin
- Engagements: World War II: Battle of Debrecen; Siege of Budapest; Operation Spring Awakening

Commanders
- November 27, 1944 – May 8, 1945: General der Panzertruppe Ulrich Kleemann

The Panzerkorps Feldherrnhalle was a German army corps (panzer corps) that fought on the Eastern Front during the Second World War. It was formed of Sturmabteilung (SA) members. Unlike the Waffen-SS, Feldherrenhalle operated under the Wehrmacht Heer.

== History ==
The Panzerkorps Feldherrnhalle was formed on 27 November 1944 by redesignating IV. Armeekorps which had been destroyed on the Eastern Front in August during the Soviet Second Jassy–Kishinev Offensive, Its corps units came from Sturm-Division "Rhodos" ("Assault division 'Rhodes'") and Panzer-Grenadier-Brigade 17. The corps was first deployed in Hungary in February 1945.

The Panzerkorps surrendered to the US Army at the end of the war.

The SA-Feldherrnhalle standard

== Commanders ==
=== Panzerkorps Feldherrnhalle ===
Commanding officers
Rank	Name	Period
General der Panzertruppe	Ulrich Kleemann	27 November 1944 to 8 May 1945 (162 days)

== Orders of battle ==
Battle of Debrecen, Hungary, October 1944
As "60th Panzergrenadier-Division Feldherrnhalle"

- Division Stab
- Füsilier-Regiment Feldherrnhalle
- Grenadier-Regiment Feldherrnhalle
- Panzer-Abteilung Feldherrnhalle
- Panzer-Aufklärungs-Abteilung Feldherrnhalle
- Artillerie Regiment Feldherrnhalle
- FlaK-Bataillon Feldherrnhalle
- Pionier-Bataillon Feldherrnhalle
- Nachrichten-Kompanie Feldherrnhalle

Budapest, Hungary, February 1945
As Panzer-Division Feldherrnhalle 1

- Division Stab
- Panzer-Regiment Feldherrnhalle
  - Panzer-Battalion
  - Panzergrenadier-Battalion (half-track)
  - schwere Panzer-Abteilung Feldherrnhalle
- Panzergrenadier-Regiment Feldherrnhalle
- Panzerjäger-Abteilung Feldherrnhalle
- Panzer-Aufklärungs-Abteilung Feldherrnhalle
- Pionier-Bataillon Feldherrnhalle
- Artillerie-Regiment Feldherrnhalle
- Nachrichten-Kompanie Feldherrnhalle

Operation Spring Awakening, Hungary, March 1945
As Panzerkorps Feldherrnhalle

- Korps Stab
  - Korps-Füsilier-Regiment Feldherrnhalle
  - Schwere-Panzer-Abteilung Feldherrnhalle
  - 404. Artillerie-Regiment
  - 404. Panzer-Pionier-Bataillon
  - 44. Panzer-Nachrichten-Bataillon
  - Panzer-Feldersatz-Regiment Feldherrnhalle
- Panzer-Division Feldherrnhalle 1
- Panzer-Division Feldherrnhalle 2
