= Battle of the Transdanubian Hills =

1945 battle of WWII between Bulgaria and Nazi Germany

- Part of World War II
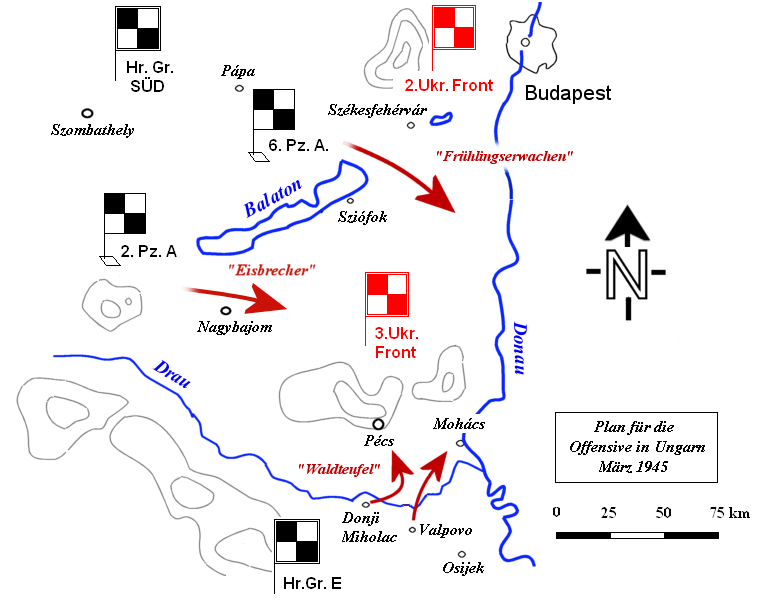
- Planned German attacks for Operation Spring Awakening
Date	6–21 March 1945
Location	Drava river valley and Transdanubian Hills
Result	Allied victory

Belligerents
Bulgaria; Soviet Union; Yugoslavia	Germany

Commanders and leaders
(Tsardom of Bulgaria (1908–1946)) Vladimir Stoychev (Soviet Union) Mikhail Sharokhin (Democratic Federal Yugoslavia) Kosta Nađ	(Nazi Germany) Maximilian de Angelis (Nazi Germany) Werner von Erdmannsdorff

Units involved
Bulgarian 1st Army; Soviet 57th Army; Yugoslav 3rd Army	2nd Panzer Army; LXXXXI Corps

Strength
	2nd Panzer Army; LXXXXI Corps

Casualties and losses
2,500	10,000

Unit locations on 6 March 1945
Red - Soviet forces, Orange - Yugoslav forces, Green - Bulgarian forces, Grey - German forces
Kapos. = Kaposvár

The Battle of the Transdanubian Hills (also known in Bulgaria as the Drava Operation (Bulgarian: Дравска операция, Dravska operatsiya)) was a defensive operation of the Bulgarian First Army during Bulgaria's participation in World War II against German Wehrmacht forces, who were trying to capture the north bank of the Drava river as part of Operation Spring Awakening.

Combat in the Transdanubian Hills lasted from 6 to 21 March 1945. The German attacks failed to achieve their objectives and were then eclipsed by the large-scale Soviet offensive from the area of Lake Balaton to Vienna.

== Deployment ==
German forces south of Lake Balaton were organized into two groups. The northern group was General de Angelis' 2nd Panzer Army which had the town of Kaposvár as its objective. Facing the 2nd Panzer Army's northern flank was General Sharokhin's Soviet 57th Army. The area in front of the 2nd Panzer Army's southern flank was defended by the III Corps of General Stoychev's Bulgarian First Army.

The other German group was General von Erdmannsdorff's LXXXXI Corps of Army Group E in northern Yugoslavia. LXXXXI Corps had concentrated near Donji Miholjac and Valpovo. Across the Drava River at Donji Miholjac, the IV Corps of the Bulgarian Army defended the routes leading to Pécs and Mohács. Northeast of Valpovo and across the Drava, General Nađ's 3rd Army of Josip Broz Tito's Yugoslav National Liberation Army defended the routes leading to northeast Yugoslavia. Named "Forest Devil" (German: Waldteufel), the LXXXXI Corps' operation had as its primary objective the town of Mohács.

In tandem with other German attacks that formed a part of Operation Spring Awakening, the German advance south of Lake Balaton aimed to surround and annihilate the 57th Army and First Bulgarian Army west of the Danube.

The 57th Army was the southernmost unit of the Red Army on the eastern front. South of the 57th Army, the Germans of 2nd Panzer Army and Army Group E were confronted by Soviet allies—Bulgarian forces in southern Hungary and Tito's forces in Yugoslavia. An attack in these areas offered the Germans the opportunities of attacking the less well equipped Bulgarians and Yugoslavs as well as potentially rolling up part of the Soviet southern flank. Thus, this region was of particular concern to Soviet Marshal Fyodor Tolbukhin, whose 3rd Ukrainian Front was deployed in southern Hungary and which commanded both the 57th Army and the Bulgarian First Army. (The unit south of the Bulgarians was the Yugoslav 3rd Army which was not subordinated to 3rd Ukrainian Front.) Alerted that a German attack south of Lake Balaton was imminent, Marshal Tolbukhin deployed additional artillery units to reinforce the 57th Army and the Bulgarian III Corps.

== Combat ==
The LXVIII Corps of the 2nd Panzer Army made the main thrust south of Lake Balaton on March 6 with an attack against the Soviet 57th Army and the Bulgarian III Corps' 10th Division. With three infantry divisions (the 16th was redeployed to assist the IV Corps) aided by a thaw that caused muddy ground, the Bulgarians held as did the 57th Army. Although the LXVIII Corps (also called "Group Konrad" for this operation) attacked across a 10-kilometer wide front, it failed to penetrate the Soviet and Bulgarian defenses and had to be content with pinning down the Soviets and Bulgarians in this region. By March 12, LXVIII Corps had moved the axis of its attack against the 57th Army and managed to penetrate some 10 kilometers into the Soviet defense before bogging down.

In the Donji Miholjac area, the German LXXXXI Corps attacked on March 6 with about 35,000 troops. Two infantry divisions of this corps, the 297th and 104th, crossed the Drava and, pressing the sparsely deployed Bulgarian IV Corps' 3rd Infantry Division, occupied an area 18 to 20 kilometers deep and five to six kilometers wide. On March 7, General Stoychev ordered the 16th Infantry Division in the Bulgarian III Corps to reinforce the 3rd Division at Donji Miholjac, but this required a march of 85 kilometers. During March 8–9, some Bulgarian elements began a military evacuation of Pécs. At this, Marshal Tolbukhin ordered the Soviet 133rd Rifle Corps out of reserve to reinforce the Bulgarian IV Corps. During the march to the battlefield, the Soviet troops encountered Bulgarian forces and fired upon them because the Bulgarian helmets resembled those of the Germans. The 133rd Rifle Corps, reinforced by Soviet artillery units and supported by ground-attack aircraft, subsequently took up positions at the critical junction of the Bulgarian and Yugoslav forces. Ironically, the German troops found themselves facing Panzer IV tanks operated by the Bulgarian Army.

During March 12–19, after fierce fighting in the villages of Drávaszabolcs, Drávapalkonya and Drávacsehi, the German advance was halted with the help of the 133rd Rifle Corps, the 84th Rifle Division from 3rd Ukrainian Front reserves, and the Bulgarian 16th Division. Realizing the 2nd Panzer Army was not going to break through on its front and under pressure from the Soviets and Bulgarians, the Germans evacuated the bridgehead across the Drava at Donji Miholjac during March 18–20, 1945.

Near Valpovo, the German 11th Luftwaffe Field Division, supported by two regiments of dismounted Cossacks, crossed the Drava and pushed about two kilometers to the northeast by March 8. In the face of resistance by the Yugoslav 12th Partisan Corps, this attack slowed, and by March 21, the Yugoslav 3rd Army had pushed the Germans away from Valpovo.

== Aftermath ==
The success of the Bulgarians, Soviets, and Yugoslavs during the combat in the Transdanubian Hills led to a failure of the planned German advance in the region and helped prepare the Vienna Offensive of the Red Army.

The participation in the offensive of the German LXXXXI Corps of Army Group E required a massing of forces that significantly weakened the overall German defense in Yugoslavia – a situation that was rapidly exploited by Tito's Yugoslav National Liberation Army.

The overall conduct of Operation Spring Awakening has also been criticized because of the German failure to deploy the stronger units of the 6th SS Panzer Army against the relatively weak Soviet and Bulgarian defenses south of Lake Balaton. The 6th SS Panzer Army was instead deployed north of Lake Balaton in an area the Hungarian military warned was unsuitable for an armored attack.

In Bulgaria the battle is also known as the Drava epic (Bulgarian: Дравска епопея) because of the bravery shown by the Bulgarians in withstanding the attack of a better trained and equipped adversary.

== Notes ==
- John Erickson, The Road to Berlin, New Haven: Yale University Press, 1983, ISBN 978-0-300-07813-8.
- Peter Gosztony, Endkampf an der Donau 1944/45, Wien-München: Molden-Taschenbuch-Verlag, 1978, ISBN 3-217-05126-2.
- Peter Gosztony, Stalins Fremde Heere, Bonn: Bernard & Graefe Verlag, 1991, ISBN 3-7637-5889-5.
- Frieser, Karl-Heinz; Schmider, Klaus; Schönherr, Klaus; Schreiber, Gerhard; Ungváry, Kristián; Wegner, Bernd (2007). Die Ostfront 1943/44 – Der Krieg im Osten und an den Nebenfronten [The Eastern Front 1943–1944: The War in the East and on the Neighbouring Fronts] (in German). Vol. VIII. München: Deutsche Verlags-Anstalt. ISBN 978-3-421-06235-2.
- Percy Schramm, Kriegstagebuch des Oberkommandos der Wehrmacht 1944–1945, Vol. II, Herrsching: Manfred Pawlak, 1982, ISBN 3-88199-073-9.
