= LXXXXI Army Corps =

LXXXXI Corps
- LXXXXI. Armeekorps
- Active: August 1944 – May 1945
- Country: Nazi Germany
- Branch: Heer (Wehrmacht)
- Size: Corps

Commanders
- Notable commanders: Ulrich Kleemann; Werner von Erdmannsdorff

The LXXXXI Army Corps (German: LXXXXI. Armeekorps) was an army corps of Germany's Wehrmacht during World War II. It was active from August 1944 to May 1945.

== History ==
The LXXXXI (91st) Army Corps was established using the staff of Oberfeldkommandantur 395, the former Befehlshaber Saloniki-Ägäis, on 7 August 1944. It was initially deployed in occupied Greece and occupied Serbia under Army Group E (Löhr), which was in turn subordinate to Army Group F (von Weichs).

Between 6 and 21 March 1945, the Corps attacked the Soviets and Bulgarians in Southern Hungary from Yugoslavia in Operation Spring Awakening, but was defeated in the Battle of the Transdanubian Hills.

In April 1945 the Corps moved to the Independent State of Croatia, before eventually surrendering in Styria in May 1945.

== Commanders ==
- Generalleutnant Ulrich Kleemann, corps commander between August 1944 and September 1944.
- General der Infanterie Werner von Erdmannsdorff, corps commander between September 1944 and May 1945.
