= Friedrich-Carl Cranz =

German general (1886–1941)

- Born: 14 November 1886; Kulm, West Prussia, German Empire
- Died: 24 March 1941 (aged 54); Neuhammer, Nazi Germany
- Burial place: Invalid's Cemetery
- Military career
- Allegiance: Nazi Germany
- Branch: Army (Wehrmacht)
- Rank: Generalleutnant
- Commands: 18th Infantry Division
- Conflicts: World War II
- Awards: Knight's Cross of the Iron Cross

Friedrich-Carl Cranz (14 November 1886 – 24 March 1941) was a German general during World War II who commanded 18th Infantry Division. He was a recipient of the Knight's Cross of the Iron Cross. Cranz was killed 24 March 1941 in a training accident by friendly artillery fire. He is buried in the Invalid's Cemetery in Berlin.

== Awards and decorations ==
- Knight's Cross of the Iron Cross on 29 June 1940 as Generalleutnant and commander of 18. Infanterie-Division

Military offices
| Preceded by Generalleutnant Erich von Manstein | Commander of 18. Infanterie-Division; 26 August 1939 – 24 March 1941 | Succeeded by Generalmajor Friedrich Herrlein |
