= Hungarian oilfields =

Hungarian oilfields may refer to:

- Algyő oil field
- Nagykanizsa oil field
- Nagylengyel oil field
