= Nagylengyel oil field =

Oil field in Hungary

Nagylengyel
- Country: Hungary
- Region: Zala County
- Offshore/onshore: onshore
- Operator: MOL Group

Field history
- Discovery: 1952
- Start of production: 1955

Production
- Current production of oil: 2,500 barrels per day (~1.2×10^{5} t/a)
- Estimated oil in place: 45 million tonnes (~ 53.3×10^{6} m^{3} or 335 million bbl)

The Nagylengyel oil field is an oil field located in Nagylengyel, Zala County. It was discovered in 1952 and developed by MOL Group. It began production in 1955 and produces oil. The total proven reserves of the Nagylengyel oil field are around 335 million barrels (45 million tonnes), and production is centered on 2,500 barrels per day (400 m^{3}/d).
