= Ulrich Kleemann =

German general during World War II

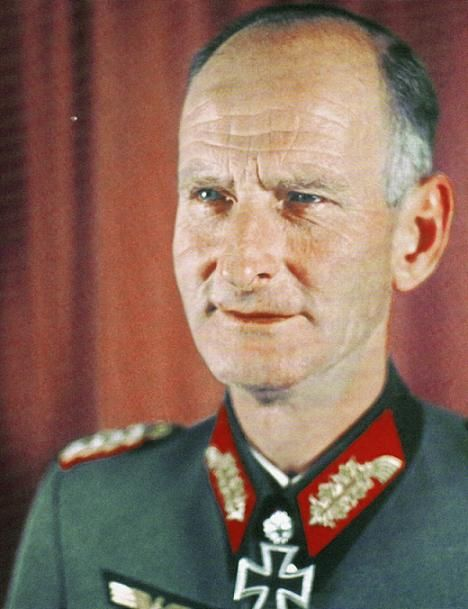
- Born: 23 March 1892; Langensalza, Province of Saxony, Kingdom of Prussia, German Empire
- Died: 1 January 1963 (aged 70); Oberursel, Hesse, West Germany
- Military career
- Allegiance: German Empire; Weimar Republic; Nazi Germany
- Branch: German Army
- Service years: 1911–1945
- Rank: General der Panzertruppe
- Commands: Sturm-Division "Rhodos"; 90th Light Infantry Division
- Conflicts: World War I World War II
- Awards: Knight's Cross of the Iron Cross with Oak Leaves

Ulrich Kleemann (23 March 1892 – 1 January 1963) was a German general during World War II and a recipient of the Knight's Cross of the Iron Cross of Nazi Germany. He commanded the 90th Light Africa Division in North Africa from 10 April 1942 to 13 July 1942 and from 10 August 1942 to 1 November 1942.

During the Dodecanese Campaign, Kleemann commanded the 7,500-strong Sturm-Division "Rhodos" during the attack on the Italian garrison of Rhodes. Kleeman defeated the Italians within two days, before British reinforcements could arrive in Rhodes. In September 1943, barely two weeks after the Italian surrender, British forces landed on Samos, Leros, and Kos. Kleemann counterattacked and within two months overran the three British garrisons.

In June 1944, two SS officers arrived by plane in Rhodes to hold discussions with Kleemann about the (Ladino speaking) Jews of Rhodes. On 13 July Kleemann issued an order ordering the Jewish population of Rhodes to gather in the city of Rhodes and the towns of Trianda, Cremasto and Villanova by noon on 17 July. On 16 July Kleemann was forced to issue another order stating that the Jewish question on Rhodes had apparently given rise to "doubts" and barring further questioning of orders by the troops.

Of the approximately 2,000 members of the ancient Jewish community of Rhodes, 1,700 were rounded up and transported to mainland Europe. Only about 160 of them survived the camps. Out of 6,000 Ladino-speaking Jews in the Dodecanese Islands, some 1,200 survived by escaping to the nearby coast of Turkey.

From 27 November 1944 to 8 May 1945, Kleeman commanded Panzer Corps Feldherrnhalle on the Eastern Front. Kleeman's tank corps fought in Hungary and was destroyed in the Battle of Budapest.

== Command history ==
- 1942 to 1943 General Officer Commanding, 90th Light Infantry Division (Wehrmacht), North Africa
- 1943 to 1944 General Officer Commanding, Assault Division "Rhodes"
- 1944 to 1945 General Officer Commanding, Panzer Corps Feldherrnhalle

== Awards and decorations ==
- Iron Cross (1914) 2nd Class (26 October 1914) &1st Class (8 July 1918)
- Clasp to the Iron Cross (1939) 2nd Class (19 September 1939) & 1st Class (25 October 1939)
- Knight's Cross of the Iron Cross with Oak Leaves
  - Knight's Cross on 13 October 1941 as Oberst and commander of 3. Schützen-Brigade
  - Oak Leaves on 16 September 1943 as Generalleutnant and commander of Sturm-Division Rhodos

== See also ==
- Dodecanese Campaign

Military offices
Preceded by Generalmajor Richard Veith	Commander of 90. Light Africa Division; 29 April 1942 – 14 June 1942	Succeeded by Oberst Werner Marcks
Preceded by none	Commander of LXXXXI. Armeekorps; 18 September 1944 – 9 October 1944	Succeeded by General der Infanterie Werner von Erdmannsdorff
Preceded by none	Commander of Panzerkorps Feldherrnhalle; 27 November 1944 – 8 May 1945	Succeeded by none
