= 18th Infantry Division (Wehrmacht) =

18th Infantry Division 18th (Motorized) Infantry Division 18th Panzergrenadier Division
- 18. Infanterie-Division; 18. (mot.) Infanterie-Division; 18. Panzergrenadier-Division
- Active: 1 October 1934 – 8 May 1945
- Country: Nazi Germany
- Branch: Army
- Type: Infantry
- Role: Motorized Infantry
- Size: Division
- Garrison/HQ: Liegnitz
- Engagements: World War II: Invasion of Poland; Battle of France; Eastern Front; Battle of Berlin

The 18th Infantry Division (German: 18. Infanterie-Division) was formed on 1 October 1934 as Infantry Command III (Infanterieführer III) in Liegnitz and renamed the 18th Infantry Division on 15 October 1935. Mobilized in August 1939, it participated in the Invasion of Poland and in 1940 in the Battle of France. After the French campaign, the division was motorized and redesignated 18th Motorized Infantry Division on 1 November 1940 serving on the Eastern Front for the remainder of the war. In June 1943, the division was redesignated 18th Panzergrenadier Division.

== 18th Infantry Division ==
- From September 1939 until May 1940 the division fought in Invasion of Poland and then made up part of the occupation force.
- From May 1940 until November 1940 the division fought in the Battle of France and then made up part of the occupation force when it was redesignated 18th Motorised Infantry Division.

== 18th Motorized Infantry Division ==
Formed 1 November 1940

- Part of the occupation force in France from November 1940 until June 1941.
- Fought on the Eastern Front, central sector from June 1941 until January 1942.
- Fought on the Eastern front, northern sector from January 1942 until June 1943 when it was redesignated 18th Panzergrenadier Division.

== 18th Panzergrenadier Division ==
Formed on 23 June 1943.

- Fought on the Eastern front, northern sector from June 1943 until October 1943.
- Fought on the Eastern front, central sector from October 1943 until September 1944. It was devastated in the Soviet 1944 summer offensive.
- The remnants of the division fought in Eastern Prussia and in the Battle of Berlin. The survivors tried to fight their way out of Berlin on 2 May 1945 when Berlin surrendered to the Soviets.

== Commanding officers ==
=== 18. Infanterie-Division ===
- Generalleutnant Hermann Hoth, 1 October 1934 – 1 April 1938
- Generalleutnant Erich von Manstein, 1 April 1938 – 26 August 1939
- Generalleutnant Friedrich-Carl Cranz, 26 August 1939 – 1 November 1940

=== 18. Infanterie-Division (mot.) ===
- Generalleutnant Friedrich-Carl Cranz, 1 November 1940 – 24 March 1941
- General der Infanterie Friedrich Herrlein, 24 March – 15 December 1941
- General der Infanterie Werner von Erdmannsdorff, 15 December 1941 – 23 June 1943

=== 18. Panzergrenadier-Division ===
- General der Infanterie Werner von Erdmannsdorff, 23 June 1943 – 9 August 1943
- Generalleutnant Karl Zutavern, 9 August 1943 – 14 April 1944
- General der Artillerie Curt Jahn, 14 April 1944 – 24 May 1944
- Generalleutnant Karl Zutavern, 24 May 1944 – 6 July 1944
- Generalleutnant Dr. Hans Boelsen, 6 July 1944 – 1 January 1945
- Generalmajor Josef Rauch, 1 January – 8 May 1945
