= Otto von Erdmannsdorff =

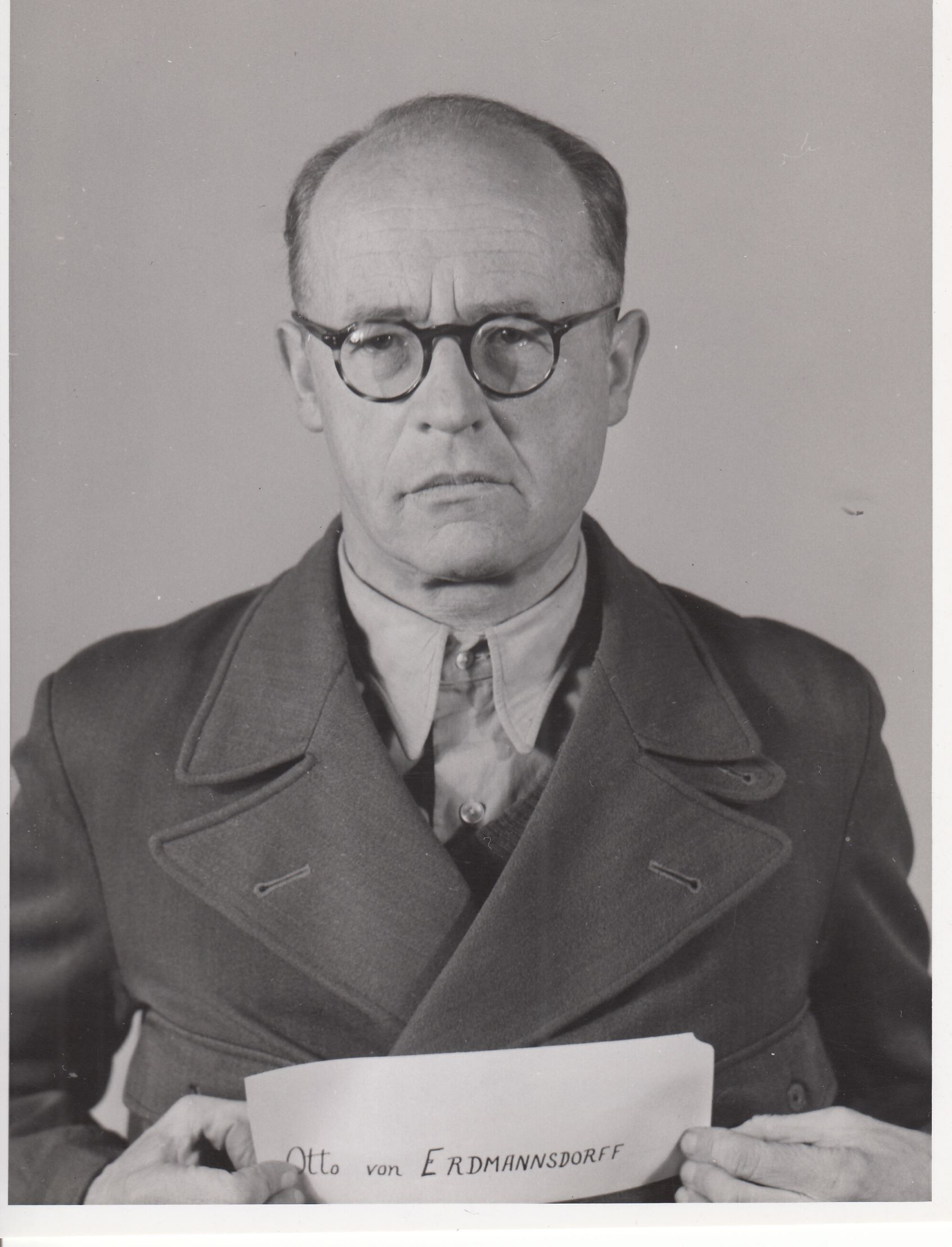
Otto von Erdmannsdorff

Otto von Erdmannsdorff (22 October 1888 – 30 December 1978) was a German diplomat who served as ambassador to Hungary under the Nazis from 1937 to 1941, and was later acquitted of war crimes in the Ministries Trial.

A member of the Saxon juridical service before the First World War, and a participant in that war, Von Erdmannsdorff afterward held diplomatic posts in Mexico, China, and Tokyo. He took up his post as ambassador to Hungary on May 11, 1937. Although serving as ambassador for Hitler's government during a critical period, he was not himself a Nazi: the U.S. Ambassador to Hungary at the time, John F. Montgomery, mentioned that von Erdmannsdorff "almost resigned at one time because he didn't want to cope with the Nazis", and Hungarian regent Miklós Horthy described him as "the last of the professional German diplomats". He nonetheless became a nominal member of the party in 1937. He was replaced as ambassador in July 1941 by Dietrich von Jagow, a party member rather than professional diplomat.

Thereafter, he served as Deputy to Ernst Wörmann, who was Chief of the Political Division of the German Foreign Office. Although the Political Division was staffed mainly by civil servants who were either nominal members of the Nazi Party or not members at all, it was nonetheless involved in implementing the Final Solution. This led to von Erdmannsdorff's being charged with war crimes in the Ministries Trial after the war; however, he was acquitted as a result of a determination that he lacked sufficient power and influence to have been able to prevent the crimes.

His memoirs are unpublished, and contain among other things a number of quotations from Horthy recorded during von Erdmannsdorff's four years representing Germany in Hungary.
