= Gottfried von Erdmannsdorff =

German general (1893-1946)

- Born: 25 April 1893; Kamenz, Kingdom of Saxony, German Empire
- Died: 30 January 1946 (aged 52); Minsk, Byelorussian SSR, Soviet Union (now Belarus)
- Cause of death: Execution by hanging
- Relatives: Werner von Erdmannsdorff (brother)
- Military career
- Allegiance: German Empire (to 1918); Weimar Republic (to 1933); Nazi Germany
- Branch: Army (Wehrmacht)
- Service years: 1913–1933; 1934–1945
- Rank: Generalmajor
- Commands: 465th Division "Fortress Mogilev"
- Conflicts: World War I World War II: Invasion of Poland; Battle of Belgium; Battle of France; Operation Barbarossa; Mogilev Offensive (POW)
- Awards: Knight's Cross of the Iron Cross

Gottfried von Erdmannsdorff (25 April 1893 – 30 January 1946) was a German general during World War II. He was convicted by a Soviet military tribunal for war crimes at the Minsk Trial and executed in 1946.

== Fortress Mogilev ==
On 27 June 1944, as part of Mogilev Offensive, Soviet troops made a deep breakthrough north of Mogilev by crossing the Dnieper River over a bridge at Trebuchi. The 4th Army dispatched a message to Erdmannsdorff that Mogilev be held as a "fortified position" and ordered him to hold the town until the very last man. The 4th Army retreated the XXXIX Panzer Corps and the XII Army Corps a full 21 km west of Mogilev, leaving the town to its fate against the overwhelming Soviet attacks. Later in the evening Erdmannsdorff reported that German forces had been weakened and the Soviets had started to reach the edge of the city. Only 2 hours and 40 minutes later Erdmannsdorff stated that the only part of the city still under his control was the city center and hand to hand combat was starting to take place. The last radio message that was received from Mogilev was at 11 o'clock in the evening.

== Minsk Trial ==
After the Soviet troops defeated "Fortress Mogilev", Erdmannsdorff was captured by Soviet troops. He was tried by a Soviet tribunal (the Minsk Trial) for crimes committed in Belarus along with 18 other defendants, 14 of whom, including Erdmannsdorff, were sentenced to death on 29 January 1946.

Erdmannsdorff was condemned on charges including the deportation of 10,000 people, the destruction of villages, schools and churches, and the shootings of disabled people during the construction of fortifications, the use of people as human shields, and the organization of reprisals operations against civilians under the guise of fighting partisans, and the establishment of camps in which many people died.

The officers were hanged in public (with over 100,000 civilian spectators) in the horse racing venue of Minsk, on 30 January 1946. He was the younger brother of General der Infanterie Werner von Erdmannsdorff.

== Awards and decorations ==
- Knight's Cross of the Iron Cross on 20 March 1942 as Oberst and commander of Infanterie-Regiment 171

Military offices
Preceded by none	Commander of Division Nr. 465; 29 September 1942 – 1 March 1944	Succeeded by Generalleutnant Kurt Hoffmann
