= Werner von Erdmannsdorff =

German military general (1891–1945)

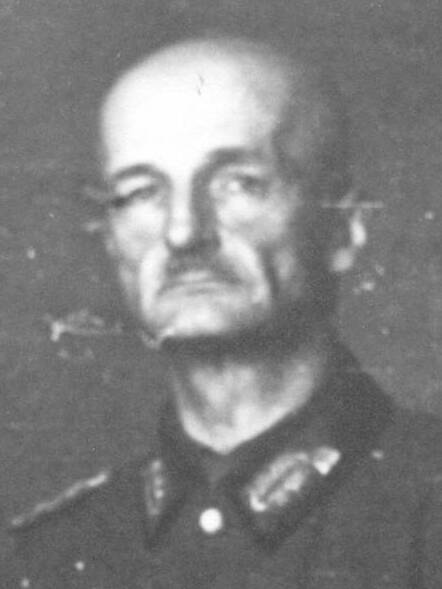
- Born: 26 July 1891; Bautzen, German Empire
- Died: 5 June 1945 (aged 53); Ljubliana, Democratic Federal Yugoslavia
- Cause of death: Execution by firing squad
- Relatives: Gottfried von Erdmannsdorff (brother)
- Military career
- Allegiance: German Empire (to 1918); Weimar Republic (to 1933); Nazi Germany
- Branch: Army
- Service years: 1910–1945
- Rank: General of the Infantry
- Commands: 18th Infantry Division; LXXXXI Army Corps
- Awards: Knight's Cross of the Iron Cross

Werner von Erdmannsdorff (27 July 1891 – 5 June 1945) was a general in the Wehrmacht during World War II. He was a recipient of the Knight's Cross of the Iron Cross. He was married to Helene née von Tschirsky und Bögendorff (1895–1982).

As last commander of the LXXXXI Army Corps in Yugoslavia, Erdmannsdorff surrendered to the British troops in May 1945.

He was extradited to Yugoslavia and executed without trial on 5 June 1945 by Yugoslav partisans in Ljubljana, alongside generals Gustav Fehn (XV Mountain Corps), Friedrich Stephan (104th Jäger Division) and Heinz Kattner (Feldkommandant of Sarajevo).

He was the older brother of general Gottfried von Erdmannsdorff, who himself would be hanged in Minsk in January 1946 for war crimes.

== Awards and decorations ==
- Knight's Cross of the Iron Cross on 8 March 1942 as Oberst and commander of Infanterie-Regiment 30 (mot.)

Military offices
Preceded by Generalmajor Friedrich Herrlein	Commander of 18. Infanterie-Division (mot.); 15 December 1941 – 23 June 1943	Succeeded by Renamed 18. Panzergrenadier-Division
Preceded by Previously 18. Infanterie-Division (mot.)	Commander of 18. Panzergrenadier-Division; 23 June 1943 – 9 August 1943	Succeeded by Generalleutnant Karl Zutavern
Preceded by Generalleutnant Ulrich Kleemann	Commander of LXXXXI. Armeekorps; 9 October 1944 – 8 May 1945	Succeeded by None
