= Joel Spiegelman =

American musician

Joel Spiegelman (January 23, 1933 – November 13, 2023) was an American composer, conductor, concert pianist, harpsichordist, recording artist, arranger, author and professor.

Joel Spiegelman was educated at Yale, The University of Buffalo, Brandeis University, the Paris Conservatory (class of Nadia Boulanger), Moscow’s Gnesin Institute, and the Leningrad Conservatory.

As a composer, Spiegelman was widely known for his blending of techniques from traditional classical music, dodecaphonic music, aleatoric music, gospel, Russian folk, and electronic idioms. He wrote original music for string quartet, piano trio, piano quintet, chamber music with percussion, solo instruments, wind ensembles, symphony orchestra, ballet, film, choral and vocal music.

== Biography ==
Joel Spiegelman was born in Buffalo, NY on January 23, 1933, to Jenny Simon Spiegelman (b. Brailov, Ukraine, 1906) and Dr. Harry Spiegelman (b. Zhitomir, Ukraine, 1905). Both were immigrants from the Russian Empire, arriving in the United States as small children during the early years of the 20th century.

His mother, Jenny Simon Spiegelman, was the chief influence on his early musical development. Herself a pianist, she steered him to her piano teacher, Otto Hager. Professor Hager had studied in Germany with the renowned teacher Theodor Leschetizky.

Besides the influence his mother had on his development, at the age of 10, he was totally enthralled by Vladimir Horowitz's performance of Tchaikovsky’s 1st Piano Concerto with Arturo Toscanini conducting the NBC Symphony on an old RCA recording. He then went to his mother and said “I want to do that too.”

Joel Spiegelman gave his first concert at the age of 4 years old when he performed on the NBC affiliate radio station in Buffalo, NY. He made his official national debut at 13 years old in 1946 when he received wide attention with a review in Musical America for a performance as piano soloist with the Buffalo Philharmonic. After this debut he went on to studied with Mona Bates, a well known piano teacher in Toronto, Canada.

He lived in Buffalo, NY from the time of his birth until 1953 except for one year – 1949-50 – when he was student at Yale University School of Music. Between 1950 and 1953 he was a premedical student with a major in Philosophy at the university of Buffalo. In 1953, Spiegelman moved to Boston to study music at the Longy School of Music in Cambridge, MA. In 1954, he was accepted into the newly formed graduate school at Brandeis University in Waltham, MA where he received a Master of Fine Arts degree in musical composition in 1956. At Brandeis, he was a student of composers Harold Shapero, Irving Fine and Arthur Berger.

In 1956, Spiegelman was awarded a fellowship grant from the French government and went to Paris to study composition with Nadia Boulanger at the Paris National Conservatory of Music. He made his conducting debut in Paris at the Abbaye de Royaumont conducting his own composition written for the opening of their summer season in 1958. That same year, he also made his debut as a piano soloist performing the solo keyboard part of Bach’s Brandenburg Concerto No. 5.

He remained in Paris until 1960 when he returned to Boston to continue his studies at Brandeis Graduate School. A year later he was appointed to the Brandeis music faculty to teach music theory, piano, harpsichord and perform as an Artist-in-Residence. He taught and performed at Brandeis until moving to New York after being appointed as Professor of Music at Sarah Lawrence College in 1966. During his residence in Boston, he was a performing member as harpsichordist of the Camerata of the Boston Music of Fine Arts Old Instruments collection.

In September 1965 he left for Moscow to do research on 18th century Russian keyboard music and the new post-WWII contemporary Soviet composers such as Andrei Volkonsky, Alfred Schnittke, Edison Denisov, Valentin Silvestrov, Leonid Grabovsky, Sergei Slonimsky, Andrei Petrov, Rodion Shchedrin and others. He brought their works back to the United States performing them at various universities, the New York Philharmonic, etc. He likewise returned to Russia performing and recording music by American composers. In November of 1965 he made his Moscow debut as a harpsichordist to remarkable success with the press and the public. This began a linking of the musical cultures of both the United States and Russia that continues to the present day.

In the Spring of 1967, Spiegleman was chosen by Leonard Bernstein to perform and record as harpsichord soloist with the New York Philharmonic in the New York premier of Edison Denisov’s work for harpsichord and orchestra, “Crescendo e Diminuendo”.

Spiegelman’s continuing interest in the possibilities of electronic media was further demonstrated in his transcription of Bach’s “Goldberg Variations”. He used the then revolutionary sampling technology applied by inventor Ray Kurzweil. A recording was made of this transcription on the Kurzweill 250 Keyboard and released by East-West Records (a Time-Warner company) in 1988 as “New Age Bach”

His teaching career spanned a thirty year period (1961-1991) during which he taught at Brandeis University, The University of California, San Diego (Regents Professor) and Sarah Lawrence College.

In the last thirty years of his life, Spiegelman enjoyed retrospective concerts of his works at Carnegie Hall, Saint-Petersburg (Russia), Vilnius, the Moscow Conservatory, and the Moscow Kremlin in January 2002.

He conducted and recorded with the leading symphony orchestras of Russia including the Saint-Petersburg Philharmonic, The Saint-Petersburg Classical Symphony, the state Symphony of Russia, The Moussorgsky Opera Company of Saint-Petersburg, The Tchaikovsky Orchestra, the Moscow Radio TV Orchestra, and Metro Philharmonic, an international youth symphony formed in Moscow by Mr. Spiegelman and composed of gifted young professional musicians.

In 2010 he conducted the Kyrgyz National Symphony in a Requiem concert for those lost during the revolution of April 7, 2010. He returned to Bishkek, Kyrgyzstan in 2012 to lead the Loving Cup (Chasa Mira) international festival of music and art where he once again conducted the Kyrgyz Symphony joined by members of the Rachmaninoff Symphony of Moscow Russia.

During the spring of 2010, Spiegelman was invited to teach music at the children’s home in Uummannaq, Greenland. He went there with his then partner Galya Morrell and together they created a program called Uummannaq Music whose objective was to teach music to Inuit children guiding at the children’s home. During this time and continuing through the season of 2011, taught Instrumental music on piano and recorder, conducted the children’s choir and played more than 40 concerts on the piano throughout the West Coast of Greenland.

== Private life ==
Joel Spiegelman was legally married four times with one long-term common law partnership with artist Trudi Vogel. His first marriage was to Gail Voelker (b. Buffalo, NY 1933). Their marriage lasted 19 years and produced three children, Maia Hunter (b. Paris, France, 1958), Katia Lief (b. Dreux, France 1959), and Eric Spiegelman, a.k.a. Ariel Ben Yaakov (b. Boston, MA 1962).

He has three grandchildren: Harry Hunter b. 1992, Eli Lief, b.1994, Karenna Lief, b.1997

== Compositions ==
- Aria in Memoriam for violin and piano (1955)
- Two Hebrew Motets (1957)
- Toccata Sonatina for piano (1956)
- My New York for symphony orchestra (1957)
- Fantasy for String Quartet no 1. (1962)
- La Donna Mobile for electronics and mobile art (1967)
- Kousochki (Morsels) for piano 4 hands (1966)
- Phantom of the Opera for women’s chorus (1967)
- Symphony of the Abyss for Buchla Synthesizer (1967)
- Astral Dimensions no 1 for piano, percussion and. string trio (1973)
- The Possessed a ballet (with Meyer Kupferman)(1974)
- Fantasy for String Quartet No. 2 (1975)
- Cicade Images : a ballet. (1982)
- Astral Dimensions no 2. For piano trio (1983)
- Cry of the Bird of Passage for Symphony Orchestra (2010)

=== Incidental music ===
- Medea – composed an electronic score for the Robinson Jeffers play based on Euripides' Medea performed in 1964 at the Brandeis University's Spingold Theatre*
- They – composed the first electronic music score written for a film based on a novel by Marya Mannes. Produced by NET New York, 1969.
- The Possessed – composed music for a ballet by Pearl Lang based on the play The Dybbuk. First performed in 1974 at the 92nd Street YMHA in New York City.

=== Orchestral works ===
- My New York for full symphony orchestra, Paris, 1958, World premier Moscow, 1994 by Moscow Radio Symphony
