= Terenty Batsanov =

Belarusian Red Army major general (1894 – 1941)

Terenty Kirillovich Batsanov
- Batsanov in 1940
- Born: 28 October 1894; Voshchanki village, Rogachev Uezd, Gomel Governorate, Russian Empire
- Died: 23 September 1941 (aged 46) near Hrebinky, Poltava Oblast, Ukrainian SSR, Soviet Union
- Military career
- Allegiance: Russian Empire; Russian SFSR; Soviet Union
- Branch: Imperial Russian Army; Red Army
- Service years: 1915–1917; 1918–1941
- Rank: Major general
- Commands: 17th Rifle Division; 24th Rifle Division
- Conflicts: World War I; Russian Civil War; Polish–Soviet War; Basmachi revolt; World War II
- Awards: Order of the Red Banner; Order of the Patriotic War, 1st class

Terenty Kirillovich Batsanov (Russian: Терентий Кириллович Бацанов; 28 October 1894 – 23 September 1941) was a Belarusian Red Army major general.

A veteran of World War I and the Russian Civil War, Batsanov rose to division command in the late 1930s. He commanded the 17th Rifle Division and the 24th Rifle Division in the first months after the beginning of Operation Barbarossa and was killed in the Battle of Kiev in late September.

== Early life, World War I, and Russian Civil War ==
Batsanov was born on 28 October 1894 to a peasant family in the village of Voshchanki, Rogachev Uezd, Gomel Governorate. After graduating from a four-year primary school, he worked for the local landowner, at a brick factory in Kiev, and as a miner in Kryvyi Rih. During World War I, he was drafted into the Imperial Russian Army in January 1915, serving with the 3rd Life Guards Rifle Regiment on the Southwestern Front. Among the battles Batsanov fought in was the Brusilov Offensive in 1916, and he was awarded the Cross of St. George for his actions.

After the October Revolution, Batsanov left the army and became commander of the 1st Mogilev Red Guards Partisan Detachment, fighting against German troops and in the suppression of the rebellion of the Polish I Corps in Russia in the area of Bykhov, Zhlobin, and Bobruisk. In May 1918, he and his detachment joined the 153rd Rifle Regiment of the 17th Rifle Division of the Red Army, forming in Cherikov. With the regiment, Batsanov served as a company and battalion commander, fighting on the Western, Southwestern, and Northern Fronts against the Ukrainian People's Army, the Northwestern Army, and in the Polish–Soviet War. He was twice wounded and shell-shocked. In late 1920, with the division, he fought in the suppression of the Slutsk uprising in the area of Mozyr. Batsanov became a member of the Communist Party in 1919.

== Interwar period ==
After the end of the war, Batsanov entered the Advanced Battalion Commanders' Retraining Courses of the staff of the Western Front in Vitebsk, then returned to the 17th Division as a battalion commander in the 151st Rifle Regiment upon graduation in 1921. In July of that year he became assistant commander and battalion commander in the division's training-cadre regiment. With the regiment, he fought on the Turkestan Front against the Basmachi movement in the territory of the former Emirate of Bukhara. For distinguishing himself in battle, Batsanov was awarded the Order of the Red Star and the Order of the Red Crescent, 3rd class, by the Bukharan People's Republic. In January 1923 he became an assistant battalion commander in the 50th Rifle Regiment of the 17th Division, and between October of that year and August 1924 completed the Vystrel course. After returning to the division, Batsanov served as a battalion commander in the 51st Rifle Regiment, and later held the same position with the 50th Regiment. In October 1928, 50th Rifle Regiment commander Ivan Konev assessed Batsanov as a "resolute" commander with "sufficient initiative" who made decisions "boldly and confidently".

After transferring to the 1st Moscow Proletarian Rifle Division of the Moscow Military District in May 1929, Batsanov served as a battalion commander and assistant commander of the division's 1st Rifle Regiment. He transferred to the Military School of Technical Special Services of the Red Army Air Forces in January 1931, becoming a training battalion commander and assistant chief of staff of the school. Having graduated from the night school faculty of the Frunze Military Academy in April 1932, Batsanov became commander of the 164th Rifle Regiment of the 55th Rifle Division in Rylsk in October 1937, then took command of the 17th Rifle Division in Gorky in May 1938. He led the division in the Winter War, receiving the Order of the Red Banner for his leadership in the breakthrough of Finnish defenses on the Salmenkaita river. The award citation described Batsanov's actions thusly: "Neglecting the risk to his life, Batsanov led the battle and encouraged the soldiers of the division with his fearlessness and personal example." When the Red Army reintroduced general officer ranks, Batsanov, who had been promoted to kombrig on 4 November 1939, became a major general on 4 June 1940. After the end of the war, the 17th was relocated to the Western Special Military District and stationed in Polotsk.

== World War II ==
After the beginning of Operation Barbarossa on 22 June 1941, Batsanov led the division in the Battle of Białystok–Minsk. With the 13th Army of the Western Front, the division was encircled and suffered heavy losses. The forces of the division under Batsanov's command broke out of the encirclement on 14 July in the area of Ozarichi, 35 kilometres (22 miles) from Kalinkovichi. The remnants of the 17th were used to rebuild the 24th Rifle Division, which Batsanov became commander of. As part of the 21st Army of the Southwestern Front, the division fought a mobile defense in the Priluki area from 15 August. The division was encircled and destroyed in the Battle of Kiev, and Batsanov was killed in late September in the area of the stanitsa of Hrebinky, Poltava Oblast. His death date was recorded as 23 September on official records. In 1965, Batsanov was among the generals killed in 1941 who were posthumously awarded the Order of the Patriotic War, 1st class in commemoration of the 20th anniversary of the end of the war.

== Personal life ==
Batsanov was married to Elena Aleekseevna Batsanova (Petrunicheva), the sister of Nikolai Petrunichev, Chief of Staff of the Council of People's Commissars of the Soviet Union. Terenty Batsanov had one son, Boris Batsanov, who became Chief of Staff of the Soviet Prime Minister 1975–1991. His granddaughter is an Arctic explorer and artist Galya Morrell.

== Awards and honors ==
Batsanov was a recipient of the following awards and decorations:

- Order of the Red Banner (1940)
- Order of the Patriotic War, 1st class (1965)
- Order of the Red Star of the Bukharan People's Republic (1922)
- Order of the Red Crescent of the Bukharan People's Republic (1922)
- Jubilee Medal "XX Years of the Workers' and Peasants' Red Army" (1938)
- Medal "For the Defence of Kiev" (1989)
- Cross of St. George, 4th class (not worn after 1917)

In 1989, a memorial plaque to Batsanov and other soldiers of the 17th Rifle Division was unveiled on a wall of the Nizhny Novgorod Kremlin.
