= 17th Rifle Division =

- Active: 1918–1941; 1941–1945
- Country: Soviet Union
- Branch: Red Army
- Type: Infantry
- Size: Division
- Engagements: Russian Civil War; Polish–Soviet War; World War II; Winter War; Eastern Front; Belorussian Strategic Defensive; Operation Bagration; East Prussian Offensive
- Decorations: Order of the Red Banner
- Battle honours: Moscow; Rezkaja; Bobruysk

Commanders
- Notable commanders: Georgy Sofronov (1922–1923, 1924–1930); Pyotr Filatov (1923–1924); Georgy Bondar (1932–1937); Terenty Batsanov (1938–1941)

The 17th Rifle Division was an infantry division of the Soviet Union's Red Army during World War II.

== First Formation ==
The division was first formed on 23 October 1918 from the 1st Vitebsk Rifle Division and 2nd Smolensk Rifle Division by the order of the Military council of the Smolensk Defensive Region.

The division participated in the Soviet wars against Lithuania, Ukraine, Belarus as well as in the Polish–Soviet War. The division was stationed along the Berezina River in 1920.

The 17th Rifle Division under Grigory Borzinsky consisted of four rifle regiments, a Ukrainian company, the 5th and 6th raions of the 2nd Border Protection District, a cavalry squadron, 18 light guns, armored train №5, an armored squadron and the 2nd Smolensk Air Group. In February, according to Polish intelligence, the division had 7,045 soldiers, 165 cavalrymen, 157 machine guns, 20 field guns, 4 heavy guns, 3 armored trains, 4 armored cars.

The division was garrisoned at Nizhny Novgorod (renamed Gorky in 1932) from 1920 to 1939.

=== World War II ===
In 1939 the division was broken up and used to form three divisions, the new 17th, 136th and the 137th Rifle Divisions. The new 17th Rifle Division, formed from the 49th Rifle Regiment, continued the traditions of the original 17th.

==== Composition ====
- 49th Rifle Regiment
- 50th Rifle Regiment
- 51st Rifle Regiment
- 17th Artillery Regiment

The division was maintained on a reduced status until December 1939 when the division was brought to full strength for the Winter War with Finland. The division returned to Gorky in April 1940. In June 1940 the division was moved to the Lithuanian border and assigned to the Belorussian Military District.

Assigned to 21st Rifle Corps, 10th Army when the Germans invaded the Soviet Union in June 1941 and located in the Vitebsk and Polotsk area. By the end of June the division was surrounded in the area east of Minsk. Though the division was destroyed in late June 1941 it was not officially disbanded until 19 September 1941.

==== Composition ====
- 55th Rifle Regiment
- 271st Rifle Regiment
- 278th Rifle Regiment
- 20th Artillery Regiment
- 35th Howitzer Regiment (never formed)
- 390th Howitzer Regiment (added April 1940)

== Second Formation ==
Reformed from the 17th Moscow People's Militia Rifle Division on 26 October 1941. Assigned to the 33rd Army, Reserve Front. In November 1941 it was assigned to the 43rd Army, Western Front where it participated in the Moscow Counteroffensive. The division remained in the Western Front until the summer of 1943. In late July 1943 the division participated in the Orel Strategic Counter-offensive Operation and in late August was transferred to the Bryansk Front. Reassigned to the 53rd Rifle Corps, 48th Army, 1st Belorussian Front in February 1944. The division stayed with this Corps and Army until the end of the war. In June 1944 the division took part in Operation Bagration and the liberation of Bobruisk, Belorussia. From February to April 1945 the division participated in the East Prussian Offensive ending the war there as part of the occupation forces assigned to the Northern Group of Forces.

After a brief period on occupation duty the division was returned to the Soviet Union in the Volga Military District at Yoshkar-Ola where it was reorganized as the 1st Rifle Brigade as part of the 53rd Rifle Corps. It was disbanded in March 1947.

=== Composition ===
- 1312th Rifle Regiment
- 1314th Rifle Regiment
- 1316th Rifle Regiment
- 980th Artillery Regiment

=== Commanders ===
- Colonel Pyotr Sergeyevich Kozlov (4 July–10 October 1941)
- Colonel Mikhail Pavlovich Safir (11–16 October 1941)
- Colonel Pyotr Sergeyevich Kozlov (16–21 October 1941)
- Kombrig Stepan Ivanovich Lyubarsky (21–24 October 1941)
- General-mayor Dmitry Mikhailovich Selezynov (24 October 1941–24 September 1942)
- Colonel Ivan Leontyevich Ragulya (25–30 September 1942)
- Lieutenant Colonel Matvey Kononenko (30 September–7 October 1942)
- Colonel Ivan Leontyevich Ragulya (8 October 1942–14 September 1943, promoted to general-mayor 14 February 1943)
- Colonel Pavel Stepanovich Romanenko (15 September 1943–6 January 1944)
- Colonel Viktor Aleksandrovich Ivanov (7 January–9 May 1944)
- Lieutenant Colonel Aleksandr Pavlovich Lukin (10 May–24 October 1944, promoted to colonel 15 August)
- Colonel Andrey Feoktistovich Grebnev (25 October 1944–20 February 1945)
- Colonel Pyotr Ivanovich Skachkov (21–27 February 1945)
- Colonel Andrey Fekotistovich Grebnev (28 February–31 July 1945)
- Colonel Mikhail Pavlovich Serebrov (21 July 1945–January 1946)
- General-mayor Ivan Vasilyevich Mokhin (February–September 1946)

== See also ==
- List of infantry divisions of the Soviet Union 1917–1957
