= Vasily Poyarov =

Soviet general-mayor

Vasily Yakovlevich Poyarov
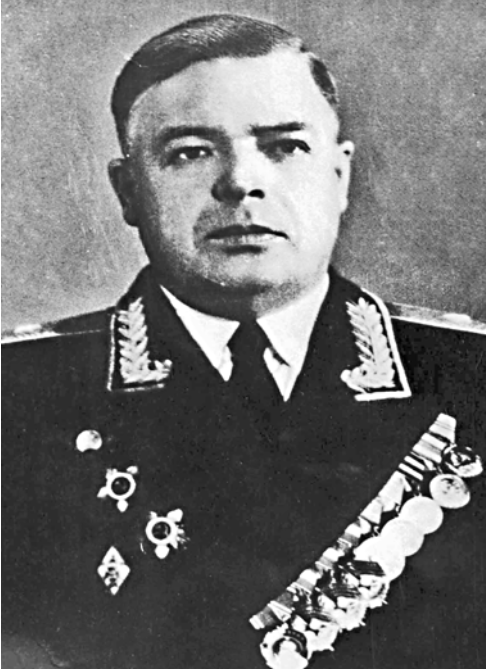
- Poyarov, postwar
- Born: 24 December 1909; Staroye Podgorodnoye, Bezhetsky Uyezd, Tver Governorate, Russian Empire
- Died: 25 September 1967 (aged 57) Leningrad, Soviet Union
- Allegiance: Soviet Union
- Branch: Red Army (Soviet Army from 1946); Civil Defense Forces
- Service years: 1930–1967
- Rank: General-mayor
- Commands: 126th Rifle Brigade; 199th Rifle Division; 81st Rifle Corps; 97th Guards Rifle Division
- Conflicts: World War II
- Awards: Order of Lenin

Vasily Yakovlevich Poyarov (Russian: Василий Яковлевич Пояров; 24 December 1909 – 25 September 1967) was a Soviet Army general-mayor who held brigade, division, and corps commands during World War II.

== Early life and prewar service ==
A Russian, Vasily Yakovlevich Poyarov was born in a peasant family on 24 December 1909 in the village of Staroye Podgorodnoye, Bezhetsky Uyezd, Tver Governorate. Choosing a military career, he entered the Combined Military School in Moscow on 17 September 1930. Poyarov became a member of the Communist Party in 1932. After his graduation, Poyarov remained at the school from November 1933, commanding a platoon in the battalion training reserve platoon commanders, rising to class commander in March 1935 and company commander in May 1938. In June 1940 Poyarov was transferred to command a student company of the Training and Preparation Course for Supervisory Party Workers, located at the settlement of Karpovka (now in Nizhny Novgorod Oblast).

== World War II ==
After Germany invaded the Soviet Union, Poyarov, then a captain, continued in his previous position. In September he became assistant chief of the course Training Department. In February 1942 he was appointed chief of the Operations Section of the headquarters of the 200th Cadet Rifle Brigade, forming at the settlement of Yug, Molotov Oblast. The formation of the brigade was halted in late March, and Poyarov transferred to hold the same role with the 126th Separate Rifle Brigade, forming at Troitsk, Chelyabinsk Oblast. In April the brigade was sent to the Northwestern Front, where it fought as part of the 11th Army. For his performance in the fighting for the village of Bolshiye Dubovitsy in June 1942, Poyarov was recommended for the Order of the Red Star, which was downgraded to the Medal for Courage, awarded on 19 August. The recommendation read:

Comrade Poyarov, during his tenure as chief of the 1st Section of the staff of the brigade, displayed himself in an exceptionally positive manner. He is an energetic and well prepared commander.

In the battle for Bolshiye Dubovitsy on the night of 10–11 June 1942, as chief of the First Section, he took an energetic part in resolving the questions of cooperation as a result of which the battle concluded successfully. In the course of the battle itself Comrade Poyarov personally went to separate sectors of the battle for leadership and personal influence on the soldiers and commanders. Using his great authority, Comrade Poyarov instilled vigor in the soldiers by his appearance at the decisive sectors and roused them to new combat feats. Comrade Poyarov merits the award of the Order of the Red Star.

In July Major Poyarov was appointed brigade chief of staff, taking part in the battles on the Demyansk and Staraya Russa axis. For his performance in fighting in March, brigade commander Fyodor Karlov recommended Poyarov for the Order of the Red Banner, which was awarded on 24 March 1943. The recommendation read:

On 8 March 1943, the enemy, covering the retreat of the main group, defended on the line of Novoye Ramushevo, Elevation 29.3, and further on the forest edge to Elevation 32.1. The objective of pursuing the enemy towards Novoye Ramushevo and Omychkino through small group operations was assigned to the brigade. Comrade Poyarov finely developed the plan of operations. He organized through observation, reconnaissance and the study of all installation systems on the forward edge of the enemy defense, both before and during the battle. He ensured uninterrupted means of communications and direction of the battle. He well thought out and finely prepared the plan of operations in time and gave the opportunity to detect the enemy's intentions. Beginning the battle with the enemy, units of the brigade advanced six to seven kilometers with few losses, capturing two tactically vital settlements: Novoye Ramushevo and Omychkino, which the enemy strongly fortified and steadfastly defended over the course of several months.

On 16 March 1943, in the Kudrovo region, thanks to fine organization of reconnaissance and observation, the enemy's intentions were detected in a timely manner again, giving the opportunity to organize the battle. The units of the brigade overcame enemy resistance, moving ten kilometers forward. Between 8–9 and 16 March 1943 the units of the brigade captured: one gun, three mortars, 18 heavy and light machine guns, 150 rifles, fourteen submachine guns, one staff car, one artillery tractor, and a large quantity of shells, mortar bombs and ammunition. Two German soldiers were taken prisoner and up to 300 enemy soldiers and officers wiped out. Comrade Poyarov, directly with the combat formations of the battalions, communicated the decisions of the brigade commander to the subordinate formations, rendering practical assistance to unit commanders in the carrying out of the assigned objectives. Comrade Poyarov is a participant in all combat operations of the brigade. Comrade Poyarov is deserving of the award of the Order of the Red Banner.

Then-Lieutenant Colonel Poyarov was promoted to command the 126th Brigade in March 1943. He was assessed as a "tactically competent and strong-willed commander" for his leadership of the brigade. In May the brigade was shifted to the Western Front in the region of Pogoreloye Gorodishche, where it and the 128th Rifle Brigade merged to form the 199th Rifle Division with Poyarov becoming chief of staff. On 4 June Poyarov was promoted to command the division.

Poyarov was transferred to serve as chief of staff of the 81st Rifle Corps on 16 August. The corps took part in the Smolensk operation, the Yelnya-Dorogobuzh Offensive Operation, and the battles in the Vitebsk sector as part of the 68th, 5th, and 33rd Armies of the Western Front. Between 11 January and 2 February 1944 Poyarov temporarily commanded the corps. For his performance as corps chief of staff, corps commander Mikhail Yerokhin recommended him for the Order of Kutuzov, 2nd class, which was upgraded to the Order of the Red Banner and awarded on 7 March. The recommendation read:

Colonel Poyarov has been a participant in the Patriotic War since April 1942. During the entire period of his participation in battles he has had the positive quality of an officer of the Red Army. He commanded a rifle division for a long time, which fulfilled all the tasks of the army.

Colonel Poyarov has been corps chief of staff since August 1943. He managed to prepare the corps headquarters to carry out any task set by the command. In the fighting for the settlement of Bobrovo and the station of Krynyki, Colonel Poyarov showed himself to be a brave and decisive officer in battle, as a result of which the enemy strongpoints were taken and the corps objectives fulfilled.

Colonel Poyarov is a strong staff worker and organizer of battle. He is deserving of the state award of the Order of Kutuzov, 2nd class.

The corps was withdrawn to the Reserve of the Supreme High Command in April 1944, then shifted to the 2nd Belorussian Front. In June, corps commander Vasily Panyukhov evaluated Poyarov as follows:

Comrade Poyarov is a young, growing commander...He possesses great force of will and is demanding of himself and subordinates. Disciplined. Enjoys well-deserved authority. Skillfully organizes combined arms cooperation on the battlefield.

Poyarov was replaced as chief of staff on 17 June, and in July sent to complete an accelerated course at the Voroshilov Higher Military Academy. After graduating from the course in September, he was posted to the Allied Control Commission in Finland as chief of the Operations Section of its Military Department.

== Postwar ==
Poyarov continued to serve in his previous post until April 1946, then was appointed chief of the Military Department of the commission. After its disbandment he served as chief of staff of the 37th Guards Mechanized Division of the Leningrad Military District from November 1947. After completing the Special Course at the Voroshilov Higher Military Academy in 1950, he was appointed military adviser to an infantry division commander of the Hungarian People's Army. Returning to the Soviet Union, Poyarov took command of the Carpathian Military District's 97th Guards Rifle Division in September 1955, and was promoted to the rank of general-mayor on 27 August 1957. In September 1958 he was promoted to serve as deputy commander for combat training and chief of the combat training department of the 13th Army headquarters and in September 1960 rose to first deputy commander of the army. Poyarov was transferred to the Civil Defense Forces, serving as chief of the Northwestern Operational Zone of Civil Defense from 4 February 1965. In February 1967 he was moved down to first deputy senior chief and chief of staff of the zone. While still on active duty, he died in Leningrad on 25 September of that year, and was buried at the Bogoslovskoe Cemetery.

== Awards ==
Poyarov was a recipient of the following decorations:

- Order of Lenin
- Order of the Red Banner (3)
- Order of the Patriotic War, 1st class (2)
- Order of the Red Star
