= 53rd Rifle Corps =

- Branch: Soviet Red Army
- Engagements: Eastern Front (World War II); Operation Barbarossa

The 53rd Rifle Corps was a corps of the Soviet Red Army. It was part of the 24th Army. It took part in the Great Patriotic War.

After a brief period on occupation duty in Germany after the war ended, the 17th Rifle Division (III Formation) was returned to the Soviet Union in the Volga Military District at Yoshkar-Ola where it was reorganized as the 1st Rifle Brigade as part of the 53rd Rifle Corps. It was disbanded in March 1947.

== Divisions ==
- 107th Rifle Division
- 133rd Rifle Division
- 178th Rifle Division
