= 199th Rifle Division =

199th Rifle Division (April 4, 1941 - August 15, 1942) 199th Rifle Division (May 20, 1943 - June 18, 1945)
- Active: 1941–1945
- Country: Soviet Union
- Branch: Red Army
- Type: Infantry
- Size: Division
- Engagements: Operation Barbarossa; Battle of Kiev (1941); Case Blue; Smolensk operation Orsha offensives (1943); Operation Bagration; Mogilev offensive Osovets offensive Vistula–Oder offensive East Prussian offensive East Pomeranian offensive Battle of Berlin
- Decorations: Order of the Red Banner; Order of Suvorov 3rd class Order of Kutuzov (all 2nd formation)
- Battle honours: Smolensk (2nd formation)

Commanders
- Notable commanders: Col. Aleksandr Nikolaevich Alekseev; Kombrig Dmitrii Vasilevich Averin; Col. Fyodor Andreevich Verevkin; Col. Vasily Mikhailovich Larin; Col. Vasilii Yakovklevich Poyarov; Maj. Gen. Matveii Prokofevich Kononenko

The 199th Rifle Division was an infantry division of the Red Army, originally formed as part of the prewar buildup of forces, based on the shtat (table of organization and equipment) of September 13, 1939. After being formed in the far east of the USSR just months before the German invasion it was very soon moved to the Kiev Special Military District, where it was quickly assigned to the 49th Rifle Corps in the reserves of Southwestern Front. In fighting west of Kyiv it was separated from its Corps and suffered heavy casualties in early July. Later in the month it was subordinated to 26th Army as it retreated toward the Dniepr River, but after crossing south of Kyiv it was reassigned to 38th Army. It remained in this Army for the rest of its existence, retreating past Kharkiv during October and November. During the spring of 1942 it remained on the defense during the offensive near that city, but was forced to retreat in front of the German summer offensive. In early July it was encircled near Chertkovo and destroyed, although it remained on the books until mid-August.

A new 199th was formed in May 1943, based on a pair of rifle brigades, in the Moscow Military District. It was soon assigned to 68th Army in the Reserve of the Supreme High Command, which was then assigned to Western Front. During August and September it fought in Operation Suvorov and won a battle honor for the liberation of Smolensk. Following this victory it advanced westward and took part in the grinding battles of attrition east of Orsha for the remainder of the year. When 68th Army was disbanded in early November the 199th was moved to 5th Army, and then soon to 33rd Army. When these offensives proved futile the 33rd was shifted north and spent the winter and early spring of 1944 in the equally futile efforts to encircle Vitebsk from the southeast. When Western Front was disbanded in April the division was reassigned to 2nd Belorussian Front where it spent some weeks rebuilding before being assigned to 49th Army, where it remained for the duration. In the opening stages of the summer offensive it was involved in the fighting for Mogilev and the crossing of the Dniepr River, for which it was awarded the Order of Suvorov (unusually for a division, this was in the 3rd Degree) and later in the offensive it won the Order of the Red Banner for the liberation of Osovets Fortress. After the first phase of the Vistula-Oder Offensive in 1945 the division attacked into East Pomerania toward Gdańsk and two of its rifle regiments were also awarded the Red Banner. During the Berlin Offensive the 199th crossed both branches of the Oder River near Stettin before advancing through northeastern Germany and linking up with British forces. It received further honors after the German surrender, but was soon disbanded.

== 1st Formation ==
The division officially formed on April 4, 1941, in the Siberian Military District, but began moving west by rail in accordance with an order dated April 15. Once this was complete it was assigned to the Kiev Special Military District. As of June 22, 1941 it had the following order of battle:

- 492nd Rifle Regiment
- 584th Rifle Regiment
- 617th Rifle Regiment
- 500th Light Artillery Regiment
- 465th Howitzer Artillery Regiment (until November 30, 1941)
- 124th Antitank Battalion
- 408th Antiaircraft Battery (later 187th Antiaircraft Battalion)
- 257th Reconnaissance Battalion
- 335th Sapper Battalion
- 569th Signal Battalion
- 2nd Medical/Sanitation Battalion
- 178th Chemical Defense (Anti-gas) Company
- 336th Motor Transport Battalion (later 285th)
- 269th Field Bakery
- 32nd Divisional Veterinary Hospital
- 6th Field Artillery Workshop
- 705th Field Postal Station
- 591st Field Office of the State Bank

Col. Aleksandr Nikolaevich Alekseev was appointed to command the division on the day it began forming. When the German invasion began the division was in the reserves of Southwestern Front (the renamed Kiev District) as part of the 49th Rifle Corps, which also included the 190th and 197th Rifle Divisions. At the time the entire Corps was practising road marches in the area of Pohrebyshche in western Ukraine, but advance detachments of the division were near the border, working with cadets of the Vysokoye NCO Training School. They were attacked by the German 457th and 466th Infantry Regiments of Army Group South's spearhead. Fighting in the fields of grain was hand-to-hand, and so fierce that the German forces had to call in artillery support to make any headway. By June 28 the 199th was shoring up an antitank gun line that 12th and 26th Armies were trying to establish in front of the 1st Panzer Group.

== Battle of Kyiv ==
By the end of the day on July 7 the 199th had been separated from the rest of 49th Corps by a thrust of XIV Motorized Corps and was fighting along the Sluch River some 30km northwest of Chudniv. It suffered heavy losses in fighting near the settlement of Myropil. By July 10 the 49th Corps had been subordinated to 6th Army, still in Southwestern Front.

By the end of July 23 the division, still separated from its corps-mates, had retreated as far as positions some 20km west of Bohuslav. After a month of fighting, on July 29 the 199th had just 1,900 men remaining on strength. By the beginning of August the 49th Corps had been disbanded and the division had been subordinated directly to 26th Army, still in Southwestern Front. On August 1, Colonel Alekseev was removed from his command following a military tribunal where he was found guilty, along with his divisional commissar and deputy commander, of losing control of the division during the fighting at Myropil. He was replaced the next day by Kombrig Dmitrii Vasilevich Averin, who had been serving for the previous few weeks as commander of the Kyiv Fortified Area. By August 11 the 199th had dropped back to positions some 20km southwest of Kaniv. Within a few days the division crossed the Dniepr and became part of the new 38th Army, covering the southern flank of the Kyiv defensive sector. It was reinforced with cadres of several disbanded formations, including the 47th Tank Division.

At the start of September the 199th was in the vicinity of Kremenchuk, where 1st Panzer Group was engaged in forcing a bridgehead. As the river line was penetrated the XIV Motorized Corps forced the division eastward, and so it escaped the fate of the 26th and the rest of the armies that would soon be encircled east of Kyiv. By September 26, as the trapped armies were being wiped out, the division was located north of Krasnohrad. During October and November it took part in 38th Army's delaying action west and later east of Kharkiv. The city fell to German 6th Army on October 25 after five days of heavy fighting.

== Case Blue ==
On January 9, 1942, Kombrig Averin took over command of the 196th Rifle Division and was replaced by Col. Vsevolod Vladimirovich Davidov-Luchitskii. Averin would be killed in action at the head of the 196th on August 7. Davidov-Luchitskii left the division on March 8 and was replaced ten days later by Col. Fyodor Andreevich Verevkin, who remained in command for the duration of the 1st formation.

=== Operation Fridericus II ===
During the Second Battle of Kharkov the 199th remained on the defense while three other divisions and part of a fourth formed the Army's shock group. As 1st Panzer Army prepared for Operation Fridericus II, its preliminary to the main summer offensive, its main target was 38th Army, which contained six rifle divisions, including the 199th, the 1st Destroyer (Antitank) Division, six tank brigades and one motorized rifle brigade. After several delays due to thunderstorms the offensive began at 0410 hours on June 22. Over the next two days there was significant fighting for the town of Kupiansk, while the remnants of the 162nd, 199th, 278th and 304th Rifle Divisions made their way eastward out of encirclement and over the Oskil River to a new defensive line. However, the 60th Motorized Division had established a bridgehead over the river north of Kupiansk, which would be a jumping-off point for Case Blue.

=== Operation Blau II ===
On July 6, the XXXX Panzer Corps of 6th Army launched an advance to the south which quickly covered 25km, almost halfway to Rossosh, but soon ran short of fuel. Despite this, a battle group of 3rd Panzer Division managed to seize the town at dawn the next day, which unhinged Southwestern Front's defenses. The Front commander, Marshal S. K. Timoshenko, received permission from the STAVKA to withdraw 38th Army from its exposed positions. The commander of 38th Army, Maj. Gen. K. S. Moskalenko, later wrote in his memoirs:

Twenty-four hours after receipt of the order concerning 38th Army's withdrawal, it was withdrawn to that line [35-40km east of the Oskil]. However, by this time, the situation had once again changed, again for the worse.

On July 8 the XXXX Panzer Corps continued its southward advance with 100 tanks. This deep thrust threatened to envelop both 38th and 28th Armies, as well as many rear service elements of the Front.

Advancing headlong, XXXX Panzer reached the crossings over the Kalitva River, preempting a special combat group that 28th Army had formed to defend them, and in the process creating an even wider gap between that Army and the 38th. On July 8, the XXXX Panzer dispatched its three divisions, – which Moskalenko believed had a total of 300 tanks – southward into the gap toward Kantemirovka. Moskalenko requested permission to withdraw his forces farther east to the Aidar River, while a portion of his Army covered 28th Army's eastward escape. Timoshenko approved the latter but turned down the former. Moskalenko now formed a combat group consisting of the 304th, 199th, and 9th Guards Rifle Divisions, plus the 3rd Tank Brigade, and sent it northeast to form a protective screen between Rovenky and Kantemirovka. However, early on July 9 the panzers drove into the latter before the combat group could reach it.

The day before, a second large German axe had begun to fall on 38th Army, and indeed on the entire Southwestern Front. The commander of Army Group South, Field Marshal F. von Bock, realizing that 38th and 9th Armies were beginning to withdraw, authorized the infantry forces on 1st Panzer Army's right wing and center to advance across the Oskil and then eastward along the Northern Donets River in pursuit. The XI and XXXXIV Army Corps soon advanced 10-15km eastward and reached the approaches to the Krasnaya River. The XIV Panzer Corps also attacked at dawn on July 9. Faced with mounting threats on both of his flanks, Moskalenko sent an urgent message to Timoshenko and the STAVKA, requesting they approve his further withdrawal. This was refused. To a further message at 1600 hours he got no reply due to a communications failure, so at 2000 he issued withdrawal orders on his own authority.

In order to escape the Army's forces would have to cross a broad corridor carved out by XXXX Panzer Corps, which would prove impossible for most formed units, although many small groups and individuals had greater luck. Most of the Army was trapped between the Aidar and the Chertkovo Rivers. A radio message from 38th Army reported that the 199th was attacked by German tanks in the Chertkovo region at 1000 hours on July 11. German intelligence identified the division as part of the "bag", and by the end of July it disappeared from the Soviet order of battle, being officially disbanded on August 15.

== 2nd Formation ==
A new 199th Rifle Division was formed on May 20, 1943, near Kalinin in the Moscow Military District, based on two rifle brigades.

=== 126th Rifle Brigade ===
This brigade was formed from December 1941 to April 1942 in the Ural Military District, and was assigned to the Reserve of the Supreme High Command by the end of April. In May it was assigned to 11th Army in Northwestern Front, on the northern flank of the Demyansk pocket, and it remained in this Army for almost a year. After the Demyansk area was evacuated by German II Army Corps in February 1943, in April, the 126th went back to the Reserve of the Supreme High Command in 27th Army. It was under this command when it was disbanded to help form the 199th.

=== 128th Rifle Brigade ===
This was another brigade that started forming in December 1941 in the Ural Military District. It remained in the District until May 1942, when it was sent to Western Front and assigned to the 7th Guards Rifle Corps in the Front reserves. In August it was assigned to 33rd Army in the same Front, and in September it was returned to 7th Guards Corps in the same Army. At the beginning of 1943 it was again placed in the Front reserves, before moving in February to the 8th Guards Rifle Corps in 10th Army. This Corps was reassigned to 16th Army in March, and the brigade made its final transfer in April, now to 50th Army, still in Western Front. In early May it went into the Reserve of the Supreme High Command, where it was merged with the 126th Brigade to form the new 199th.

When the division completed forming, it had an order of battle quite similar to that of the 1st formation:

- 492nd Rifle Regiment
- 584th Rifle Regiment
- 617th Rifle Regiment
- 500th Artillery Regiment
- 124th Antitank Battalion
- 257th Reconnaissance Battalion
- 335th Sapper Battalion
- 569th Signal Battalion (later 260th Signal Company)
- 2nd Medical/Sanitation Battalion
- 178th Chemical Defense (Anti-gas) Company
- 285th Motor Transport Company (later 336th)
- 269th Field Bakery
- 32nd Divisional Veterinary Hospital
- 1773rd Field Postal Station
- 1730th Field Office of the State Bank

Col. Vasily Mikhailovich Larin was appointed as commander on the day the division was formed, but he left this command on June 4; he would later lead the 98th Guards Rifle Division. He was replaced by Col. . By the beginning of June the division was assigned to 68th Army, still in the Reserve of the Supreme High Command. In July, just before the start of the summer offensive, the Army was assigned to Western Front.

== Battle of Smolensk ==
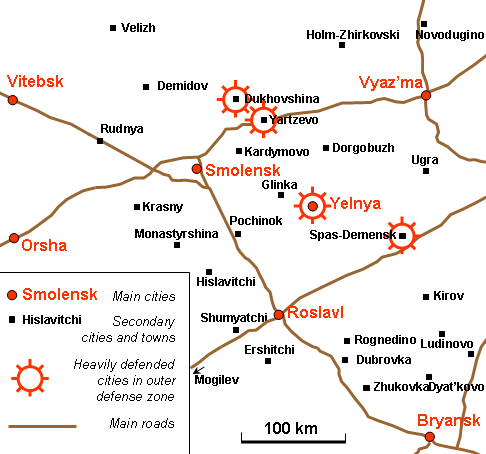
General layout of the Smolensk region during the offensive

Operation Suvorov began on August 7 with a preliminary bombardment at 0440 hours and a ground assault at 0630. By this time the 199th was in 81st Rifle Corps with the 192nd Rifle Division. The commander of Western Front, Col. Gen. V. D. Sokolovskii, committed his 5th, 10th Guards, and 33rd Armies in the initial assault, while 68th Army was in second echelon. The attack quickly encountered heavy opposition and stalled. By early afternoon, Sokolovskii became concerned about the inability of most of his units to advance and decided to commit part of 68th Army to reinforce the push by 10th Guards Army against XII Army Corps. This was a premature and foolish decision on a number of levels, crowding an already stalled front with even more troops and vehicles.

On the morning of August 8, Sokolovskii resumed his offensive at 0730 hours, but now he had three armies tangled up on the main axis of advance. After a 30-minute artillery preparation the Soviets resumed their attacks across a 10km-wide front. 81st Corps was inserted between the two engaged corps of 10th Guards, putting further pressure on the 488th Grenadier Regiment of 268th Infantry Division. Reinforcements from 2nd Panzer Division were coming up from Yelnya in support. The next day, 10th Guards almost clawed its way onto Hill 233.3, but was thrown back by a furious German counterattack. The hill was finally overwhelmed by a massive attack on the evening of August 10. By the next day it became clear that XII Corps was running out of infantry and so late in the day the German forces began falling back toward the Yelnya–Spas-Demensk railway. By now Western Front had expended nearly all its artillery ammunition and was not able to immediately exploit the withdrawal. Sokolovskii was authorized to temporarily suspend Suvorov on August 21. On August 16, Colonel Poyarov left his command, and became chief of staff of 81st Corps in September. He was replaced by Col. Matvei Prokopevich Kononenko. This officer was returning to service after holding regimental and brigade commands in 1941 and would be promoted to the rank of major general on February 22, 1944.

=== Yelnya Offensive ===
Sokolovskii was given just one week to reorganize for the next push. In the new plan the 10th Guards, 21st, 33rd and 68th Armies would make the main effort, attacking XII Corps all along its front until it shattered, then push mobile groups through the gaps to seize Yelnya. It kicked off on August 28 with a 90-minute artillery preparation across a 25km-wide front, but did not initially include 68th Army. A gap soon appeared in the German front in 33rd Army's sector, and the 5th Mechanized Corps was committed. On the second day this Corps achieved a breakthrough and Yelnya was liberated on August 30. By this time the attacking rifle divisions were reduced to 3,000 men or fewer. By September 1 the 199th had been reassigned to 72nd Rifle Corps, still in 68th Army.

=== Advance to Smolensk ===
The offensive was again suspended on September 7, with one week allowed for logistical replenishment. When it resumed on September 15, German 4th Army was expected to hold a 164km front with fewer than 30,000 troops. Sokolovskii prepared to make his main effort with the same four armies against IX Army Corps' positions west of Yelnya; the Corps had five decimated divisions to defend a 40km-wide front. At 0545 hours a 90-minute artillery preparation began, followed by intense bombing attacks. When the ground attack began the main effort was directed south of the Yelnya–Smolensk railway, near the town of Leonovo. After making gains the attacks resumed at 0630 on September 16. 68th Army continued probing attacks against 35th and 252nd Infantry Divisions, and although the IX Corps was not broken after two days, it was ordered to withdraw to the next line of defense overnight on September 16/17. Sokolovskii intended to pursue the left wing of the Corps and approach Smolensk from the south with the 68th, 10th Guards, and most of his armor.

By September 18, the 4th Army was falling back to the Hubertus-II-Stellung with Western Front in pursuit. On paper, this line offered the potential to mount a last-minute defense of Smolensk, but only very basic fieldworks actually existed. By now IX Corps was a broken and retreating formation. In the event, the converging Soviet armies had to pause for a few days outside the city before making the final push. On the morning of September 22 the 68th Army achieved a clear breakthrough south-east of Smolensk, in the sector held by remnants of 35th Infantry. By the next morning it was clear that the Hubertus-III-Stellung could not be held. The commander of 4th Army made preparations to evacuate the city. During the afternoon of September 24 the 72nd Corps pushed back the 337th Infantry Division. Sokolovskii knew that 4th Army was not likely to fight for Smolensk and he wanted the city secured before it was completely destroyed. At 1000 hours the next day the Corps advanced into the southern part of the city and linked up with units of 5th and 31st Armies. The division was recognized with a battle honor:

SMOLENSK - 199th Rifle Division (Colonel Kononenko, Matvei Prokopevich)... The troops who participated in the battles of Smolensk and Roslavl, by the order of the Supreme High Command of September 25, 1943, and a commendation in Moscow, are given a salute of 20 artillery salvoes from 224 guns.

4th Army fell back to the Dora-Stellung overnight on September 26/27. The onus of pursuit along the Minsk–Moscow Highway fell on the 5th and 68th Armies as more battle-weary armies were pulled out of the line to regroup.

== Orsha Offensives ==
By October 3, 68th Army had reached a front extending from the southern bank of the Dniepr south of Vizhimaki south along the Myareya River to Lyady. The 192nd and 199th Divisions of 72nd Corps, plus the 159th Rifle Division and 6th Guards Cavalry Division attacked the German positions at Filaty on the Myareya. The 18th Panzer Grenadier Division was overextended and hard-pressed, and when, late on October 8, the 159th and 88th Rifle Divisions assaulted across the river it was forced westward. Pursued by forward detachments of the Army's lead divisions the panzer grenadiers took up new positions on October 11 along the Rossasenka River. The 68th prepared to resume its assaults on October 12, but due to transfers to 31st Army it was now reduced to just three divisions (192nd, 199th, 159th).

=== Second Orsha Offensive ===
Encouraged by some modest successes along the Smolensk–Orsha road, Sokolovskii ordered his forces to resume operations early on October 12. The three divisions of 68th Army were tasked with defending the left flank of 31st Army, south of the Dniepr. The attack began with an artillery preparation which the German forces were expecting; falling back to the second line of trenches they escaped any significant casualties and the offensive faltered almost immediately. Fighting continued until October 18 but the gains were no more than 1,500m at the cost to the Front of 5,858 killed and 17,478 wounded. This was followed by another major regrouping and by the beginning of November the 199th was back in 81st Corps, which was transferred to 5th Army when the 68th was disbanded on November 5.

=== Fourth and Fifth Orsha Offensives ===
Sokolovskii submitted his plan for a renewed offensive to the STAVKA on November 9. The second shock group would be made up of 5th and 33rd Armies in triple-echelon formation attacking south of the Dniepr toward Dubrowna and Orsha. It was to begin on November 14 following a three-an-a-half artillery and air preparation. The overall offensive front was 25km-wide and 81st Corps faced the 18th Panzergrenadiers plus the 260th Infantry Regiment. When it began the Corps fought successfully until its assault faltered on the northern approaches to Bobrovna. The assault was renewed the next day but Bobrovna and the heights west of the Rossasenka continued to hold out, largely because of determined counterattacks in battalion strength. The fighting continued for three more days in the face of stiffening German resistance. Finally, by committing the fresh 144th Rifle Division a 10km-wide and 3-4km-deep bridgehead over the Rossasenka had been driven by the end of November 18. This was one of the deepest penetrations made during the offensive, which cost a further 9,167 killed and 28,589 wounded among the four armies involved. A fifth offensive took place from November 30 until December 5, through wet snow that turned the roads into slurry. Elements of 5th Army finally managed to seize Bobrovna on December 2 but German reserves prevented any further advance. By now the Army's divisions varied from 3,088 to 4,095 personnel. Following these successive failures Sokolovskii soon ordered his forces to regroup to the north to join 1st Baltic Front in a fresh effort to take Vitebsk. While this regrouping went on later in December the 199th was reassigned to 36th Rifle Corps in 33rd Army.

== Battles for Vitebsk ==
When the redeployment and regrouping were through on December 22 the Army had 13 rifle divisions on strength, supported by one tank corps, four tank brigades, and ten tank and self-propelled artillery regiments, plus substantial artillery. The attack began the following day in cooperation with 39th Army. The 36th Corps (215th, 199th, 274th Rifle Divisions with 256th Tank Brigade in support) was deployed on a sector from Khotemle to Arguny, facing elements of the 246th Infantry Division of 3rd Panzer Army's VI Army Corps.

Initially, on December 23 33rd Army's shock groups pushed the defenders back about 1,000m between Kovaleva and Arguny at the junction of the 246th and 206th Infantry Divisions. The next day, however, the 65th, 36th, and 81st Corps committed their second echelon divisions and succeeded in enlarging the penetration to a depth of 2-3km, threatening to split the two divisions. A battlegroup of Panzer-Grenadier-Division Feldherrnhalle intervened but despite this on December 25 the entire 33rd Army burst forward from 2-7km, disrupted the German counterattack, and reached and severed the Smolensk–Vitebsk railroad line, 20km southeast of Vitebsk's central square. The advance continued on December 26 when elements of 199th and 215th Divisions fought for the village of Zakhodniki, situated west of the rail line, only 2km east of the Vitebsk–Orsha and 15km south of the city. After this, intense fighting raged for two days in the Maklaki region as the Feldherrnhalle group struggled to prevent the Soviet force from cutting its critical supply artery.

Under unrelenting STAVKA pressure, 33rd Army continued its assaults on January 1, 1944. The Army commander, Col. Gen. V. N. Gordov, created a new shock group based on 36th Corps. The 199th and 274th Divisions were in first echelon between Gribuny and Kopti, with the 215th in second echelon. Sokolovskii assigned two more divisions to the Corps the next day and Gordov planned to commit the 371st Rifle Division at the junction of the 199th and 274th to spearhead the advance on Sosnovka. The shock group was to penetrate the defenses along the Vitebsk–Orsha road and advance westward, cross the Luchesa River, and advance along the Sosnovka, Ostrovno and Diaglevo axis to link up with 1st Baltic Front and encircle 3rd Panzer Army. It struck at dawn on January 1 despite a heavy snowstorm that gripped the entire region. In the following five days of heavy fighting the shock group expanded the penetration about 1,000m westward toward the Vitebsk–Orsha road, forcing the 3rd Panzer to commit its reserve 131st Infantry Division to contain the assault just short of the road. During this fighting the 199th and 371st captured Gribuny, reaching within rifle shot of the road. On January 6, the STAVKA reluctantly approved Sokolovskii's request to call a temporary halt.

The next effort began on January 8, with 5th and 39th Armies joining the 33rd. 36th Corps again formed Gordov's shock group and was ordered to attack the defenses of the 131st Infantry and Feldherrnhalle in the 6km-wide sector between Gribuny and Maklaki. The 199th, 371st, 274th and 95th Rifle Divisions in first echelon, backed by the 215th, and further supported by four tank brigades. The plan for exploitation remained similar to that of the previous assault. Two divisions of 65th Corps were to support the 199th if and when it reached the Luchesa. By now all the rifle divisions of Western Front were at less than 40 percent strength.

36th Corps' assault achieved significant initial success. Although the 199th failed to take either Gribuny or Starintsy, the remaining three first echelon divisions surged forward and penetrated Feldherrnhalle's defenses along a 6km front. In two days of fighting the 371st Division crushed a small salient defended by a battalion of Feldherrnhalle's Fusilier Regiment and advanced a further 2km, while the 274th and 95th gained up to 4km. However, the Germans reacted quickly to thwart the fresh Soviet successes and denied them the opportunity to conduct an exploitation with their tank corps. By late on January 14, 36th Corps' assaults had completely burned themselves out, and the divisions were down to 2,500 to 3,500 personnel each. In preparation for a renewal of the offensive the next day, southward toward Krynki Sokolovskii transferred the 199th to 72nd Rifle Corps in 5th Army.

After it was concentrated for the attack on the 6km-wide sector from Zyzyby eastward to Mialfi the 5th Army shock group consisted of the 199th, 159th, and 157th Rifle Divisions. The objective was to throw the German forces beyond the Sukhodrovka River with the 199th and 159th, supported by 26th Tank Brigade, and, in the event of success, capture Vysochany. It began on the night of January 14/15 in bitter cold and blizzard conditions which interfered with observation. The 617th Rifle Regiment, reinforced with four tanks, was committed to combat at 0500 hours on January 16, but did not achieve success. It fended off several counterattacks but then came under heavy fire which drove the riflemen to ground. After an artillery raid the regiment, with several T-34 tanks, and this time it succeeded in taking the village of Shvedy, driving the defenders back to the Sukhodrovka. Through several days of heavy fighting the shock group took Krynki and drove the German forces back about 2km east of that point.

After regrouping his forces one more time the commander of 5th Army, Lt. Gen. N. I. Krylov, sent the 199th and 157th Divisions, this time supported by the 274th Division and elements of 45th Corps, back to the attack on January 20. This combined force drove German forces away from the railroad sector from Miafli to Leutino and advanced to the northern approaches of the villages of Shugaevo and Kriukovo. At this point Western Front's January offensive came to an end. Over 16 days of combat it had suffered more than 25,000 casualties, including more than 5,500 dead, while advancing anywhere from 2-4km. Within days the 199th had returned to 81st Corps, which was now under 33rd Army.

=== Fighting for the Luchesa ===
Sokolovskii was now ordered to shift the axis of his attacks northward toward Vitebsk itself. 33rd Army would form the most important shock group, with a single echelon of all four rifle corps deployed on a 16km front from Ugliane southward to Shelai. Gordov designated 81st and 36th Corps to conduct the critical assault toward and across the Luchesa on his shock group's left wing. Within 81st Corps the 95th Division was in first echelon and the 199th in second, and they were to attack on a 4km front from the Vitebsk–Orsha railroad to south of Gribuny against the defenses of 131st Infantry. A diversion was mounted by two divisions of 5th Army on February 2, but this failed to attract much German attention. The main offensive kicked off at dawn on February 3 with an artillery preparation that proved largely ineffective due to ammunition shortages. Despite this, Gordov's shock group achieved immediate success by breaking through the defenses and advancing up to 2km across its entire front. 95th Division, supported by a tank brigade, fought its way across the highway and captured the strongpoints at Dymanovo and Starintsy. After advancing almost 2.5km further it approached the eastern bank of the Luchesa east of Porotkovo, just 10km south of Vitebsk. The 199th followed in its wake.

Gordov ordered his corps commanders on February 4 to begin committing their second echelon divisions to expand the penetration and, in particular, to seize crossings over the Luchesa. Although partly frozen, the river was almost 50m wide, 1.5m-4.5m deep, and had banks with 45-60 degrees of slope, making it a formidable obstacle for both tanks and infantry. The fresh assault was preceded by a 10-15-minute artillery raid. This led to a see-saw battle that raged along the river for three days for the possession of critical bridgeheads. The 199th was committed early on the right of the 95th with orders to drive across the river east of Porotkovo. However, it was unable to crush the German forces defending their own bridgehead at Noviki, nor was the 95th able to force a crossing of its own. A virtual stalemate continued to exist on February 7, and the cost to the attackers of 39th and 33rd Armies from February 4 to 6 was more than 3,600 men killed or wounded. After failing to break cleanly through the defenses after five days of combat, Sokolovskii and Gordov desperately sought a weak place in VI Corps' defenses. The 65th Corps was moved to new attack positions west of the Vitebsk–Orsha railroad to launch a concerted assault with 81st Corps against the bridgehead at Noviki. Five more days of fighting began on February 8, and finally on February 11 succeeded in crossing the river northwest of Starintsy and seizing a lodgment at the village of Mikhailovo. After repelling numerous counterattacks the 95th and 164th Rifle Divisions managed to carve out a 2km-deep bridgehead based on Mikhailovo, while the 199th captured Noviki but left two smaller German bridgeheads intact north and south of Bukshtyny. Although Gordov insisted on continuing the assault for three more days after February 13 it proved utterly futile due to the attrition to the attacking forces.

Later in February the 199th was transferred 65th Corps, joining the 371st Division. On February 28 it was located north of Bukshtyny. Sokolovskii was now planning for a renewed offensive across the Luchesa, again using the 33rd Army as his main shock group. 65th Corps was to force a crossing near Noviki and capture Sosnovka. Altogether, nine rifle divisions of the Army were concentrated on the Luchesa front, supported by six tank brigades with 87 tanks. These faced the 197th and 299th Infantry Divisions of VI Corps.

Before the assault could begin the commander of the 3rd Panzer Army, Col. Gen. G.-H. Reinhardt, disrupted the plan by shortening his defensive line around the city. The STAVKA took this as a preliminary to a full withdrawal from the Vitebsk salient, and ordered a pursuit. At dawn on February 28 the three rifle corps of 33rd Army struck hard at VI Corps along and forward of the Luchesa after an artillery preparation. From the very outset the battle proved both intense and largely futile for Sokolovskii. The 199th and 144th Divisions captured the German bridgehead at Bukshtyny and then, on March 1, jointly forced their way across the Luchesa, seizing a small lodgment on the west bank on the approaches to Shuki. The heavy fighting raged on at Shuki through March 3-5 as Gordov concentrated all his available forces in an attempt to enlarge the bridgehead. However, Reinhardt reinforced the threatened sector with a battlegroup from 299th Infantry plus several battalions from 5th Jäger Division. These reinforcements finally counterattacked and recaptured most, although not all, of the bridgehead. With the Army's second echelon divisions already sent north for the "pursuit" there was nothing Gordov and Sokolovskii could do but look on in dismay. By March 5 the offensive ground to a halt after only minimal gains.

=== Bogushevsk Offensive ===
On March 13 the STAVKA relieved General Gordov of command of 33rd Army, replacing him with Col. Gen. I. Ye. Petrov. For the next effort to complete the encirclement of Vitebsk, Western Front was to attack in the direction of Bogushevsk. Sokolovskii returned to his strategy of mid-January, planning to expand the salient southeast of Vitebsk farther to the south, this time employing three rifle corps on a 12km-wide front, supported by two tank brigades. The 199th was now in 36th Rifle Corps, with the 215th and 277th Divisions, and was deployed in second echelon. The assault began at dawn on March 21 and collapsed the German defenses on the entire front from Makarova to Diakovina, allowing penetrations of up to 4km. The next day the 215th and 277th captured two strongpoints, forcing a withdrawal of another 1,000m, but the adjacent corps were stalled. On March 23, the 199th was committed and helped the rest of the Corps to penetrated the defenses of 14th Infantry Division, capturing Sharki, Kuzmentsy, and Efremenki, and advancing up to another 1,000m toward Buraki. 3rd Panzer Army barely managed to contain the attack by committing reserves west of Cherkassy. Fighting continued until March 29 but by the 27th it was clear to both sides that the offensive had faltered. Furthermore, given losses of 20,630 men from March 21-30 there was nothing he could do to reinvigorate it.

== Operation Bagration ==
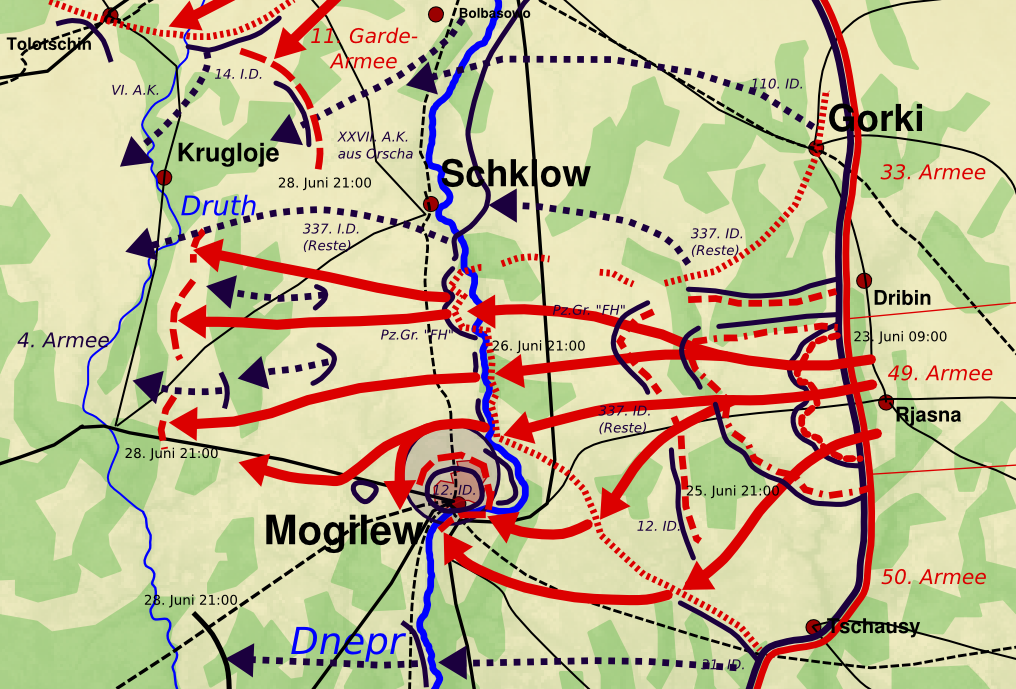
Operation Bagration, Mogilev sector

On April 24, Western Front was split into 2nd and 3rd Belorussian Fronts, with 33rd Army going to the former. By the beginning of May the 199th was under direct command of the Army, and by a month later under direct command of the Front. During June it was transferred to the 70th Rifle Corps of 49th Army, and it would remain in 49th Army of 2nd Belorussian Front for the duration of the war.

The Front was under command of Col. Gen. G. F. Zakharov, and its primary task in the summer offensive would be the liberation of Mogilev, while also pinning the good-quality divisions of XXXIX Panzer Corps to prevent them reinforcing other sectors. Of the Front's three armies (33rd, 50th, and 49th) the latter had by far the preponderance of forces, as it was intended to take the city and to advance along the one good highway through the marsh country to the west. It faced the 337th and 12th Infantry Divisions.

At 0600 hours on June 22, preceded by a 30-minute artillery barrage, a company from each of the Army's front-line divisions attacked the sectors of the two German divisions to determine the extent of the defenses. During the night of June 22/23, heavy air attacks by 4th Air Army on the German main line of resistance muffled the sound of Soviet tanks and self-propelled guns moving into position. Morning fog delayed the attack until 0700 when a 2-hour artillery bombardment successfully silenced the German artillery. Infantry, backed by 200 tanks, jumped off at 0900 in the 337th Infantry's sector, overrunning all three trench lines of the main defense zone, crossing the Pronia River. The 337th lost six artillery batteries, indicating its infantrymen had been overwhelmed before the guns could retreat. By noon the Army had advanced 4-6km, but the tanks and self-propelled guns had difficulty in crossing the Pronia because the two bridges in the area had been demolished.

When the corps' offensive in the sector of the 250th Infantry Regiment of the 337th Infantry Division began at 1100 on 23 June, the 199th began advancing in the 70th Rifle Corps' second echelon, behind the 290th Rifle Division. The 199th crossed the Pronia on the line of Zalozhye and Budino and by 1400 reached the first line of German trenches north and west of Budino. By the end of the day it reached the line of Suslovka, and Dalyekiye Nivy without loss.

In the evening, German counterattacks halted the Soviet advance. At 2145 hours the Feldherrnhalle Division was ordered to defend 20km of the 337th Division's sector. By the same time the Army had expanded its penetration to a depth of 8km on a 12km front. On the morning of June 24 the 49th Army, supported by 121st Rifle Corps of 50th Army, renewed the assault against both divisions following a massive 30-minute artillery preparation.

The division engaged in fighting from 0600 on 24 June, with the 617th Rifle Regiment taking Suslovka and advancing on Goreminy and Zhakovka. The 492nd Rifle Regiment reached the line south of Suslovka and continued towards the southern outskirts of Zhakovka. The 584th Rifle Regiment was kept in reserve in preparation to advance behind the 617th Rifle Regiment. By 1000 the 617th was fighting for Hill 194.9, and the 492nd for the southern outskirts of Zhakovka. By 20:00 the 617th was fighting a fire battle 500 meters east of Suslovka, and the 492nd in the forest 600 meters south of Suslovka.

By noon a gap in the defense had been opened east of Chernevka; the 337th had lost most of its artillery and was disintegrating, and a forward detachment of 42nd Rifle Division, with the rest of 69th Rifle Corps following, reached the town at 1700 and made a crossing of the Basia River. The assault continued the next day at 0600 and by midnight the Army was approaching the Dniepr bridges at Mogilev and crossings began on the morning of June 26.

On 25 June, the 617th engaged in intense fighting on the west bank of the Basya river on the northern outskirts of Slasteny and the hill east of Kirkory from 0600. A battalion of the 584th fought on the bank west of the Basya in the region of Selishchye, while another battalion fought for Khilkovichi, repulsing a German counterattack estimated at company size. The 492nd fought on the line of the Khilkovichi road, the khutor 1.5 kilometers and southwest of Khilkovichi. The division mobile detachment reached the region 200 meters northwest of the khutor, a kilometer west of the river. Continuing to pursue the retreating Germans, the 199th captured Kirkory, Slasteny, Khilkovichi, Poplavy and Paskanitsa, and by 1300 the 617th reached the forest a kilometer southwest of Kirkory, the 492nd the forest 300 meters west of Poplavy, and the 584th and mobile detachment the western edge of the forest northeast of Sukhari. During the day, the division encountered rifle and machine gun fire and infantry counterattacks on the hills north of Kirkory, with particularly strong artillery fire noted from the forest southwest of Slasteny, and self-propelled guns and infantry moving from Slasteny to Khilkovichi.

On 26 June, by 0800, the 617th was on the west bank of the Basya, 700 meters northeast of Slasteny, while a battalion of the 584th forced a crossing of the Basya in the region of the khutor of Ginya. At the same time, two battalions of the 492nd reached the line 500 meters south of Khilkovichi, while the remaining battalion fought on the northwest outskirts of Khilkovichi. Repulsing German counterattacks, the 199th reached the following line by 1200: the 617th on the west edge of the forest southeast of Bushko, the 584th northwest of Poplavy, and the 492nd in front of a stream west of Poplavy. The 199th continued the offensive and by 2100 to battalions of the 492nd, one battalion of the 617th and the division reconnaissance company forced the Dnieper on the line of Kolesishche and Pavlovka, and consolidated 200 to 300 meters west of the right bank of the Dnieper with the remaining units coming up behind them. During the night the 617th and 492nd seized four German trenches, reaching positions 500 meters east of Hill 188 near Polykovichi.

By that evening the 49th was across the Dniepr in force, and the commander of German 4th Army was finally given the order to evacuate the east bank of the river, but by this time the five divisions there had been chewed up and could no longer escape. At 0630 on June 27 the Army continued to drive back the remnants of the 337th and Feldherrnhalle north of Mogilev. The only hope left to 4th Army was to retreat faster than the Red Army could follow. On June 28 Mogilev fell to a combined attack by 49th and 50th Armies. On July 10 the division would be awarded the Order of Suvorov, 3rd Degree, for its part in the liberation of Mogilev, Shklow and Bykhaw and the crossings of the Pronia and Dniepr. At 1745 hours the commander of 4th Army was finally ordered to retreat behind the Berezina as quickly as possible due to the disasters that had unfolded at Orsha and Babruysk but this was far too late.

=== Pursuit toward Poland ===
In order to complete the pursuit of the defeated German forces, late on June 28 the STAVKA directed 2nd Belorussian Front to develop a rapid offensive in the direction of Minsk, capture that place, and reach the west bank of the Svislach River no later than July 8, in conjunction with 3rd Belorussian Front. During June 29-30 the 49th forced a crossing of the Drut River and was pursuing along the Mogilev–Minsk road. By the end of the second day the 2nd Belorussians's main forces were 25-30km from the Berezina. On July 1 the 49th's forward detachments encountered stubborn resistance in the Pahost area and were forced to wage heavy fighting to capture the crossings over the Berezina near Berezino.

On July 3 the Front's pursuit continued. 49th Army completed forcing the Berezina, occupied Byerazino, and advanced another 25-40km to the west. On the same day Minsk was liberated and most of what remained of Army Group Center was completely encircled. On July 9, the Army was tasked with the elimination of this pocket, in what was called the Osovets Offensive. The 199th was not part of the special force assigned to combing the forests and swamps for fugitives, but, nevertheless, on September 1 it was awarded the Order of the Red Banner for its successes in the operation. On August 23, General Kononenko handed his command over to Maj. Gen. Nikolai Kuzmich Maslennikov, but returned on September 14.

== Into Poland and Germany ==
During September the 199th was assigned to the 121st Rifle Corps, where it would remain for the duration, except for a few brief stints as a separate division. In the advance into Poland it reached as far as the Narew River, where it would remain until the start of the winter offensive. In the planning for the Vistula-Oder Offensive, the Front's 3rd Army was to launch an attack along its left flank on a 6km front, in the general direction of Janowo and Allenstein; 49th Army, while securely defending the Narew line from Novogrod to Chelsty with one corps would take advantage of 3rd Army's breakthrough to attack with its own main forces in the direction of Myszyniec. 121st Corps now comprised the 199th and 380th Rifle Divisions.

The offensive began on January 14, 1945, in conditions of poor visibility. 3rd Army crushed the resistance of the German units facing it, breaking through to a depth of 5km on a 10km front and creating the conditions for the 49th Army to follow. On January 16 the 49th continued attacking along its left flank but ran into stubborn enemy resistance and gained only 2-3km during the day. Combat continued through the night and on the next day the 121st Corps, supported by artillery and aviation, advanced another 4-5km and reached a line from 12km north of Różan to 14km northwest of the same point. On January 18, the last day of the first phase of the offensive, the units of 49th Army continued to attack along the west bank of the Narew.

=== East Pomeranian Offensive ===
By February 10, 121st and 70th Corps relieved the forces of 70th Army on the left bank of the Vistula River along the line Kulm - Grodek - Sierosław - Lniano in preparation for the offensive into eastern Pomerania. On February 19 the 49th Army was ordered to continue its attack in the direction of Sominy and Bytów, with the task of capturing the line Sominy - Kloden - the Liaskasee by the end of February 24. This advance brought the Army's forces to the approaches to Gdańsk, and during the fourth stage of the offensive, from March 14 to 30, the 49th was one of the armies that cleared and occupied the city. On April 5 the 492nd and 617th Rifle Regiments would each receive the Order of the Red Banner for the fighting that captured Czersk.

== Berlin Offensive ==
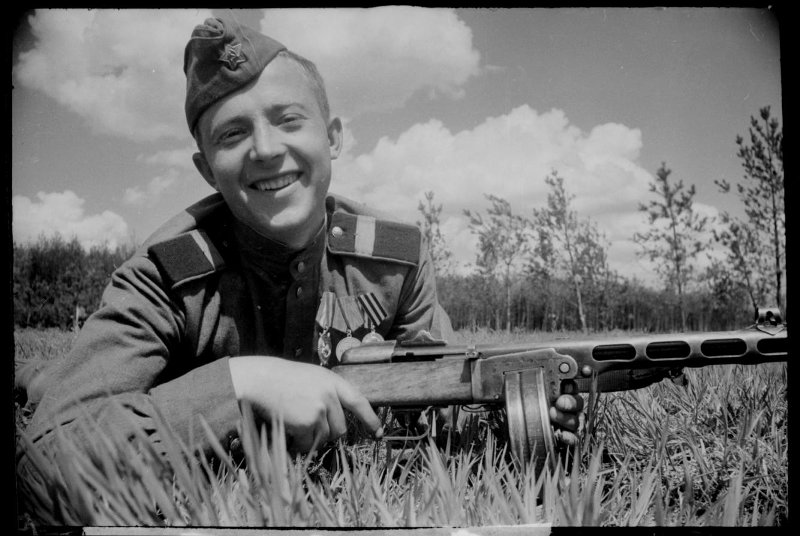
Senior Sergeant Graf Petrovich Melnikov (born 1926), a squad leader of the 584th Rifle Regiment awarded the Order of the Red Banner for his valor during the crossing of the Oder on 23 April

At the start of the Berlin Strategic Offensive the rifle divisions of 2nd Belorussian Front varied in strength from 3,600 to 4,800 personnel each. 49th Army deployed on a 16km front on the Oder River from Kranzfelde to Nipperwiese. The 121st Corps had the 380th and 42nd Divisions in the first echelon and the 199th in the second. During April 18/19 the Front launched intensive reconnaissance efforts in preparation for the crossings, including the elimination of German advance parties in the lowlands between the East and West Oder. On April 22 the division was able to get four battalions across to the west bank of the West Oder. The next day the operation continued, hindered by heavy German fire. In the Army's zone three ferry crossings, a 50-ton and a 16-ton bridge were in operation. During the day two regiments of the 380th and the remaining five rifle battalions of the 199th were crossed. On April 25 the 49th Army exploited the greater success of the 65th and 70th Armies in their crossing operations and passed its remaining forces to the west bank along the Harz sector using the 70th Army's ferries. Attacking to the southwest and having beaten off five German counterattacks the Army advanced 5–6km in the day's fighting, and by the evening the 121st Corps had reached the line Pinnow–Hohenfelde. Throughout April 29–30, 49th Army attacked to the west, beginning in the Neustrelitz area, and on May 3 its forward detachments established contact with British Second Army advance units in the Grabow area.

== Postwar ==
Late on May 6 the division handed over its defense sector to the 380th and concentrated in the region of Karrenzin, where it encamped and conducted training. From May 8-10 one battalion from each regiment combed through the local villages to detain "suspicious persons" and wandering German soldiers. Between May 7-10 the division took 1,415 German soldiers and officers prisoner, and detained 678 civilians. After the end of the war on May 9 the division continued training, and on May 28 paraded before the Army command, receiving awards and banners. The division marched east to the region of Zerlanghutte, Adamswalde, and Grosszerlang between June 1-4, where it encamped.

On the latter date the division was awarded the Order of Kutuzov, 2nd Degree, for its part in the capture of Stettin, Penkun, Casekow, and other places; the 500th Artillery Regiment also won the Order of Suvorov, 3rd Degree, for the same actions. At the same time, for their roles in the fighting for Fürstenberg and other towns, the 124th Antitank Battalion and 569th Signal Battalion each received the Order of Alexander Nevsky while the 335th Sapper Battalion won the Order of the Red Star. Earlier, on May 17, the 584th Rifle Regiment had been awarded the Order of Kutuzov, 3rd Degree, for its part in taking Gdańsk. At this point the men and women of the division shared the full title of 199th Rifle, Smolensk, Order of the Red Banner, Orders of Suvorov and Kutuzov Division. (Russian: 199-я стрелковая Смоленская Краснознамённая орденов Суворова и Кутузова дивизия.)

According to STAVKA Order No. 11095 of May 29, 1945, part 6, the 199th is listed as one of the rifle divisions to be "disbanded in place". In fulfilment of this the division was disbanded near Zerlanghutte, Adamswalde, and Grosszerlang between June 7-18, transferring 609 officers and 5,144 other ranks under age 39 and equipment to the 52nd Guards Rifle Division. 1,247 horses, 161 vehicles, 2,249 rifles, 960 submachine guns, 82 light machine guns, 21 heavy machine guns, 17 anti-aircraft guns, 15 120mm mortars, 36 82mm mortars, 16 122mm howitzers, 24 76mm divisional guns, nine 76mm regimental guns, 11 anti-tank guns, and eight anti-tank rifles were handed over. Those of its other ranks older than 39, totaling 2,041, were sent to the 3rd Shock Army reserve for demobilization.
