= Matvey Kononenko =

Red Army general-mayor

Matvey Prokopyevich Kononenko
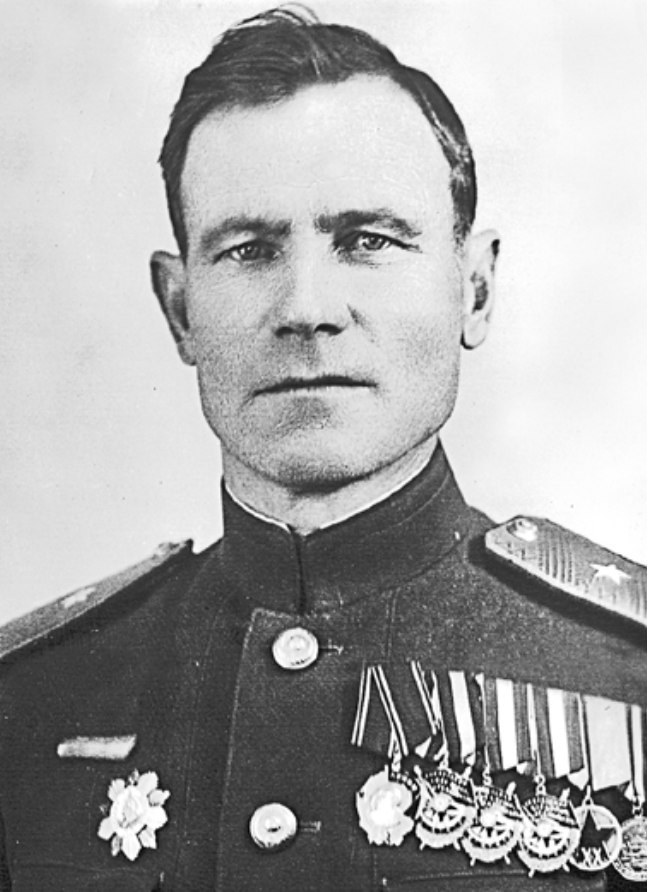
- Kononenko in the late 1940s
- Born: 27 November 1900; Rybalchye, Dneprovsky Uyezd, Taurida Governorate, Russian Empire
- Died: 26 October 1977 (aged 76) Pyatigorsk, Soviet Union
- Allegiance: Soviet Union
- Branch: Red Army
- Service years: 1918–1947
- Rank: General-mayor
- Commands: 36th Separate Cadet Rifle Brigade; 17th Rifle Division; 199th Rifle Division
- Conflicts: Russian Civil War; World War II
- Awards: Order of Lenin

Matvey Prokopyevich Kononenko (Russian: Матвей Прокопьевич Кононенко; 27 November 1900 – 26 October 1977) was a Red Army general-mayor who held brigade and division commands during World War II.

== Early life and Russian Civil War ==
A Ukrainian, Matvey Prokopyevich Kononenko was born on 27 November 1900 in the village of Rybalchye, Dneprovsky Uyezd, Taurida Governorate. During the Russian Civil War, he joined Vasily Didov's Red Guard detachment on 6 March 1918 and took part in fighting against German troops in Kherson Governorate. He transferred to the 5th Trans-Dnieper Rifle Regiment of the Red Army in April 1919 as a Red Army man and later served with the 2nd Shock Rifle Regiment, before becoming a squad leader in the 2nd Cavalry Regiment of Grigory Kotovsky's Brigade of the 45th Volyn Rifle Division in January 1920.

During his wartime service in the Red Army, Kononenko was shell-shocked in 1920, taking part in fighting against the Whites on the Southern Front and in the Polish–Soviet War on the Southwestern Front in spring and summer 1920. During the fall and winter of 1920–1921 he took part in the fighting against the Ukrainian People's Army and Ukrainian nationalists, before participating in the suppression of the Tambov Rebellion in spring and summer 1921. For distinguishing himself in battle, Kononenko was awarded the Order of the Red Banner in May 1922.

== Interwar period ==
After the end of the war, Kononenko received training at the divisional cavalry school of the 9th Crimean Cavalry Division between February and November 1922. On graduation from the divisional school, he served as an assistant platoon commander and platoon commander in the 18th Cavalry Regiment of the 4th Cavalry Division in Ukraine (the 3rd Bessarabian Cavalry Division from January 1923). After completing the Recurring Course for Mid-Level Command Personnel of the 2nd Cavalry Corps between December 1923 and April 1924, Kononenko returned to his previous position. The regiment was renumbered as the 15th Cavalry Regiment in September 1924, and in August 1925 Kononenko entered the Crimean Cavalry School at Simferopol for advanced training. He was transferred to the Budyonny Ukrainian Cavalry School at Pervomaysk in October 1926, and upon graduation in 1927 returned to the 3rd Cavalry Division, serving with its 13th Cavalry Regiment as a platoon commander, acting chief of the regimental school, squadron commander, and regimental chief of ration supply before returning to his previous position as chief of the regimental school.

Kononenko completed advanced training at the Frunze Military Academy between May 1935 and August 1938, before being appointed chief of the 1st (Operations) Section of the headquarters of the 16th Cavalry Division of the Kiev Special Military District. Appointed commander of the 17th Mountain Cavalry Division's 91st Mountain Cavalry Regiment of the Transcaucasus Military District on 2 September 1940, he was transferred to the Oryol Military District to command the 48th Tank Division's 48th Motor Rifle Regiment in March 1941.

== World War II ==
In September, Kononenko, then a lieutenant colonel, was sent to the Academy of the General Staff, and after completed a two-month course in November appointed commander of the 36th Separate Cadet Rifle Brigade of the Central Asian Military District. Kononenko's brigade was sent to the Western Front in December and as part of the 16th Army took part in battles on the Istra axis. For his performance in the fighting, 16th Army commander Konstantin Rokossovsky recommended Kononenko for the Order of the Red Banner on 21 January, which was awarded on 12 April. The recommendation read:

Lieutenant Colonel Kononenko is a tactically competent commander and has fine military education. The personnel of the brigade and Comrade Kononenko himself displayed courage and bravery in the struggle with the German hordes on the distant approaches to Moscow. Comrade Kononenko skillfully used his knowledge in the direction of the brigade's fighting. The brigade was prepared and under his leadership conducted a series of successful operations. Lieutenant Colonel Kononenko possesses a firm will, is personally courageous, and a dynamic, decisive commander. For bravery and fine conduct of the battles to destroy the German-Fascist bandits on the approaches to Moscow, he is deserving of the high state award of the Order of the Red Banner.

However, in April, for the brigade's "failure to accomplish objectives and significant losses," Kononenko was arrested and imprisoned by the NKVD. The Western Front Military Tribunal sentenced him to execution on 12 May, but the sentence was reduced to ten years of imprisonment postponed until the end of the war with dispatch to the front. Kononenko was accordingly demoted to the rank of lieutenant and placed in the reserve of the Western Front Military Council.

Kononenko was appointed deputy commander of the 774th Rifle Regiment of the 33rd Army's 222nd Rifle Division in August. In September he took command of the 113th Rifle Division's 1290th Rifle Regiment. By a 26 September decision of the Western Front Military Council, for distinguishing himself in battle, Kononenko was restored to his rank of lieutenant colonel and his sentence was removed. On 30 September he became acting commander of the 17th Rifle Division, and on 7 October was confirmed as division deputy commander. The unit took part in defensive battles north of Gzhatsk.

Wounded on the morning of 19 March 1943 while at the command post of the division's 1316th Rifle Regiment during a German attack, Kononenko was hospitalized until May, when he returned to his previous post as division deputy commander. The 17th Rifle Division was shifted to the 50th Army in May and took part in the Oryol Offensive, during which it liberated Zhizdra.

On 17 August, Kononenko took command of the 199th Rifle Division. He led it as part of the 68th Army in the Smolensk operation, the Yelnya-Dorogobuzh Offensive Operation, and the Smolensk-Roslavl offensive. He was treated for illness in a hospital between 24 August and 13 September, then returned to command the division. Kononenko's division received the Smolensk honorific on 25 September for its performance in the liberation of the city. Subsequently, the division, shifted to the 5th Army on 5 November, took part in constant fighting near Orsha. On 16 December the 199th conducted a march to the region of Vitebsk, where it was reassigned to the 33rd Army. Kononenko's division went on the offensive on 30 December, cutting the Vitebsk–Orsha highway, pushing back the German troops and consolidating on the line of Borovlyany and Lipovets. Between January and April 1944 the division took part in repeated attacks near Vitebsk. Kononenko was promoted to the rank of general-mayor on 22 February.

Kononenko's division was brought up to strength between 15 and 26 April, then relocated to the Mstislavl region and shifted to the 2nd Belorussian Front reserve. For his performance in the Mogilev offensive, 70th Rifle Corps commander Vasily Terentyev recommended Kononenko for the Order of the Red Banner on 3 July, which was awarded on the next day. The recommendation read:

On 26 June 1944, the division, under the command of Comrade Kononenko was first among the units of the corps to force a crossing of the Dnieper river north of the city of Mogilev.

Comrade Kononenko displayed persistence and bravery during this battle. Correctly organizing the covering and fire battle, without waiting for the preparation of crossings, he made a crossing to the right bank with two infantry battalions from the march using improvised means and began fighting to expand the bridgehead. Displaying daring, the fearless Comrade Kononenko conducted the battle to force a crossing directly from the combat formations, firmly maintaining control of the division in battle.

On 27 June 1944, Comrade Kononenko correctly organized and conducted the battle for Mogilev, as a result of which the division, in cooperation with other units, drove out the Germans from the city, inflicting heavy losses in personnel and equipment, capturing 180 prisoners of war.

In the battles during the pursuit of the enemy, the division advanced more than 500 kilometers, liberating hundreds of settlements and destroying a great quantity of enemy personnel and equipment.

Comrade Kononenko daringly and skillfully conducted three crossings of the major water obstacle of the Neman river. Selflessly and bravely leading the troops, he ensured the success of the battles with little loss to our troops.

For courage displayed in battles and skillful planning, as a result of which the major success of the division was ensured, Comrade Kononenko is deserving of the award of the Order of the Red Banner.

The 199th was assigned to the 49th Army on 5 July, taking part in the Mogilev offensive, the Belostok offensive, and the Osovets offensive during Operation Bagration. For forcing a crossing of the Pronya and Dnieper rivers, breaking through German fortified defenses and liberating Mogilev, the division was awarded the Order of Suvorov, 3rd class, on 10 July, and the Order of the Red Banner on 1 September for liberating Osovets Fortress. Subsequently, until the end of the year, the division defended positions on the eastern bank of the Narew.

On 14 January 1945 Kononenko's 199th went on the offensive in the East Prussian Offensive. It took part in the Mława–Elbing Offensive and the East Pomeranian Offensive. During the East Pomeranian Offensive, the division distinguished itself in the capture of Czersk and Danzig. From 19 April to 12 July Kononenko was treated at a hospital for illness, then placed at the disposal of the Main Cadre Directorate.

== Postwar ==
After the end of the war, Kononenko served as deputy commander of the 60th Rifle Corps in the Stavropol Military District. He was retired due to illness on 18 March 1947, and died in Pyatigorsk on 26 October 1977.

== Awards ==
Kononenko was a recipient of the following decorations:

- Order of Lenin (21 February 1945)
- Four Orders of the Red Banner (May 1922, 12 April 1942, 4 July 1944, 3 November 1944)
- Order of Kutuzov, 2nd class (28 September 1943)
