= Galya Morrell =

Arctic explorer & artist

- Born: 1961 (age 64–65)
- Known for: Arctic Exploration and Ice Sculpting

Galya Morrell (born 1961) is an Arctic explorer and ice artist who is a member of one of the Komi peoples. Her husband is American.
