= Georg Stumme =

German general

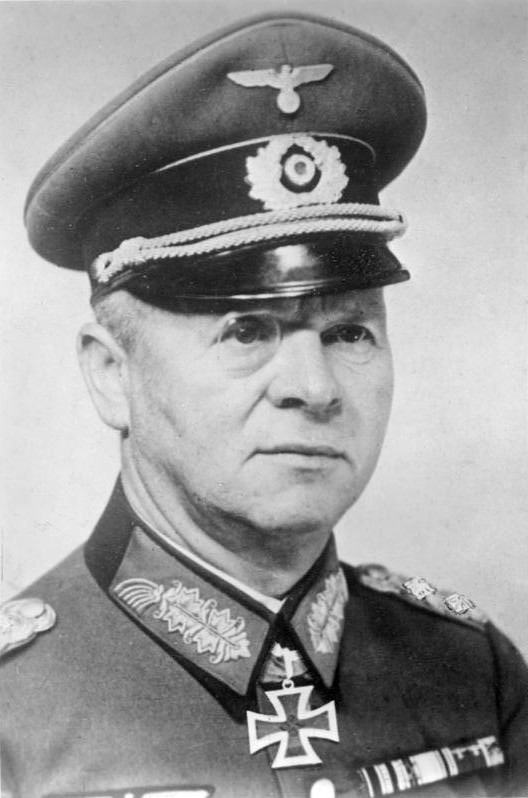
- Born: 29 July 1886; Halberstadt, Province of Saxony, Kingdom of Prussia, German Empire
- Died: 24 October 1942 (aged 56); Outpost Snipe, El Alamein, Kingdom of Egypt
- Military career
- Allegiance: German Empire; Weimar Republic; Nazi Germany
- Branch: Imperial German Army; Prussian Army; Freikorps; Reichswehr; German Army
- Service years: 1906–1942
- Rank: General der Panzertruppe
- Commands: 2nd Light Division; 7th Panzer Division; XXXX Army Corps; Panzer Army Africa
- Conflicts: World War I; World War II; Battle of France; Invasion of Yugoslavia; Operation Barbarossa; Battle of Greece; Case Blue; Second Battle of El Alamein; Defence of Outpost Snipe (KIA)
- Awards: Knight's Cross of the Iron Cross

Georg Stumme (29 July 1886 – 24 October 1942) was a general in the Wehrmacht of Nazi Germany during the Second World War who briefly commanded the Axis forces at the beginning of the Second Battle of El Alamein, and died during the Defence of Outpost Snipe. He had taken part in the Battle of France, the invasion of Yugoslavia and Operation Barbarossa, the invasion of the Soviet Union. On 19 July 1940, he received the Knight's Cross of the Iron Cross (the highest award in the military and paramilitary forces of Nazi Germany) after the Wehrmacht had won the Battle of France in June 1940.

== First World War ==
Stumme fought in the First World War and stayed with the Reichswehr after the war. After the Nazi regime came to power in January 1933 he was promoted to Oberst (Colonel) in 1933. After the German rearmament had begun, Stumme was promoted to Generalmajor (equivalent to a one-star or brigadier general in Allied armies) in 1936. Stumme became commander of 2nd Light Division, which was formed on 10 November 1938.

== Second World War ==
Stumme had achieved the rank of Generalleutnant by the beginning of WW 2, and he commanded 2nd Light Division in the Invasion of Poland in 1939. The unit was converted into 7th Panzer Division on 18 October 1939. He relinquished command to Erwin Rommel in 1940, and on 15 February 1940 was appointed as commander of XXXX Armeekorps (renamed XXXX Corps (motorized) in September 1940). He led this corps in the 1940 Battle of France, being promoted to General der Kavallerie on 1 June 1940. Shortly thereafter he was awarded the Knight's Cross of the Iron Cross for bravery.

Stumme and XXXX Corps participated in the invasion of Yugoslavia and Greece in April 1940. Stumme led the attack of the right flank of the 12th Army. His two divisions drove west separately into Yugoslavia and then wheeled south, meeting at Monastir on 9 April. He then participated in the invasion of Greece. He was promoted to General der Panzertruppe.

In Operation Barbarossa, Stumme served under Field Marshal Fedor von Bock. Stumme's corps captured Mozhaisk in October 1941. In 1942, in Fall Blau ("Case Blue"), Stumme led the advance of 6th Army with his renamed XXXX. Panzerkorps.

In June 1942, some German plans were captured by Soviet forces. Hitler blamed Stumme, and ordered him court-martialled. He was relieved of command on 21 July 1942, was found guilty and was sentenced to five years imprisonment, but Bock secured his release. Ulrich von Hassell called it a case of "the grotesque game of tin soldiers which Hitler plays with the generals" in his diary and commented: "Stumme, commanding general of a tank corps, was sentenced to five years' imprisonment because [of the actions of a divisional staff officer]. He was immediately pardoned [in reality, he was released several weeks later], with Göring promising him a new command and now being sent to Africa as a substitute for Rommel. An unmilitary, un-Prussian farce."

Stumme was sent to North Africa, where Rommel was to be relieved due to illness and exhaustion. Stumme arrived on 19 September to be briefed a few days before Rommel departed. He took overall command of Panzerarmee Afrika (combined German and Italian forces), confronting the British at El Alamein in Egypt, with Ritter von Thoma replacing the wounded Walther Nehring as commander of the Afrika Korps.

== Battle of El Alamein and death ==
Stumme "faithfully followed the plan left by Rommel" for responding to the expected attack. His letters to his superiors indicate he was not optimistic and agreed with Rommel that the only real prospect of success lay in keeping the enemy wrongfooted with attacks, for which he did not have the resources. Just over a month after his arrival the British began their attack on 23 October with a massive bombardment. Stumme prohibited the use of German artillery ammunition to bombard the British forward assembly areas, where the troops were vulnerable, preferring to keep his limited resources in reserve. Reinhard Stumpf called this "a grave mistake that enabled the British to form up for the attack in relative peace".

Unlike Rommel, Stumme travelled without the protection of an escort and radio car. On 24 October Stumme and Colonel Andreas Büchting, his chief signals officer, drove to the front to review the situation. On the way to the command post, the car came into the open and was attacked. Büchting was killed by a shot in the head. Stumme jumped out of the car and apparently was holding onto the side while the driver drove out of range. He was found dead along the track the next day, with no wound that could be seen. He was known to have high blood pressure and it was thought he had died of a heart attack. He was replaced as commander of Panzerarmee Afrika with the return of Rommel, while the Afrika Korps was commanded by General der Panzertruppe Wilhelm Ritter von Thoma.

== Assessments ==
Stumme has been described by historian Samuel W. Mitcham as a "competent but pleasure-loving general", who cultivated a convivial relationship with his officers, unlike the hard-driving Rommel. One of his officers, Friedrich von Stauffenberg, said that Stumme created a "congenial" atmosphere while maintaining a "crack, well-officered division". According to Mark M. Boatner,

The short, good-humored Stumme suffered from chronic high blood pressure that gave his face a permanent flush. The troops called him "Fireball", and the monocled little general, although old for front line duty even by Wehrmacht standards, had a flair for seizing tactical opportunities.

Rommel had suggested that Heinz Guderian should replace him in North Africa but Guderian was out of favor and his request was refused. Stumme was given the command instead and Rommel had confidence in him as a commander.

== Awards and decorations ==
- Iron Cross (1914), 2nd and 1st Class
- Saxe-Meiningen Cross for Merit in War (SMK) on 24 July 1915 (83rd award)
- Wound Badge (1918) in Black
- Baltic Cross
- Silesian Eagle, 2nd Grade
- Honour Cross of the World War 1914/1918 with Swords on 20 December 1934
- Wehrmacht Long Service Award, 4th to 1st Class for 25 years
  - 1st Class on 2 October 1936
- Hungarian World War Commemorative Medal with Swords
- Bulgarian Commemorative Medal for the War of 1915–1918 with Swords
- Sudetenland Medal
- Clasp to the Iron Cross (1939), 2nd and 1st Class
- Order of Military Merit (Bulgaria), Officer's Cross
- Winter Battle in the East 1941–42 Medal
- Knight's Cross of the Iron Cross on 19 July 1940 as General der Kavallerie and commanding general of the XXXX. Armeekorps

Military offices
Preceded by none	Commander of 2nd Light Division; 10 November 1938 – 18 October 1939	Succeeded by 7th Panzer Division
Preceded by 2nd Light Division	Commander of 7th Panzer Division; 18 October 1939 – 5 February 1940	Succeeded by Generalmajor Erwin Rommel
Preceded by none	Commander of XXXX. Armeekorps; 26 January 1940 – 9 July 1942	Succeeded by XXXX. Panzer Corps
Preceded by Generalfeldmarschall Erwin Rommel	Commander of Panzerarmee Afrika; 22 September 1942 – 24 October 1942	Succeeded by General der Panzertruppe Wilhelm Ritter von Thoma
