= Oswald Lutz =

German general

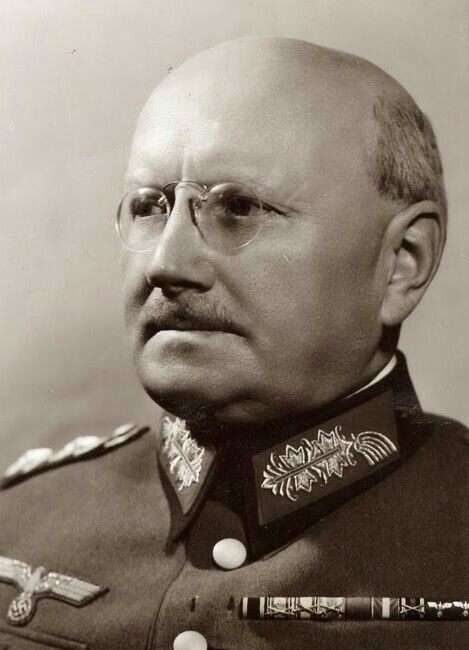
- Born: 6 November 1876; Öhringen, Oberamt Öhringen, Jagstkreis, Kingdom of Württemberg, German Empire
- Died: 26 February 1944 (aged 67); Munich, Gau Munich-Upper Bavaria, Nazi Germany
- Military career
- Allegiance: German Empire; Kingdom of Bavaria; Weimar Republic; Nazi Germany
- Branch: Imperial German Army; Reichswehr; German Army (Wehrmacht)
- Service years: 1894–1938; 1941–1942
- Rank: General der Panzertruppe
- Commands: Panzer Troops Command; Head of Mechanized Forces
- Conflicts: World War I; World War II

Oswald Lutz (6 November 1876 – 26 February 1944) was a German General who oversaw the motorization of the German Army in the late 1920s and early 1930s and was appointed as the commander of the Wehrmacht's Panzer Troops Command in 1935.

== Biography ==
Born in Öhringen, Lutz joined the Bavarian Army as an officer cadet in 1894 and was commissioned as a Leutnant in the 1st Bavarian Engineer Battalion in 1896. After service in the German Imperial Army in World War I, he was retained in the Reichswehr, in which he attained the rank of Oberstleutnant in 1923 and Oberst in 1928.

On 1 April 1931, Lutz was appointed the Inspector of Motor Transport Troops. Promoted to Generalmajor, Oberstleutnant Heinz Guderian was appointed his chief of staff and Major Walter Nehring later joined his staff. Both men would go on to be influential in the establishment of the Panzerwaffe. Lutz continued to oversee the motorization of the army and was promoted to Generalleutnant on 1 February 1933. Two and a half years later, he was promoted again to General der Panzertruppe and was made commander of the Panzer Troops Command. However, he lost Guderian as his chief of staff; he was given command of a panzer division. Guderian's replacement, Friedrich Paulus, was not effective and the momentum of the development of the Panzerwaffe slowed as Lutz was much less energetic.

Lutz was retired from active duty in February 1938 after falling from Adolf Hitler's favour. During World War II, he was recalled to service and appointed on 22 September 1941 to head a minor special staff unit before being retired again on 31 May 1942. He died in Munich in 1944 aged 67.

== Awards and decorations ==
- Iron Cross (1914) 1st and 2nd class
- Military Merit Order of Bavaria, 4th class with swords and crown
- Knight's Cross 1st class with swords of the Albert Order with swords
- Knight's Cross 1st class with swords of the Friedrich Order with swords
- Knight's Cross of the Württemberg Military Merit Order
- Hanseatic Cross of Hamburg
