= XXXXVIII Panzer Corps =

XXXXVIII (XLVIII). Panzerkorps
- Active: 15 December 1940 – 8 May 1945
- Country: Nazi Germany
- Branch: Army
- Type: Panzer corps
- Role: Armoured warfare
- Size: Corps
- Engagements: World War II

Commanders
- Notable commanders: Hermann Balck; Dietrich von Choltitz; Hans Cramer; Walter Nehring

XXXXVIII Panzer Corps (also: XXXXVIII Army Corps or XXXXVIII. Armeekorps) (Note: It was a motorized corps and as such was fully designated "XXXXVIII. Armeekorps (motorisierte)" or "XXXXVIII Corps (motorized)", and so on), was a corps-level formation of the German Army which saw extensive action on both the Eastern and Western Fronts during World War II.

== History ==
The corps was originally formed on 15 December 1940 in Germany. At the dawn of Operation Barbarossa, on 22 June 1941, the Corps was attached to Field Marshal Ewald von Kleist's Panzer Group 1, a part of Army Group South. The corps took part in the Battle of Brody early in the campaign, and later saw action at Berdichev and Kirovograd. As did all German Corps on the Eastern Front, the XLVIII Motorized Corps implemented the criminal Commissar Order.

From late 1941 to May 1942, the corps took part in defensive operations in the Kursk area. It was renamed the XLVIII Panzer Corps in early summer 1942. Thereafter the corps joined the Fall Blau offensive towards Stalingrad under Army Group B.

During the Battle of Stalingrad the 29th Motorized Infantry Division (transferred to the IV Army Corps), the 14th Panzer Division and the 24th Panzer Division (both transferred to the LI Army Corps) was trapped inside the Stalingrad pocket.

The remaining major units, 22nd Panzer Division and 1st Armoured Division (Romania), were almost destroyed during Operation Uranus. It was quickly reformed and used by Field Marshal Erich von Manstein's Operation Winter Storm efforts to relieve General Friedrich Paulus' trapped Sixth Army still in Stalingrad.

In February 1943, the XLVIII Panzer Corps took part in the battles around Kharkov, and in June it was committed to the southern flank of the Battle of Kursk as part of 4th Panzer Army (Hermann Hoth ). After the failure of Operation Citadel, the corps took part in the retreat from Ukraine. By February 1945, the corps found itself in Silesia, and it ended the war defending the Elbe River, where it surrendered in May 1945.

== Commanders ==
- General der Panzertruppe Werner Kempf (22 June 1941 – 28 Sep 1942)
- General der Panzertruppe Rudolf Veiel (28 Sep 1942 – 1 Nov 1942)
- Generalleutnant Ferdinand Heim (1 Nov 1942 – 19 Nov 1942)
- General der Panzertruppe Hans Cramer (19 Nov 1942 – 25 Nov 1942)
- General der Panzertruppe Heinrich Eberbach (26 Nov 1942 – 30 Nov 1942)
- General der Panzertruppe Otto von Knobelsdorff (30 Nov 1942 – 6 May 1943)
- General der Infanterie Dietrich von Choltitz (6 May 1943 – 30 Aug 1943)
- General der Panzertruppe Otto von Knobelsdorff (30 Aug 1943 – 30 Sep 1943)
- General der Infanterie Dietrich von Choltitz (30 Sep 1943 – 21 Oct 1943)
- General der Panzertruppe Heinrich Eberbach (22 Oct 1943 – 14 Nov 1943)
- General der Panzertruppe Hermann Balck (15 Nov 1943 – 4 Aug 1944)
- General der Panzertruppe Walther Nehring (4 Aug 1944 – 19 Aug 1944)
- General der Panzertruppe Fritz-Hubert Gräser (19 Aug 1944 – 20 Sep 1944)
- General der Panzertruppe Maximilian Reichsfreiherr von Edelsheim (20 Sep 1944 – 31 Mar 1945)
- Generalleutnant Wolf Hagemann (31 Mar 1945 – 8 May 1945)

== General Staff Officers ==
- Oberstleutnant Friedrich von Mellenthin, Chief of General Staff (Jan 1943 to Aug 1944)
- Major Eitel-Friedrich Binder, Operations Officer(1a) (Feb 1943 to Aug 1943)

== Subordinate units ==
XXXXVIII Motorized Corps

- As of June 1941 (Operation Barbarossa)
  - 11th Panzer Division
  - 16th Panzer Division
  - 16th Infantry Division (mot.)
  - 612th Artillery Command
  - 619th Artillery Command
  - Corps staff and support units

XXXXVIII Panzer Corps

- As of August 1942 (Fall Blau)
  - 14th Panzer Division
  - 24th Panzer Division
  - 29th Infantry Division (Wehrmacht)
  - 108th Artillery Command
  - Corps staff and support units

XXXXVIII Panzer Corps

- As of November 1942
  - 22nd Panzer Division
  - 1st Armoured Division (Romania)

XXXXVIII Panzer Corps

- As of December 1942 (reformed after loss in the Battle of Stalingrad)
  - 11th Panzer Division
  - 336th Infantry Division
  - Staff of the 384th Infantry Division, with "Alarm" troops
  - 7th Luftwaffe Field Division
  - 108th Artillery Command
  - Corps staff and support units
- As of July 1943 (Operation Citadel)
  - 3rd Panzer Division
  - 11th Panzer Division
  - Panzergrenadier Division Großdeutschland
  - 167th Infantry Division
  - 132nd Artillery Command
  - 144th Artillery Command
  - Corps staff and support units
- As of December 1943
  - 1st SS Panzer Division LSSAH
  - Battle group of the 2nd SS Panzer Division Das Reich
  - 1st Panzer Division
  - 8th Panzer Division
  - 19th Panzer Division
  - 108th Artillery Command
  - Corps staff and support units
