= Wilhelm Ritter von Thoma =

German army officer

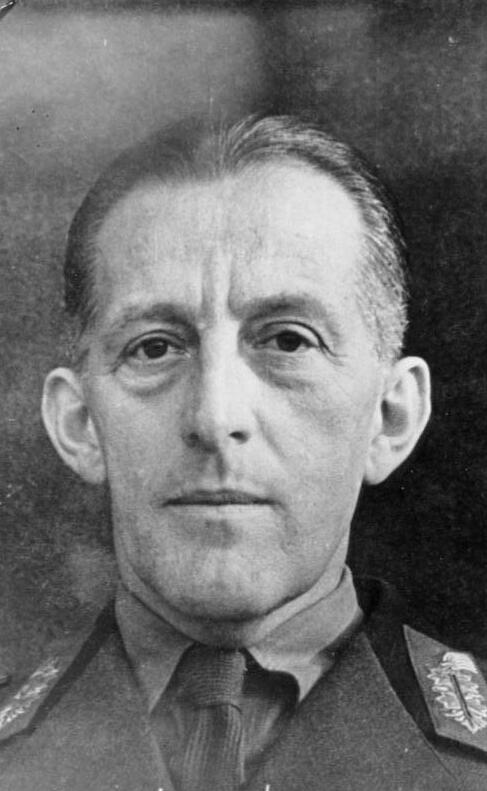
- Born: 11 September 1891; Dachau, Kingdom of Bavaria, German Empire
- Died: 30 April 1948 (aged 56); Dachau, Bavaria, Allied-occupied Germany
- Military career
- Allegiance: German Empire; Weimar Republic; Nazi Germany
- Branch: Condor Legion; German Army
- Service years: 1912–1942
- Rank: General der Panzertruppe
- Unit: 20th Panzer Division
- Conflicts: World War I Spanish Civil War; World War II
- Awards: Knight's Cross of the Military Order of Max Joseph; Spanish Cross In Gold with Swords and Diamonds; Knight's Cross of the Iron Cross

Wilhelm Josef Ritter von Thoma (11 September 1891 – 30 April 1948) was a German general who served in World War I, in the Spanish Civil War, and as a general in World War II. He was a recipient of the Knight's Cross of the Iron Cross.

Thoma is known for his indiscretion while a POW in British captivity, when he unwittingly revealed the existence of the V-1 flying bomb and the V-2 weapons programmes. He was subject to surveillance by British intelligence and while speaking to another German officer, was recorded discussing rockets that were being tested at Kummersdorf West, which he had observed while on a visit that also included Generalfeldmarschall Walther von Brauchitsch, the Commander-in-Chief of the Army. British reconnaissance flights over Peenemünde Army Research Center in May and June 1943 brought back unmistakable images of rockets at the facility; the subsequent bombing of the site severely disrupted the programme.

== Military career ==
Wilhelm Ritter von Thoma was born in Dachau in 1891. He was the son of a Bavarian tax official and became a career officer with the Bavarian Army. Thoma fought in the first World War with 3rd Bavarian Infantry Regiment (part of 2nd, then, from 1915, 11th Bavarian Infantry Division) on the Western (1914/15/16/17/18) and Eastern Front (1915/16), the Serbian Campaign (1915) and the Romanian Front in 1916/17. During the Second Battle of the Marne in July 1918 he was captured by French-American forces and became a prisoner of war until September 1919. He was decorated with the Knight's Cross of the Bavarian Military Max Joseph Order, the highest military decoration for bravery in the Bavarian Army, and was awarded the noble title of Ritter.

After the war, Thoma remained in the new German army, the Reichswehr. During the Spanish Civil War, and now a colonel, he commanded the ground element of the Condor Legion, following the German intervention on the side of the Nationalists under Francisco Franco. He became an advisor on tank warfare to Field Marshal Walther von Brauchitsch. In the second World War he commanded tanks in the field during the Battle of France and was intended to hold a senior role in Operation Sealion, the planned invasion of Britain.

During Operation Barbarossa, the invasion of the Soviet Union in 1941, Thoma led the 17th Panzer Division. He then commanded the 20th Panzer Division in the Battle of Moscow and after. In December 1941, Thoma received the Knight's Cross of the Iron Cross.

In September 1942, he was transferred to North Africa to take over command of the Afrika Korps, replacing Walther Nehring who had been wounded. When Panzer Army Africa commander Georg Stumme died on 24 October during the Second Battle of El Alamein, Thoma took command until Rommel returned on 26 October. On 4 November, Thoma was captured at Tel-el-Mapsra as the Allies pursued the retreating Axis forces.

"I saw it once with Feldmarschall Brauchitsch, there is a special ground near Kunersdorf [sic] ... they've got these huge things which they've brought up here. ... They've always said they would go 15 km into the stratosphere and then. ... You only aim at an area. ... If one was to ... every few days ... frightful. ... The major there was full of hope--he said 'Wait until next year and the fun will start!"

— translation of Thoma speaking to Ludwig Crüwell while prisoners of war, 22 March 1943. (Note: By the middle of 1937, the Peenemünde rocket facility was nearly complete.) (Note: In the summer of 1936, Wernher von Braun and Walter Riedel had started to think of a much larger rocket than the A1 & A2 models,)

== Under British surveillance as POW ==
After his capture, Thoma was taken directly to Trent Park, known as the "Cockfosters Cage", a Combined Services Detailed Interrogation Centre prisoner of war facility for senior officers operated by MI19 and equipped with an "M Room" listening facility to secretly record and translate the conversations of the inmates.

Trent Park held high-ranking enemy officers prisoner in comfortable, but secretly monitored, conditions. While there Thoma was recorded speaking to another POW, General Ludwig Crüwell, discussing rockets that were being tested at Kummersdorf West, which he had observed while on a visit that also included Field Marshal Walther von Brauchitsch, the Commander-in-Chief of the Army, and other technical programme details.

Following his indiscretion, further British reconnaissance flights over Peenemünde in May and June 1943 brought back unmistakable images of rockets at the facility which was developing guided missiles and long-range ballistic missiles better known as the V-1 flying bomb and the V-2 ballistic missile. When reconnaissance and intelligence information regarding the V-2 became convincing, Churchill's War Cabinet directed the first planned raid (Operation Hydra), the attack on Peenemünde in August 1943, as part of Operation Crossbow, the Anglo-American campaign against the Vergeltungswaffe, the German long-range weapons programme.

Trent Park also eavesdropped when he stated that "every bomb, every piece of material and every human life that is still wasted in this senseless war, (is) too bad (German: zu schade). The only gain that war brings us, is that ... the ten-year gangster government comes to an end." Later he continued: "It would be a shame if one of them got shot. They should be put to forced labor until they peg out (German: bis sie verrecken)."

The British intelligence files describe von Thoma as; "very intelligent and exceedingly well-read... a striking personality and is violently anti-Nazi". He led the anti-Nazi faction at Trent Park and was appointed "camp leader" by the British following the departure of Crüwell to a camp in Canada in the summer of 1944.

In late 1945, Waffen-SS commander Kurt Meyer, captured in Belgium in September 1944 while commanding the 12th SS-Panzer Division "Hitlerjugend", arrived at Trent Park and noted that Thoma, the German camp leader, was "...highly thought of by the English. Relations between him and the guards [are] excellent".

== Post war ==
In 1946 Thoma's leg was amputated while he was still in British captivity. He was repatriated later that year. Thoma lived in his hometown of Dachau until his death of a heart attack in 1948.

== Reception ==
British military historian B.H. Liddell Hart, who interviewed him after the war, said that Thoma was "the most famous of the original German tank leaders next to Guderian":

A tough but likeable type, he is obviously a born enthusiast who lives in a world of tanks, loves fighting for the zest of it, but would fight without ill-feeling, respecting any worthy opponent. In the Middle Ages he would have been perfectly happy as a knight-errant, challenging all comers at any cross-road for the honour of crossing spears with them. The advent of the tank in warfare was a godsend to such a man, giving him a chance to re-live the part of the mail-clad knight.

Churchill's high regard for Thoma is evident from his many later quotations of Thoma's opinions on strategic matters, especially in his book about the war. After Montgomery invited Thoma to dine with him in his private trailer, Churchill remarked: "I sympathize with General von Thoma: Defeated, in captivity and... (long pause for dramatic effect) dinner with Montgomery".

== Awards ==
(First World War)

- Iron Cross, 2nd Class, 17 October 1914
- Iron Cross, 1st Class, 3 June 1915
- Military Order of Max Joseph, Knight's Cross, 5 July 1916
- Military Merit Order, 4th Class with Swords, 16 November 1914
- Austrian Military Merit Cross, 3rd Class with War Decoration, 5 April 1916
- Wound Badge 1918 version in Silver, 22 November 1916
- Honour Cross of the World War 1914/1918, early 1935

(Spanish Civil War)

- German Spanish Cross in Gold with Swords and Diamonds
- Spanish Military Medal with Diamonds
- Spanish Campaign Medal
- Condor Legion Tank Badge, in Gold. Unique version of the standard silver badge, presented by the men of his command at the Nationalist Victory Day Parade in Madrid on 19 May 1939.

(Second World War)

- Wehrmacht Long Service Award, 4th–1st class
- Clasp to the Iron Cross, 1st class
- Clasp to the Iron Cross, 2nd class
- Eastern Front Medal, mid 1942
- Knight's Cross of the Iron Cross on 31 December 1941 as Generalmajor and commander of the 20th Panzer Division

== Notes ==
Military offices
| Preceded by Generalmajor Karl Ritter von Weber | Commander of 17th Panzer Division; 17 July 1941 – 15 September 1941 | Succeeded by Generalleutnant Hans-Jürgen von Arnim |
| Preceded by Generalleutnant Georg von Bismarck | Commander of 20th Panzer Division; 14 October 1941 – 30 June 1942 | Succeeded by Generalleutnant Walter Düvert |
