= Ferdinand Heim =

German general

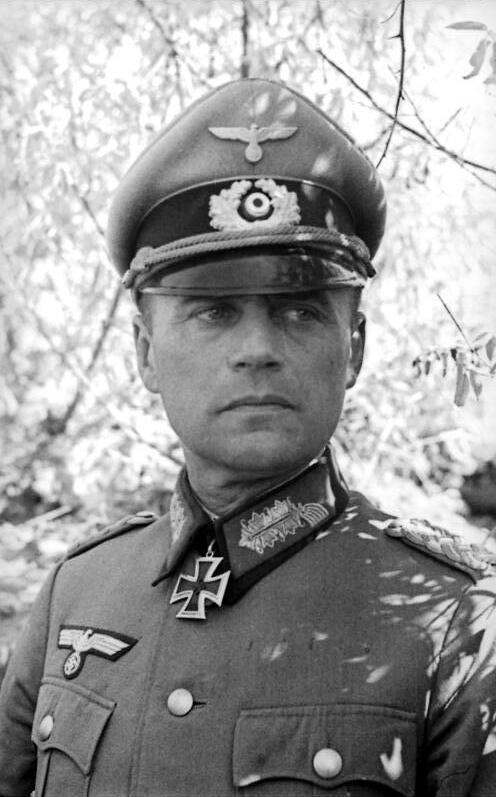
- Born: 27 February 1895; Reutlingen, Württemberg, German Empire
- Died: 14 November 1971 (aged 76); Ulm, West Germany
- Military career
- Allegiance: German Empire; Weimar Republic; Nazi Germany
- Branch: German Army
- Service years: 1914–1943; 1944–1945
- Rank: Generalleutnant
- Commands: 14th Panzer Division; XXXXVIII Panzer Corps; Boulogne fortress garrison
- Conflicts: World War I; World War II; Battle of Stalingrad; Fortress Boulougne
- Awards: Knight's Cross of the Iron Cross

Ferdinand Heim (27 February 1895 – 14 November 1971) was a World War II German general.

== Early life and World War I service ==
Ferdinand Karl Theodor Heim was born in Reutlingen in the Kingdom of Württemberg as the son of Ferdinand Heim, a lawyer, and Fanny, née Jäckh. After graduating from the Eberhard-Ludwigs-Gymnasium in Stuttgart, Heim entered the Württemberg Army on 24 June 1914 as an officer candidate (Fahnenjunker) in Field Artillery Regiment No. 13 (Feldartillerie-Regiment König Karl (1. Württembergisches) Nr. 13). When World War I began shortly thereafter, Heim went into the field with his regiment and was commissioned a lieutenant (Leutnant) on 25 February 1915 (with a Patent of 23 June 1913). In 1916, he was transferred to Reserve-Feldartillerie-Regiment Nr. 27 where he served as a battalion and regimental adjutant. He was promoted to Oberleutnant on 18 October 1918.

== Interwar Years ==
After service in a Freikorps formation after the war, Heim was taken over in the Reichswehr. He was married on 25 August 1923 to Hedwig, née Wunderlich, and the couple had two sons. Heim served in the Reichswehr's 5. Artillerie-Regiment and in the staff of the Reichswehr Ministry and was promoted to Hauptmann in March 1928 and Major in August 1934. In September 1934, he was transferred to the staff of the War Academy (Kriegsakademie) and in March 1937, he was promoted to Oberstleutnant and transferred to the General Staff of the German Army. In November 1938, he was transferred to the General Staff of the XVI Army Corps and on 26 June 1939 was named Chief of the General Staff of that corps with effect from 1 August 1939. Heim was promoted to Oberst in August 1939, just before the start of the Second World War.

== World War II service ==
Oberst Heim was Chief of the General Staff of the XVI Army Corps in the early stages of World War II and was name a section chief in the General Staff of the German Army on 15 February 1940. On 3 September 1940 Heim was appointed chief of staff to Field Marshal Walther von Reichenau, commander of the Sixth Army, while the Sixth Army was concentrated on the Cotentin Peninsula awaiting the Invasion of Britain. He was subsequently prominent in the planning of the German invasion of the Soviet Union (Operation Barbarossa).

On 1 July 1942, he was commander of the 14th Panzer Division taking part in the Second Battle of Kharkov and at the battle of Rostov. On 1 November 1942 he was given command of XXXXVIII Panzer Corps which was then part of the German 6th Army, at the Battle of Stalingrad.

Heim's XXXXVIII Panzer Corps was placed behind the Romanian 3rd Army at the beginning of the Soviet Operation Uranus "to check the enemy attack" along Paulus's left flank. Heim's XXXXVIII Panzer Corps, consisting of "two badly weakened divisions", was surrounded. He was ordered to take up a position of all-round defence but chose to ignore the order and ordered a break-out to the west, thereby saving his troops from anihilation. Heim was relieved of his command. "Hitler made him a scapegoat and relieved him of his position...despite the obvious lack of fighting experience, equipment and strength in Heim's Rumanian and German divisions."

After this, in January 1943, Heim was, at Hitler's order, dismissed from the Army, arrested and placed in solitary confinement at Moabit, finally being released in April 1943, when he was transferred to a military hospital at Ulm.

In a post-war interview, Heim asserted that the only documentation for his arrest was Hitler's order – no indictment, sentence or explanation. He learned, unofficially, that Hitler had been unwilling to cast blame on the Romanians for the poor quality of their troops so a German scapegoat was needed. German army and army group commanders were too valuable, so the "... only person left was the corps commander, and that was me."

Heim was informed in May 1943 that his dismissal from the German army had been revoked, and that he had been classified as retired. In August 1944, Heim returned to command German forces at the "fortress" of Boulogne, a "defend to the last" assignment. He was instructed to prepare significant defences but he arrived to find that nothing had been prepared and there were no suitable specialists to do the work. The ill-prepared and ill-suited garrison endured heavy bombardment and full-scale assaults when the 3rd Canadian Infantry Division launched Operation Wellhit. Heim surrendered to the Canadians on 23 September 1944.

== Post-war ==
Heim was sent to a series of POW camps (including Island Farm) in Britain and subsequently repatriated to Germany on 12 May 1948. He died at Ulm on 14 November 1971.

== Awards ==
- Kingdom of Prussia: Iron Cross (1914) 2nd Class (18 November 1914) & 1st Class (31 December 1917)
- Grand Duchy of Hesse: General Honour Decoration for Bravery (15 December 1915)
- Kingdom of Württemberg Golden Military Merit Medal (2 January 1916)
- Germany: Honour Cross of the World War 1914/1918 (29 December 1934)
- Germany: Sudetenland Medal with "Prague Castle" Clasp (18 August 1939)
- Germany: Clasp to the Iron Cross (1939) 2nd Class (21 September 1939) & 1st Class (2 October 1939)
- Germany: Knight's Cross of the Iron Cross on 30 August 1942 as Generalmajor and commander of the 14. Panzer-Division
- Kingdom of Italy: Order of the Crown of Italy, Commander's Cross (27 August 1940)

== Quote ==
"We must uphold the principle of only having carried out orders [...] We must stick to that principle if we are to create a more or less effective defence" - spoken in secret while prisoner to his fellow inmates regarding German atrocities in World War II

Military offices
Preceded by General der Panzertruppe Rudolf Veiel	Commander of XLVIII Panzer Corps; 1 November 1942 – 19 November 1942	Succeeded by General der Panzertruppe Hans Cramer
