= Panzer Army Africa =

German-Italian field army in North Africa during WWII

Panzer Army Africa Army Group Africa
- German: Panzerarmee Afrika; Italian: Gruppo Corazzato Africa; German: Heeresgruppe Afrika; Italian: Gruppo d'Armate Africa
- Active: 15 August 1941 – 13 May 1943
- Country: Germany; Italy
- Branch: Heer ( Wehrmacht); Royal Italian Army
- Type: Infantry; Panzer
- Size: Field army
- Part of: Comando Supremo; Oberbefehlshaber Süd
- Engagements: North African campaign; Western Desert campaign; Tunisian campaign

Commanders
- Notable commanders: Erwin Rommel; Georg Stumme; Giovanni Messe; Hans-Jürgen von Arnim

The Panzer Army Africa (German: Panzerarmee Afrika; Italian: Gruppo Corazzato Africa) was a joint German-Italian field army that fought in the North African campaign during World War II. It consisted of one German corps and three Italian corps. In 1943, during the Tunisian campaign, the Panzerarmee Afrika became the Italian 1st Army, subject to the newly-formed Army Group Africa. During the campaigns in North Africa, the Panzerarmee Afrika was subordinate to the Italian command and to German command headquarters in the Mediterranean.

== History ==
=== Panzer Group Africa ===
When the Afrikakorps was formed on 11 January 1941 it was subordinated to the Italian chain of command in Africa. In the middle of 1941 the Oberkommando der Wehrmacht (OKW, Armed Forces High Command) created a larger command structure in Africa, forming a new headquarters, Panzer Group Africa (Panzergruppe Afrika, Gruppo Corazzato Africa). On 15 August 1941, Panzer Group Africa was activated with newly promoted General der Panzertruppe Erwin Rommel in command. The Panzer Group controlled the Afrikakorps and other units that were sent to North Africa.

=== Panzer Army Africa ===
Panzer Group Africa was renamed Panzer Army Africa (Panzerarmee Afrika, Armata Corazzata Africa) on 30 January 1942. (A German Panzer group was an army-level headquarters. As the war progressed all of the Panzer groups were renamed Panzer Armies.)

=== German-Italian Panzer Army ===
Panzer Army Africa was renamed German-Italian Panzer Army (Deutsch-Italienische Panzerarmee, Armata Corazzata Italo-Tedesca) and subordinated to the Comando Supremo and to the Oberbefehlshaber Süd in October 1942 during the long retreat after the defeat at the Second Battle of El Alamein during the Western Desert Campaign.

=== Army Group Africa ===
February 1943 saw the formation of an Army Group Africa (Heeresgruppe Afrika, Gruppo d'Armate Africa), under Rommel, to manage the defence of Tunisia during the final stages of the North African Campaign. Army Group Africa included the German Fifth Panzer Army (5. Panzerarmee) under General Hans-Jürgen von Arnim and the German-Italian Panzer Army, re-named the Italian 1st Army and under the command of General Giovanni Messe. Command of the Army Group was turned over from Rommel to General von Arnim in March. Both General von Arnim and Messe surrendered on May 1943, and the Army Group Africa was disbanded. Thus, ending the Axis presence in Africa.

== Order of battle ==
=== Panzer Group Africa ===
- During the Western Desert Campaign (in 1941):
  - Deutsches Afrika Korps
  - Italian XX Army Corps
  - Italian XXI Army Corps

=== Panzer Army Africa ===
- During the Western Desert Campaign (in 1942):
  - Deutsches Afrika Korps
  - Italian XX Army Corps
  - Italian XXI Army Corps
  - Italian X Army Corps

=== Army Group Africa ===
- During the Tunisian Campaign (in 1943):
  - German Fifth Army
  - Italian First Army

== Commanders ==
No.	Portrait	Commander	Took office	Left office	Time in office
1	Erwin Rommel	Generaloberst; Erwin Rommel (1891–1944)	1 September 1941	9 March 1942	189 days
2	Ludwig Crüwell	General der Panzertruppe; Ludwig Crüwell (1892–1958)	9 March 1942	19 March 1942	10 days
3	Erwin Rommel	Generalfeldmarschall; Erwin Rommel (1891–1944)	19 March 1942	22 September 1942	187 days
4	Georg Stumme	General der Panzertruppe; Georg Stumme (1886–1942)	22 September 1942	24 October 1942 †	32 days
5	Wilhelm Ritter von Thoma	Generalleutnant; Wilhelm Ritter von Thoma (1891–1948); Acting	24 October 1942	25 October 1942	1 day
6	Erwin Rommel	Generalfeldmarschall; Erwin Rommel (1891–1944)	25 October 1942	26 November 1942	32 days
7	Gustav Fehn	General der Panzertruppe; Gustav Fehn (1892–1945)	26 November 1942	2 December 1942	6 days
8	Erwin Rommel	Generalfeldmarschall; Erwin Rommel (1891–1944)	2 December 1942	22 February 1943	82 days
9	Giovanni Messe	Maresciallo d'Italia; Giovanni Messe (Note: The German-Italian Panzerarmee Afrika was renamed Italian First Army by General Messe and was deployed in the Southern front in Tunisia and fought until May 1943.) (1883–1968)	22 February 1943	13 May 1943	80 days
10	Hans-Jürgen von Arnim	Generaloberst; Hans-Jürgen von Arnim (1889–1962)	10 March 1943	13 May 1943	64 days

== See also ==
- List of World War II military units of Germany
- List of Italian divisions in World War II
- Panzer Division
- Fliegerführer Afrika
- Hans von Luck
