= LXXXX Army Corps =

- LXXXX. Armeekorps
- Active: 17 November – 8 December 1942; 19 November 1944 – 8 May 1945
- Country: Nazi Germany
- Branch: Heer (Wehrmacht)
- Size: Corps
- Engagements: Tunisian Campaign; Operation Nordwind

Commanders
- Notable commanders: Walther Nehring; Erich Petersen

LXXXX Army Corps (LXXXX. Armeekorps) was a corps in the German Army during World War II, which was established twice.

== History ==
The first command of the LXXXX. Armeekorps was established on 17 November 1942 in Rome, Italy from Stab Nehring to establish and control the bridgeheads of Tunis and Bizerte in Tunisia. Two weeks later it was restructured into the 5th Panzer Army on 8 December 1942.

The LXXXX Army Corps Command was re-established on 19 November 1944 in the Alsace. The Corps staff came from the IV Luftwaffe Field Corps. The Corps participated in Operation Nordwind as part of the 1st Army. The Corps advanced some 15 km in the direction of Bitche but was then pushed back. The Corps remained in Northern Alsace until it was forced over the Rhine by the 7th US Army on 24 March 1945. The US 7th Army estimated that the two German armies involved lost 75 to 80% of their infantry strength in this short campaign. On April 3, the Corps was just east of Karlsruhe. At the end of April 1945, the Corps was in the Ore Mountains, as part of the 4th Panzer Army.

== Commanders ==
- General der Panzertruppe Walther Nehring (17 November 1942 - 8 December 1942)
- General der Flieger Erich Petersen (19 November 1944 - 8 May 1945)

== See also ==
- List of German corps in World War II
