= Erich Petersen =

Erich Karl Alexander Petersen
- Born: 25 August 1889; Heidelberg, Grand Duchy of Baden, German Empire
- Died: 4 July 1963 (aged 73); Allmannshausen, Starnberger See, Bavaria, West Germany
- Military career
- Allegiance: German Empire (to 1918); Weimar Republic (to 1933); Nazi Germany
- Branch: Prussian Army; German Imperial Army; Reichswehr; German Army (Wehrmacht); Luftwaffe
- Service years: 1909–45
- Rank: General der Flieger
- Commands: 7th Air Division; IV. Luftwaffe-Field-Corps; LXXXX Army-Corps
- Conflicts: World War I World War II
- Awards: German Cross in Gold

Erich Karl Alexander Petersen (25 August 1889 – 4 July 1963) was a German officer and general during the Second World War.

== Life ==
Petersen was a military cadet and later an infantry officer. He served in WWI and then with the Reichswehr. At the beginning of WWII, he was a colonel and commander of the Grenz-Infanterie-Regiment 125 at the Westwall. He participated in the Battle of France and the Balkans campaign (World War II). On 11 October 1941 with effect from 1 October 1941, he was transferred to the Luftwaffe.

Petersen served as commander of the 7th Air Division, until being tapped for promotion to commanding general of the IV Luftwaffe Field Corps. He also served as commanding general of the LXXXX Army Corps. Following the war, he was tried and acquitted of war crimes in France. He was released on 18 January 1950.

== Awards and decorations (excerpt) ==
- Iron Cross (1914), 2nd and 1st Class
- Hanseatic Cross of Hamburg
- Wound Badge (1918) in Black
- Honour Cross of the World War 1914/1918 with Swords
- Wehrmacht Long Service Award 4th to 1st Class
- Clasp to the Iron Cross (1939), 2nd and 1st Class
- German Cross in Gold on 27 March 1942 as Generalmajor and commander of the 7. Flieger-Division
- Mentioned in the Wehrmachtbericht (17 September 1944)

Military offices
Preceded by Generalmajor Alfred Sturm	Commander of 7. Flieger-Division; 1 June 1941 – 1 August 1942	Succeeded by Generalleutnant Richard Heidrich
Preceded by General der Flakartillerie Gerhard Hoffmann	Commander of IV Luftwaffe Corps / LXXXX Corps; 1 August 1943 – 7 May 1945 (end of war)	Succeeded by None
