= General der Panzertruppe =

WW2-era German Army branch general rank

General of the Armoured Corps General der Panzertruppe
- Arabesque and flecktarn suit insignia

- Army shoulder board
- Country: Nazi Germany
- Service branch: German Army
- Rank: Three-star
- Formation: 1935
- Abolished: 1945
- Next higher rank: Generaloberst
- Next lower rank: Generalleutnant
- Equivalent ranks: See Rank and rank insignia

General der Panzertruppe (lit. 'General of the Armoured Corps') was a General of the branch rank of the German Army, introduced in 1935. A General der Panzertruppe was a lieutenant general, above major general (Generalleutnant), commanding a Panzer corps.

== Rank and rank insignia ==
The rank was equivalent to the long established General der Kavallerie, General der Artillerie and General der Infanterie. The Wehrmacht also introduced General der Gebirgstruppe (mountain troops), General der Pioniere (engineers), General der Fallschirmtruppe (parachute troops), General der Flieger (aviators), General der Nachrichtentruppe (communications troops) and General der Luftnachrichtentruppe (air communications troops).

== Position ==
In the present-day German Army, there is a General der Panzertruppen, which is not a rank but a position, who is usually a brigadier general (Brigadegeneral). The General der Panzertruppen commands the Armoured Corps Training Centre. In the Nazi-era Army, the equivalent position was called Generalinspekteur der Panzertruppe.

== List ==
The following officers were General der Panzertruppe:

- Hans-Jürgen von Arnim (1889–1962) (promoted Generaloberst 4/12/1942)
- Hermann Balck (1893–1982)
- Erich Brandenberger (1882–1955)
- Hermann Breith (1892–1964)
- Hans Cramer (1896–1968)
- Ludwig Crüwell (1892–1958)
- Karl Decker (1897–1945) (committed suicide)
- Heinrich Eberbach (1895–1992)
- Maximilian Reichsfreiherr von Edelsheim (1897–1994)
- Hans-Karl Freiherr von Esebeck (1892–1955)
- Gustav Fehn (1892–1945) (executed by partisans)
- Ernst Feßmann (1881–1962)
- Wolfgang Fischer (1888–1943)
- Walter Fries (1894–1982)
- Hans Freiherr von Funck (1891–1979)
- Leo Geyr von Schweppenburg (1886–1974)
- Fritz-Hubert Graeser (1888–1960)
- Heinz Wilhelm Guderian (1888–1954) (promoted Generaloberst 1941)
- Josef Harpe (1887–1968) (promoted Generaloberst 20/5/1944)
- Sigfrid Henrici (1889–1964)
- Traugott Herr (1890–1976)
- Alfred Ritter von Hubicki (1887–1971)
- Hans-Valentin Hube (1890–1944) (promoted Generaloberst 20/4/1944, killed in plane crash 21/4/1944)
- Georg Jauer (1896–1971)
- Werner Kempf (1886–1964)
- Mortimer von Kessel (1893–1981)
- Friedrich Kirchner (1885–1960)
- Ulrich Kleemann (1892–1963)
- Otto von Knobelsdorff (1886–1966)
- Walter Krüger (1892–1973)
- Friedrich Kühn (1889–1944) (killed in bombing raid)
- Adolf-Friedrich Kuntzen (1889–1964)
- Willibald Freiherr von Langermann und Erlencamp (1890–1942)
- Joachim Lemelsen (1888–1954)
- Heinrich Freiherr von Lüttwitz (1896–1969)
- Smilo Freiherr von Lüttwitz (1895–1975)
- Oswald Lutz (1876–1944)
- Hasso von Manteuffel (1897–1978)
- Karl Mauss (1898–1959)
- Walter Model (1891–1945) (promoted Generaloberst 28/2/1942, Generalfeldmarschall 1/3/1944)
- Walther Nehring (1892–1983)
- Friedrich Paulus (1890–1957) (promoted Generaloberst 30/11/1942, Generalfeldmarschall 30/1/1943)
- Georg-Hans Reinhardt (1887–1963) (promoted Generaloberst 1/1/1942)
- Erwin Rommel (1891–1944) (promoted Generaloberst 24/1/1942, Generalfeldmarschall 2/6/1942, committed suicide 14/10/1944)
- Hans Röttiger (1896–1960)
- Dietrich von Saucken (1892–1980)
- Ferdinand Schaal (1889–1962)
- Rudolf Schmidt (1886–1957) (promoted Generaloberst 1/1/1942)
- Gerhard von Schwerin (1899–1980)
- Frido von Senger und Etterlin (1891–1963)
- Georg Stumme (1886–1942)
- Horst Stumpff (1887–1958)
- Wilhelm Ritter von Thoma (1891–1948)
- Gustav von Vaerst (1894–1975)
- Rudolf Veiel (1883–1956)
- Heinrich von Vietinghoff (1887–1952) (promoted Generaloberst 1/9/1943)
- Nikolaus von Vormann (1895–1959)
- Walther Wenck (1900–1982)

== Gallery ==
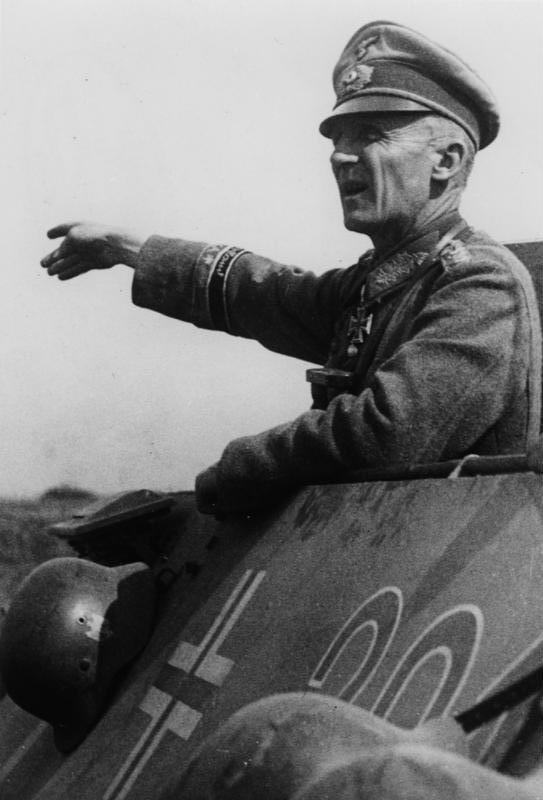
General der Panzertruppe Hasso von Manteuffel in 1944

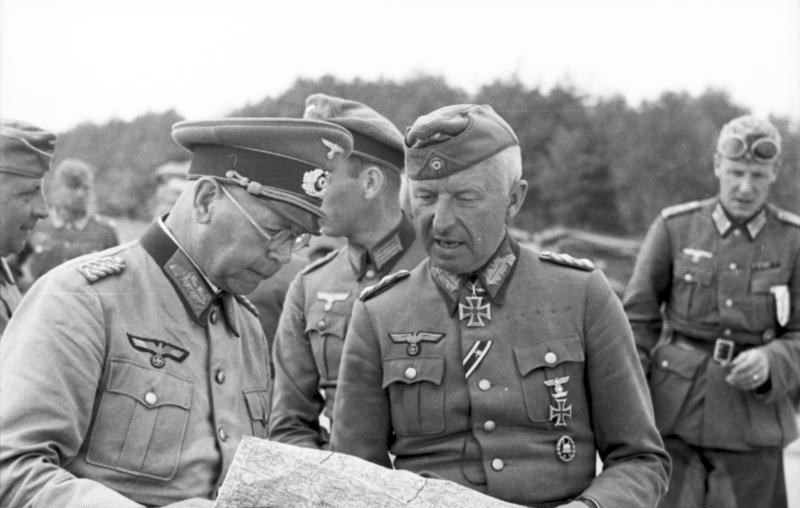
General der Panzertruppe Erich Brandenberger (left) with Generalfeldmarschall Erich von Manstein in 1941

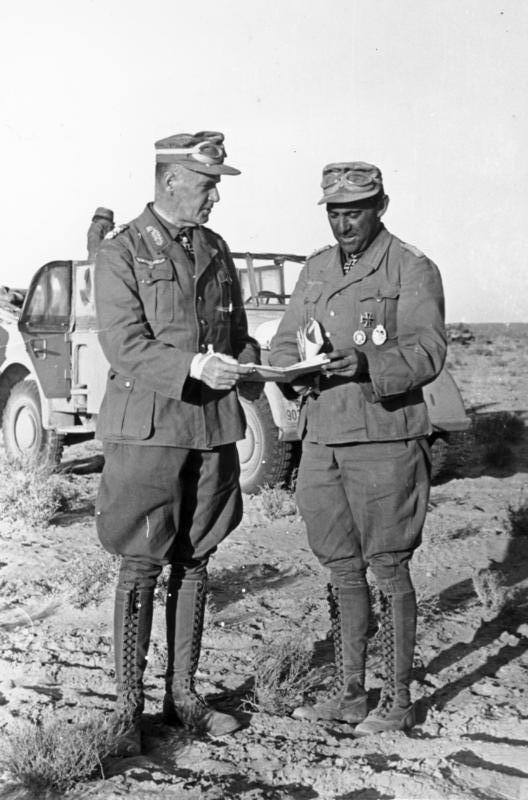
General der Panzertruppe Ludwig Crüwell (left) in North Africa in 1942

== Literature ==
- Reinhard Stumpf: Die Wehrmacht-Elite. Rang- und Herkunftsstruktur der deutschen Generale und Admirale 1933–1945. Harald Boldt Verlag, Boppard am Rhein, 1982. ISBN 3-7646-1815-9.

== See also ==
- General (Germany)
- Comparative officer ranks of World War II
- Panzertruppe

| junior Rank; Generalleutnant | (German officer rank); General der Panzertruppe | senior Rank; Generaloberst |
