= Hermann Balck =

German Army general

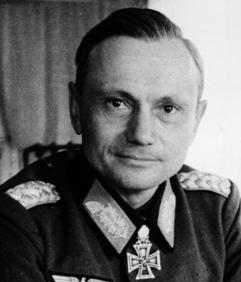
- Balck in 1943
- Born: 7 December 1893; Danzig, German Empire
- Died: 29 November 1982 (aged 88); Asperg, West Germany
- Burial place: Hasefriedhof, Osnabrück
- Relatives: William Balck (father)
- Military career
- Allegiance: German Empire; Weimar Republic; Nazi Germany
- Branch: German Army
- Service years: 1913–1945
- Rank: General der Panzertruppe
- Commands: 11th Panzer Division; Großdeutschland Division; XIV Panzer Corps; XXXXVIII Panzer Corps; 4th Panzer Army; Army Group G 6th Army
- Conflicts: World War I; World War II; Battle of France; Battle of Greece; Battle of Stalingrad; Tatsinskaya Raid; Italian Campaign; Operation Avalanche; Lvov-Sandomierz Offensive; Western Front; Lorraine Campaign; Battle of Hungary; Siege of Budapest; Lake Balaton Offensive; Vienna Offensive
- Awards: Knight's Cross of the Iron Cross with Oak Leaves, Swords and Diamonds

Georg Otto Hermann Balck (7 December 1893 – 29 November 1982) was a highly decorated officer of the German Army who served in both World War I and World War II, rising to the rank of General der Panzertruppe.

== Early career ==
Balck was born in Danzig - Langfuhr, present-day Wrzeszcz in Poland. He was the son of William Balck and his wife Mathilde, née Jensen. His family had a long military tradition, and his father was a senior officer in the Imperial German Army.

On 10 April 1913 Balck entered the Hanoverian Rifle Battalion 10 in Goslar as a cadet. From 12 February 1914 he attended the Hanoverian Military College, where he remained until called up with the outbreak of the First World War in August.

Balck served as a mountain infantry officer, and his unit played a key role in the Schlieffen Plan, leading the crossing at Sedan. He fought on the western, eastern, Italian and Balkan fronts. He served three years as a company commander, ending the war in command of a machine-gun company. At one point he led an extended patrol that operated independently behind Russian lines for several weeks. Over the course of the war he was wounded seven times and awarded the Iron Cross First Class. Balck was nominated for Prussia's highest honor, the Pour le Mérite, in October 1918, but the war ended before his citation completed processing.

During the interwar period Balck was selected as one of the 4,000 officers to continue on in the military serving in the Reichswehr. He transferred to the 18th Cavalry Regiment in 1922, and remained with that unit for 12 years. Balck twice turned down a post in the German General Staff, the normal path for advancing to high rank in the German army, preferring instead to remain a line officer.

== World War II ==
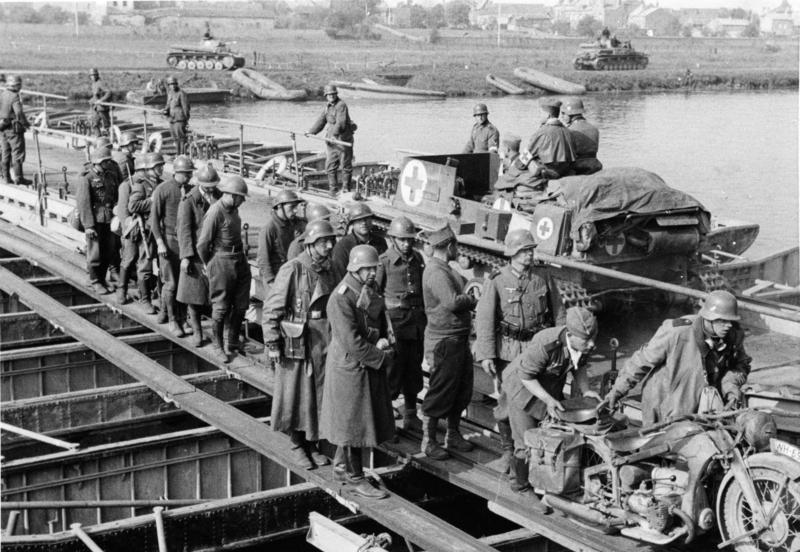
1st Panzer Division crossing a pontoon bridge on the Meuse near Sedan, 1940.

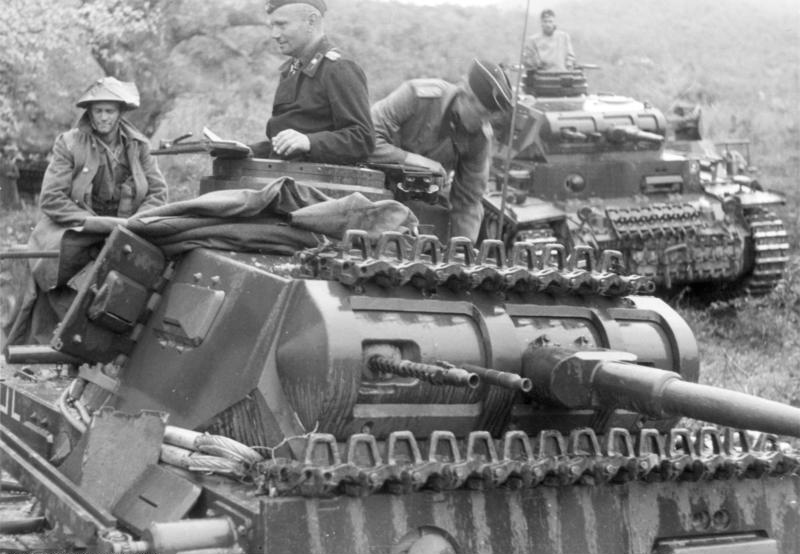
Balck in command vehicle in Greece, April 1941

At the outbreak of World War II in 1939, Balck was serving in the Oberkommando des Heeres (OKH) as a staff officer in the Inspectorate of Motorized Troops, which was in charge of refitting and reorganizing the growing panzer forces. In October he was placed in command of one of the mechanised regiments of the 1st Panzer Division, with which he served during the Battle of France. The 1st Panzer Division made up a part of Guderian's panzer corps. Balck's regiment spearheaded a crossing over the Meuse, and established a bridgehead on the far side.

During the winter of 1940 through the spring of 1941 he commanded a panzer regiment, and led this unit during the Battle of Greece. He later commanded a panzer brigade in the same division. He returned to staff duties with the OKH in the Inspectorate of Armoured Forces in July 1941. In May 1942, Balck went to the Eastern Front in command of the 11th Panzer Division in Ukraine and southern Russia. Following the encirclement of the 6th Army at Stalingrad in the Soviet Operation Uranus, the German southern front faced a generalized collapse. Balck's division took part in the efforts to stop the Soviet advance. In battles along the Chir River his division destroyed an entire Soviet Tank Corps and much of the Soviet 5th Tank Army. For this and other achievements Balck was made one of only twenty-seven officers in the entire war who received the Knight's Cross with Oak Leaves, Swords, and Diamonds.

Balck was then given command of the Heer's elite unit Großdeutschland Division, which he led during the April–June 1943 lull. After a brief posting to Italy in which he commanded the XIV Panzer Corps, he returned to command the XLVIII Panzer Corps on the Eastern Front in December 1943, as well as the operations against the Soviet winter/spring offensive in western Ukraine in 1944. In July 1944 Balck commanded the Corps during the initial phase of the Soviet Lvov-Sandomierz Offensive. He was closely involved in the failed relief attempt of the encircled XIII Army Corps in the Brody pocket, where it was destroyed. In August 1944 he assumed command of the 4th Panzer Army.

In September 1944 Balck was transferred from 4th Panzer Army in Poland to the Western Front to command Army Group G in relief of General Johannes Blaskowitz in the Alsace region of France. Balck was unable to stop the Allied advance under General George S. Patton, and in late December he was relieved of command of Army Group G and placed in the officer reserve pool. By the intervention of General Heinz Guderian he was transferred to command the reconstituted 6th Army in Hungary, which also had operational control of two Hungarian armies. Balck's unit surrendered to the U.S. XX Corps in Austria on 8 May 1945.

== Postwar life ==
Balck was a POW and remained in captivity until 1947. He declined to participate in the US Army Historical Division's study on the war. After the war, Balck found employment as a depot worker. In 1948, he was arrested for the illegal execution of artillery commander Lieutenant-Colonel Johann Schottke. The incident in question occurred while Balck served as commander of Army Group G on the western front. On 28 November 1944 near Saarbrücken, Schottke's unit had failed to provide its supportive artillery fire upon its target area. When searched, he was found drunk on duty. Balck held a summary judgment and Schottke was executed by firing squad, without a court-martial. Balck was found guilty of manslaughter and sentenced to three years in prison, of which he served 18 months.

In 1950, Balck was sentenced by a French military court in Colmar to 20 years of hard labour for his role in the scorched earth Operation Waldfest, but was never extradited.

In the late 1970s and early 1980s Balck and Friedrich von Mellenthin participated in seminars and panel discussions with senior NATO leaders at the US Army War College in Carlisle, Pennsylvania.

== Career assessment ==
According to the historian David T. Zabecki, Balck was considered a gifted commander of armored troops, exemplified by his handling of 11th Panzer Division and XLVIII Panzer Corps during 1942–43. In reviewing Balck's command of the division during the Chir River crisis of December 1942, U.S. General William DePuy estimated Balck to have been "perhaps the best division commander in the German Army." The most recent biography by historian Philip Bujak is more critical and reveals Balck's involvement in war crimes in Gerardmer in Alsace and his deliberate failure to relieve Budapest as aspects of his career Balck tried to avoid in his later memoirs.

Some battles Balck directed are described in Panzer Battles, the memoir of the former general Friedrich von Mellenthin, whom he met when Balck's 11th Panzer Division came under the command of the XLVIII Panzer Corps. At the time Mellenthin was serving as Chief of Staff of the XLVIII Panzer Corps.

Balck started the war as an Oberstleutnant (lieutenant-colonel) in 1939 and ended it as a General der Panzertruppe (general of armoured troops). Balck was one of only twenty-seven officers in the Wehrmacht to receive the Knight's Cross with Oak Leaves, Swords, and Diamonds. His career was detailed in contrast to that of Alfred Jodl in Weapons and Hope by Freeman Dyson. Balck's own autobiography is entitled Ordnung im Chaos: Erinnerungen, 1893-1948.

== Awards ==
- Iron Cross (1914)
  - 2nd Class (15 October 1914)
  - 1st Class (26 November 1914)
- Knight of the House Order of Hohenzollern with Swords (3 December 1917)
- Military Merit Order, 4th class with Swords (Bavaria; 15 November 1914)
- Military Merit Cross 3rd Class (Austria-Hungary; 28 February 1916)
- Order of Bravery, 3rd class, 1st stage with Swords (Bulgaria; 2 December 1941)
- Wound Badge (1918) in Gold (10 May 1918)
- Clasp to the Iron Cross (1939)
  - 2nd Class (12 May 1940)
  - 1st Class (13 May 1940)
- Knight's Cross of the Iron Cross with Oak Leaves, Swords and Diamonds
  - Knight's Cross on 3 June 1940 as Oberstleutnant and commander of Schützen-Regiment 1
  - 155th Oak Leaves on 20 December 1942 as Generalmajor and commander of the 11. Panzer-Division
  - 25th Swords on 4 March 1943 as Generalleutnant and commander of the 11. Panzer-Division
  - 19th Diamonds on 31 August 1944 as General der Panzertruppe and acting commander of the 4. Panzerarmee

Promotions in the Wehrmacht

1 June 1935:	Major (major)
1 February 1938:	Oberstleutnant (lieutenant colonel)
1 August 1940:	Oberst (colonel)
15 July 1942:	Generalmajor (major general)
21 January 1943:	Generalleutnant (lieutenant general)
12 November 1943:	General der Panzertruppe (General of Armoured Troops)

== Works ==
- Balck, Hermann (1981). Ordnung im Chaos / Erinnerungen 1893 - 1948. Biblio, Osnabrück. ISBN 3-7648-1176-5.
- Balck, Hermann (2015). "Order in Chaos: The Memoirs of General of Panzer Troops Hermann Balck" Ed. and Trans. Major General David T. Zabecki, USA (Ret.) and Lieutenant Colonel Dieter J. Biedekarken, USA (Ret.). UP Kentucky, Lexington. ISBN 0-8131-6126-6.
- Caddick-Adams, Peter (2015). Snow and Steel: The Battle of the Bulge, 1944–45. New York: Oxford University Press. ISBN 978-0-19-933514-5.
- Fellgiebel, Walther-Peer [in German] (2000) [1986]. Die Träger des Ritterkreuzes des Eisernen Kreuzes 1939–1945 — Die Inhaber der höchsten Auszeichnung des Zweiten Weltkrieges aller Wehrmachtteile [The Bearers of the Knight's Cross of the Iron Cross 1939–1945 — The Owners of the Highest Award of the Second World War of all Wehrmacht Branches] (in German). Friedberg, Germany: Podzun-Pallas. ISBN 978-3-7909-0284-6.
- Glantz, David M.; House, Jonathan (2009). To the Gates of Stalingrad: Soviet-German Combat Operations, April-August 1942. Lawrence, Kansas: University Press of Kansas. ISBN 978-0-7006-1630-5.
- Mellenthin, Friedrich-Wilhelm von (2006) [1956]. Panzer Battles. Old Saybrook, CT: Konecky & Konecky. ISBN 1-56852-578-8.
- Scherzer, Veit [in German] (2007). Ritterkreuzträger 1939–1945 [The Knight's Cross Bearers 1939–1945] (in German) (2nd ed.). Ranis: Verlag Veit Scherzer. ISBN 978-3-938845-17-2. OCLC 891773959. Wikidata Q131160320.
- Thomas, Franz; Wegmann, Günter (1987). Die Ritterkreuzträger der Deutschen Wehrmacht 1939–1945 Teil III: Infanterie Band 1: A–Be [The Knight's Cross Bearers of the German Wehrmacht 1939–1945 Part III: Infantry Volume 1: A–Be] (in German). Osnabrück, Germany: Biblio-Verlag. ISBN 978-3-7648-1153-2.
- Thomas, Franz (1997). Die Eichenlaubträger 1939–1945 Band 1: A–K [The Oak Leaves Bearers 1939–1945 Volume 1: A–K] (in German). Osnabrück, Germany: Biblio-Verlag. ISBN 978-3-7648-2299-6.
- Ziemke, Earl F. (2002). Stalingrad to Berlin: The German Defeat in the East. Washington D.C.: Center of Military History, US Army. ISBN 9781780392875.

Military offices
Preceded by Generalleutnant Walter Scheller	Commander of 11. Panzer Division; 16 May 1942 – 4 March 1943	Succeeded by General der Infanterie Dietrich von Choltitz
Preceded by General der Panzertruppe Heinrich Eberbach	Commander of XLVIII Panzer Corps; 15 November 1943 – 19 August 1944	Succeeded by General der Panzertruppe Walther Nehring
Preceded by General der Panzertruppe Walther Nehring	Commander of 4. Panzer-Armee; 5 August 1944 – 21 September 1944	Succeeded by General der Panzertruppe Fritz-Hubert Gräser
Preceded by General Johannes Blaskowitz	Commander of Heeresgruppe G 21 September 1944 – 23 December 1944	Succeeded by General Johannes Blaskowitz
Preceded by General Maximilian Fretter-Pico	Commander of 6. Armee; 23 December 1944 – 8 May 1945	Succeeded by none
