= 4th Panzer Army =

Military unit of Nazi Germany

- German: 4. Panzerarmee
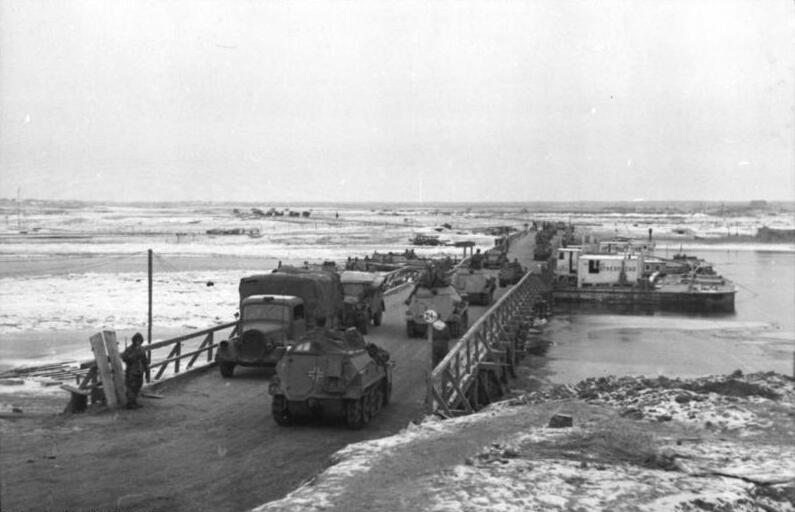
- Fall 1943, 4th Panzer Army in Southern Ukraine
- Active: 15 Feb 1941 – 8 May 1945
- Country: Nazi Germany
- Branch: German Army
- Type: Panzer
- Role: Armoured warfare
- Size: Army; 1 July 1943 (start of the Battle of Kursk): 223,907; 1 November 1943 (Battle of the Dnieper): 276,978; 20 December 1943 (start of the Dnieper-Carpathian Offensive): 358,618; 10 April 1944 (end of the Dnieper-Carpathian Offensive): 247,200
- Engagements: World War II; Operation Barbarossa; Siege of Leningrad; Battle of Moscow; Battle of Voronezh; Battle of Stalingrad; Battle of Kharkov; Battle of Kursk; Battle of the Dnieper; Dnieper-Carpathian Offensive; Lvov-Sandomierz Offensive; Vistula-Oder Offensive

Commanders
- Notable commanders: See Commanders

The 4th Panzer Army (German: 4. Panzerarmee), operating as Panzer Group 4 (Panzergruppe 4) from its formation on 15 February 1941 to 1 January 1942, was a German panzer formation during World War II. As a key armoured component of the Wehrmacht, the army took part in the crucial battles of the German-Soviet war of 1941–45, including Operation Barbarossa, the Battle of Moscow, the Battle of Stalingrad, the Battle of Kursk, and the 1943 Battle of Kiev.

The army was destroyed during the Battle of Stalingrad, but later reconstituted.

== Formation and preparations for Operation Barbarossa ==
As part of the German High Command's preparations for Operation Barbarossa, Generaloberst Erich Hoepner was appointed to command the 4th Panzer Group in February 1941. It was to drive toward Leningrad as part of Army Group North under Wilhelm von Leeb. On 30 March 1941, Hitler delivered a speech to about two hundred senior Wehrmacht officers where he laid out his plans for an ideological war of annihilation (Vernichtungskrieg) against the Soviet Union. He stated that he "wanted to see the impending war against the Soviet Union conducted not according to the military principles, but as a war of extermination" against an ideological enemy, whether military or civilian. Many Wehrmacht leaders, including Hoepner, echoed the sentiment. As a commander of the 4th Panzer Group, he issued a directive to his troops:

The war against Russia is an important chapter in the struggle for existence of the German nation. It is the old battle of Germanic against Slav peoples, of the defence of European culture against Muscovite-Asiatic inundation, and the repulse of Jewish-Bolshevism. The objective of this battle must be the destruction of present-day Russia and it must therefore be conducted with unprecedented severity. Every military action must be guided in planning and execution by an iron will to exterminate the enemy mercilessly and totally. In particular, no adherents of the present Russian-Bolshevik system are to be spared.

— 2 May 1941

The order was transmitted to the troops on Hoepner's initiative, ahead of the official OKW (Wehrmacht High Command) directives that laid the groundwork for the war of extermination, such as the Barbarossa Decree of 13 May 1941 and other orders. Hoepner's directive predated the first OKH (Army High Command) draft of the Commissar Order. The historian Jürgen Förster wrote that Hoepner's directive represented an "independent transformation of Hitler's ideological intentions into an order".

== 1941: Invasion of the Soviet Union ==
4th Panzer Army locations, 1941-42

=== Advance on Leningrad ===
The 4th Panzer Group consisted of the LVI Army Corps (motorised) (Erich von Manstein) and the XXXXI Army Corps (motorised) (Georg-Hans Reinhardt). Their composition was as follows:

- XLI Army Corps (mot.): 1st Panzer Division, 6th Panzer Division, 36th Motorised Infantry Division, 269th Infantry Division
- XXXXI Army Corps (mot.): 8th Panzer Division, 3rd Motorised Infantry Division, 290th Infantry Division
- 3rd SS Motorised Infantry Division Totenkopf
- 2nd SS Motorised Infantry Division Das Reich (during Operation Typhoon)

The Army Group was to advance through the Baltic States to Leningrad. Barbarossa commenced on 22 June 1941 with a massive German attack along the whole front line. The 4th Panzer Group headed for the Dvina River to secure the bridges near the town of Daugavpils. The Red Army mounted a number of counterattacks against the XXXXI Panzer Corps, leading to the Battle of Raseiniai.

After Reinhardt's corps closed in, the two corps were ordered to encircle the Soviet formations around Luga. Again having penetrated deep into the Soviet lines with unprotected flanks, Manstein's corps was the target of a Soviet counteroffensive from 15 July at Soltsy by the Soviet 11th Army. Manstein's forces were badly mauled and the Red Army halted the German advance at Luga. Ultimately, the army group defeated the defending Soviet Northwestern Front, inflicting over 90,000 casualties and destroying more than 1,000 tanks and 1,000 aircraft, then advanced northeast of the Stalin line.

On 6 July 1941, Hoepner issued an order to his troops instructing them to treat the "loyal population" fairly, adding that "individual acts of sabotage should simply be charged to communists and Jews". As with all German armies on the Eastern Front, Hoepner's panzer group implemented the Commissar Order that directed Wehrmacht troops to murder Red Army political officers immediately upon capture, contravening the accepted laws of war. Between 2 July and 8 July, the 4th Panzer Group shot 101 Red Army political commissars, with the bulk of the executions coming from the XLI Panzer Corps. By 19 July, 172 executions of commissars had been reported.

By mid-July, the 4th Panzer Group seized the Luga bridgehead and had plans to advance on Leningrad. The staff and detachments 2 and 3 of Einsatzgruppe A, one of the mobile killing squads following the Wehrmacht into the occupied Soviet Union, were brought up to the Luga district with assistance from the army. "The movement of Einsatzgruppe A—which the army intended to use in Leningrad—was effected in agreement with Panzer Group 4 and at their express wish", noted Franz Walter Stahlecker, the commander of Einsatzgruppe A. Stahlecker described army co-operation as "generally very good" and "in certain cases, as for example, with Panzer Group 4 under the command of General Hoepner, extremely close, one might say even warm".

By late July, Army Group North positioned 4th Panzer Group's units south and east of Narva, Estonia, where they could begin an advance on Leningrad in terrain conditions relatively suitable for armoured warfare. By that time, however, the army group lacked the strength to take Leningrad, which continued to be a high priority for the German high command. A compromise solution was worked out whereas the infantry would attack north from both sides of Lake Ilmen, while the panzer group would advance from its current position. Hoepner's forces began their advance on August 8, but the attack ran into determined Soviet defences. Elsewhere, Soviet counter-attacks threatened Leeb's southern flank. By mid to late August, the German forces were making gains again, with the 4th Panzer Group taking Narva on 17 August.

On 29 August, Leeb issued orders for the blockade of Leningrad in anticipation that the city would soon be abandoned by the Soviets. On September 5, Hitler ordered Hoepner's 4th Panzer Group and an air corps transferred to Army Group Centre effective 15 September, in preparation for Operation Typhoon, the German assault on Moscow. Leeb objected and was given a reprieve in the transfer of his mobile forces, with the view of making one last push towards Leningrad. The 4th Panzer Group was to be the main attacking force, which reached south of the Neva River, where it was faced with strong Soviet counter-attacks. By 24 September, Army Group North halted its advance and transferred the 4th Panzer Group to Army Group Centre.

=== Battle of Moscow ===
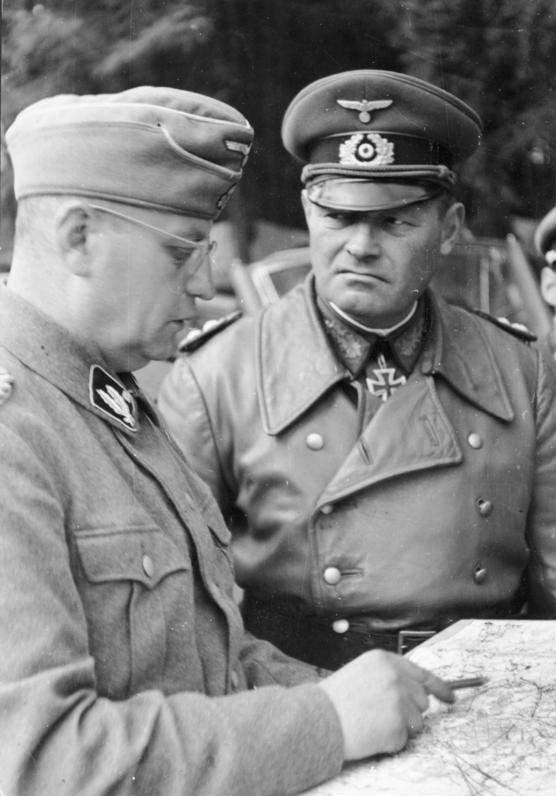
Erich Hoepner (right) with commander of the SS Polizei Division, Walter Krüger, October 1941

As part of Operation Typhoon, the 4th Panzer Group was subordinated to the 4th Army under the command of Günther von Kluge. In early October, the 4th Panzer Group completed the encirclement at Vyazma. Kluge instructed Hoepner to pause the advance, much to the latter's displeasure, as his units were needed to prevent break-outs of Soviet forces. Hoepner was confident that the clearing of the pocket and the advance on Moscow could be undertaken at the same time and viewed Kluge's actions as interference, leading to friction and "clashes" with his superior, as he wrote in a letter home on 6 October. Hoepner did not seem to appreciate that his units were very short on fuel; the 11th Panzer Division, reported having no fuel at all. Only the 20th Panzer Division was advancing towards Moscow amid deteriorating road conditions.

Once the Vyazma pocket was eliminated, other units were able to advance on 14 October. Heavy rains and onset of the rasputitsa (roadlessness) caused frequent damage to tracked vehicles and motor transport further hampering the advance. By early November, the 4th Panzer Group was depleted from earlier fighting and the weather but Hoepner, along with other panzer group commanders and Fedor von Bock, commander of Army Group Center, was impatient to resume the offensive.

On 17 November, the 4th Panzer Group attacked again towards Moscow alongside the V Army Corps of the 4th Army, as part of the continuation of Operation Typhoon by Army Group Centre. The panzer group and the army corps represented Kluge's best forces, most ready for a continued offensive. In two weeks' fighting, Hoepner's forces advanced 60 km (37 mi) (4 km (2.5 mi) per day). Lacking strength and mobility to conduct battles of encirclement, the Group undertook frontal assaults which proved increasingly costly. A lack of tanks, insufficient motor transport and a precarious supply situation, along with tenacious Red Army resistance and the air superiority achieved by Soviet fighters hampered the attack.

The 3rd Panzer Group further north saw slightly better progress, averaging 6 km (3.7 mi) a day. The attack by the 2nd Panzer Group on Tula and Kashira, 125 km (78 mi) south of Moscow, achieved only fleeting and precarious success, while Guderian vacillated between despair and optimism, depending on the situation at the front. Facing pressure from the German High Command, Kluge finally committed his weaker south flank to the attack on 1 December. In the aftermath of the battle, Hoepner and Guderian blamed slow commitment of the south flank of the 4th Army to the attack for the German failure to reach Moscow, grossly overestimating the capabilities of Kluge's remaining forces, according to Stahel. It also failed to appreciate the reality that Moscow was a fortified position which the Wehrmacht lacked the strength to either encircle nor take in a frontal assault, again according to Stahel. In contrast Forczyk lays the blame in part on Kluge's disingenuous lack of commitment to the Moscow operation.

As late as 2 December, Hoepner urged his troops forward stating that "the goal [the encirclement of Moscow] can still be achieved". The next day, he warned Kluge that failure to break off the attack would "bleed white" his formations and make them incapable of defence. Kluge was sympathetic since the south flank of the 4th Army had already had to retreat under Red Army pressure and was on the defensive. Hoepner was ordered to pause his attack, with the goal of resuming it on 6 December. On 5 December 1941, with orders to attack the next day, Hoepner called a conference of chiefs-of-staff of his corps. The reports were grim: only four divisions were deemed capable of attack, three of these with limited objectives. The attack was called off; the Red Army launched its winter counter-offensive on the same day.

== 1942: Battle of Stalingrad ==
On 1 January 1942, the 4th Panzer Group was redesignated 4th Panzer Army. The 4th Panzer Army held defensive positions in the spring of 1942 and then was reinforced, re-fit and transferred to Army Group South for Case Blue, its offensive in Southern Russia. Command was transferred to general Hermann Hoth in June. As the operation progressed, Hitler divided Army Group South into two army groups. Army Group A which was composed of the German 17th Army and 1st Panzer Army and Army Group B which was composed of 6th Army and the 4th Panzer Army. The 4th Panzer Army was on 1 Aug 1942 composed of:

- XXXXVIII Panzer Corps (General of Panzer Troops Rudolf Veiel): 14th Panzer Division, 29th Motorized Division, (24th Panzer Division from 6th Army on 14 Aug)
- IV Army Corps (General of Infantry Viktor von Schwedler): 94th Infantry Division, 371st Infantry Division, (297th Infantry-Division from 6th Army on 14 Aug)
- Romanian VI Army Corps (Lieutenant General Corneliu Dragalina): Romanian 1st Infantry Division, 2nd Infantry Division, 4th Infantry Division, 20th Infantry Division

Army Group B's objective was to anchor itself on the Volga while Army Group A drove into the oil fields of the Caucasus. The 4th Panzer Army approached Stalingrad from the south while the 6th Army approached it from the west. Their aim was to meet up at Stalingrad and encircle the Soviet 62nd and 64th armies outside the city. The 6th Army was faced by a strong counterattack by the Soviet forces and failed to meet up with the 4th Panzer Army for three crucial days, allowing the two Soviet armies to withdraw into Stalingrad.

The 4th Panzer Army guarded the outside perimeter of Stalingrad while the 6th Army was engaged in the battle to capture the city. For over two months, the 6th Army was embroiled in vicious fighting in the city; though it was able to take over 90% of the city, it was unable to destroy the last pockets of resistance. On 19 November 1942, the Red Army launched Operation Uranus, a counter-offensive which encircled the entire 6th Army and the 24th Panzer Division of the 4th Panzer Army. The 4th Panzer Army tried and failed to break the encirclement of Stalingrad in Operation Winter Storm. It was destroyed as a result of the battle.

== 1943: Battles of Kursk and Kiev ==
4th Panzer Army locations, 1943-44

The army was then given reinforcements including 160 new tanks. It then was able to halt the Soviet winter offensive in Southern Russia and then counterattacked in the Third Battle of Kharkov, retaking the city in March 1943. The army saw little or no action over the next three months as both sides built up their strength for the upcoming Battle of Kursk.

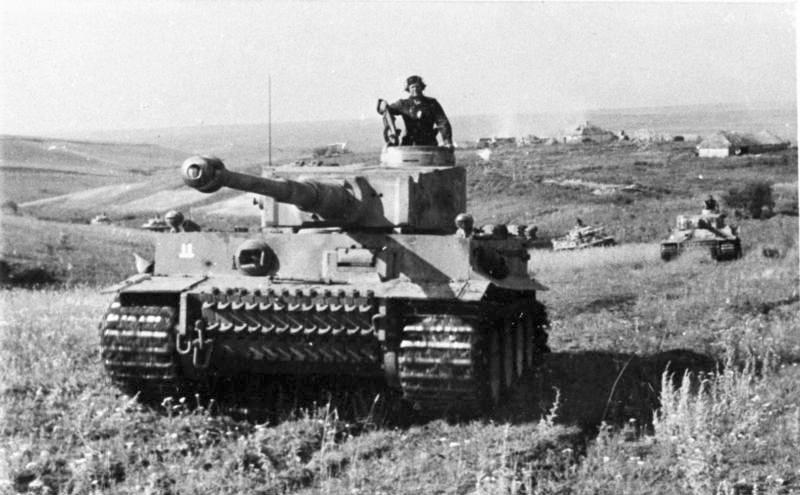
During the Battle of Kursk

The army throughout the spring of 1943 was significantly reinforced and grew to a strength of 1,100 tanks and 250,000 men by July 1943. It was to form the southern spearhead in the Battle of Kursk. The army tried but failed to break through the Soviet defences around Kursk. It then fought a series of defensive battles throughout the remainder of 1943 to hold back the Red Army's Lower Dnieper Strategic Offensive Operation. By November 1943, the Soviets had reached Kiev and the 4th Panzer Army was tasked to defend the city. The Soviet aim was to take the city and break the rail link with Army Group Center or envelop Army Group South. But even though the Soviets had liberated Kiev, broken the Dnieper line, and inflicted massive casualties, the 4th Panzer Army held on and the Soviets failed to break the rail link.

== 1944–45: The retreat ==
By early 1944, the 4th Panzer Army had been pushed back to the pre-war 1939 Polish border. The army defended positions in Ukraine west of Kiev until late June 1944, fighting in the southern regions of the Pinsk Marshes, and around Lutsk, Shepetovka, Tarnopol, and Kovel in western Galicia. However, following the transfer of several of its panzer divisions northwards in the aftermath of Army Group Center's collapse in Operation Bagration, 4th Army was progressively outmatched and forced into a fighting withdrawal by the 1st Ukrainian Front during the Lvov–Sandomierz Offensive. The right flank of 4th Army, including XIII Army Corps, was surrounded and destroyed at Brody in late July, 1944.

By August 1944, Soviet attacks forced a full retreat of the 4th Panzer Army through the area of Chełm and Lublin, ending on the west bank of the Vistula River and an initially successful attempt to contain the Soviet bridgehead at Baranow. In November 1944, the army was composed of:

- LVI Panzer Corps (General Johannes Block)
- XLVIII Panzer Corps (General Maximilian von Edelsheim)
- VIII Army Corps (General Hermann Recknagel)
Positions of 4th Panzer Army in 1945
One corps of the 4th PzA was encircled in the Halbe Pocket in late April 1945.

The defense along the Vistula took place from August 1944 until the renewed Soviet offensive in January 1945. By January 1945, the 4th Panzer Army was holding static defensive positions on Hitler's direct orders and during the lull in the fighting it had created a defensive zone in southern Poland.

On 1 January 1945, the 4th Panzer Army, then under Army Group A, had a total strength of 133,474 men spread across seven infantry divisions (68th, 72nd, 88th, 168th, 291st, 304th, 342nd), two Panzergrenadier divisions (10th, 20th), two panzer divisions (16th, 17th), two autonomous brigades, an autonomous regiment and several autonomous artillery detachments. With its manpower, it was the largest single contributor to Army Group A's overall manpower of 400,556.

Unknown to the Wehrmacht, the Soviet command planned to saturate the entire defensive zone with artillery bombardment. The Red Army began their Vistula–Oder Offensive on January 17, quickly encircling the LVI Panzer Corps and destroying half of all armoured forces concentrated with the 4th Panzer Army. The commander of the LVI Corps, General Johannes Block, was killed in action on 26 January. The remnants of the army retreated along the entire front before re-grouping on the western bank of the Oder River in February 1945.

The Red Army halted its offensive in February 1945. The 3rd Panzer Army was tasked to halt the Soviets in the north, while the 9th Army was guarding against the Soviets in the centre. During February 1945, the 4th Panzer Army defended along the Oder River, containing the Soviet bridgehead at Steinau on the Oder. In March and the first half of April 1945, the army concentrated on defenses along the Lusatian Neisse River between Görlitz and Guben.

On April 16, 1945, the Red Army renewed its offensive by crossing the Oder River. While the 9th Army held the Soviet forces at the Battle of Seelow Heights, the 4th Panzer Army was being pushed back. V Corps of the retreating 4th Panzer Army was pushed into the operational region of the German 9th Army, forming a pocket of some 80,000 men. The Red Army then encircled this force in a pocket in the Spree Forest south of the Seelow Heights and west of Frankfurt. Some of the 4th Panzer Army troops trapped in the Halbe Pocket broke out to the west and surrendered to the US Army on the west bank of the Elbe River. The bulk of the 4th Panzer Army was pushed south of Dresden into the Ore Mountains where it surrendered to the Red Army in the wake of the early May 1945 Prague Offensive.

== Aftermath ==
One of the 4th Panzer Army commanders, Erich Hoepner, was executed for his role in the 20 July plot.

Following the end of the war, one of the 4th Panzer Army former commanders, Hermann Hoth, was tried in the High Command Trial, one of the Subsequent Nuremberg Trials. Explaining his harsh measures against Jews and other civilians, he claimed that "it was a matter of common knowledge in Russia that it was the Jew in particular who participated in a very large extent in sabotage, espionage, etc." Hoth was found guilty of war crimes and crimes against humanity. On 27 October 1948, he was sentenced to 15 years in prison. In January 1951, the sentence was reviewed with no changes. Hoth was released on parole in 1954; his sentence was reduced to time served in 1957.

None of the other commanders ever faced charges.

== Commanders ==
| No. | Portrait | Commander | Took office | Left office | Time in office |
|---|---|---|---|---|---|
| 1 | Erich Hoepner | Generaloberst; Erich Hoepner (1886–1944) | 15 February 1941 | 7 January 1942 | 326 days |
| 2 | Richard Ruoff | Generaloberst; Richard Ruoff (1883–1967) | 8 January 1942 | 31 May 1942 | 143 days |
| 3 | Hermann Hoth | Generaloberst; Hermann Hoth (1885–1971) | 31 May 1942 | 10 November 1943 | 1 year, 163 days |
| 4 | Erhard Raus | Generaloberst; Erhard Raus (1889–1956) | 10 November 1943 | 21 April 1944 | 163 days |
| 5 | Josef Harpe | Generaloberst; Josef Harpe (1887–1968) | 18 May 1944 | 28 June 1944 | 41 days |
| 6 | Walter Nehring | General der Panzertruppe; Walter Nehring (1892–1983) | 28 June 1944 | 5 August 1944 | 38 days |
| 7 | Hermann Balck | General der Panzertruppe; Hermann Balck (1893–1982) | 5 August 1944 | 21 September 1944 | 47 days |
| 8 | Fritz-Hubert Gräser | General der Panzertruppe; Fritz-Hubert Gräser (1888–1960) | 21 September 1944 | 8 May 1945 | 229 days |

== See also ==
- Army Group North Rear Area
- Army Group Centre Rear Area
