= Fritz-Hubert Gräser =

German general (1888–1960)

- Born: 3 January 1888; Frankfurt (Oder), German Empire
- Died: 4 November 1960 (aged 72); Göttingen, West Germany
- Military career
- Allegiance: German Empire; Weimar Republic; Nazi Germany
- Branch: German Army
- Service years: 1907–1945
- Rank: General der Panzertruppe
- Conflicts: World War I World War II
- Awards: Knight's Cross of the Iron Cross with Oak Leaves

Fritz-Hubert Gräser (3 January 1888 – 4 November 1960) was a German general in the Wehrmacht of Nazi Germany. He was a recipient of the Knight's Cross of the Iron Cross with Oak Leaves and Swords.

== Awards ==
- Iron Cross (1914) 2nd Class (16 September 1914) & 1st Class (9 October 1916)
- Clasp to the Iron Cross (1939) 2nd Class (24 September 1939) & 1st Class (23 October 1939)
- German Cross in Gold on 8 February 1942 as Oberst in Infanterie-Regiment 29
- Knight's Cross of the Iron Cross with Oak Leaves and Swords
  - Knight's Cross on 19 July 1940 Oberst and commander of the Infanterie-Regiment 29 (motorized)
  - Oak Leaves on 26 June 1944 as Generalleutnant and commander of the 3. Panzergrenadier-Division
  - Swords on 8 May 1945 as als General der Panzertruppe and commanding officer of the 4. Panzerarmee (Note: Fritz-Hubert Gräser's nomination by the troop was received by the Heerespersonalamt (HPA—Army Personnel Office) on 29 April 1945. General Ernst Maisel noted: "I approve the nomination! 30 April". The nomination list for the higher grades of the Knight's Cross of the Iron Cross only notes the nomination entry date as 29 April 1945. There is no indication that the award was granted (However, the contemporary photograph of him seen to the right clearly shows him wearing this award). The paperwork was not finalized by the end of the war. The Association of Knight's Cross Recipients (AKCR) claims that the award was presented in accordance with the Dönitz-decree. This is illegal according to the Deutsche Dienststelle (WASt) and lacks legal justification.)

Military offices
Preceded by none	Commander of 3. Panzergrenadier-Division; 1 March 1943 – March 1944	Succeeded by Generalmajor Hans Hecker
Preceded by General der Panzertruppe Walther Nehring	Commander of XLVIII Panzer Corps; 19 August 1944 – 20 September 1944	Succeeded by General der Panzertruppe Maximilian Reichsfreiherr von Edelsheim
Preceded by General der Panzertruppe Hermann Balck	Commander of 4. Panzer-Armee; 21 September 1944 – 8 May 1945	Succeeded by none
