= Hans von Funck =

German general in the Wehrmacht during World War II

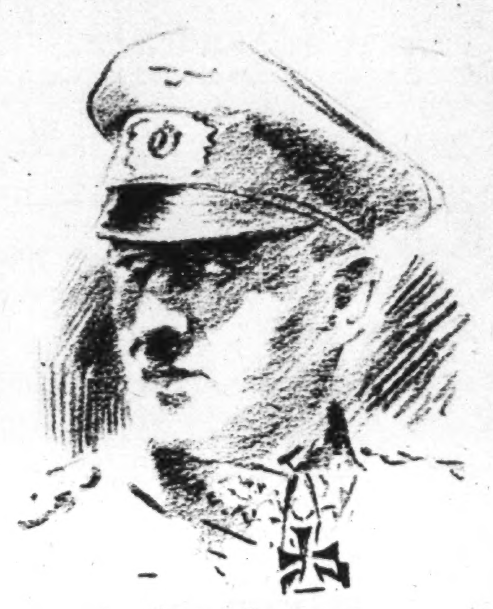
- Born: 23 December 1891; Aachen, Rhine Province, Kingdom of Prussia, German Empire
- Died: 14 February 1979 (aged 87); Viersen, North Rhine-Westphalia, West Germany
- Military career
- Allegiance: German Empire; Weimar Republic; Nazi Germany
- Branch: German Army
- Service years: 1914–1945
- Rank: General der Panzertruppe
- Nickname: Funck
- Commands: 7th Panzer Division; XXXXVII Panzer Corps
- Conflicts: World War I Spanish Civil War; World War II
- Awards: Knight's Cross of the Iron Cross with Oak Leaves

Hans Emil Richard Freiherr von Funck (23 December 1891 – 14 February 1979) was a German general in the Wehrmacht during World War II, who commanded the 7th Panzer Division and the XXXXVII Panzer Corps.

== Early life ==
Hans Emil Richard Freiherr von Funck was born in Aachen, Germany. He was the son of the president of the Prussian region of Köslin, Paul Johannes von Funck, and Marie von Funck von Lützow. He graduated from a grammar school in Köslin, now Koszalin in Poland.

From Easter 1911 until summer 1914, von Funck studied law in Griefswald and Freiburg.

== Married life ==
On 6 February 1915, von Funck married Göttingen Irmgard von Kritter. They had three children: Hans-Joachim, Ingeborg and Burkhard. In 1939, they divorced.

In 1940, von Funck married a second time to Maria Freiin von Mirbach. They had a son named Arndt.

== Career ==
Funck joined the German army in August 1914, and during World War I he was awarded the Iron Cross, 1st and 2nd class, the Hanseatic Cross of Hamburg and the Wound Badge in silver. Funck was retained in the Reichswehr after the war. In July 1933, he was appointed to the General Staff. In 1936, he served in the Spanish Civil War as a leader of the German National Army in Spain. In 1940, he was appointed as the commander of the 3rd Panzer Brigade.

In 1941, Funck was given command of the 7th Panzer Division as the successor to Erwin Rommel. Originally he was to have commanded the Afrika Korps, but Hitler loathed Funck, as he had been a personal staff officer of Werner von Fritsch until Fritsch was dismissed in 1938. He held this command on the central and southern sections of the Eastern Front. On 15 July 1941, he received the Knight's Cross of the Iron Cross.

On 1 February 1944, Funck was promoted to General der Panzertruppe and appointed as the commanding general of the XXXXVII Panzer Corps, initially on the eastern and later the western fronts. During the Battle for Normandy, he accused Gerhard von Schwerin of "passive resistance, cowardice and incompetence" over the Vire counterattack on 28 July. Less than four hours before the start of Operation Luttich, Gunther von Kluge received an order from Hitler that Heinrich Eberbach rather than Funck was to lead it, although Kluge managed to persuade OKW to postpone the transfer of command.

On 4 September 1944, Funck was moved into the reserve of the OKH. Funck was interned as a war criminal in the Soviet Union from August 1945 until his release in 1955.

== Death ==
Hans Funck died on 14 February 1979 in Viersen, Germany at the age of 87. The cause was specified to be old age.

== Awards ==
- Iron Cross (1914) 2nd Class (12 June 1915) & 1st Class (2 December 1917)
- Hanseatic Cross of Hamburg
- Wound Badge in silver
- Medalla de la Campaña de España (1936-1939)
- Medalla Militar Individual de España
- Clasp to the Iron Cross (1939) 2nd Class & 1st Class (May 1940)
- German Cross in Gold on 14 March 1943 as Generalleutnant and commander of the 7. Panzer-Division
- Knight's Cross of the Iron Cross with Oak Leaves
  - Knight's Cross on 15 July 1941 as Generalmajor and commander of the 7. Panzer-Division
  - 278th Oak Leaves 22 August 1943 on 22 August 1943 as Generalmajor and commander of 7. Panzer-Division

== Bibliography ==
- Beevor, Antony (2009). D-Day: The Battle for Normandy. London: Viking. ISBN 978-0-670-88703-3.
- Patzwall, Klaus D.; Scherzer, Veit (2001). Das Deutsche Kreuz 1941 – 1945 Geschichte und Inhaber Band II [The German Cross 1941 – 1945 History and Recipients Volume 2] (in German). Norderstedt, Germany: Verlag Klaus D. Patzwall. ISBN 978-3-931533-45-8.
- Scherzer, Veit (2007). Die Ritterkreuzträger 1939–1945 Die Inhaber des Ritterkreuzes des Eisernen Kreuzes 1939 von Heer, Luftwaffe, Kriegsmarine, Waffen-SS, Volkssturm sowie mit Deutschland verbündeter Streitkräfte nach den Unterlagen des Bundesarchives [The Knight's Cross Bearers 1939–1945 The Holders of the Knight's Cross of the Iron Cross 1939 by Army, Air Force, Navy, Waffen-SS, Volkssturm and Allied Forces with Germany According to the Documents of the Federal Archives] (in German). Jena, Germany: Scherzers Militaer-Verlag. ISBN 978-3-938845-17-2.
- Thomas, Franz (1997). Die Eichenlaubträger 1939–1945 Band 1: A–K [The Oak Leaves Bearers 1939–1945 Volume 1: A–K] (in German). Osnabrück, Germany: Biblio-Verlag. ISBN 978-3-7648-2299-6.
