= Strzeczona =

- Village
- Location within Poland
- Coordinates: 53°34′33″N 17°13′13″E
- Country: Poland
- Voivodeship: Pomeranian
- County: Człuchów
- Gmina: Debrzno
- Population: 285
- Time zone: UTC+1 (CET)
  - Summer (DST): UTC+2 (CEST)
- Vehicle registration: GCZ

Strzeczona [stʂɛˈt͡ʂɔna] is a village in the administrative district of Gmina Debrzno, within Człuchów County, Pomeranian Voivodeship, in northern Poland. It is located within the historic region of Pomerania.

Strzeczona was a royal village of the Polish Crown, administratively located in the Człuchów County in the Pomeranian Voivodeship.

== Notable residents ==
- Walter Nehring (1892-1983), German general
