= Ludwig Crüwell =

German Army general during World War II

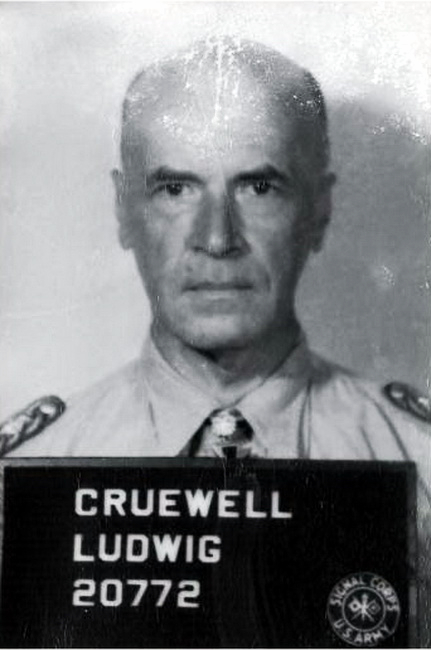
- Mugshot of Crüwell while in American captivity
- Born: 20 March 1892; Dortmund, German Empire
- Died: 25 September 1958 (aged 66); Essen, West Germany
- Military career
- Allegiance: German Empire; Weimar Republic; Nazi Germany
- Branch: German Army
- Service years: 1911–1945
- Rank: General der Panzertruppe
- Commands: 11th Panzer Division; Afrika Korps
- Conflicts: World War I; World War II; Invasion of Poland; Battle of France; Balkan Campaign; Invasion of Yugoslavia; Eastern Front; Operation Barbarossa; North African Campaign; Western Desert Campaign
- Awards: Knight's Cross of the Iron Cross with Oak Leaves

Ludwig Crüwell (20 March 1892 – 25 September 1958) was a German army general who served in the Afrika Korps of Nazi Germany during World War II. He was a recipient of the Knight's Cross of the Iron Cross with Oak Leaves. Crüwell was captured by British forces on 29 May 1942 and was interned at Trent Park, the British camp for high-ranking POW where his conversations were subject to covert surveillance.

== Career ==
Crüwell was born in 1892 in Dortmund and joined the Royal Prussian Army in 1911. He fought in World War I as a junior officer and was awarded the Iron Cross, 1st and 2nd class and the Hanseatic Cross of Hanover. After the end of the war, he remained in the peacetime Reichswehr and transitioned to the Wehrmacht in 1935. Crüwell became commander of the 11th Panzer Division in August 1940 and led it during the Invasion of Yugoslavia; he received the Knight's Cross of the Iron Cross afterwards. Then the division took part in Operation Barbarossa; he was promoted to Generalleutnant and received the Oak Leaves to his Knight's Cross.

Crüwell became commander of the Afrika Korps on 31 July 1941, under General Erwin Rommel, who on the same day took command of Panzer Army Africa, consisting of one infantry and two panzer divisions. For health reasons he took actual command on 15 September, and was promoted to General der Panzertruppe on 17 December 1941. On 29 May 1942, Crüwell was inspecting operations by air in Libya. His pilot mistook British troops for Italian soldiers and landed, where Crüwell was taken prisoner.

Crüwell was interned at Trent Park to the north of London, known as the "Cockfosters Cage", a Combined Services Detailed Interrogation Centre for senior officers operated by MI19 and equipped with an "M Room" listening facility to secretly record and translate the conversations of the inmates. Here, on March 22, 1943, he was intentionally placed with another POW, General Wilhelm von Thoma. During their conversation, Thoma disclosed intelligence regarding the V-2 rocket, i.e., surprise that London was not yet in ruins from German rockets being tested at Kummersdorf test grounds he had visited. This led to the British investigating Peenemünde and following confirmation, carried out a bombing raid on the Peenemünde facilities which severely disrupted the program.

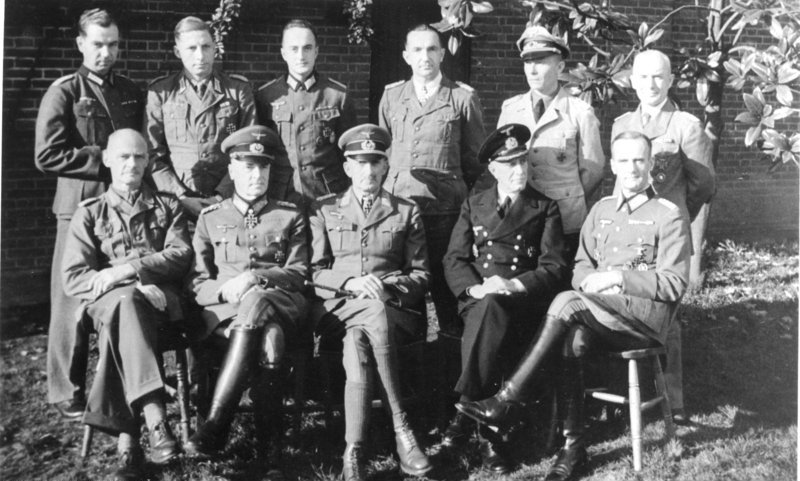
Senior German officers at Trent Park in November 1943. Crüwell is in the front row, second from the left.

Crüwell led the pro-Nazi group of German officers at Trent park, who were outnumbered by those opposed to the regime. The British intelligence files recorded in his character profile that "he tried to impress everyone with his own importance and knowledge, a trouble-maker and a bore". In mid-1944, Crüwell was transferred to a facility in the United States.

After the war Crüwell settled in Essen. He became Chairman of the Veterans Association of the Germany Africa Corps and died on 25 September 1958.

== Awards ==
- Iron Cross (1914) 2nd Class (20 September 1914) & 1st Class (17 September 1916)
- Clasp to the Iron Cross (1939) 2nd and 1st Class 2nd Class (22 May 1940) & 1st Class (6 June 1940)
- Knight's Cross of the Iron Cross with Oak Leaves
  - Knight's Cross on 14 May 1941 as Generalmajor and commander of the 11. Panzer-Division
  - 34th Oak Leaves on 1 September 1941 as Generalleutnant and commander of the 11. Panzer-Division

Military offices
Preceded by none	Commander of 11. Panzer Division; 1 August 1940 – 15 August 1941	Succeeded by Generalleutnant Günther Angern
Preceded by General der Panzertruppe Philipp Müller-Gebhard	Commander of Afrika Korps; 15 September 1941 – 8 March 1942	Succeeded by General der Panzertruppe Walther Nehring
Preceded by General der Panzertruppe Walther Nehring	Commander of Afrika Korps; 19 March 1942 – 28 May 1942	Succeeded by General der Panzertruppe Walther Nehring
