= Rudolf Veiel =

German general during World War II

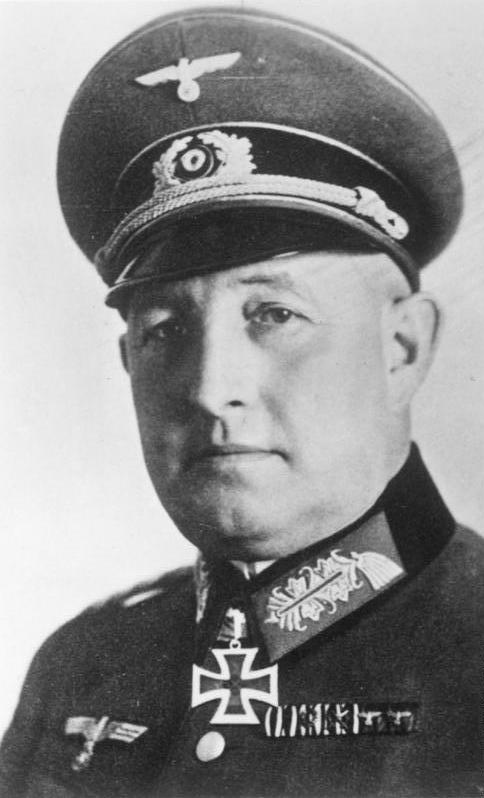
- Born: 10 December 1883; Stuttgart, German Empire
- Died: 19 March 1956 (aged 72); Stuttgart, West Germany
- Military career
- Allegiance: German Empire; Weimar Republic; Nazi Germany
- Branch: German Army
- Service years: 1904–1945
- Rank: General der Panzertruppe
- Commands: 2nd Panzer Division; XLVIII Panzer Corps
- Conflicts: World War I; World War II
- Awards: Knight's Cross of the Iron Cross

Rudolf Veiel (10 December 1883 – 19 March 1956) was a German general (General der Panzertruppe) during World War II.

== Career ==
Veiel joined the army 1904, and was commissioned as an officer in 1905, serving in the Württemberg cavalry during World War I. After the war, Veiel was a member of the Freikorps in Württemberg (1919). From October 1920, he served in the Reichswehr. In 1938 he was given command of the 2nd Panzer Division. Veiel was promoted to oberst in 1933, a Generalmajor in January 1937, and a Generalleutnant in 1938.

In the early stages of World War II, Veiel commanded the division during the Invasion of Poland in 1939, the Battle of France in 1940, Operation Marita, invasion of Yugoslavia and Greece, and Operation Barbarossa in 1941. On 3 June 1940, Veiel was awarded the Knight's Cross of the Iron Cross. From 1 April 1942 to 28 September 1942, after the German defeat in the Battle of Moscow, Veiel was promoted to full general (General der Panzertruppe). He later commanded the XLVIII Panzer Corps. After 28 September, Veiel had a staff position with the Army Group Center.

From September 1943 to 20 July 1944, Veiel was Commanding General of Battle Sector V (Wehrkreis V) in Stuttgart. He was relieved of command because of complicity in the 20 July Conspiracy to assassinate Adolf Hitler. On 16 April 1945 he was put in the Officer Reserve (Führerreserve) of the Army High Command (Oberkommando des Heeres or OKH). After World War II, Rudolf Veiel spent two years in American captivity. He was released in 1947 and died in 1956.

== Awards ==
- Iron Cross (1914) 2nd Class (16 September 1914)
- Iron Cross (1914) 1st Class (8 July 1917)
- Knight's Cross of the Württemberg Military Merit Order (2 August 1917)
- Clasp to the Iron Cross (1939) 2nd Class (18 September 1939)
- Clasp to the Iron Cross (1939) 1st Class (29 September 1939)
- Knight's Cross of the Iron Cross on 3 June 1940 as Generalleutnant and commander of the 2. Panzer-Division
- Bulgarian Order of Military Merit, 1st Class with War Decoration (14 August 1941)

Military offices
Preceded by none	Commander of 2. Panzer-Division; 1 September 1939 – 17 February 1942	Succeeded by General der Panzertruppe Hans-Karl Freiherr von Esebeck
Preceded by General der Panzertruppe Werner Kempf	Commander of XLVIII Panzer Corps; 19 February 1942 – 1 November 1942	Succeeded by Generalleutnant Ferdinand Heim
