= Hans Cramer =

German general in the Wehrmacht during World War II

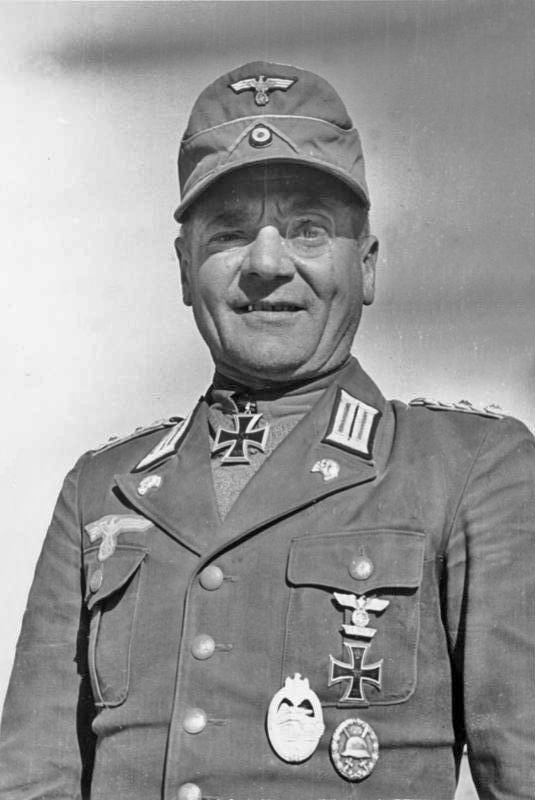
- Cramer in 1941
- Born: 13 July 1896; Minden, Province of Westphalia, Kingdom of Prussia, German Empire
- Died: 28 October 1968 (aged 72); Porta Westfalica, North Rhine-Westphalia, West Germany
- Military career
- Allegiance: German Empire; Weimar Republic; Nazi Germany
- Branch: Prussian Army; Reichswehr; German Army
- Service years: 1914–1944
- Rank: General der Panzertruppe
- Commands: Deutsches Afrika Korps
- Conflicts: World War I World War II
- Awards: Knight's Cross of the Iron Cross

Hans Cramer (13 July 1896 – 28 October 1968) was a German general in the Wehrmacht during World War II.

== Career ==
Cramer enlisted in the Prussian Army on 10 August 1914 and served in World War I; he was retained in the Reichsheer. In September 1939 he took part in the invasion of Poland as commander of a detachment. In March 1941 he was appointed commander of tank regiment in the 15th Panzer Division, which became part of the German Africa Korps. In 1942 Cramer was appointed as Chief of Staff to the Chief of Armoured Troops, Mechanized Troops and Cavalry at the OKH, and then to the post itself. During late 1942 to January 1943 he temporarily commanded the XXXVIII Panzer Corps and the XI Army Corps.

In February 1943 he returned to Africa as commander of the Afrika Korps. On 12 May 1943, with the capitulation of the German forces in North Africa, he was taken prisoner by the British. From 16 May on he was held in the special prison for captured German generals and staff officers at Trent Park. He was exchanged in May 1944 and returned to Germany, reportedly because of his problems with asthma. During his repatriation journey, he was allowed to see Montgomery's 21st Army Group preparing for the invasion of Europe, but was told he was in Kent, where Patton's mythical 1st U.S. Army Group was preparing for its invasion. This was part of the broader Allied deception campaign, Operation Fortitude, prior to D-Day.

Cramer was appointed to Panzer Group West in France as a supernumerary. As a former prisoner of war he fell under suspicion of complicity after the 20 July plot. He was placed under arrest on 26 July, and held in the Gestapo prison on the Prinz-Albrecht-Strasse in Berlin and then in a satellite camp of the Ravensbrück concentration camp until 5 August 1944. In September 1944 he was dismissed from the Wehrmacht. After crossing of Allied forces into German territories he was appointed as Commander-in-chief of all German prisoners of war in Holstein area. Cramer died in 1968.

== Awards ==
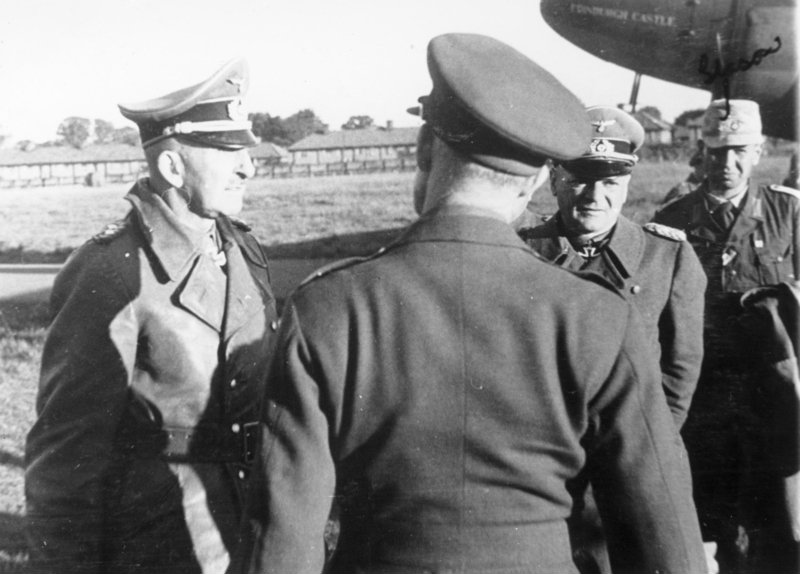
Hans-Jürgen von Arnim (left) and Cramer (centre) in captivity en route to Trent Park camp in 1943

- Clasp to the Iron Cross (1939) 2nd Class (19 September 1939) & 1st Class (3 October 1939)
- Knight's Cross of the Iron Cross on 27 June 1941 as Oberstleutnant and commander of Panzer-Regiment 8 im DAK
- German Cross in Gold on 5 March 1942 as Oberst in Panzer-Regiment 8
