= 2nd Light Division (Wehrmacht) =

German motorized division in the 1930s

- 2. leichte Division
- Active: 10 November 1938 – 18 October 1939
- Disbanded: 18 October 1939
- Country: Nazi Germany
- Branch: Army
- Type: Mechanized
- Role: Mechanized warfare
- Size: Division
- Garrison/HQ: Saalfeld
- Equipment: Panzer I; Panzer II
- Engagements: Invasion of Poland

The 2nd Light Division (sometimes described as a Light Mechanized division) was a motorized division created in 1938 during the German rearmament. It participated in the invasion of Poland. After the end of the Polish campaign the division was converted into a panzer division, forming the 7th Panzer Division.

== Operational history ==
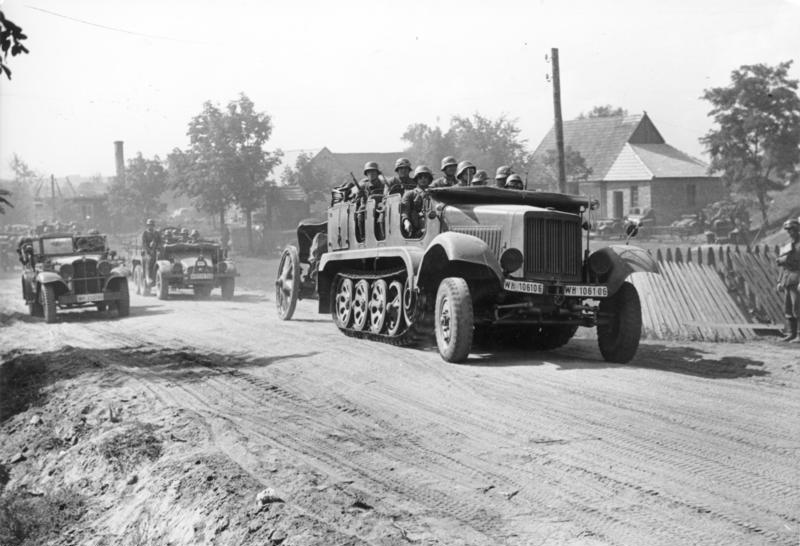
Mechanized forces at the outset of the invasion of Poland

The 2nd Light Division created on 10 November 1938 from the region of Thuringia. The light divisions were created under the instigation of the cavalry arm of the German Army, who feared their scouting and screening roles were being taken over by the Panzerwaffe. The division was designed to provide mobility and some armoured protection to its forces, and was composed of the 6th and 7th Mechanized Cavalry Regiments, the 7th Reconnaissance Regiment, and the 66th Panzer Battalion. These were supported by the 78th Artillery Regiment, the 58th Engineer Battalion and the 42nd Anti-tank Battalion. Its single panzer battalion was equipped with the Panzer I and the Panzer II tanks. Both these vehicles were small, lightly armed and lightly armoured. In 1939 the division was part of the German 10th Army during the Invasion of Poland.

At the outset of the invasion of Poland 1 September 1939, the 2nd Light Division fought its way through the frontier defenses and overran the Warta district, pushing on to reach the outskirts of Warsaw. It was then wheeled back to help deal with the Polish counteroffensive and helped form the encirclement of the Polish forces at Radom 8 September through the 12 September. The division then drove north to reach the Bzura river before turning east and making a drive for Warsaw and the Vistula. Warsaw surrendered on 27 September. The division remained in Poland until 1 October, when it returned to Germany.

== Conversion to panzer division ==
Following the campaign in Poland the limited effectiveness of the light divisions caused the German command to order the reorganization of the four light divisions to full panzer divisions. In October 1939 the 2nd Light Division became the 7th Panzer Division.

== War crimes ==
Soldiers from the 2nd Light Division executued 5 Polish prisoners of war in Stare Kozłowice on 12 September.
