= Afrika Korps =

German expeditionary military force deployed to North Africa

German Africa Corps
- Deutsches Afrikakorps
- Seal of the Afrika Korps
- Active: 21 February 1941 – 13 May 1943
- Country: Nazi Germany
- Branch: German Army
- Type: Expeditionary forces
- Role: Desert warfare Expeditionary warfare
- Size: Corps; June 1941: 33,500 men in total
- Garrison/HQ: Tripoli, Italian Libya
- Engagements: Second World War; North African campaign; Operation Sonnenblume; Siege of Tobruk; Operation Brevity; Operation Skorpion; Operation Battleaxe; Operation Crusader; Battle of Gazala; Battle of Bir Hakeim; 2nd Siege of Tobruk; Battle of Mersa Matruh; First Battle of El Alamein; Battle of Alam el Halfa; Second Battle of El Alamein; Tunisia Campaign

Commanders
- Notable commanders: Erwin Rommel; Ludwig Crüwell; Wilhelm Ritter von Thoma; Walther Nehring

The German Africa Corps (German: Deutsches Afrikakorps, pronounced [ˈdɔʏtʃəs ˈʔaːfʁikaˌkoːɐ̯]; DAK), commonly known as Afrika Korps, was the German expeditionary force in Africa during the North African campaign of World War II. First sent as a holding force to shore up the Italian defense of its African colonies, the formation fought on in Africa, under various appellations, from March 1941 until its surrender in May 1943. The unit's best known commander was Field Marshal Erwin Rommel, whose reputation as one of the ablest tank commanders of the war earned him the nickname "the Desert Fox" (der Wüstenfuchs).

== History ==
=== Organization ===
The Afrika Korps formed on 11 January 1941 and one of Adolf Hitler's favourite generals, Erwin Rommel, was designated as commander on 11 February. Originally Hans von Funck was to have commanded it, but Hitler loathed von Funck, as he had been a personal staff officer of Werner von Fritsch until von Fritsch was dismissed in 1938.

The German Armed Forces High Command (Oberkommando der Wehrmacht, OKW) had decided to send a "blocking force" to Italian Libya to support the Italian army. The Italian 10th Army had been routed by the British Commonwealth Western Desert Force in Operation Compass (9 December 1940 – 9 February 1941) and captured at the Battle of Beda Fomm. The German blocking force, commanded by Rommel, at first consisted of a force based only on Panzer Regiment 5, which was put together from the second regiment of the 3rd Panzer Division. These elements were organized into the 5th Light Division when they arrived in Africa from 10 February – 12 March 1941. In late April and into May, the 5th Light Division was joined by elements of 15th Panzer Division, transferred from Italy. At this time, the Afrika Korps consisted of the two divisions, and was subordinated to the Italian chain of command in Africa.

On 15 August 1941, the German 5th Light Division was redesignated 21st Panzer Division, the higher formation of which was still the Afrika Korps. During the summer of 1941, the OKW increased the presence in Africa and created a new headquarters called Panzer Group Africa. On 15 August, the Panzer Group was activated with Rommel in command, and command of the Afrika Korps was turned over to Ludwig Crüwell. The Panzer Group comprised the Afrika Korps, with some additional German units now in North Africa, plus two corps of Italian units. The Panzer Group was, in turn, redesignated as Panzer Army Africa on 30 January 1942.

After the German and Italian defeat in the Second Battle of El Alamein and the Allied landings in Morocco and Algeria (Operation Torch), the OKW once more increased the presence in Africa by sending the XC Army Corps, under Walter Nehring, in Tunisia on 19 November 1942, upgraded to 5th Panzer Army on 8 December, under the command of Colonel-General Hans-Jürgen von Arnim.

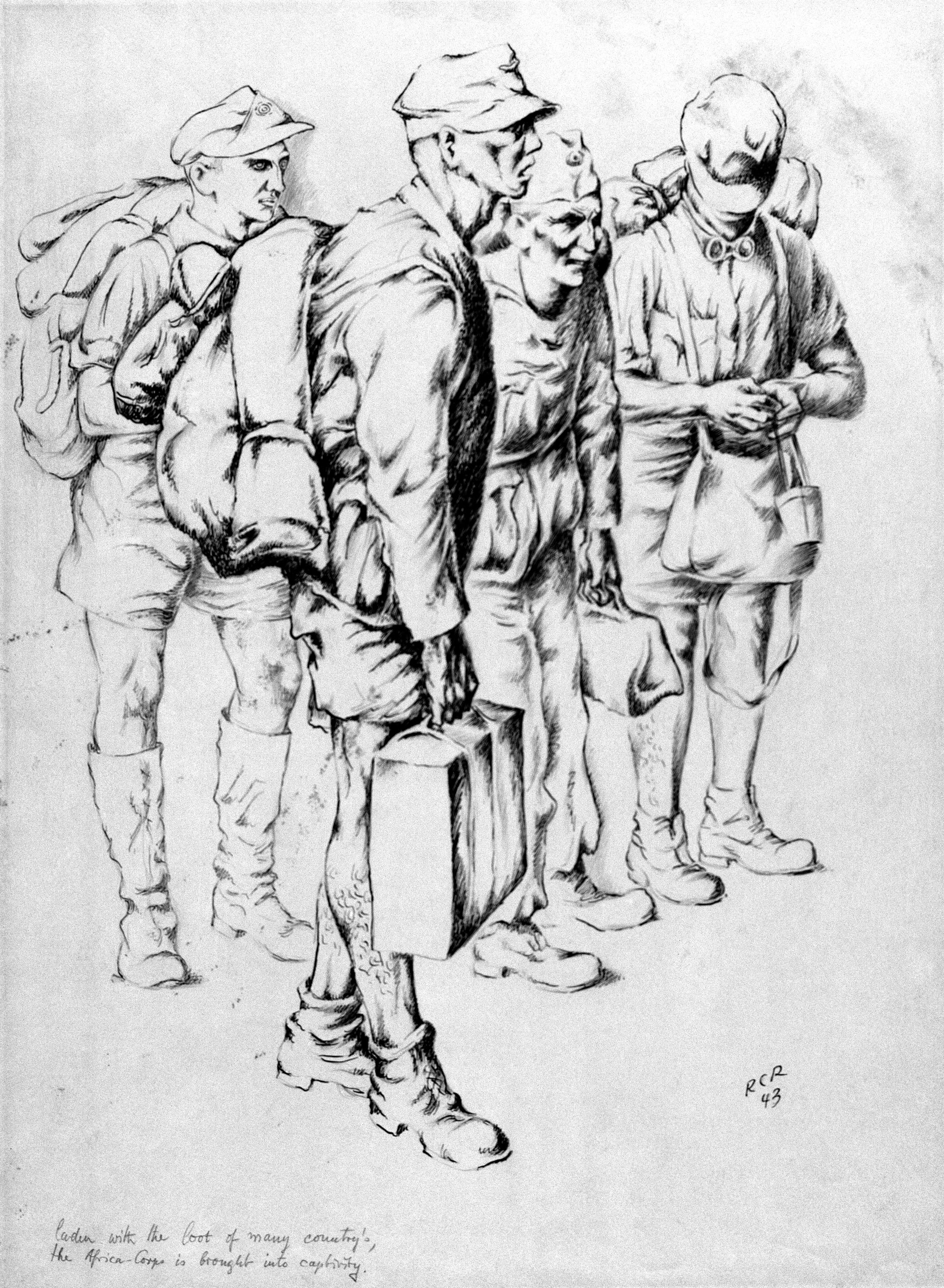
1943 drawing by US army artist Rudolph von Ripper of Afrika Corps prisoners of war, captioned "laden with the loot of many country's [sic], the Africa-Corps is brought into captivity."

On 23 February 1943, the original Panzer Army Africa, which had since been re-styled as the German-Italian Panzer Army, was now redesignated as the Italian 1st Army and put under the command of Italian general Giovanni Messe. Rommel, meanwhile, was placed in command of a new Army Group Africa, created to control both the Italian 1st Army and the 5th Panzer Army. The remnants of the Afrika Korps and surviving units of the 1st Italian Army retreated into Tunisia. Command of the Army Group was turned over to Arnim in March. On 13 May, the Afrika Korps surrendered, along with all other remaining Axis forces in North Africa.

Most Afrika Korps prisoners of war (POW) were transported to the United States and held in Camp Shelby in Mississippi, Camp Hearne in Texas and other POW camps until the end of the war.

== Composition and terminology ==
When Rommel was promoted to the newly formed Panzer Army Africa, his command included a number of Italian units, including four infantry divisions. Two Italian armoured divisions, Ariete and Trieste, initially remained under Italian control as the Italian XX Motorized Corps under the command of General Gastone Gambara.

The Afrika Korps was restructured and renamed in August 1941. "Afrikakorps" was the official name of the force for less than six months but the officers and men used it for the duration. The Afrikakorps was the major German component of Panzerarmee Afrika, which was later renamed the Deutsch-Italienische Panzerarmee and finally renamed Heeresgruppe Afrika (Army Group Africa) during the 27 months of the Desert campaign.

== Commanders ==
- Erwin Rommel: 6 February 1941 – August 1941
- Ludwig Crüwell: August 1941 – May 1942. Crüwell landed near British troops on 29 May and was taken prisoner
- Walther Nehring: May 1942 – September 1942
- Wilhelm Ritter von Thoma: September 1942 – November 1942
- Fritz Bayerlein: November 1942
- Gustav Fehn: November 1942 – January 1943
- Kurt Freiherr von Liebenstein: January 1943 – February 1943
- Karl Bülowius: February 1943
- Heinz Ziegler: February – March 1943
- Hans Cramer: March 1943 (Surrender)

== Treatment of local inhabitants and the Italian colonial government ==
The Afrika Korps gained a reputation by the Allies and by many historians as being magnanimous with Allied prisoners of war. Since then, many historians have used the term "War without hate" to describe the North African campaign as a whole. However, Jewish people suffered during the fascist regime laws, and the local administration took part in the Holocaust deporting some thousands of Jews to Italy, under the supervision of Generalfeldmarschall Albert Kesselring, Wehrmacht commander of the Axis in the Mediterranean theater. Others suffered from forced labour and ill treatment at the hands of the Italian administration, including a Schutzstaffel and SD detachment. Robert Satloff described in his book Among the Righteous: Lost Stories from the Holocaust's Long Reach into Arab Lands that as the German and Italian forces retreated across Libya towards Tunisia, the Jewish population became victims upon which they released their anger and frustration. According to Satloff, Afrika Korps soldiers plundered Jewish property all along the Libyan coast. This violence and persecution only came to an end with the arrival of General Montgomery in Tripoli on 23 January 1943. According to Maurice Remy, although there were antisemitic individuals in the Afrika Korps, actual cases of abuse are not known, even against the Jewish soldiers of the Eighth Army. Remy quotes Isaac Levy, the Senior Jewish Chaplain of the Eighth Army, as saying that he had never seen "any sign or hint that the soldiers [of the Afrika Korps] are antisemitic." The Telegraph comments: "Accounts suggest that it was not Field Marshal Erwin Rommel but the ruthless SS-Standartenführer Walter Rauff who stripped Tunisian Jews of their wealth."

According to Giordana Terracina: "On April 3, the Italians recaptured Benghazi and a few months later the Afrika Korps led by Rommel was sent to Libya and began the deportation of the Jews of Cyrenaica in the concentration camp of Giado and other smaller towns in Tripolitania. This measure was accompanied by shooting, also in Benghazi, of some Jews guilty of having welcomed the British troops, on their arrival, treating them as liberators." Historian Gershom Gorenberg states that Italian authorities were responsible for bringing Jews into their concentration camps, which were "not built to exterminate its inmates", yet as the water and food supply was meager, were not built to keep humans alive either. Also according to Gorenberg, the German consul in Tripoli knew about the process and trucks used to transport supply to Rommel were sometimes used to transport Jews, despite all problems the German forces were having. The Jerusalem Post's review of Gershom Gorenberg's War of shadows writes that: "The Italians were far more brutal with civilians, including Libyan Jews, than Rommel’s Afrika Korps, which by all accounts abided by the laws of war. But nobody worried that the Italians who sent Jews to concentration camps in Libya, would invade British-held Egypt, let alone Mandatory Palestine."

According to Maurice Roumani, "Libyan Jews noted that in daily matters, the Germans largely acted out of pragmatic economic interest rather than adopting the political and ideological practices known elsewhere. The German authorities found Libyan Jews well equipped with goods they needed for their military activities. The Jews complied with their demands, some out of fear and others out of strict economic interest. By the end of their time in Libya, this strategic economic arrangement led the Germans to perceive the Jews as similar to the native Muslims and they therefore regarded the Jews to be less threatening than their brethren in Europe."

== Re-forming of units ==
Certain divisions were re-formed in Europe after the cessation of fighting in Tunisia:

- 15th Panzer Division (as 15th Panzergrenadier Division in Sicily, Italy and Western Front)
- 21st Panzer Division (in France)
- Hermann Göring Panzer Division (in Sicily and Italy)
- 90th Light Division (as 90th Panzergrenadier Division in Italy)

== See also ==
- Fliegerführer Afrika
- Ramcke Parachute Brigade
- Western Desert Campaign
- László Almásy
- Operation Salaam
- Erwin Rommel in the Second World War

== Sources ==
- Beasley, Jimmy Lee (2010). I Was There When It Happened. Xlibris. ISBN 978-1-4535-4457-0.
- Cooper, Matthew (1990). The German Army 1933–1945. Chelsea, MI, USA: Scarborough House. ISBN 0-8128-8519-8.
- Lewin, Ronald (1998) [1968]. Rommel As Military Commander. New York: B&N Books. ISBN 978-0-7607-0861-3 – via archive.org.
- Toppe, Generalmajor Alfred (7 November 1990) [1952], German Experiences in Desert Warfare During World War II (PDF), vol. II, Washington: Department of the Navy, Fleet Marine Force Reference Publication 12-96-II – via theblackvault.com
