= Hans-Jürgen von Arnim =

German general (1889–1962)

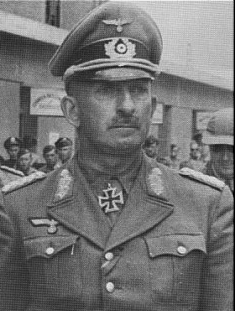
- Born: 4 April 1889; Ernsdorf, German Empire
- Died: 1 September 1962 (aged 73); Bad Wildungen, West Germany
- Military career
- Allegiance: German Empire; Weimar Republic; Nazi Germany
- Branch: Imperial German Army; Reichswehr; German Army
- Service years: 1907–1943
- Rank: Generaloberst
- Commands: 52nd Infantry Division; 17th Panzer Division; XXXIX Panzer Corps; 5th Panzer Army; Army Group Afrika
- Conflicts: World War I; World War II; Operation Barbarossa; Operation Strike
- Awards: Knight's Cross of the Iron Cross

Hans-Jürgen Bernard Theodor von Arnim (German: [hansˈjʏʁɡn̩ fɔn ˈʔaʁniːm]; 4 April 1889 – 1 September 1962) was a German general in the Wehrmacht during World War II who commanded several armies and was the last commander of Axis forces in North Africa. He was a recipient of the Knight's Cross of the Iron Cross.

== Early life ==
Hans-Jürgen Bernhard Theodor von Arnim was born in the town of Ernsdorf in Prussian Silesia on April 4, 1889. His father, Hans von Arnim (1861–1931), was a General in the German Army and Jürgen would follow in his father's footsteps and join the army in 1907. During the First World War he fought on both the Western and Eastern fronts and after the war, he remained in the Reichswehr.

== World War II ==
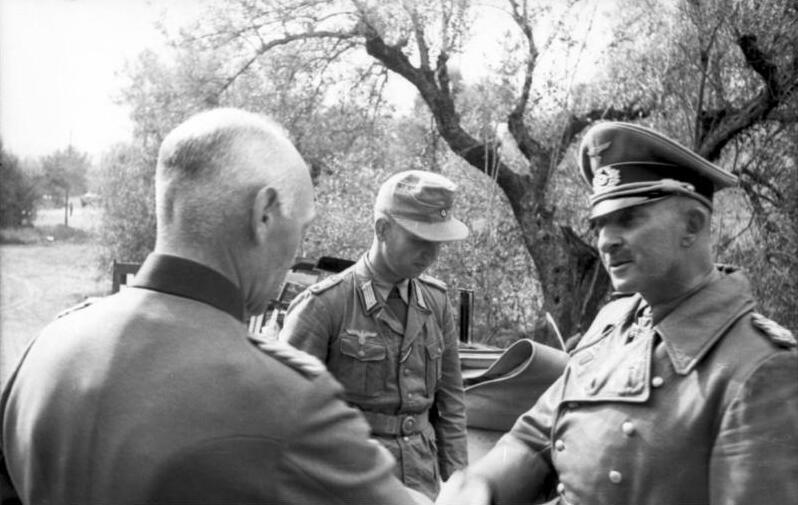
Arnim as commander of Army Group Africa with General Gustav von Vaerst, May 1943

When Hitler and the Nazis came to power in 1933, von Arnim was still in the Reichswehr and continued to serve in the Wehrmacht as a major general. Arnim commanded the 52nd Infantry Division in both the Battles for Poland and France. In October 1940, Arnim was given command of the 17th Panzer Division.

Von Arnim took part in Operation Barbarossa, the invasion of the Soviet Union, and on 1 October 1941, took command of XXXIX Panzer Corps until November 1942.

On 20 February 1943 he was appointed commander of the 5th Panzer Army under Erwin Rommel in North Africa, whom he replaced as commander of the Army Group Africa on the 10th March 1943. He surrendered to British forces on 12 May 1943 as a consequence of the successful allied Operation Strike.

Von Arnim was sent to Britain where he was held and interrogated (as well as bugged) at both Latimer House and Trent Park. He was then interned along with 24 other German general officers at Camp Clinton, Mississippi, and was released on 1 July 1947.

He died in 1962 in Bad Wildungen, West Germany.

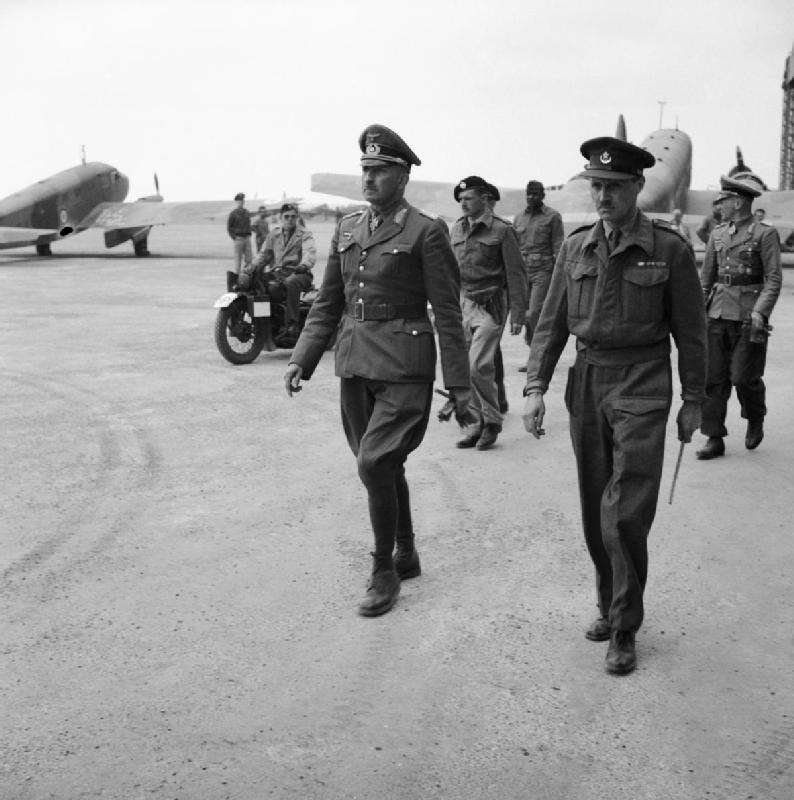
May 1943, Tunisia following the surrender of Axis forces, leaving for England

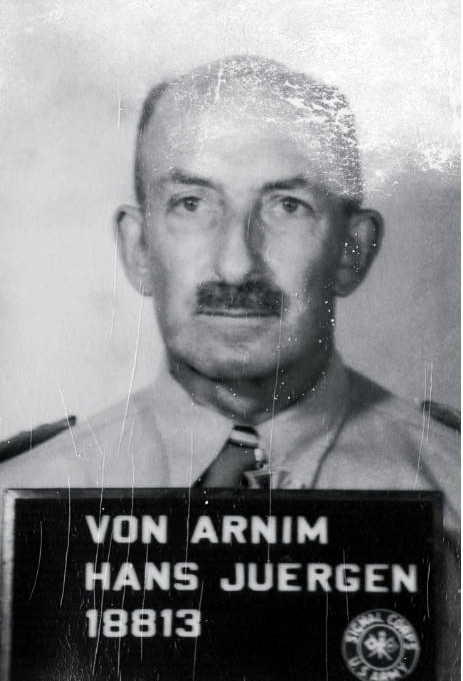
Mugshot while in American captivity

== Mistreatment of Jews in Tunisia ==
The Jewish population of Tunisia was used for forced labour by Arnim to prepare defences against Allied attacks, and the Jewish community was plundered for gold.

== Promotions ==
- Fahnenjunker-Gefreiter (25 May 1908)
- Fahnenjunker-Unteroffizier (18 July 1908)
- Fähnrich (19 November 1908)
- Leutnant (19 August 1909)
- Oberleutnant (27 January 1915)
- Hauptmann (27 January 1917)
- Major (1 April 1928)
- Oberstleutnant (1 April 1932)
- Oberst (1 July 1934)
- Generalmajor (1 January 1938)
- Generalleutnant (1 December 1939)
- General der Panzertruppe (17 December 1941)
- Generaloberst (4 December 1942)

== Awards ==
- Iron Cross (1914) 2nd Class (16 September 1914) & 1st Class (2 November 1914)
- Knight's Cross of the Royal House Order of Hohenzollern with Swords (7 September 1918)
- Wound Badge in Silver (6 August 1918)
- Hanseatic Cross Hamburg Version
- Honour Cross of the World War 1914/1918 (15 November 1934)
- Wehrmacht Long Service Award 1st to 4th Class (2 October 1936)
- Knight's Cross of the Iron Cross on 4 September 1941 as commander of the 17th Panzer Division

Military offices
Preceded by Generaloberst Karl-Adolf Hollidt	Commander of 52. Infanterie-Division; 8 September 1939 – 5 October 1940	Succeeded by Generaloberst Lothar Rendulic
Preceded by General der Panzertruppe Wilhelm Ritter von Thoma	Commander of 17. Panzer-Division; 15 September 1941 – 11 November 1941	Succeeded by Generalleutnant Rudolf-Eduard Licht
Preceded by Generaloberst Rudolf Schmidt	Commander of XXXIX. Panzerkorps; 11 November 1941 – 30 November 1942	Succeeded by General der Artillerie Robert Martinek
Preceded by created	Commander of 5th Panzer Army; 8 December 1942 - 10 March 1943	Succeeded by General der Panzertruppe Gustav von Vaerst
Preceded by Generalfeldmarschall Erwin Rommel	Commander of Heeresgruppe Afrika; 10 March 1943 – 12 May 1943	Succeeded by disbanded
