= Walther Nehring =

German general during World War II

Walter Nehring
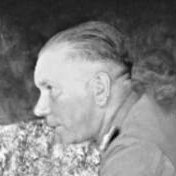
- Born: 15 August 1892; Stretzin, West Prussia, German Empire (now Strzeczona, Poland)
- Died: 20 April 1983 (aged 90); Düsseldorf, North Rhine-Westphalia, West Germany
- Military career
- Allegiance: German Empire; Weimar Germany; Nazi Germany
- Branch: Imperial German Army; Reichswehr; German Army
- Service years: 1911–1945
- Rank: General der Panzertruppe
- Commands: Afrika Korps; LXXXX Army Corps; XXIV Panzer Corps; Fourth Panzer Army; 1st Panzer Army
- Conflicts: World War I; Battle of Mount Kemmel; World War II; Western Desert Campaign; Tunisia campaign; Eastern Front
- Awards: Knight's Cross of the Iron Cross with Oak Leaves and Swords

Walther Nehring (15 August 1892 – 20 April 1983) was a German general in the Wehrmacht during World War II who commanded the Afrika Korps.

== Early life ==
Nehring was born on 15 August 1892 in Stretzin, West Prussia. Nehring was the descendant of a Dutch family who had fled the Netherlands to escape religious persecution in the seventeenth century. His father, Emil Nehring, was an estate owner and officer of the Military Reserve. While Nehring was still a child the family moved to Danzig.

== Career ==
Nehring joined the military service on 16 September 1911 in the Infanterie-Regiment 152. He became a commissioned Leutnant on 18 December 1913.

On 26 October 1940 he received command of the 18th Panzer Division at Chemnitz, which he commanded during the operations Barbarossa and Typhoon. The division led by Nehring stands accused of war crimes by numerous accounts.

Nehring took command of the Afrika Korps in May 1942 and took part in the last major Axis offensive (Operation Brandung) of the Western Desert campaign and the subsequent Battle of Alam Halfa (31 August - 7 September 1942), during which he was wounded in an air raid. Between November and December 1942, he commanded the XC Army Corps, the German contingent in Tunisia.

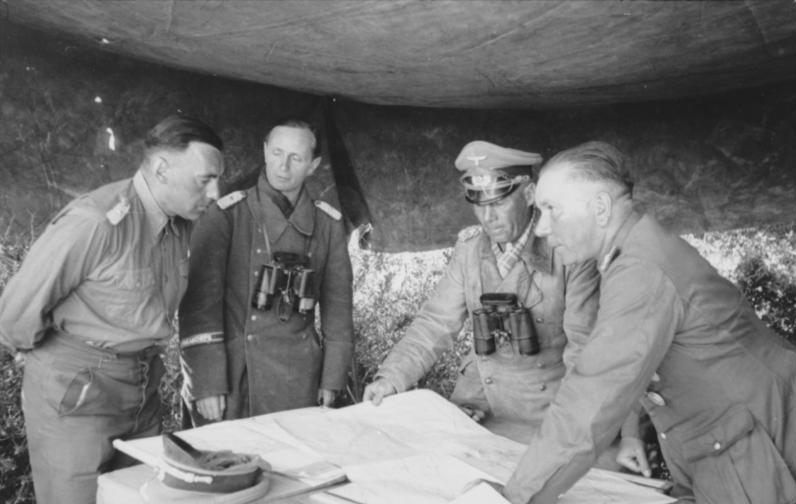
Nehring (right), Fritz Bayerlein (left) and Erwin Rommel, April 1942

After North Africa, Nehring was posted to the Eastern Front where he commanded first the XXIV Panzer Corps, and then from July to August 1944 the 4th Panzer Army. Nehring then returned to the XXIV Panzer Corps in August 1944 and led the Corps until March 1945 when he was made commander of the 1st Panzer Army. During 1944 he was also the commanding officer of the XLVIII Panzer Corps.

Following the end of the war, Nehring wrote a comprehensive history of the German panzer forces from 1916 to 1945, Die Geschichte der deutschen Panzerwaffe 1916 bis 1945. He also wrote the foreword to Len Deighton's Blitzkrieg: From the Rise of Hitler to the Fall of Dunkirk.

== Awards ==
- Iron Cross (1914) 2nd Class (27 January 1915) & 1st Class (25 November 1917)
- Clasp to the Iron Cross (1939) 2nd Class (11 September 1939) & 1st Class (29 September 1939)
- Knight's Cross of the Iron Cross with Oak Leaves and Swords
  - Knight's Cross on 24 July 1941 as Generalmajor and commander of the 18. Panzer-Division
  - 383rd Oak Leaves on 8 February 1944 as General der Panzertruppe and commanding general of the XXIV. Panzerkorps
  - 124th Swords on 22 January 1945 as General der Panzertruppe and commanding general of the XXIV. Panzerkorps
- Bundesverdienstkreuz 1st Class (27 July 1973)

Military offices
Preceded by none	Commander of 18. Panzer-Division; 26 October 1940 – 26 January 1942	Succeeded by General der Panzertruppe Karl Freiherr von Thüngen
Preceded by General der Panzertruppe Ludwig Crüwell	Commander of Afrika Korps; 9 March 1942 – 18 March 1942	Succeeded by General der Panzertruppe Ludwig Crüwell
Preceded by General der Panzertruppe Ludwig Crüwell	Commander of Afrika Korps; 29 May 1942 – 30 August 1942	Succeeded by Oberst Fritz Bayerlein
Preceded by Generaloberst Josef Harpe	Commander of 4. Panzer-Armee; 28 June 1944 – 5 August 1944	Succeeded by General der Panzertruppe Hermann Balck
Preceded by General der Panzertruppe Hermann Balck	Commander of XLVIII Panzer Corps; 4 August 1944 – 19 August 1944	Succeeded by General der Panzertruppe Fritz-Hubert Gräser
Preceded by Generaloberst Gotthard Heinrici	Commander of 1. Panzer-Armee; 19 March 1945 – 3 April 1945	Succeeded by General der Infanterie Wilhelm Hasse
