= 263rd Infantry Division =

- 263. Infanterie-Division
- Active: August 1939 - May 1945
- Country: Nazi Germany
- Branch: Heer (Wehrmacht)
- Type: Infantry
- Size: Division
- Engagements: Western Front; Eastern Front; Operation Barbarossa; Battle of Nevel

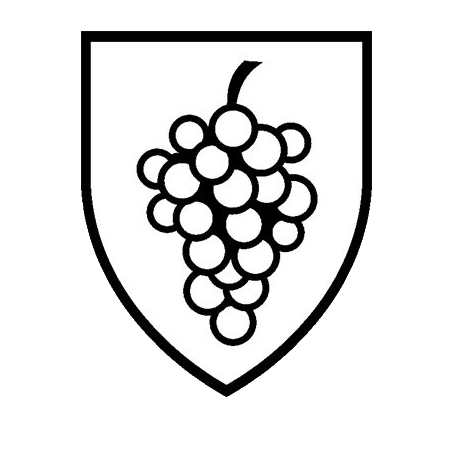
Emblem of the 263rd Infantry Division of the Wehrmacht

The 263rd Infantry Division (German: 263. Infanterie-Division) was an infantry division of the German Heer during World War II.

== Operational history ==
The 263rd Infantry division was formed on 26 August 1939 with reserve unit personnel in Wehrkreis XII at Idar Oberstein as part of the 4. Welle (4th wave of mobilization).

It participated in operations on the Western Front in May 1940, advancing from the Eifel through Belgium with the 4th Army. Then it fought in France in June 1940 first under the 6th Army and later under the 7th Army with which it advanced towards Bordeaux, where it remained until April 1941, before being moved in Poland.

In June 1941, it participated in Operation Barbarossa in the 4th Army under Army Group Centre and advanced to the gates of Moscow.

Throughout 1942, it fought defensive battles in the Yukhnov, Spas-Demensk and Velizh areas until August 1943, when the division was transferred to Army Group North in the sector around Nevel under the 16th Army. The division suffered serious casualties in the Battle of Nevel in Autumn 1943.

It retreated from Leningrad and throughout the Baltics to be cut off in the Courland Pocket, resisting attacks by the Red Army. It remained there for the rest of the war and surrendered to the Soviets on 9 May 1945.

== Commanders ==
- Generalleutnant Franz Karl (August 1939 - October 1940)
- Generalleutnant Ernst Haeckel (October 1940 - March 1942)
- Generalleutnant Hans Traut (June 1942 - April 1943)
- Generalleutnant Werner Richter (April 1943 - May 1944)
- Generalmajor Rudolf Sieckenius (May 1944 - September 1944)
- Generalleutnant Alfred Hemmann (September 1944 - May 1945)

== Sources ==
263. Infanterie-Division on Lexikon-der-wehrmacht
