= 17th Panzer Division =

German army division during World War II

- 17. Panzer-Division
- Unit insignia
- Active: November 1940 – 8 May 1945
- Country: Germany
- Branch: Army
- Type: Panzer
- Role: Armoured warfare
- Size: Division
- Garrison/HQ: Augsburg
- Engagements: World War II; Operation Barbarossa; Battle of Białystok–Minsk; Battle of Moscow; Operation Wintergewitter; Korsun-Cherkassy Pocket; Kamenets-Podolsky pocket; Vistula–Oder Offensive; Silesian Offensives

Commanders
- Notable commanders: Hans-Jürgen von Arnim; Wilhelm Ritter von Thoma

The 17th Panzer Division (German: 17. Panzer-Division) was a formation of the Wehrmacht in World War II. It was formed in November 1940 from the 27th Infantry Division. It took part in Operation Barbarossa, the invasion of the Soviet Union in June 1941, and in the winter of 1941–42 participated in the Battle of Moscow. In November 1942, the division was sent to the southern sector of the Eastern Front where it participated in Operation Winter Storm, the failed attempt to relieve the surrounded troops at Stalingrad. The division was held in reserve during the Battle of Kursk in 1943, and thereafter retreated through Ukraine and Poland, before ending the war in Czechoslovakia.

== Operational history ==
=== Formation ===
The 27th Infantry Division was formed in October 1936 in Augsburg, Bavaria, as a peacetime division of the new German Wehrmacht. The division was mobilised on 26 August 1939 and took part in the Invasion of Poland and the Battle of France. In 1943, a Nazi propaganda book was published about the division's actions in France 1940, titled Über Somme, Seine, Loire (English: Across the Somme, the Seine, the Loire).

The 17th Panzer Division was formed in late 1940, when the 27th Infantry Division was converted to an armored division. In part, the 2nd Panzer Division provided personnel for the new division. The majority of its troops came from the Bavarian region of Swabia, then the Nazi Gau Swabia

=== 1941 ===
In May 1941, the division was transferred to the central sector of the planned attack on the Soviet Union, Operation Barbarossa, and became part of the XXXXVII Panzer Corps, which in turn was part of the 2nd Panzer Group, commanded by Heinz Guderian. The division's commander, Hans-Jürgen von Arnim, was wounded within the first few days of the campaign, on 24 June, but later returned to his unit. His temporary replacement, Karl Ritter von Weber, was mortally wounded south of Smolensk on 17 July, putting Wilhelm Ritter von Thoma in charge until von Arnim returned.

The division crossed the Bug River and advanced south of Minsk, where it made contact with the 3rd Panzer Group. It took part in the Battle of Białystok–Minsk, where it recorded up to 100 Soviet tanks destroyed in a single day, 9 July, at Orsha. It then crossed the river Dnjepr south of Orsha and took part in defensive operations south of Smolensk in August and September.

In October, it took part in the run up to the Battle of Moscow, taking Bryansk on 6 October. The division was then concentrated at Orel and advanced towards Tula, where it was engaged in a failed attempt to encircle the city. With the Soviet counterattack on 5 December, the division started retreating on the 8th, after having reached a point 120 km south east of Moscow. The division took defensive positions northeast of Orel, where it remained until the Summer of 1942.

=== 1942 ===
Cover of the 1943 propaganda book about the division.

After the winter battles, the division was reconstituted near its front line positions in the early summer of 1942. It received approximately 50 tanks of the type Panzer III and Panzer IV. It was engaged in minor attacks north of Orel in September but then went into defensive positions again. The division was then held in Army Group Centre reserve near Bolkhov. At this stage, it only fielded 45 to 50 tanks of varying types (down from a nominal strength of around 200). In October 1942, when Fridolin von Senger und Etterlin took command of the division, it had only 30 operational tanks, and one-third of its trucks were undergoing repairs.

After Operation Uranus, the Soviet counterattack at Stalingrad, the division was quickly transferred to Army Group B in the area of Millerovo. From there, it marched towards Kotelnikovo and joined the 4th Panzer Army for Operation Winter Storm, a relief operation aimed at linking up with the encircled 6th Army, together with the 6th Panzer Division and the 23rd Panzer Division. The operation failed however, and the division retreated at the end of December. Losses were so heavy that the command of the 63rd Panzer Grenadier Regiment laid in the hands of a lieutenant, its original commander having been killed in action. By Christmas Eve 1942, the division fielded only eight operational tanks and one anti-tank gun.

=== 1943 ===
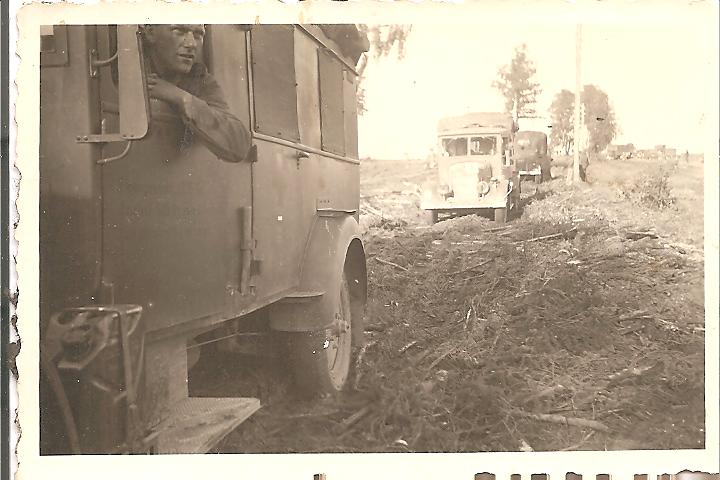
Vehicles of the 17th PD in the Mius region in 1943

The division continued its retreat towards the Don bridgehead at Rostov-on-Don, which it reached at the end of January. The 39th Panzer Regiment was re-equipped with 50 new Panzer IV tanks shortly after and the division took part in counterattacks between the Mius and the Donets rivers. By 27 February, the division had been reduced to less than 2,000 men, six tanks and ten anti-tank guns but avoided further destruction when the Soviet forces withdrew behind the Donets river. After this, it was engaged in tank battles near Belgorod until the end of April.

The division did not take part in the Battle of Kursk. Instead, it stayed in reserve, behind the front line, as part of the XXIV Panzer Corps. It took part in some successful counterattacks after the battle, in the Donets-Izium area. On 20 July, Generalleutnant Walter Schilling became the second division commander of the division to be killed in action. In July, the division had the following strength in tanks, of which 84% were operational: 4 Panzer II; 29 Panzer III; 32 Panzer IV; 2 T-34. In September, the division retreated from the Donets to positions behind the Dnjepr river, taking up a defensive line on the western side of the river. Initially it was posted at Krivoi Rog, in November it moved to Kherson, as part of the re-formed 6th Army.

=== 1944 ===
In late January and early February 1944, the 17th Panzer Division took part in the relief operations for the Korsun-Cherkassy Pocket, as part of the III Panzer Corps. In the end, the involved German tank divisions were halted by the Red Army 12 km from the pocket but the troops inside broke out, abandoning their heavy equipment. It was then part of the 1st Panzer Army in the Kamenets-Podolsky pocket, where it lost most of its own heavy equipment, but escaped as a whole.

It remained in reserve again in April and May, stationed behind the frontline, before taking part in operations around Lviv to counter the Soviet Lvov–Sandomierz Offensive. Until the end of October, the unit took part in operations in the Tarnów region and then south of the Baranow bridgehead, near Sandomierz. From November, it became part of the reserves receiving 80 Panzer IV and Panzer V tanks (Panthers).

=== 1945 ===
With the start of the Soviet Vistula–Oder Offensive on 12 January 1945, the 17th Panzer Division, alongside the 16th Panzer Division were the main reserve forces in the sector, retained for a counterattack to the Soviet advance. Both divisions, stationed too close to the front line due to Hitler's restraining order, suffered heavy casualties through bombardment and had their communications destroyed. Their task, to throw back the Soviet advance, was impossible to achieve.

The division found itself in constant retreat as part of the XXIV Panzer Corps commanded by Walther Nehring, first towards Łódź, then crossing the Oder, where it took positions near Głogów in February. It took part in defensive operations near the Ścinawa (German: Steinau) bridgehead in mid-February. The division had suffered heavy losses during those events and was re-supplied near Görlitz, now renamed Kampfgruppe 17th Panzer Division due to being severely understrength and being no more in size than a regiment. It continued its defensive actions in the region during the Silesian Offensives. The division was eventually forced to retreat into Czechoslovakia, heading towards Brno.

In February 1945, the division, by now reduced to a Kampfgruppe, was attached to Army Group Center on the Oder River. By March 1945, it retreated as far as Jägerndorf by the Red Army. Early in April, it had retreated southwest into Moravia, where in quick succession it came under the order of 17th Army and 1st Army. The division surrendered to the Soviet army near Görlitz at the end of April 1945.

== Commanders ==
Commander	Start	Finish	Notes
Generalleutnant Friedrich Bergmann	1 January 1937	4 October 1940	became commander of 137th Infantry Division, killed in action 21 December 1941
Generaloberst Hans-Jürgen von Arnim	5 October 1940	24 June 1941	wounded in action 24 June 1941
Generalmajor Karl Ritter von Weber	24 June 1941	17 July 1941	acting — wounded in action, died of his injuries 20 July 1941
General Wilhelm Ritter von Thoma	17 July 1941	15 September 1941	Returned to command leader reserve after von Arnim's recovery
Generaloberst Hans-Jürgen von Arnim	15 September 1941	11 November 1941	second spell after recovering from his injuries, became commander of XXXIX Panzer Corps 11 November 1942
Generalleutnant Rudolf-Eduard Licht	11 November 1941	10 October 1942	removed from command and returned to Germany to be put in charge of lower-key divisions
General Fridolin von Senger und Etterlin	10 October 1942	16 June 1943	became German liaison officer to Italian 6th Army in Sicily in June 1943
Generalleutnant Walter Schilling	16 June 1943	20 July 1943	killed in action 20 July 1943 near Doljenjaja
Generalleutnant Karl-Friedrich von der Meden	21 July 1943	20 September 1944	became commander of 178th Reserve Panzer Division 1 October 1944.
Generalmajor Rudolf Demme	20 September 1944	2 December 1944	became commander of 132nd Infantry Division
Oberst Albert Brux	2 December 1944	19 January 1945	captured by the Red Army January 1945
Generalmajor Theodor Kretschmer	1 February 1945	8 May 1945	Surrendered the division in May 1945

== Area of operations ==
Region	Start	Finish
Germany	November 1940	June 1941
Eastern Front — central sector	June 1941	November 1942
Eastern Front — southern sector	November 1942	March 1944
Eastern Front — central sector	March 1944	August 1944
Poland	August 1944	March 1945
Eastern Germany	March 1945	May 1945

== Order of battle in 1944 ==
The 63rd Panzergrenadier Regiment was disbanded in late 1944. The regiment's first battalion became the third battalion of 40th Panzergrenadier Regiment. The second battalion of the 63rd Regiment became the second battalion of the 79th Panzer-Füsilier Regiment. The 297th Army Flak Battalion had only joined the division in 1943 and the Panzergrenadier Regiment had been called Schützen Regiment until July 1942.

HQ

- Divisional Staff
- Mapping Detachment (mot)
- Military Police Detachment (mot)
- Escort Company

39th Panzer Regiment

- Regimental Staff
- 2 x Battalion
- Panzer Maintenance Company

40th Panzergrenadier Regiment

- Regimental Staff
- 3 x Battalion
- Pioneer Company (mot)
- Infantry Support Gun Company (self-propelled)
- 63rd Panzergrenadier Regiment.

27th Panzerjäger Battalion

- Battalion Staff
- Panzerjäger Battalion Staff Company
- 2 x Sturmgeschütz Company
- Panzerjäger Company (mot)
- Panzerjäger Supply Column (mot)

27th Panzer Reconnaissance Battalion

- Battalion Staff
- Battalion Staff Company
- Luchs Reconnaissance Company
- 2 x Reconnaissance Company (half-track)
- Heavy Reconnaissance Company (half-track)
- Reconnaissance Supply Company (mot)

27th Panzer Artillery Regiment

- Regimental Staff & Staff Battery
- Battalion (self-propelled)
- 2 x Battalion (mot)

297th Army Flak Battalion

- Battalion Staff & Staff Battery
- 2 x Heavy Flak Battery (mot)
- Light Flak Battery (mot)

27th Panzer Signals Battalion

- Signals Battalion Staff
- Panzer Telephone Company
- Panzer Radio Company
- Signals Supply Company (mot)

27th Panzer Pioneer Battalion

- Battalion Staff (half-track)
- 2 x Pioneer Company (mot)
- Pioneer Company (half-track)
- Support & Supply Units
