= Karl-Friedrich von der Meden =

WW2 German army general (1896-1961)

- Born: 3 December 1896; Samplawa, German Empire
- Died: 26 December 1961 (aged 65); Hannover, West Germany
- Military career
- Allegiance: German Empire (to 1918); Weimar Republic (to 1933); Nazi Germany
- Branch: Army (Wehrmacht)
- Service years: 1914–1919; 1922–1945
- Rank: Generalleutnant
- Commands: 17th Panzer Division
- Conflicts: World War I World War II: Invasion of Poland; Battle of France; Operation Barbarossa; Siege of Leningrad; Demyansk Pocket; Lower Dnieper Offensive; Dnieper–Carpathian Offensive; Battle of the Korsun-Cherkassy Pocket; Kamenets-Podolsky pocket; Lvov–Sandomierz Offensive
- Awards: Knight's Cross of the Iron Cross

Karl-Friedrich von der Meden (Note: According to Scherzer name is Carl-Friedrich von der Meden.) (3 December 1896 – 26 December 1961) was a general in the Wehrmacht of Nazi Germany during World War II. He was a recipient of the Knight's Cross of the Iron Cross.

== Awards and decorations ==
- Knight's Cross of the Iron Cross on 8 August 1941 as Oberstleutnant and commander of Radfahr-Abteilung 12

== Notes ==
Military offices
Preceded by Generalleutnant Walter Schilling	Commander of 17. Panzer Division; 21 July 1943 – 20 September 1944	Succeeded by Generalmajor Rudolf Demme
Preceded by Generalleutnant Friedrich-Wilhelm von Loeper	Commander of 178. Panzer Division; 1 October 1944 – 9 October 1944	Succeeded by Generalmajor Hans-Ulrich Back
Preceded by Generalmajor Hans-Ulrich Back	Commander of 178. Panzer Division; 1 January 1945 – 6 February 1945	Succeeded by Unknown
