= Karl Wahl =

German Nazi, Gauleiter of Swabia, SS-Obergruppenführer (1892–1981)

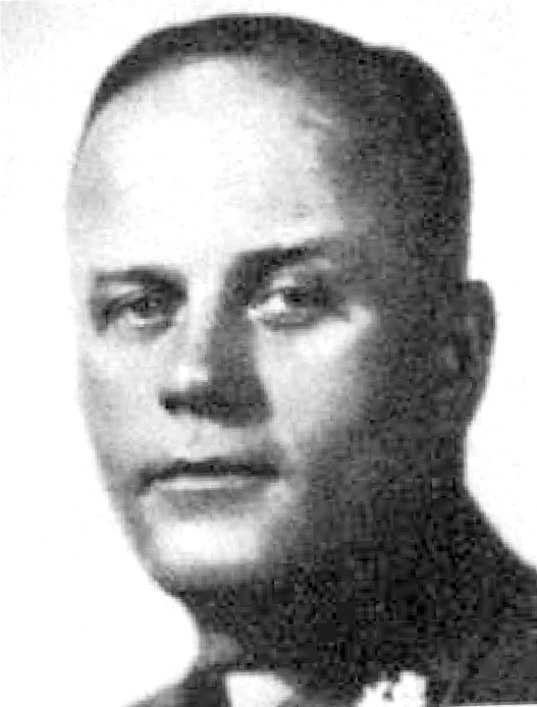

Gauleiter of Gau Swabia
- In office 1 October 1928 – 8 May 1945
- Preceded by: Position created
- Succeeded by: Position abolished

Regierungspräsident (Head of government) of Swabia
- In office 10 April 1934 – 8 May 1945

Member of the German Reichstag
- In office 12 November 1933 – 8 May 1945

Member of the Bavarian Landtag
- In office 20 May 1928 – 14 October 1933

Personal details
- Born: Mathäus Karl Wahl; 24 September 1892 Aalen, Kingdom of Württemberg, German Empire
- Died: 18 February 1981 (aged 88) Augsburg, Bavaria, West Germany
- Party: Nazi Party
- Other political affiliations: Völkisch-Social Bloc
- Occupation: Soldier (Combat Medic)

Military service
- Allegiance: German Empire
- Branch/service: Imperial German Army
- Years of service: 1910–1921
- Rank: Vizefeldwebel
- Unit: 2nd Royal Bavarian Jäger Battalion; 5th Royal Bavarian Field Artillery Regiment; 6th Royal Bavarian Landwehr Field Artillery Regiment
- Battles/wars: World War I
- Awards: Iron Cross, 1st class and 2nd class

Karl Wahl (24 September 1892 – 18 February 1981) was a German politician who served as the Nazi Gauleiter of Gau Swabia from the Gau inception in 1928 until the collapse of Nazi Germany in 1945. After the war, Wahl spent 3 1/2 years in jail before being released in 1949. In 1954, he became the first former Gauleiter to publish his autobiography.

== Life ==
=== Early life ===
Karl Wahl was born as the thirteenth child of a boilerman in Aalen, then in the Kingdom of Württemberg, in 1892. He attended volksschule and vocational school in Aalen, training as a hairdresser and passing his journeyman examinations in 1910. Upon finishing his schooling, he wished to join the Kaiserliche Marine but his father would not allow him to. Instead, Wahl entered the Bavarian Army in Aschaffenburg in 1910, signing on as a volunteer for two years. He was assigned to the 2nd Royal Bavarian Jäger Battalion, and later transferred to the medical corps.

Wahl served in the First World War on the western front as a Sanitäter (combat medic) with the 5th Royal Bavarian Field Artillery Regiment and was seriously wounded with grenade fragments to the knee on 12 October 1914, being hospitalized until March 1915. Returning to front line duty with the 6th Royal Bavarian Landwehr Field Artillery Regiment in July, he was again hospitalized with grenade and bullet wounds from May to July 1917. He was promoted to Vizefeldwebel for bravery in the face of the enemy and was decorated with the Iron Cross, 1st and 2nd class. Hospitalized with influenza at the end of the war, he returned to Germany and remained in the military, posted in Augsburg, until being discharged in November 1921. Settling in Augsburg, he completed his education at a Volkshochschule and entered the civil service, working as an assistant to the director of the city slaughterhouse until 1927. He then became a legal assistant to the Magistrate of the city until 1933.

=== Nazi Party career ===
Wahl first joined the Nazi Party and the SA (Storm troopers) in 1921. When the Party was banned in the wake of the Beer Hall Putsch, Wahl joined the Völkisch-Social Bloc, another right-wing group closely aligned with the Nazis. When the ban on the Nazi Party was lifted, Wahl immediately rejoined it on 26 February 1925 (membership number 9,803). He became the Führer of the SA Standarte in Augsburg in September of that year, retaining this command through September 1928. In October 1925, he was made the Ortsgruppenleiter (Local Group Leader) in Augsburg, a post he would retain until 30 September 1929. By 1926, he had advanced to also take on the post of Bezirksleiter (District Leader). On 20 May 1928, Wahl was elected to the Bavarian Landtag, the state parliament, a seat he held until 14 October 1933.

Vehicle insignia for a Gauleiter

On 1 October 1928, Adolf Hitler appointed Wahl Gauleiter of Gau Swabia. Wahl was the only holder of this position, staying in office until the end of the Second World War in Europe in May 1945, when the Gaue were abolished. Originally, the office of Gauleiter was purely a Party office, but with the Nazi Machtergreifung in January 1933, the position became much more an administrative one and by 1934, the Bavarian Gauleiters had supplanted the still existing office of Minister President of Bavaria as the leading administrative authorities in the state. The Gauleiter was directly appointed by Hitler and only answerable to him. In practice, Hitler interfered little in the affairs of the local leaders and their power was almost absolute.

Wahl established the first Nazi-owned newspaper in Augsburg in February 1931, the Neuen National-Zeitung Augsburg, which engaged in hate propaganda against Jews, the workers' movement and the political opposition. The newspaper, under his leadership, also called for a boycott of Jewish businesses as early as 1931.

On 12 November 1933, Wahl was elected to the Reichstag from electoral constituency 24, Upper Bavaria-Swabia. He would retain this seat until the end of the Nazi regime. Additionally, Wahl was appointed to the office of Acting Regierungspräsident (District President) of Swabia on 10 April 1934 (made permanent on 1 July 1934). He thus united under his control the highest party and governmental offices in his jurisdiction. He was made a member of the Academy for German Law on 9 September 1935.

Swabia was a relatively small Gau, and Wahl had to fend off an attempt in June 1934 by his more powerful neighbor, Adolf Wagner, Gauleiter of Gau Munich-Upper Bavaria, to incorporate Swabia into his jurisdiction. Unlike Wagner, who was a personal friend of Hitler, Wahl wielded no real influence with the party leadership. However, Wahl strenuously opposed this power grab and demanded that the plan receive Hitler’s countersignature. When confronted, Hitler agreed to allow Wahl to continue in office. Wahl was the only one of the Bavarian Gauleiter not to have graduated from university.

Wahl joined the SS with the rank of honorary SS-Gruppenführer on 9 September 1934 and was assigned to SS-Oberabschnitt-Süd (Senior District-South) in Munich until 1 April 1936 when he was reassigned to the staff of Reichsführer-SS Heinrich Himmler.

In his time as Gauleiter, Wahl, raised a Protestant but married to a Roman Catholic, enjoyed good relations with the church, something not appreciated within the higher party ranks, especially by Himmler and Martin Bormann. He nevertheless held a close friendship to Auxiliary Bishop Franz Xaver Eberle (1874-1951) of Augsburg throughout the time of the Third Reich and Hitler himself complimented Wahl in 1937, saying "Wahl, your auxiliary bishop is the most sympathetic priest that I have ever met".

On 12 July 1938, Wahl presided over the annexation of Jungholz and the Kleinwalsertal to the Gau Schwaben. Both communities had previously been part of Austria but could only be reached overland from Swabia. Both were returned to Austria in September 1945.

On 17 February 1939, Wahl was placed in charge of all municipal construction measures in Augsburg. Shortly after the launching of the Second World War, Wahl on 22 September 1939 was named to the Defense Committee for Wehrkreis VII. Wahl noticed that the excitement within the German population for another war was very limited. Compared to the patriotism he encountered and felt himself in 1914, he now mostly felt people were resigned and stunned in the face of another conflict.

In May 1941, he gave a rather telling speech at the Messerschmitt factory, voicing his belief in Hitler and his mission from God to punish all people and countries which have strayed from the path of decency. He denounced the leaders of many of the countries Germany had defeated as cowards, due to the fact that they fled to England and elsewhere rather than stayed or died with their people and soldiers. A short recording of part of this speech has been preserved.

During the war, Wahl displayed great concern for troops from his Gau. He founded and published a magazine named Front und Heimat (Front and Homefront) intended for soldiers from Swabia. He visited Swabian troops in France and also spent six weeks with a Swabian mountain division (German: Gebirgsjäger) in the Donetsk region on the eastern front in 1941. On 16 November 1942, when the jurisdiction for the Reich Defense Commissioners was changed from the Wehrkreis to the Gau level, Wahl was named Reich Defense Commissioner for Gau Swabia. In an effort to shore up the defenses of Swabia, on 17 July 1943 Wahl announced his intention to form the Heimatschutztruppe (Homeland Defense Troop). He had not sought the approval of the Party or SS hierarchy, and the idea was immediately quashed by Reichsfuhrer-SS Himmler. Wahl was promoted to SS-Obergruppenführer on 1 August 1944, and on 25 September 1944 he became the leader of Swabia's Volkssturm forces, ironically, a home defense force similar to what he had proposed the previous year.

Wahl met Hitler for the last time on 25 February 1945 in Berlin. Wahl was well aware by then that the war was lost. Hitler issued on this occasion in front of a large number of Gauleiter the statement that "the German people did not have the inner strength they were perceived to have" and therefore were losing the war. Wahl attributed this harsh statement to the stress the Führer was in and perceived him to be mortally ill. Nevertheless, he could not understand why Hitler continued the war.

With the worsening war situation in April 1945, Wahl was subordinated militarily to Paul Giesler, the Gauleiter of neighboring Gau Munich-Upper Bavaria who now was also placed in charge of Swabia and three Austrian Gaue as “Reich Defense Commissioner South.” In the last days of the war, unlike many of his fellow Gauleiters, Wahl did not flee or commit suicide. Instead, he remained in his capital city and made no effort to prevent the handover of Augsburg to the Allies on 28 April 1945, knowing full well that the city could not be defended. He was arrested by the occupying troops on 10 May 1945.

=== Post-war life ===
Wahl was subsequently held in 13 different internment camps and prisons over the next few years, including Dachau and appeared as a witness at the Nuremberg trials in 1946.

Gauleiter of Swabia for almost 17 years, Wahl underwent denazification proceedings and was sentenced on 17 December 1948 to 3½ years in prison and forfeiture of all personal funds. Credited with the 40 months of time served in captivity from April 1945 to September 1948, he was subsequently hospitalized for a time in Garmisch and finally released from confinement on 23 September 1949. The majority of his personal funds were later restored to him, losing only 10%. Originally placed in Category I (Major Offender) on appeal he was downgraded to Category II (Activist) which explains the refund of part of his funds.

After release from confinement, he became a textile merchant. After receiving permission from the denazification authorities, he wrote his autobiography in 1952 and 1953, which was published in Augsburg in 1954. In his book he stated his continuing admiration for Hitler but also his suspicion that Hitler may have realised himself by mid-1944 that Germany had lost the war. Wahl's autobiography was the first of any Gauleiter to be published.

He later worked as the library director of the Messerschmitt factory from 1958 to 1968, thanks to his friendship with Willy Messerschmitt, established in the Nazi era.

His grave in Augsburg-Göggingen, where he is buried together with his wife, carries the message: "Do not tire of doing good deeds" (German: Werdet nicht müde das Gute zu tun).

== Nazi crimes and the Holocaust ==
In his book, Wahl claimed, like many Germans and even Nazis, not to have known about the Holocaust. He states that he was approached by soldiers of the Wehrmacht, returning on front leave to Swabia, who told him of the extermination of Jewish people in Eastern Europe. Wahl further says, he contacted a personal friend at the Reich Security Main Office (RSHA) to enquire whether there was any substance to the rumour and was told it was a lie. He was asked to disclose the names of the soldiers who had approached him.

Wahl's own statement after the war was that "nobody could be found in Swabia who had personally been harmed by him", but makes no reference to the last 500 Jewish citizens of Augsburg, who disappeared in Nazi concentration camps in the years following the Kristallnacht, when the Augsburg Synagogue was destroyed.

In The End, Ian Kershaw describes him as "one of the less extreme of the Gauleiter" who in spite of his seniority (via early party membership) "did not stand high in the esteem of Hitler and Bormann" and contrasts Wahl's relative apathy towards the regime's exhortations to fight to the last man with the well-documented fanaticism and cruelty of several other Gauleiters. Kershaw points out, however, that Wahl did advocate to Bormann the use of kamikaze-like suicide attacks with bomb-laden aircraft on US supply bridges over the Rhine. Kershaw posits that Wahl could have made such a suggestion as a means of affirming loyalty to the regime in its final months, when reprisals against defeatist sentiment were at their height.

== Offices and memberships ==
Apart from being Gauleiter of Swabia, Wahl also held the following offices and memberships within the Nazi organisation:

- Regierungspräsident (Head of Government) of Swabia, since 1934
- Reichsverteidigungskommissar (Defence commissioner) of Swabia, 1942 to 1945
- SS-Obergruppenführer, promoted 1 August 1944
- Member of the German Reichstag for Upper Bavaria-Swabia from 12 November 1933 to 8 May 1945
- Member of the Bavarian Landtag 20 May 1928 to 12 November 1933
- NSDAP-membership number: 9,803
- SS-membership number: 228,017

== Decorations ==
- Iron Cross of 1914, 1st class
- Iron Cross of 1914, 2nd class
- Honour Cross of the World War 1914/1918
- State medal (Landesorden)
- Golden Party Badge (Goldenes Parteiabzeichen)
- Nazi Party Long Service Award (NSDAP-Dienstauszeichnung) in Gold
- Sword of honour of the Reichsführer-SS (Ehrendegen des Reichsführers SS)
- SS Honour Ring (Totenkopfring der SS)

== Autobiography ==
Wahl published an autobiography in Augsburg in 1954, being the first former Gauleiter to do so after the war:

- "... es ist das deutsche Herz", Erlebnisse und Erkenntnisse eines ehemaligen Gauleiters ("...it's the German heart", experiences and insights of a former Gauleiter)

He also later published a second book in Offenbach am Main in 1973:

- Patrioten oder Verbrecher – Aus Liebe zu Deutschland: 17 Jahre als Hitlers Gauleiter (Patriot or criminal - for the love of Germany: 17 years as Hitler's Gauleiter), publisher: Orion-Heimreiter-Verlag, ISBN 3-87588-070-6

== See also ==
- List SS-Obergruppenführer
