= Hans Traut =

German general

- Born: 25 January 1895
- Died: 9 December 1974 (aged 79)
- Military career
- Allegiance: Nazi Germany
- Branch: Army
- Rank: Generalleutnant
- Commands: 10th Infantry Division; 263rd Infantry Division; 78th Sturm Division
- Conflicts: World War II
- Awards: Knight's Cross of the Iron Cross with Oak Leaves

Hans Traut (25 January 1895 – 9 December 1974) was a German general during World War II. He was a recipient of the Knight's Cross of the Iron Cross with Oak Leaves of Nazi Germany.

Traut surrendered to the Red Army troops in the course of the Soviet 1944 Vitebsk–Orsha Offensive. In 1947 he was convicted as a war criminal in the Soviet Union and sentenced to 25 years of forced labor. Traut was released in 1955.

== Awards and decorations ==
- Iron Cross (1914) 2nd Class (21 October 1914) & 1st Class (17 January 1917)
- Clasp to the Iron Cross (1939) 2nd Class (20 September 1939) & 1st Class (4 October 1939)
- Knight's Cross of the Iron Cross with Oak Leaves
  - Knight's Cross on 5 August 1940 as Oberstleutnant and commander of I./Infanterie-Regiment 90
  - Oak Leaves on 23 January 1942 as Oberst and commander of Infanterie-Regiment 41 (mot.) and leader of 10th Infantry Division
- German Cross in Gold on 15 December 1943 as Generalleutnant and commander of the 78th Sturm Division

Military offices
Preceded by Generalleutnant Friedrich-Wilhelm von Loeper	Commander of 10th Infantry Division; 15 April 1942 – 25 April 1942	Succeeded by Generalleutnant August Schmidt
Preceded by Generalleutnant Ernst Häckel	Commander of 263rd Infantry Division; 24 April 1942 – 1 April 1943	Succeeded by Generalleutnant Werner Richter
Preceded by General der Infanterie Paul Völckers	Commander of 78th Sturm Division; 1 April 1943 – 31 October 1943	Succeeded by Generalleutnant Heribert von Larisch
Preceded by General der Infanterie Siegfried Rasp	Commander of 78th Sturm Division; 5 February 1944 – 12 July 1944	Succeeded by General der Infanterie Siegfried Rasp
