= Rudolf Demme =

German general (1894–1975)

Rudolf August Demme
- Born: 3 June 1894; Mühlhausen, Thuringia, German Empire
- Died: 5 January 1975 (aged 80); Meckenheim-Merl, West Germany
- Military career
- Allegiance: German Empire (to 1918); Weimar Republic (to 1933); Nazi Germany (to 1945)
- Branch: Army
- Service years: 1914–1945
- Rank: Generalmajor
- Commands: 17. Panzer Division
- Conflicts: World War I Spanish Civil War World War II
- Awards: Knight's Cross of the Iron Cross with Oak Leaves

Rudolf August Demme (3 June 1894 – 5 January 1975) was a German General during World War II. He was also a recipient of the Knight's Cross of the Iron Cross with Oak Leaves, awarded by Nazi Germany for successful military leadership.

== Biography ==
Demme joined the army reserve on 15 September 1914 as a volunteer, serving in World War I as a combat engineer, retiring from active service in December 1918.

Some 18 years later, on 5 January 1937, Demme reactivated in Reserve Service of the reincarnated German Army but he became an active officer on 1 November 1941 in the rank of the Oberstleutnant. From 27 January 1937 to 1 January 1939, after the infantry training course with the Instruction Infantry regiment Döberitz, he was a Head Trainer for the Condor Legion in Spain. At the same time, as an experienced pioneer officer, he was detached to Selection course with the 43rd Pioneer Battalion. From 1 January – 8 June 1939 he served as an Officer with Special Duties of OKW – Service with the Chief of OKW, Special-Staff W.

In the dawn of World War II Demme was transferred to the Staff of Training Leader Aachen 1 (8 June – 26 August 1939) and then to the Staff of the Commander of Fortifications at the Lower Rhine until 10 April 1940. In following years Rudolf Demme was a commanding officer in 208th Pioneer Replacement Battalion (10 April 1940 – 8 July 1941), 92nd Panzer Pioneer Battalion (8 July – 15 December 1941) and 58th Panzer Pioneer Battalion (15 December 1941 – 15 October 1942), then he was transferred to Revitalization Staff Centre.

On 10 January 1943 Demme became a Commander of the 59th Panzer-Grenadier-Regiment of the 20th Panzer Division and led his unit through the bloody battles on the Eastern Front until 25 July 1944 (Orel, Brjansk, Mogilew, Witebsk, Newel, Bobruisk, Cholm). He was promoted to Oberst on 1 July 1944. From 25 July – 20 September 1944 he was in the Führerreserve and, at the same time, he was detached to the 14th Division Leaders Course, after which he was delegated with the Leadership of the 17th Panzer Division.

In the Führerreserve OKH from 2 December 1944 and just a few days later he was delegated with the Leadership of the 132nd Infantry Division (10 December 1944 - 1 March 1945). Demme became a Generalmajor and the Commander of the 132nd Infantry Division on the same day, 1 March 1945, and led his division through the Courland Pocket until the end of the war.

Demme was captured by the Soviets on 8 May and he spent the next 10 years in Soviet captivity from which he was released on 6 October 1955. He died in Meckenheim-Merl.

== Decorations & Awards ==
- Iron Cross (1914)
  - 2nd Class (1 September 1916)
  - 1st Class
- Clasp to the Iron Cross (1939)
  - 2nd Class (2 September 1941)
  - 1st Class (20 September 1941)
- General Assault Badge (15 August 1942)
- Eastern Front Medal (15 August 1942)
- German Cross in Gold on 20 September 1942 as Oberstleutnant in the 92nd Panzer Pioneer Battalion.
- Knight's Cross of the Iron Cross with Oak Leaves
  - Knight's Cross on 14 August 1943 as Oberst and commander of the 59th Panzer Grenadier Regiment.
  - 537th Oak Leaves on 28 July 1944 as Oberst commander of the 59th Panzer Grenadier Regiment.
- One Tank Destruction Badge in Silver (15 August 1942)
- Wound Badge in Gold (15 August 1944)

Military offices
Preceded by Generalleutnant Karl-Friedrich von der Meden	Commander of 17th Panzer Division; 20 September 1944 – 2 December 1944	Succeeded by Oberst Albert Brux
