= Ferdinand Maria von Senger und Etterlin =

German soldier and author (1923–1987)

Ferdinand Maria Johann Fridolin von Senger und Etterlin
- Born: 8 June 1923; Tübingen, Germany
- Died: 10 January 1987 (aged 63); Ühlingen, West Germany
- Relatives: Fridolin von Senger und Etterlin
- Military career
- Allegiance: Nazi Germany; West Germany
- Rank: General
- Unit: 24th Panzer Division; OKH
- Commands: I Army Corps; Joint Force Command Brunssum
- Conflicts: World War II: Battle of Stalingrad; First Battle of Târgu Frumos; Second Battle of Târgu Frumos; First Jassy-Kishinev Offensive
- Awards: German Cross in Gold

Ferdinand Maria Johann Fridolin von Senger und Etterlin (8 June 1923 – 10 January 1987) was a soldier in the German Army in both the Wehrmacht of World War II and the postwar Bundeswehr, as well as a civilian jurist in the German Federal service. As an officer in the Bundeswehr, he rose to the rank of general, and completed his military service as commander-in-chief of NATO's Allied Forces Central Europe (AFCENT). He also authored numerous books on military-related subjects.

== Early years ==
Senger und Etterlin was born on June 8, 1923, in Tübingen, Germany, into a family rich in military tradition, with over 250 years of service to various German polities. His father, Fridolin von Senger und Etterlin, who served as a Wehrmacht officer throughout the Second World War, reached the rank of General der Panzertruppe ("General of Armoured Troops"), and began his own highly decorated military service before the First World War in service with the Reichswehr. His mother, Hilda Margarethe von Kracht, was the daughter of Prussian general Ernst Alexander von Kracht. Like most of his male forebears, he sought a military career and began it at age 17, by joining the cavalry regiment commanded by his father.

In 1946, he married Ebba von Keudell; they had four children.

== Wehrmacht 1940–1945 ==
Senger und Etterlin started his military career on 1 October 1940 in the replacement section of the 3rd Cavalry Regiment, at Göttingen, commanded at the time by his father. On 22 June 1941, Hitler launched Operation Barbarossa, the German invasion of the Soviet Union. Ferdinand fought on this front as a Lieutenant with the 24th Panzer Division in the German 6th Army, ultimately participating in the Battle of Stalingrad, one of history's bloodiest battles. He was placed in command of a panzer squadron on 23 August 1942, in the later stages of this battle. Not long before the end of the battle, he was wounded and evacuated back to Germany.

Upon his recovery and promoted to Oberleutnant, he was assigned to serve as a regimental adjutant in northern Italy with the re-constituted 24th Panzer Division. His unit being transferred back to the Eastern Front, after October 1943, he found himself again facing the Soviet Army in combat, this time at Kiev and the Dnieper Bend. Soviet offensives having pushed the German forces along with the 24th Division back to Romania, in August 1944, during the Second Battle of Jassy-Kishinev he was wounded again, this time losing his right arm, again requiring his evacuation from the front.

No longer able to serve directly in combat, at the age of 21, Senger und Etterlin was transferred to the Oberkommando des Heeres (OKH) or Army High Command and was assigned to be the personal adjutant of General der Panzertruppe Leo Geyr von Schweppenburg. While serving in this capacity, he was captured by American forces at the end of the war.

=== Wehrmacht decorations ===
- Deutsches Kreuz in Gold, September 4, 1944
- Panzervernichtungsabzeichen
- Nahkampfspange in Silver

== Civilian life 1945–1956 ==
After a short period as a prisoner of war, Senger und Etterlin was released and began to study law at the University of Göttingen, continuing later in Zürich and at the University of Oxford as a Rhodes scholar, following in his father's footsteps. In 1951, he was awarded a doctorate in law. His dissertation was entitled "The State Party: a Comparison Between the Weimar and the Bonn Constitutions." At this time, he was appointed to serve in the newly created Bundesamt für Verfassungsschutz ("Federal Office for the Protection of the Constitution").

== Bundeswehr 1956–1979 ==
His combat and OKH experiences being of great value, he was reactivated into military service with the Bundeswehr in March 1956, and was placed in a workgroup considering matters of military intelligence pertaining to the armed forces to the east (the Warsaw Pact). Following General Staff training, he filled an assignment with the G-3 (Operations) section of Panzerlehrbrigade 9 at Munsterlager, where he participated in field testing the new Leopard 1 main battle tank. His next post was to work with an Army study of nuclear tactics and planning. In 1964, he returned to Munsterlager and Panzerlehrbrigade 9 as commander of Panzerlehrbataillon 94, where he was able to receive practical experience in use of the Leopard tank. Von Senger und Etterlin became known as an expert on tanks.

=== First NATO assignment ===
After the successful conclusion of his training at the NATO Defence College in Rome, Senger und Etterlin served for two years with the planning office of the Northern Army Group (NORTHAG) in Mönchengladbach, working on the integration and coordination of Dutch, British, Belgian, and German armed forces units.

=== Promotion to General ===
After a short intermission in the Panzerbrigade 20 in Hemer from October 1969 to March 1970, he received orders to report to the Army Staff in Bonn, and was promoted to the rank of Brigadegeneral on September 30, 1970. Later, after a promotion to Generalmajor, von Senger und Etterlin took command of Defense District 5, in the vicinity of Stuttgart, where he worked in cooperation with civil authorities, state ministries and the federal defense administration. He was especially busy coordinating major allied formations with the German Army, as well as developing plans to quickly mobilize reservists.

On 1 July 1974, he returned to duty with the German field army, assuming command of the 7th Panzer Division, stationed in Unna. Here, he was particularly entrusted with development of the new Army Structure 4 initiative, after which he led his division through multiple successful exercises. In spring 1978, von Senger und Etterlin was promoted to the rank of Generalleutnant and assigned to be commanding general of the Bundeswehr's I Corps, headquartered in Münster.

=== AFCENT Commander-in-Chief ===
On October 1, 1979, Senger und Etterlin was promoted to full general and replaced the retiring General Franz-Joseph Schulze as Commander-in-Chief of Allied Forces Central Europe. The dramatic political and military events of the late 1970s led to the planning in 1980 of the "Long-Term Defense Program" and included the creation of European reserve forces. Despite these affairs, more political than military, General von Senger und Etterlin maintained regular contact with both large and small Bundeswehr units under his command, watching over their tactical training and overall preparedness for war, intervening, when necessary, to make corrections

== Later life and death ==
After four years in command of one of the most powerful military formations standing in defence of central Europe, General von Senger und Etterlin retired, honoured with the Großer Zapfenstreich on September 30, 1983.

In his long and productive career in military and political affairs, Senger und Etterlin was also responsible for many contributions to military literature. He wrote several books on military tactics and history, covering such subjects as armour, artillery, and military vehicles, making over 1,000 contributions to military magazines, primarily Soldat und Technik ("Soldier and Technology"). Among his historical works were a history of his old wartime unit, the 24th Panzer Division.

Apart from military subjects, he was interested in baroque and modern art history and classical music.

Senger died on 10 January 1987, in Ühlingen, Baden-Württemberg

== Works ==
- Die 24. Panzer-Division 1939-1945. Vormals 1. Kavallerie-Division, Nebel Verlag, ISBN 3-89555-186-4
- Die deutschen Panzer 1926 - 1945, Bernard & Graefe, ISBN 3-7637-0185-0
- Die deutschen Geschütze 1939-1945, Bernard & Graefe, ISBN 3-7637-5989-1
- Panzer der Bundeswehr und ihrer Verbündeten, Athenäum-Verlag 1958
- Soldaten zwischen Rhein und Weser, Verlag Wehr u. Wissen, ISBN 3-8033-0287-0
- Der Gegenschlag, Vowinckel-Verlag
- Die Kampfpanzer von 1916 - 1966, Bernard & Graefe, ISBN 3-7637-6221-3
- Taschenbuch der Panzer. Jg. 1. 1943 - 1954; Taschenbuch der Panzer. Jg. 2. 1943 - 1957; Taschenbuch der Panzer. Jg. 3. 1960; Taschenbuch der Panzer. Jg. 4. 1969
- Das kleine Panzerbuch, Lehmann
- Der sowjetische mittlere Kampfpanzer der Baureihe T-34 bis T-62, Lehmann
- Pionierpanzer, Bernard & Graefe, ISBN 3-7637-0575-9

Military offices
Preceded by Generalmajor Eberhard Wagemann	Commander of 7th Panzer Division (Bundeswehr); 1 July 1974 – 31 March 1978	Succeeded by Generalmajor Gottfried Greiner
