= Rudolf Sieckenius =

German Generalmajor during World War II

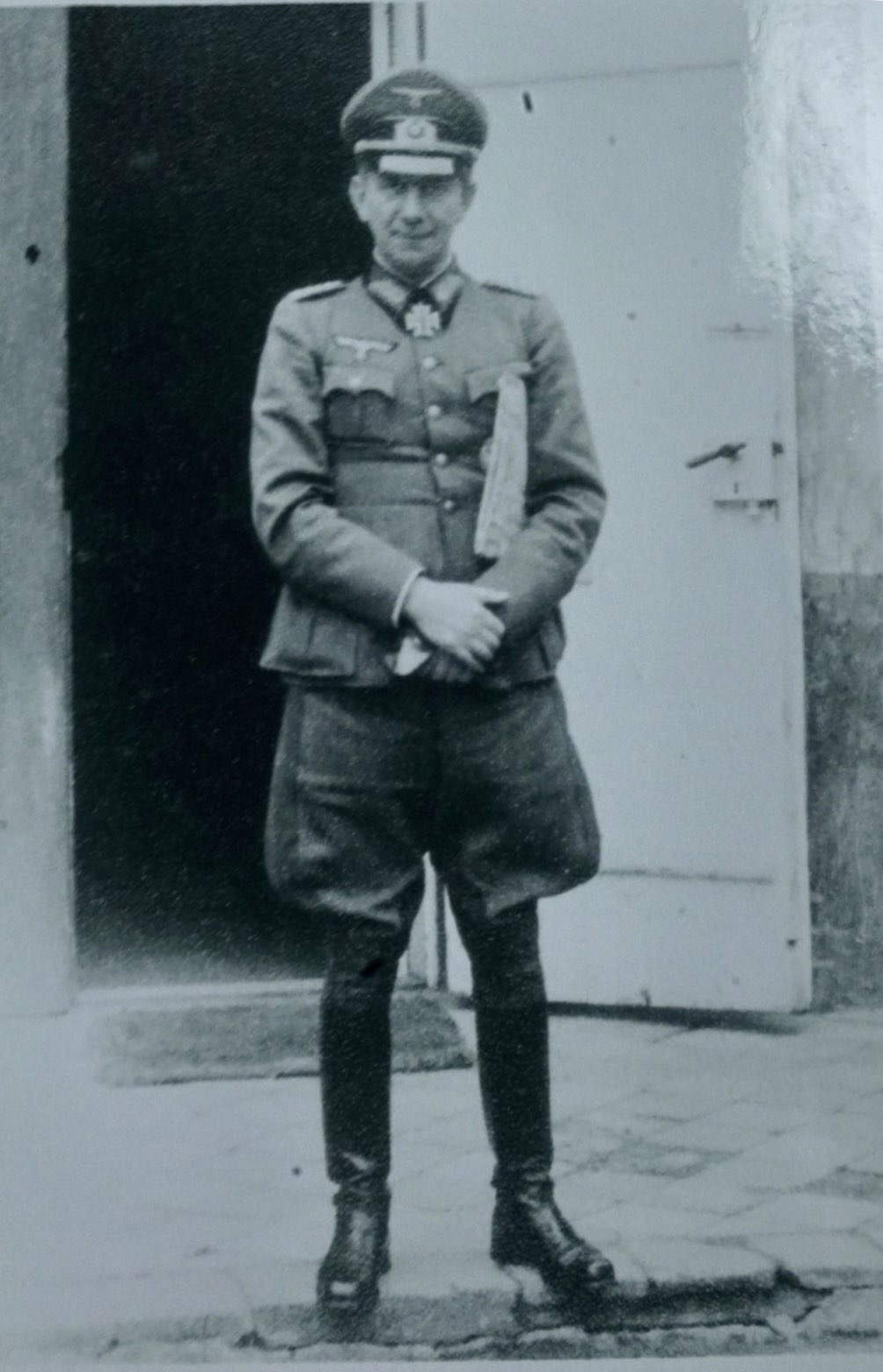
- Generalmajor Rudolf Sieckenius on 22 August 1944, Königsberg
- Born: 18 August 1896; Ludwigsthal, Province of Silesia, German Empire (now Ludvíkov, Poland)
- Died: 29 April 1945 (aged 48); Teupitz, Nazi Germany
- Military career
- Allegiance: German Empire; Weimar Republic; Nazi Germany
- Branch: Imperial German Army; Prussian Army; Landespolizei German Army
- Service years: 1914–1945
- Rank: Generalmajor
- Nicknames: Siecki, Lothar
- Commands: 2nd Panzer Regiment; 16 Panzer Division; 263 Infantry Division; 391 Sicherungs Division
- Conflicts: World War I World War II: Invasion of Poland; Battle of France; Battle of Kiev (1941); Battle of Stalingrad; Operation Avalanche; Battle of Halbe
- Awards: Knight's Cross of the Iron Cross

Rudolf Alexander Karl Wilhelm Sieckenius (18 August 1896 – 29 April 1945) was a German Generalmajor during World War II who commanded the 16 Panzer Division during Operation Avalanche (Salerno Landings) in September 1943. Despite his widely acknowledged success, which almost resulted in the Allies being pushed back into the sea, Sieckenius was made a scapegoat and sidelined until his death during the Battle of Berlin, when he commanded the 391st Wehrmacht security division.

== Early life and World War I ==
Rudolf Sieckenius was born in 1896 in Ludwigsthal, Silesia, as the second of nine siblings. His parents were Alexander Sieckenius, a businessman, and Luise Rittner, granddaughter of Saxon politician Carl August Rittner. Through maternal lineage, he was a cousin to General Heinrich von Prittwitz und Gaffron, whose grandmother, Maria Camilla Rittner, was Luise's aunt.

In 1908, possibly for religious reasons, the Sieckenius family moved from Katowice to Gnadenberg near Bunzlau. Due to investment errors, his father's business deteriorated and eventually declared bankruptcy in 1913. Despite the reported debts amounting to 340,000 Reichsmarks, Sieckenius and his brothers continued their costly Gymnasium education in Bunzlau until 1914, when the war interrupted the summer vacation. 18-year-old Sieckenius and his elder brother Otto-Heinrich joined up immediately on 22 August 1914 as Kriegsfreiwilliger, both enlisting in the Feldartillerie Regiment Nr.5, with which he served in the Russian front.

In November 1915, he was transferred as corporal to the 154th Infantry Regiment in France, serving successively as a platoon leader, company commander, and battalion adjutant. One of his comrades was Rudolf Carnap, who mentioned Sieckenius in his war diary:

Sikenius(sic) visits me and tells of the great enterprise of the previous night...he was there as leader of our assault troops....Sikenius speaks of a certain feeling that nothing could happen to him. (July 5, 1917)

After Germany's defeat, Sieckenius volunteered to join Freikorps Regiment Graf Yorck of the Upper Silesian Border Guard(Grenzschutz). He did not remain in the 100,000-man Heer but was discharged in October 1919 with the rank of Leutnant der Reserve.

== Weimar Republic years ==
On 29 April 1920, as a Leutnant Sieckenius joined the police force where he served for fourteen years in Elberfeld and Wuppertal. He initially served as adjutant to the Elberfeld police commander before being transferred to the driving unit, where his direct superior Hauptmann Christian Seelig became embroiled in a serious embezzlement scandal. For several years afterward, Sieckenius worked in administrative roles shuttling between the police headquarters of Elberfeld-Barmen-Remscheid and the Elberfeld district office, handling personnel matters.

In December 1923, his superior, Police Major Georg Hartmann, was charged with drunkenly singing "we don't need a Jewish republic" on the main street at midnight. It remains unclear how Sieckenius became entangled in this incident—local left-wing newspapers accused him of joining in the singing, though the police disciplinary files contain no reference to him.

In March 1925, during the mourning period for deceased Weimar President Ebert, Elberfeld was rocked by the infamous flag scandal when a national flag was cut down and destroyed at the Waldesruh police barracks. Sieckenius's friend, Police Oberleutnant Günther Schubert (later a Knight's Cross recipient), was considered the prime suspect. The subsequent criminal investigation was temporarily suspended due to Sieckenius's complaints against the detective, leading left-wing newspapers to repeatedly attack him as a "right-wing lieutenant" who was "extremely arrogant" and guilty of "obstructing the investigation."

Possibly in connection with this affair, Sieckenius was finally able to leave office position in summer 1925 to lead a police station (Revier Leiter). In 1929, as a police Hauptmann, he attended equestrian training in Potsdam. Upon his return, he successively commanded the mounted police units in Wuppertal and Remscheid, frequently participating in regional equestrian exhibitions and competitions.

== Return to the Wehrmacht ==
Rudolf Sieckenius did not join any political party according to his 1933 questionnaire. With the Nazi rise to power, he appears to have remained unaffected, but in 1934 he made the decision to leave the police force and join the army in Breslau, transferring as a cavalry captain. On creation of the armored troops in late 1935, he transferred into the Panzer branch and was appointed a company commander in Panzer-Regiment 2 under his cousin Heirnrich von Prittwitz und Gaffron. After a further year as Major beim Regiments-Stab (major in the regimental headquarter), he was appointed to command the first battalion of the newly-formed Panzer-Regiment 15 at Sagan.

In November 1938 Sieckenius was promoted to commander of the 66th Panzer Battalion (Panzer-Abteilung 66) based in Eisenach. Serving as his adjutant was Hans Ulrich Schroeder, later a colonel in the Bundeswehr, whose diary records provide interesting insights into Sieckenius's character.

On late February 1939, following orders from his divisional commander, General Stumme of the 2nd Light Division, Sieckenius and his adjutant conducted a two-day reconnaissance mission to the Czech border, traveling in civilian clothes. A man who appreciated good wine, Sieckenius also took the opportunity to enjoy himself at Carlton Hotel in Marienbad.

In March 1939, the division moved into Czechoslovakia as part of the German occupation. Sieckenius contracted a severe cold and sustained a high fever en route, which left him irritable and ill-tempered. Nevertheless, he refused to move to a hotel, sitting instead in a cold schoolroom and insisting he could not rest comfortably while his men still struggled through the snow.

Sieckenius and his officers were eventually billeted in Tloskau Castle, where they spent a period of friendship with the host family von Daněk-Esse. The bachelor, Sieckenius, was particularly charmed by the attractive lady of the house, Margarete, and paid her considerable gallant attention.

The friendship between the Czech family and the German officers continued over the following years. In summer 1942, when the SS moved to requisition the castle, the Daněks appealed to Sieckenius for help. Despite being engaged in fierce combat on the Don River, he immediately intervened, reaching out to Kurt Daluege.

== World War II ==
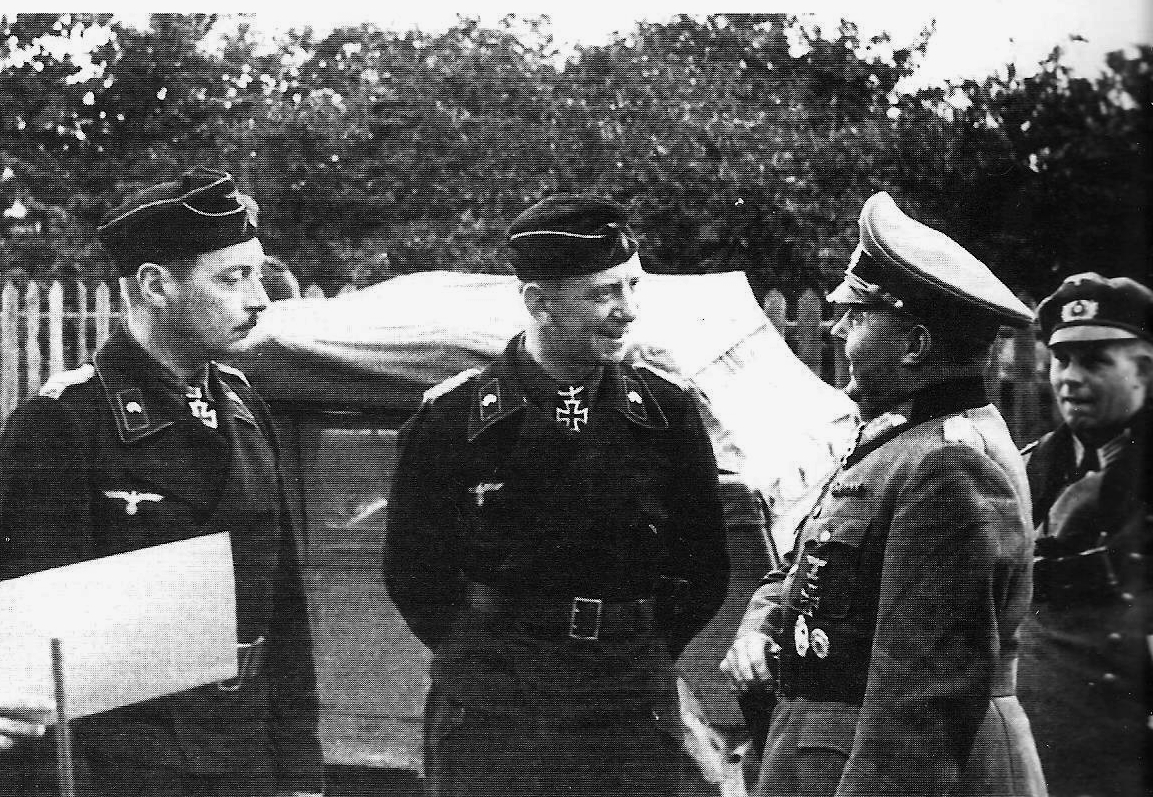
Strachwitz, Sieckenius, and Hube

At the outset of the war, Sieckenius, now Oberstleutnant (Lieutenant colonel), led Panzer-Abteilung 66 in the Polish campaign. His leadership combined genuine courage with sometimes theatrical gestures. On September 4, 1939, during the advance on Szekocziny, Sieckenius risked his own life by climbing onto a tank stuck in mud, braving machine gun fire from a panicked crewman, in order to pull the crew out.

On September 10 near Radom, after harshly rebuking an infantry battalion commander for failing to advance despite armored support, Sieckenius deliberately drove through enemy-occupied woods to shame the hesitant infantry into action. Spotting a riderless horse, he ordered it to be caught, declaring he would present it to the cautious infantry regimental commander 'to give him more mobility.' He then insisted on driving at walking pace while the horse was held alongside, despite ongoing enemy fire. His confident assessment that the woods were weakly held persuaded the divisional commander to order an advance. However, the troops met unexpectedly strong resistance, and Sieckenius later admitted his adjutant had saved his life by 'accidentally' breaking the horse's reins, allowing them to escape at speed.

On September 15, Sieckenius was awarded the first Iron Cross of the division. However, a traffic accident en route made him arrive at division HQ bleeding profusely, and he had to receive medical treatment before his medal. Later that month, General Stumme praised him to General Hoth as "the finest commander in this division," noting his steel-like composure, bravery, and exceptional leadership that "far exceeds all expectations."

In October, Sieckenius led his battalion back to Eisenach. Despite the successful Polish campaign, he expressed deep concern about the impending war, writing to his sister: "Thoughts of this new, likely even more severe war in the West occupy my mind almost day and night. At my age, one thinks differently about such things than 25 years ago. The thought of the hardships and many sacrifices it will again cost is at times utterly depressing."

Under Erwin Rommel, Sieckenius remained in command of a Panzer battalion and took part in the Battle of France. His experience was vividly accounted in his own combat report. On 18 May 1940 at Cambrai, while under heavy enemy fire, Sieckenius left protection to jump from tank to tank, reassuring and directing his men until the gunfire wounded his left leg. As his men later recorded: "Our hearts were filled with both pain at leaving our commander and pride in him."

In August 1940, a recovered Sieckenius returned to his battalion and enjoyed a period of respite in France. His battalion was said to have the best atmosphere of any unit. He granted his officers generous leave to visit Paris and even regularly hosted officer gatherings at Parisian bars. Whenever he entered, the bands would play Panzerlied - in recognition of this commander.

In May 1941, to his great delight, Sieckenius was appointed commander of his former unit, Panzer-Regiment 2, now part of 16th Panzer Division under Generalmajor Hube.

Soon after, he took part in Operation Barbarossa, the invasion of the Soviet Union in June 1941. After Battle of Uman, on August 12, the 16th Panzer Division and the 1st SS Panzer Division advanced side by side towards the Black Sea port of Nikolayev. Despite being cut off from main forces, Kampfgrupp Sieckenius (combat group) engaged in an unprecedented three-day battle against the Soviet forces, eventually capturing Nikolayev on August 16, seizing the first Black Sea port for Germany. This victory earned him the Knight's Cross, making him the second member of the regiment to receive this honor, following Graf von Strachwitz.

Sieckenius's performance on the Eastern Front won recognition from multiple superiors, including General Kempf of XLVIII Corps and General Stumme, who directed his adjutant to contact the 16th Panzer Division about advancing Sieckenius's seniority, citing his "outstanding personal qualities and exceptional performance". His division commander, General Hube, was equally impressed, declaring Sieckenius "fully qualified for future panzer division command."

On 17 December 1941 Sieckenius was promoted to Oberst, with seniority to date back from 1 February 1941.

=== Stalingrad pocket ===
In mid-May 1942, the German offensive resumed. Operation Blue (Fall Blau) aimed to capture the oil fields of the Caucasus and secure the southern flank along the Don and Volga rivers. The 16th Panzer Division participated in the southern thrust toward Stalingrad.

On 12 July, after the regiment crossed the Donets River south of Lysychansk, Sieckenius grew impatient with the slow pace of his tank columns on the sandy eastern bank. He impulsively ordered his Kübelwagen driven to the front of the column, only to strike a mine. Though he and his crew escaped, Sieckenius suffered a burst eardrum from the blast and required medical treatment for several days, with Oberstleutnant von Bassewitz temporarily assuming command of the regiment.

By the time of the Battle of Kalach in early August, the 16th Panzer Division had already destroyed 1,000 tanks on the Eastern Front, mostly credited to Sieckenius' regiment.

On 23 August, the 16th Panzer Division, spearheading the XIV Panzer Corps, launched a 60-kilometer thrust toward Stalingrad. At 4:30 a.m., Kampfgruppe Sieckenius led the advance from the Don bridgehead in a broad wedge formation. Supported by Luftwaffe ground-attack aircraft and bombers, the division drove eastward through heavily fortified Soviet positions. At 6:35 p.m., the leading tanks had reached the western bank of the Volga, north of Stalingrad - marking the first time German forces had arrived at this fateful river.

By November 1942, the situation had drastically changed. Sieckenius and his regiment found themselves trapped in the Stalingrad pocket with approximately 290,000 Axis troops. As winter set in, the situation within the pocket became increasingly desperate. In anticipation for Operation Donnerschlag, Sieckenius was placed in command of all remaining operational armored vehicles in the pocket to lead the breakout spearhead. Together with Oberst Martin Lattmann of the 14. Panzer-Division, he had conducted lengthy reconnaissance on 18 December of the planned breakout route near Karpovka. Hitler and the OKW, however, forbade the breakout attempt.

Despite the deteriorating situation, Sieckenius maintained strict discipline and high standards regardless of rank. In November, when Oberleutnant Ulrich Schwarz fell ill just after being given command of a company as a last chance to prove himself worthy of promotion, he chose to seek treatment at a rear-area hospital despite being offered a forward medical station. Sieckenius responded by blocking his promotion to Hauptmann.

On 18 January, General Hube, now commander of XIV Panzer Corps, received an unexpected evacuation order from the Don Army Group, officially to reorganize supplies for the 6th Army. Hube seized the opportunity to evacuate a few individuals, including Rudolf Sieckenius. At 9:30 a.m. on 20 January, the Don Army Group headquarters received a telegram confirming Sieckenius' arrival.

Through Hube's efforts, each division was able to select a platoon leader, company commander, and battalion commander for evacuation. For the 16th Panzer Division, Hauptmann Bernd Freytag von Loringhoven, commander of I Battalion, was selected as the battalion commander to be evacuated.

Sieckenius, however, had hoped to save more of his officers, particularly Hauptmann Manfred von Cramon, commander of II Battalion, whom he held in high regard. On 22 January 1943, Don Army Group sent another evacuation list with von Cramon's name, presumably at Sieckenius's request, but the 26-year-old never made it out.

Reflecting on the events, Freytag von Loringhoven remarked, "At times, Sieckenius could be nervous and gruff, but at heart, he was a caring superior. Stalingrad demanded terrible sacrifices from his men, and he suffered immensely because of it." When Loringhoven met his commander outside the encirclement for the first time, Sieckenius embraced him with "tears welling up in his eyes".

=== France to Salerno ===
On 5 March 1943, Sieckenius was appointed commander of the reformed 16th Panzer Division, which was being reorganized in Laval, France, after its destruction at Stalingrad. Under his diligent leadership, the division gradually took shape once more. He established his headquarters in Port Brillet, receiving visits from senior officers including Geyr von Schweppenburg, Dollmann, and Hube, all of whom expressed satisfaction with the progress. During Generaloberst Guderian's inspection, Sieckenius successfully lobbied for the assignment of a Panther tank battalion to the division.

June 1943 brought two developments for Rudolf Sieckenius: his promotion to Generalmajor and orders for the 16th Panzer Division to deploy to Tuscany, Italy. He established his headquarters at Castello di Frosini near Siena. On 9 June, General Sieckenius was formally welcomed by the Prefect of Siena, the local Gauleiter, and Italian military officials, with local children presenting flowers.

Unlike many German officers who adopted what was perceived as an arrogant attitude toward their Italian allies, Sieckenius made deliberate efforts to maintain cordial relations with local Italian authorities. The Italian officials, however, exploited this goodwill. During a luncheon, they lodged formal complaints about misconduct by German soldiers—accusations that later proved trivial. Nevertheless, the pressure compelled Sieckenius to agree to restrict his troops' access to major cities, a decision that caused discontent within the division.

Despite the pressures of command, Sieckenius demonstrated a more personal side during the division's redeployment. In early July 1943, as the 16th Panzer Division transferred from Tuscany to Apulia, Sieckenius took the opportunity to tour southern Italy with his senior staff officers. At Pompeii, they feasted on massive amounts of local oranges. In Naples, their luxury staff cars and the general became magnets for a "terrible band" of musicians. In Irsina, they visited the local church and enjoyed ice cream.

Particularly memorable was 4 July, when General Hube hosted a private seaside dinner for the Sieckenius and his staff in Formia. One staff officer later described the evening as a rare moment of respite between Stalingrad and the fate that lay ahead.

The 16th Panzer Division performed adequately in Italy for six months between June and November 1943, seeing action at Salerno, Naples and Termoli before being sent back to the Eastern Front.

According to Major Udo von Alvensleben, the divisional Intelligence Officer, it was their commanding general Traugott Herr who made Sieckenius a scapegoat for Salerno and Termoli. General Sieckenius had a leadership style that sometimes clashed with that of his opportunist superiors. On 13 September 1943, for no good reason, 10th Army commander Heinrich von Vietinghoff came to believe that the invaders were about to re-embark and sent this misinformation to Berlin, and General Herr promptly ordered the 16th Panzer Division to launch a counterattack. Only Sieckenius remained doubtful; he and his staff did not believe in the enemy's retreat. He argued that a full-scale counterattack would only lead to meaningless loss of life and ammunition, and he formally protested against Herr's directive. Nevertheless, Herr ordered the division to advance towards the coast. Initially successful, the counterattack was soon halted by devastating enemy naval fire.

In early October 1943, the Allies made a sudden landing at Termoli, drawing intense concern from Hitler. Field Marshal Kesselring ordered the 16th Panzer Division to march over 120 kilometers to retake the port at all costs. General von Vietinghoff objected this deployment and put off Kesselring's order for one day. Compounding the situation, heavy rain and inadequate petrol supplies—due to a shortsighted quartermaster—further delayed the division. The exhausted troops arrived at Termoli 24 hours later than planned, ultimately failing to repel the enemy landing.

The defeat at Termoli drew direct attention from Hitler, causing many panicked generals to hastily shift the blame onto Sieckenius, despite his relatively minor role in the failure. General Richard Heidrich, the commander of the 1st Parachute Division, criticized the 16th Panzer Division's command so strongly that an enraged Sieckenius considered legal action against him.

On 7 November 1943, Sieckenius was relieved of his command and placed in the "Reserve of Higher Commanders." He was also forced to take a training course for division commanders, which was an insult to a general who had already led a division in combat. After completing the course, he was granted a 40-day home leave to Bunzlau. However, his parents had both died in the preceding month.

=== Clash with Schörner ===
Sieckenius did not receive another formal command until 21 May 1944, when he was assigned commander of the 263rd Infantry Division under Army Group North.

In the summer of 1944, the division was badly mauled and suffered massive casualties during the heavy soviet offensive in Latvia. Faced with orders from his superiors forbidding any retreat, Sieckenius was compelled to take extreme measures. On one occasion, he held his soldiers at gunpoint, insisting that if they ran out of ammunition, they would have to fight with stones rather than fall back.

Yet, this was not enough to satisfy the Army Group Commander Ferdinand Schörner. On 9 August 1944, the tenth day of almost non-stop intense fighting, Schörner, known for his brutality and harsh disciplinary measures against his own troops, showed up at the 263rd Division HQ. He harshly demanded that Sieckenius push his exhausted soldiers to hold their positions for once.

Sieckenius pointed out that the division had always fulfilled its duty, yet the soldiers's strength was waning. He emphasized the urgent need of soldiers for an hour's rest, stating that mere encouragement was no longer effective. Schörner, unmoved by this protest, immediately relieved him of his command.

In September 1944, Generalmajor Sieckenius was reassigned as commander of the rear-area 391.Sicherungs-Division, which was then engaged in constructing defences near Warsaw. It marked a considerable demotion for a former Panzer-Division commander.

=== Final Days ===
From November 1944 to January 1945 the 391st Division under Sieckenius was on anti-partisan duty in the Lowicz area and built up the Bzura-Rawka position. This was followed by repelling the Russian offensive from the Baranow bridgehead and retreating via Kolo, Wreschen and Posen to Lissa and from there to the Oder Front.

In late April, the 391st Division, part of the Ninth Army, found itself hopelessly surrounded in the Halbe Pocket near Berlin. Amidst the chaos, where organization and command had utterly collapsed, Generalmajor Sieckenius "once again showed himself to everyone as the exemplary, brave commander". On April 29, 1945, when Army Commander General Theodor Busse had already fled with heavy Panzers to save his own skin, Sieckenius stayed with his men and organized the remaining armoured cars and troops for a break out. They managed to break through Halbe and advance into the forests south of Lake Teupitz, where they encountered an ambush by Soviet tanks and anti-tank guns.

One of his officers recounted the events in a post-war letter:

Towards the evening of a Sunday (29 April 1945 was Sunday), I can no longer recall the exact date, General Sikenius(sic) and General von Roden organized all the units in and around Halbe to a breakout attempt...After marching for about two hours, the spearhead was attacked by some Russian tanks which fiercely resisted. In the midst of fighting, General Sikenius left his SPW and personally attack the enemy tank with a Panzerfaust in the forest.

He then suffered a severe abdominal wound and, as a staff officer who had remained with him witnessed, chose to take his own life. This occurred in the early hours of April 30.

We felt we were safe and proceeded north along the road (south of Lake Teupitz, west of the Autobahn) into the forest. Suddenly, we encountered tanks and anti-tank guns awaiting. We were caught in intense fire and had to jumped out. Your brother jumped to the right onto a forest clearing, while I went left. More insane enemy fire. I was wounded again and rolled away. Suddenly I heard your brother calling my name. I crawled towards him. Still a few steps away, I saw him shoot himself in the head with his pistol. He had a serious stomach injury. I tried to recover some of his belongings, but intense fire resumed in that area. Then the Russians attacked and we had to retreat. Believe me, there was nothing more that could be done.[...]

He had always said, 'If I get wounded, I will shoot myself.' He left the question of falling into captivity without injury unanswered.

May I also tell you that I feel he foresaw his end? He did not want to start over; he said so himself in his final days. He knew he was already at his peak.

Later, while in a POW camp, this staff officer heard that local villagers had buried a general, who must be Sieckenius. He was laid to rest in a mass grave at today's Kriegsgräberstätte Teupitz.

== Personal life ==
Sieckenius never married and was survived by two brothers and four sisters. Brazilian computational linguist Clarisse Sieckenius de Souza is his grand-niece.

He was known as 'Lothar' to his family, and 'Siecki' to those close to him.

Though a lifelong bachelor, Sieckenius clearly made a favorable impression on the women he encountered. Following the French campaign in 1940, he was quartered at Château de Béhoust outside Paris, home to Madame Suzanne Villenave, a prominent horse breeder. Their shared love of riding developed into a friendship, and she honored him by naming a newborn filly "Siecki." The horse later went on to compete regularly on French racetracks.

During the war's final phase in 1945, his Division HQ was situated on an estate in Bremsdorf, presumably the Bremsdorfer Mühle. Here too he left a lasting impression on his hostess, who wrote to his sister Annemarie after his death:

With several conversations, I came to appreciate your brother. He was an honest, reliable, and fair man with a remarkably gentle chivalry—a pleasant surprise after hosting the SS for six months. He borrowed books from my bookshelf, and through his reading, I learned more about him. My children and I developed a genuine fondness for this very reserved man."

He once owned a mini dachshund, a tiny female, yet he called her 'Löwe (Lion).'

== Awards ==
- Eastern Medal
- Wound Badge in Silver
- Knight's Cross of the Iron Cross on 17 September 1941 as Oberstleutnant and commander of Panzer-Regiment 2

Military offices
Preceded by Oberst Hero Breusing	Kommandeur of 2 Panzer Regiment (Pz Reg 2); 1 May 1941 – January, 1943	Succeeded by Oberst Arthur von Holtey
Preceded by Generalleutnant Günther Angern	Kommandeur of 16 Panzer Division; March 1943 – 7 November 1943	Succeeded by Generalmajor Hans-Ulrich Back
Preceded by Generalleutnant Werner Richter	Kommandeur of 263rd Infantry Division; 21 May 1944 - 10 August 1944	Succeeded by Generalleutnant Alfred Hemmann
Preceded by Generalleutnant Albrecht Baron Digeon von Monteton	Kommandeur of 391.Sicherungs-Division; September 1944 - 30 April 1945	Succeeded by
