= Walter Schilling =

German General and Knight's Cross recipient (1895–1943)

Walter Curt Gustav Schilling
- Born: 23 December 1895; Kulm, West Prussia (Present day Poland)
- Died: 20 July 1943 (aged 47) near Izium, Soviet Union
- Military career
- Allegiance: German Empire (to 1918); Weimar Republic (to 1933); Nazi Germany
- Branch: Army (Wehrmacht)
- Service years: 1914–1943
- Rank: Generalleutnant
- Commands: 17th Panzer Division
- Conflicts: World War I World War II: Invasion of Poland; Battle of France; Operation Barbarossa; Battle of Białystok–Minsk; Battle of Smolensk (1941); Battle of Kiev (1941); Battle of Moscow; Battle of the Caucasus
- Awards: Knight's Cross of the Iron Cross

Walter Curt Gustav Schilling (23 December 1895 – 20 July 1943) was a German general during World War II who commanded the 17th Panzer Division. He was killed on 20 July 1943 near Izium. On 28 July 1943, Schilling was posthumously awarded the Knight's Cross of the Iron Cross.

== Awards and decorations ==
- Iron Cross (1914) 2nd and 1st Class
- Iron Cross (1939) 2nd and 1st Class
- German Cross in Gold (28 February 1942)
- Knight's Cross of the Iron Cross on 28 July 1943 as Generalleutnant and commander of 17. Panzer-Division

Military offices
Preceded by General der Panzertruppe Fridolin von Senger und Etterlin	Commander of 17. Panzer-Division; 16 June 1943 – 20 July 1943	Succeeded by Generalleutnant Karl-Friedrich von der Meden
