= Fridolin von Senger und Etterlin =

German general

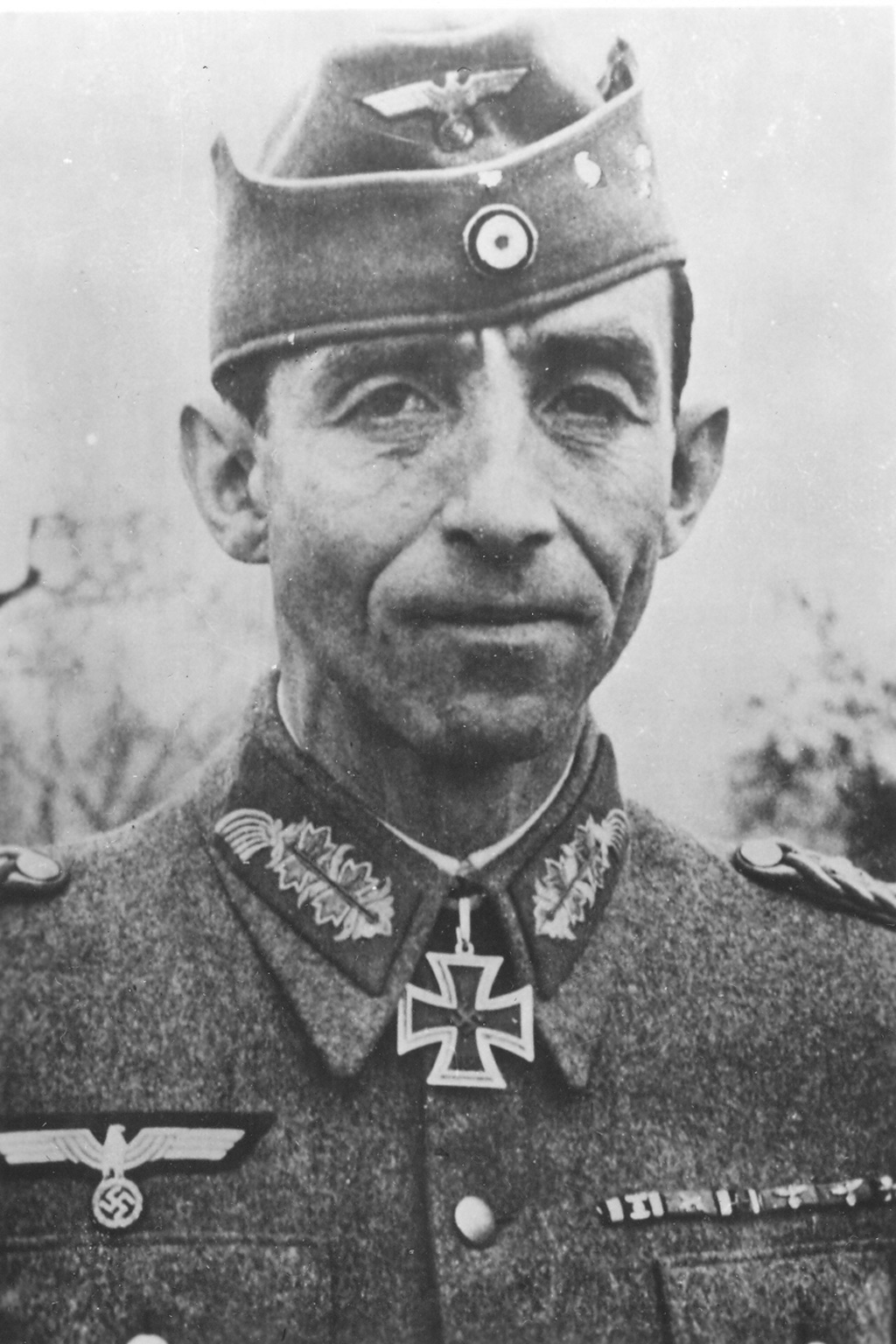
- Born: 4 September 1891; Waldshut, Grand Duchy of Baden, German Empire
- Died: 9 January 1963 (aged 71); Freiburg-im-Breisgau, Baden-Württemberg, West Germany
- Relatives: Ferdinand Maria von Senger und Etterlin
- Military career
- Allegiance: German Empire; Weimar Republic; Nazi Germany
- Branch: German Army
- Rank: General der Panzertruppe
- Commands: 17th Panzer Division; XIV Panzer Corps
- Conflicts: World War I World War II
- Awards: Knight's Cross of the Iron Cross with Oak Leaves

Fridolin von Senger und Etterlin (4 September 1891 – 9 January 1963) was a general in the army of Nazi Germany during World War II.

== Biography ==
Fridolin Rudolph von Senger und Etterlin was born on 4 September 1891, in Waldshut near the Swiss border. In 1912, he became a Rhodes scholar at Oxford and acquired fluency in French and English. World War I interrupted his education in August 1914, and he was commissioned a lieutenant in the reserves. Senger remained in the postwar Reichswehr as a cavalry officer. Senger studied for two years at the Cavalry School in Hannover, spent four years with the cavalry inspectorate in Berlin, and by 1938 was promoted Colonel.

=== World War II ===
Senger took part in the Battle of France in 1940. In October 1942, he was given command of the 17th Panzer Division in Southern Russia. In June 1943, during the Battle of Sicily he was German Liaison Officer to the Italian 6th Army (General Alfredo Guzzoni), and commanded the German units on the island until 17 July 1943 when General Hans-Valentin Hube assumed control of all Axis troops on the island. In August 1943, Senger took command of the German forces on the islands of Sardinia and Corsica. He conducted the evacuation when the German positions became untenable. On 8 October 1943 he received the command of the XIV Panzer Corps in Italy.

During the Battle of Monte Cassino, Senger fought at the Gustav Line, which included Monte Cassino. The German position was only broken by the Allies in May 1944.

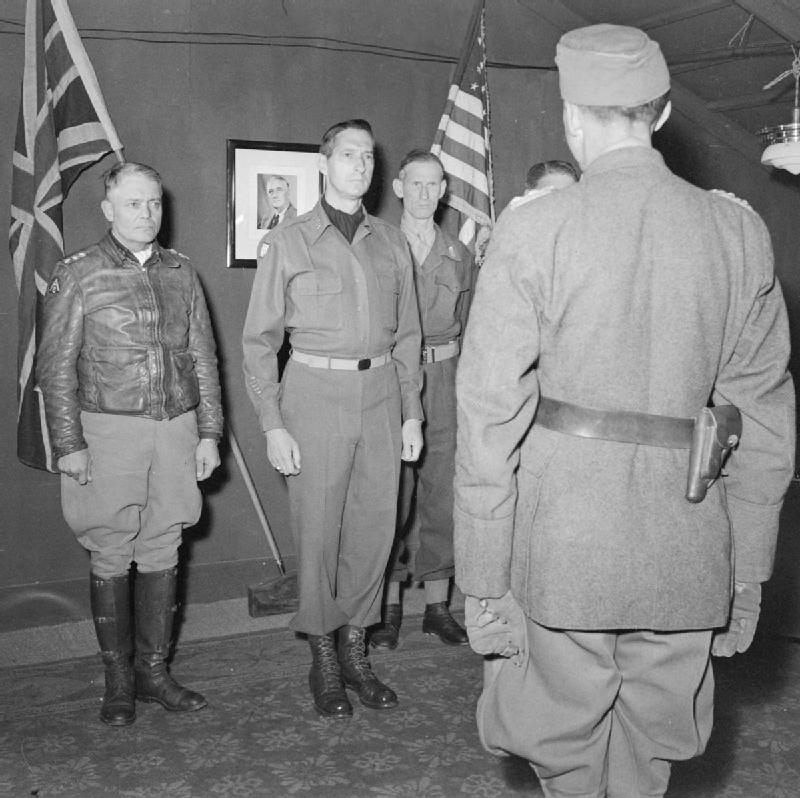
Senger at the presence of gen. Clark, with his pistol still in his holster.

When the German forces in Italy surrendered 4 May 1945, General Heinrich von Vietinghoff feared Italian partisans would attempt to kill him if he made the trip to the Allied headquarters in Florence, so he sent Senger in his place. Senger came close to being killed by partisans himself on the journey had not a group of American officers intervened. After presenting himself to General Mark W. Clark and asking for orders, he was about to depart when a reporter noticed Senger still had his pistol in his holster. Clark called him back and ordered Senger, "Get rid of that gun." Senger removed his belt and flung it at the base of a tree.

=== Later life ===
After the war he wrote his memoirs, entitled Krieg in Europa (War in Europe) (which were translated into English as Neither Fear nor Hope), and he continued to write on military matters and theory. He was invited to the Königswinter conferences by Lilo Milchsack. These annual conferences helped to heal the bad memories after the end of the Second World War. At the conference he worked with the politician Hans von Herwath, future German President Richard von Weizsäcker and other leading German decision makers as well as British politicians like Denis Healey, Richard Crossman and the journalist Robin Day.

In 1950, Senger was one of the authors of the Himmerod memorandum which addressed the issue of rearmament (Wiederbewaffnung) of the Federal Republic of Germany after World War II. Senger was introduced by B. H. Liddell Hart to the military historian Michael Howard. Howard, who had fought in Italy during the war, recalls him saying, "May I give you a word of advice? Next time you invade Italy, do not start at the bottom." He was the father of Bundeswehr General and military author Ferdinand Maria von Senger und Etterlin (1923–1987).

== Works ==
- von Senger und Etterlin, Fridolin (1963). Neither fear nor hope: the wartime career of general Frido von Senger und Etterlin, defender of Cassino. Translated from the German by George Malcolm. London: Macdonald.

== Awards ==
- German Cross in Gold on 11 October 1943 as Generalleutnant and commander of the German Wehrmacht on Corsica
- Knight's Cross of the Iron Cross with Oak Leaves
  - Knight's Cross on 8 February 1943 as Generalmajor and commander of the 17. Panzer-Division
  - Oak Leaves on 5 April 1944 as General der Panzertruppe and commanding general XIV. Panzerkorps

== Notes ==
Military offices
| Preceded by Generalleutnant Rudolf-Eduard Licht | Commander of 17th Panzer Division; 10 October 1942 – 16 June 1943 | Succeeded by Generalleutnant Walter Schilling |
| Preceded by General der Panzertruppe Joachim Lemelsen | Commander of 14. Armee; 15 October 1944 – 24 October 1944 | Succeeded by General der Artillerie Heinz Ziegler |
