= Werner Richter =

German general and Knight's Cross recipient (1893–1944)

- Born: 21 October 1893
- Died: 3 June 1944 (aged 50); Riga, Soviet Union
- Military career
- Allegiance: Nazi Germany
- Branch: Army (Wehrmacht)
- Rank: Generalleutnant
- Commands: 87th Infantry Division; 263rd Infantry Division
- Conflicts: World War II
- Awards: Knight's Cross of the Iron Cross

Werner Richter (21 October 1893 – 3 June 1944) was a German general during World War II. He was a recipient of the Knight's Cross of the Iron Cross.

Werner Richter was wounded on 21 May 1944 and died in Riga on 3 June 1944.

== Awards and decorations ==
- Knight's Cross of the Iron Cross on 7 February 1944 as Generalleutnant and commander of 263rd Infantry Division

Military offices
Preceded by Generalleutnant Bogislav von Studnitz	Commander of 87th Infantry Division; 22 August 1942 – 1 February 1943	Succeeded by General der Artillerie Walter Hartmann
Preceded by Generalleutnant Hans Traut	Commander of 263rd Infantry Division; 1 April 1943 – 21 May 1944	Succeeded by Generalmajor Rudolf Sieckenius
