= Panzer Division Tatra =

- Active: August 1944 - April 1945
- Country: Nazi Germany
- Branch: Army
- Type: Panzer
- Role: Armoured warfare
- Size: Division
- Engagements: Slovak National Uprising; Budapest offensive

Panzer Division Tatra (Panzer Training Division Tatra) was an armored division of the German Army formed in Moravia in August 1944. The division was hastily formed during the Slovak National Uprising of 1944 when the Germans feared that Slovakia might break away from the Axis powers and open the way for the advancing Red Army. After a brief punitive expedition against the Slovaks, the division was converted into a training formation. In March 1945, it was reorganized into the 232nd Panzer Division and was lost fighting in western Hungary.

== History ==
=== Panzer Division Tatra ===
The division was formed as an emergency battle group (German: Alarmkampfgruppe) around a core of 1st Panzer Division veterans, the units from the 178th Panzer Division, and the staff of the Kleine Karpaten training facility in Malacky. Other personnel, according to Samuel Mitcham, "came from all over the map". The division's only tank battalion had 28 obsolete Panzer III and Panzer IV tanks and three Tiger Is. The division began by suppressing resistance in southern Moravia, and on 29 August 1944, moved to Žilina in north-western Slovakia.

The improvised division performed well against the Slovak uprising. It crushed the Slovaks, who were being aided by Soviet advisers, and recaptured Bratislava (German: Pressburg). After this initial success, the division was reorganized into a training division (German: Panzer-Feldausbildungs-Division Tatra). The division incorporated the XVII Panzer Corps command and its mechanized infantry and units of inland military districts; the men of the 1st Panzer eventually left Tatra. The division remained in Slovakia until the end of 1944. At the end of December 1944 the division had a total of 58 light tanks, 39 medium tanks, and 7 heavy tanks. There were a toal of only 2301 enlisted men and officers. In March 1945 (or, according to different sources, on 21 February 1945), the division was reorganized into the 232nd Reserve Panzer Division.

=== 232nd Panzer Division ===
After the reorganization, former training regiments of Tatra (82nd and 85th Training Regiments) were also reorganized and renamed the 101st and 102nd Panzer Grenadiers. Auxiliary units (flak, etc.) retained their original Tatra numbers. The unit was hurriedly sent to join the reserves of Army Group South and was almost immediately thrown into defensive action with the 8th Army.

On 26 March, the division was stationed near Marcaltő in Hungary. The fighting continued for three more days. Divisional commander Generalmajor Hans-Ulrich Back was wounded on 29 March and escaped captivity. The division ceased to exist by 1 April 1945.

== Commanding officers ==
- Generalleutnant Friedrich-Wilhelm von Loeper, 9 October 1944
- Generalmajor Hans-Ulrich Back, February – March 1945

== Sources ==
- Samuel Mitcham (2007). German Order of Battle: Panzer, Panzer Grenadier, and Waffen SS Divisions in World War II. Stackpole Books. ISBN 0-8117-3438-2.
- Huber Meyer (2005). The 12th SS: The History Of The Hitler Youth Panzer Division. Stackpole Books. ISBN 0-8117-3199-5.
