= Theodor Kretschmer =

- Born: 26 November 1901; Burghaun, German Empire
- Died: 5 December 1986 (aged 85); Schlitz, West Germany
- Military career
- Allegiance: Weimar Republic; Nazi Germany
- Branch: Army
- Service years: 1919–1945
- Rank: Generalmajor
- Commands: 16th Panzer Division; 17th Panzer Division
- Conflicts: World War II
- Awards: Knight's Cross of the Iron Cross

Theodor Kretschmer (26 November 1901 – 5 December 1986) was a general in the Wehrmacht of Nazi Germany during World War II. He was a recipient of the Knight's Cross of the Iron Cross.

== Military career ==
Kretschmer joined the German Army in 1919 and was commissioned in 1924. After a number of staff positions he briefly became commander of the 16th Panzer-Division in late 1944 before taking over as the commander of the 17th Panzer Division on 1 February 1945. Kretschmer was promoted to Major General on 1 April 1945. He surrendered his division on 11 May 1945 east of Prague. Convicted in the Soviet Union as a war criminal, he was held until 1955.

== Awards and decorations ==
- Knight's Cross of the Iron Cross on 8 March 1945 as Oberst and commander of 17. Panzer-Division

Military offices
| Preceded by Generalleutnant Dietrich von Müller | Commander of 16. Panzer-Division; 1 December 1944 – 31 January 1945 | Succeeded by Generalleutnant Kurt Treuhaupt |
| Preceded by Oberst Albert Brux | Commander of 17. Panzer-Division; 1 February 1945 – 8 May 1945 | Succeeded by None |
