= Sampława =

- Village
- Location within Poland
- Coordinates: 53°29′53″N 19°40′18″E
- Country: Poland
- Voivodeship: Warmian-Masurian
- County: Iława
- Gmina: Lubawa
- Population: 440

Sampława ([samˈpwava]; German: Samplau) is a village in the administrative district of Gmina Lubawa, within Iława County, Warmian-Masurian Voivodeship, in northern Poland.

== Notable residents ==
- Karl-Friedrich von der Meden (1896–1961), Wehrmacht general
