= Alfred Hemmann =

- Born: 13 October 1895
- Died: 26 September 1957 (aged 61)
- Military career
- Allegiance: German Empire; Weimar Republic; Nazi Germany
- Branch: Army
- Service years: 1914–1919; 1935–1945
- Rank: Generalleutnant
- Commands: 263rd Infantry Division
- Conflicts: World War II
- Awards: Knight's Cross of the Iron Cross

Alfred Hemmann (13 October 1895 – 26 September 1957) was a German general in the Wehrmacht during World War II. He was a recipient of the Knight's Cross of the Iron Cross of Nazi Germany. Hemmann surrendered to Soviet forces in May 1945 in the Courland Pocket; he was released in 1955.

== Awards and decorations ==
- Knight's Cross of the Iron Cross on 21 August 1941 as Oberstleutnant and commander of Infanterie-Regiment 426

Military offices
| Preceded by Generalmajor Rudolf Sieckenius | Commander of 263rd Infantry Division; September 1944 – 9 May 1945 | Succeeded by None |
