= Franz Karl (general) =

German general (1888–1964)

- Born: 1 January 1888; Glonn, German Empire
- Died: 18 March 1964 (aged 76); Munich, West Germany
- Military career
- Allegiance: German Empire (to 1918); Weimar Republic (to 1933); Nazi Germany
- Branch: Army (Wehrmacht)
- Service years: 1907–1945
- Rank: Generalleutnant
- Commands: 263. Infanterie-Division; 182. Infanterie-Division
- Conflicts: World War I World War II: Battle of Belgium; Battle of France
- Awards: Knight's Cross of the Iron Cross

Franz Karl (1 January 1888 – 18 March 1964) was a German general during World War II who commanded several divisions. He was a recipient of the Knight's Cross of the Iron Cross.

== Awards and decorations ==
- Knight's Cross of the Iron Cross on 5 August 1940 as Generalleutnant and commander of 263. Infanterie-Division

Military offices
| Preceded by none | Commander of 263. Infanterie-Division; 1 September 1939 - 14 November 1940 | Succeeded by Generalleutnant Ernst Haeckel |
