= Dietrich von Müller =

German WWII general (1891–1961)

- Born: 16 September 1891; Malchow, German Empire
- Died: 3 January 1961 (aged 69); Hamburg, West Germany
- Military career
- Allegiance: Nazi Germany
- Branch: Army
- Service years: 1910-1945
- Rank: Generalleutnant
- Commands: 16th Panzer Division
- Conflicts: World War II
- Awards: Knight's Cross of the Iron Cross with Oak Leaves and Swords

Dietrich von Müller (16 September 1891 – 3 January 1961) was a German general during World War II. Just before the end of World War II he was promoted to Generalleutnant and awarded the Knight's Cross of the Iron Cross with Oak Leaves and Swords.

On 19 April 1945 he was taken prisoner by members of 1st Czechoslovak Partisan Brigade of Jan Žižka on the Hoštice castle, Kroměříž District, Moravia, Czech Republic and handed over to the Red Army. Convicted as a war criminal in the Soviet Union, he was held until the winter of 1955.

Military offices
Preceded by Generalmajor Hans-Ulrich Back	Commander of 16. Panzer-Division; 14 August 1944 – March 1945	Succeeded by Oberst Theodor Kretschmer
