= Günther Angern =

German general (1893–1943)

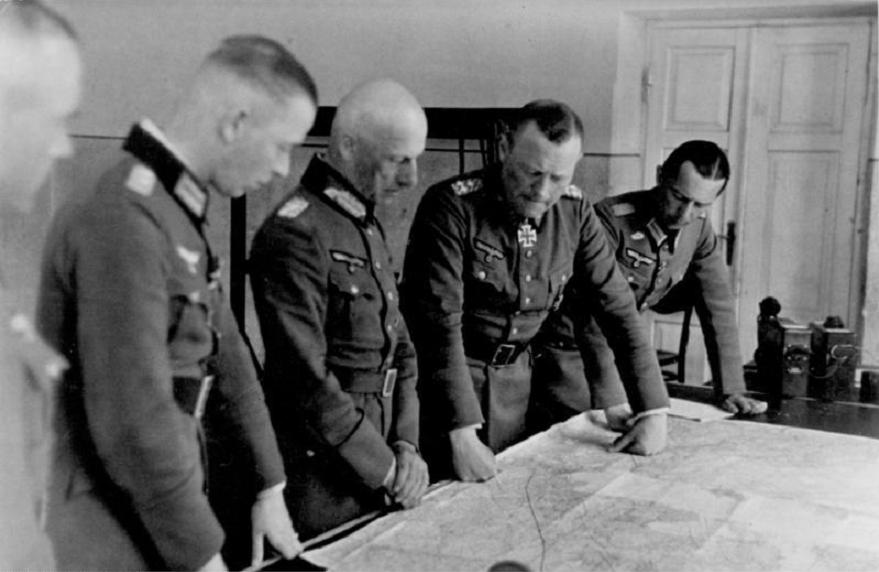
- Günter Angern (far right)
- Born: 5 March 1893; Kolberg, German Empire
- Died: 2 February 1943 (aged 49); Stalingrad, Soviet Union
- Military career
- Allegiance: German Empire; Weimar Republic; Nazi Germany
- Branch: German Army
- Service years: 1911–1943
- Rank: Generalleutnant
- Commands: 11th Panzer Division; 16th Panzer Division
- Conflicts: World War I; World War II; Occupation of Czechoslovakia; Invasion of Poland; Operation Weserübung; Battle of France; Battle of Arras (1940); Operation Barbarossa; Battle of Białystok–Minsk; Battle of Smolensk (1941)
- Awards: Knight's Cross of the Iron Cross; German Cross in Gold

Günther Angern (5 March 1893 – 2 February 1943) was a German general in the Wehrmacht during World War II who commanded the 16th Panzer Division during the Battle of Stalingrad. He was also a recipient of the Knight's Cross of the Iron Cross of Nazi Germany.

== Biography ==
Born in Kolberg, Angern joined the army of Imperial Germany as an Fahnenjunker (officer cadet). He was commissioned in the infantry and fought in World War I during which he was awarded the Iron Cross, 1st and 2nd class and the Hanseatic Cross of Hamburg. In the interwar period, he joined the Reichswehr (after 1935, the Wehrmacht) and by 1938 was commander of the 3rd Schützen (Rifle) Brigade. The following year he led the 11th Schützen Brigade. In August 1940, now an Oberst, he was awarded the Knight's Cross of the Iron Cross while commanding the brigade.

On 15 August 1941, during the later stages of Operation Barbarossa, Angern was given command of the 11th Panzer Division. His time leading the division was brief, for he was wounded nine days later. He had a long period off active duty because of his wounds and during this time was promoted to Generalmajor and received the German Cross in Gold. (Note: The rank of Generalmajor is equivalent to that of brigadier general in the United States Army.)

Returning to duty on 15 September 1942, Angern took command of the 16th Panzer Division, operating to the north of the city of Stalingrad, supporting the divisions fighting in the city. By mid-November, the division had been reduced to 4,000 personnel and had been ordered to withdraw to the Donets. The Red Army began a counteroffensive which encircled Stalingrad, trapping several elements of the division, including Angern and his staff, in the city along with the Sixth Army. Angern remained in Stalingrad throughout the siege and was promoted to Generalleutnant on 21 January 1943. (Note: The rank of Generalleutnant is equivalent to that of major general in the United States Army.)

The advance of the Red Army pressed the Germans into the eastern portion of the Stalingrad perimeter and in mid-January, along with some other staff officers of the division, Angern considered escaping the encirclement by passing through the frontlines wearing captured Red Army uniforms accompanied by Russian Hiwis. Nothing came of the plan and, with defeat inevitable, Angern committed suicide on 2 February 1943.

== Notes ==
Footnotes

Citations

Military offices
Preceded by General der Panzertruppe Ludwig Crüwell	Commander of 11th Panzer Division; 15 August 1941 – 24 August 1941	Succeeded by General der Panzertruppe Hans-Karl Freiherr von Esebeck
Preceded by Generaloberst Hans-Valentin Hube	Commander of 16th Panzer Division; 15 September 1942 – 2 February 1943	Succeeded by Generalmajor Burkhart Müller-Hillebrand
