= Gau Swabia =

Administrative division of Nazi Germany

- Gau of Nazi Germany
- 1928–1945
- Flag Coat of arms

- Map of Nazi Germany showing its administrative subdivisions (Gaue and Reichsgaue).
- Capital: Augsburg
- Population
  - 17 May 1939: 934,311
- Government
- Gauleiter
  - 1928–1945: Karl Wahl
- History
  - Establishment: 1 October 1928
  - Disestablishment: 8 May 1945
Preceded by	Succeeded by
Bavaria	Bavaria
- Today part of: Germany

Gau Swabia (German: Gau Schwaben), formed on 1 October 1928, was an administrative division of Nazi Germany in Swabia, Bavaria, from 1933 to 1945. From 1928 to 1933, it was the regional subdivision of the Nazi Party in that area.

== History ==
=== Establishment of the Gaue within the party ===
The Nazi Gau (plural Gaue) system was originally established in a party conference on 22 May 1926, in order to improve administration of the party structure. In the early stages, the borders and leaders of these Gaue fluctuated frequently, mainly due to internal power struggles. The Gau Swabia was, for the most part, identical with today's Regierungsbezirk Swabia.

=== The Gau from 1926 to 1933 ===
The Gau Swabia came under the leadership of Karl Wahl (1892–1981), later an SS-Obergruppenführer, on 1 October 1928, when the Gau system in Bavaria was formalised, and remained under his control for the duration of the existence of the Gau. Until 1930, Bavaria, as the heartland of the Nazi movement in the 1920s, was seen by Hitler as his personal realm, the local Gaue commonly being called Untergaue (English: Sub-Gaue), to show their dependence on the head of the party. Only when Hitler's ambitions turned national did his interest in Bavarian affairs dwindle. With the end of the internal power struggle, the following six Gaue had been established in Bavaria:

- Gau Bayerische Ostmark
- Gau Franken
- Gau Mainfranken
- Gau München-Oberbayern
- Gau Rheinpfalz
- Gau Schwaben

=== The Gau from 1933 to 1945 ===
With the ascent of the Nazis to power on 30 January 1933, the so-called Machtergreifung, the party immediately began to disassemble the power of the German states, the Länder. It was envisioned by the Nazis that the Party-Gaue would take the place of the old structure. In reality, Hitler was afraid of such a move, fearing it would upset local party leaders and could possibly result in an inner-party power struggle.

In Augsburg, the Swabian capital, the Nazis did not gain a strong foothold straight away, only having received 33% of the votes at the 1933 elections. Wahl even interceded with Hitler not to dismiss the mayor of Augsburg, unsuccessfully. Nevertheless, their rise to power there could not be stopped either and by 1941, the party had 39,000 members in the city.

Gradually, the Gauleiter (English: Gau Leader) took control over their territories, reducing the local Minister Presidents, nominally the highest office in the German states, to figureheads. As such, the development of the Gau from a form of inner-party administration to a political and administrative sub-division of the country was gradual, not sudden, but completed by 1934. The process termed Gleichschaltung took care of all political opposition and the "Law on the Reconstruction of the Reich" of 30 January 1934 can possibly be seen as the final date for the transfer of power from the states to the Gaue.

In Swabia, a relatively small Gau, the local Gauleiter Wahl had to initially fend off attempts by his more powerful neighbor, Adolf Wagner, Gauleiter of the Munich-Upper Bavaria region, to incooperate Swabia into his Gau. Wahl was actually the only one of the Bavarian Gauleiter not to have graduated from University. Unlike Wagner, who was a personal friend of Hitler's, Wahl wielded no real influence with the party leadership.

The Gauleiter was directly appointed by Hitler and only answerable to him. In practice, Hitler interfered little in the affairs of the local leaders and their power was almost absolute.

Parallel to the five Bavarian Gauleiter, a Bavarian Minister President still existed during this time, the Nazi politician Ludwig Siebert and, after his death in 1942, his successor, Paul Giesler. As a third authority in the still existing state, Franz Ritter von Epp held the office of Reichsstatthalter but wielded no real power.

Swabia did not have a concentration camp within its boundaries but its close proximity to Dachau meant, that many of its subcamps were in the Gau. Swabia was also home to the Ordensburg Sonthofen, an elite Nazi training facility.

As of 1938, Augsburg had around 900 Jews living within the city boundaries and was home to a magnificent synagogue, destroyed during Kristallnacht on 10 November 1938. It also had 200 Jewish men sent to Dachau that day. In the following years, the Jewish population of the city was gradually deported to concentration camps, that of 3 April 1942, numbering 128 persons, being the largest deportation since the Kristallnacht. Outside of the capital, the Jewish population of Swabia was small, only Memmingen and Nördlingen having substantial numbers.

After the forced addition of Austria to the Reich in March 1938, small parts of the former country were added to the south of the Gau Schwaben, specifically the Jungholz region.

With the outbreak of the Second World War, the power of the Gauleiters, and therefore the power of the Gaue compared to the state government, increased. Many of the Gauleiters were put in charge of the war effort in their Military District (German: Wehrkreis). Swabia, with its capital Augsburg, was a vital place for the war effort, being home to the manufacturers MAN AG and Messerschmitt. For this reason, Augsburg suffered heavily under allied bombing raids. Many of the companies in Swabia and Augsburg which were in some way involved in the war effort also used slave labour to be able to continue producing. A large number of those died through exhaustion, mistreatment and allied air raids on the production facilities. A monument in Augsburg remembers those victims of the Nazi regime.

As the war progressed and Nazi Germany grew more desperate, the Gauleiters were put in total control of the war effort in their Gau. On 16 November 1942 Wahl, along with all Gauleiters, was named a Reich Defense Commissioner (Reichsverteidigungskommissar).

In September 1944, the Gauleiters were ordered to form the Volkssturm in a last effort to mobilise all of the male population. Near the end of the war in April 1945, Wahl and Swabia were subordinated to Paul Giesler, the Gauleiter of Gau Munich-Upper Bavaria, who was named Reich Defense Commissioner - South and, in addition to his own Gau, was placed in charge of Swabia and three of the formerly Austrian Gaue (Reichsgau Salzburg, Reichsgau Upper Danube and Reichsgau Tirol-Vorarlberg).

In the last days of the war, Karl Wahl made no effort to prevent the hand over of Augsburg to the allies. Shortly after, he was arrested.

== Aftermath ==
Almost all of Swabia, like the rest of Bavaria, became part of the American occupation zone. Lindau, at the very south-west of the Gau, became part of the French occupation zone. Political power, at first lying with the occupation authorities, was soon returned to the new Bavarian government. The Regierungsbezirk Swabia, never having formally been dissolved, took control of the civil administration of the region again. Its most pressing issue was the reconstruction of the destroyed cities and the refugee problem, nearly a quarter of the population of Augsburg after the war being refugees and displaced persons.

Karl Wahl, Gauleiter of Swabia for almost 17 years, only served a light sentence after the war. He died in 1981, aged 88. Philipp Meyer, Nazi Kreisleiter for Donauwörth, was sentenced to death at end of the war for refusing to evacuate his district and prepare it for defense and, in post-war West Germany, he became the first former Kreisleiter to be elected for the West German parliament, the Bundestag.

== Other Nazi organisations in the region ==
The various departments of the Nazi organisation were by no means streamlined with the Gau system, but rather fiercely independent and competitive to each other. For example, while Bavaria was sub-divided in six Gaue, it was also divided in four sections of the SA, three sections of the SS and six sections of the Hitler Jugend.

The Gau Schwaben belonged to the military district Wehrkreis VII, which had its headquarters in Munich.

== Gauleiter ==
The highest position in the Gau, Gauleiter, was held by only one person during the history of the Gau Schwaben:

- Karl Wahl 1 October 1928 to 8 May 1945

=== Deputy Gauleiter ===
Second in charge were the Stellvertretende Gauleiter:

- Mathies Kellner — 1934
- Franz Schmid — 17 March 1935 to 10 November 1937
- Georg Traeg — 15 December 1937 to 9 September 1942
- Anton Mündler — 1942 to 1945

== Jewish population of the Gau Schwaben ==
The Jewish population of Swabia had remained relatively stable from the turn of the 20th century to 1933. With the Nazis rise to power it declined through deportation and emigration. After 1939, few of those remaining would have had a chance to escape or even survive the Holocaust.

Kreis	1933	1939
Augsburg (city)	1,030	551
Augsburg (land)	131	93
Babenhausen	50	30
Dillingen an der Donau	4	-
Donauwörth	-	-
Friedberg	1	-
Füssen	-	-
Günzburg	10	11
Illertissen	50	30
Kempten (city)	50	25
Kempten (land)	2	-
Krumbach	65	43

Kreis	1933	1939
Lindau	12	4
Marktoberdorf	-	-
Memmingen (city)	161	70
Memmingen (land)	26	21
Mindelheim	13	7
Neuburg an der Donau	1	-
Neu-Ulm	44	23
Nördlingen	186	69
Schwabmünchen	-	3
Sonthofen	3	1
Wertingen	109	70
Overall	1948	1051

Source: "Der Gau Schwaben der NSDAP" (in German). Verwaltungsgeschichte.de.

- A Kreis (English: District) is a German administrative subdivision, now ranking below the Regierungsbezirk in Bavaria. During the Nazi era, it ranked below the Gau. At the head of each Kreis there stood a Kreisleiter, answerable to the Gauleiter.

== See also ==
- List of Gaue of Nazi Germany
- List of subcamps of Dachau
