= 16th Panzer Division =

German army division during World War II

- 16. Panzer-Division
- Unit insignia
- Active: November 1940 – 8 May 1945
- Country: Germany
- Branch: Army
- Type: Panzer
- Role: Armoured warfare
- Size: Division
- Garrison/HQ: Münster Wuppertal
- Engagements: World War II; Operation Barbarossa; Battle of Brody (1941); Battle of Kiev (1941); Battle of Stalingrad; Allied invasion of Italy; Korsun–Cherkassy pocket; Kamenets–Podolsky pocket; Prague offensive

Commanders
- Notable commanders: Hans-Valentin Hube

The 16th Panzer Division (German: 16. Panzer-Division) was a formation of the German Army in World War II. It was formed in November 1940 from the 16th Infantry Division. It took part in Operation Barbarossa, the invasion of the Soviet Union in June 1941, operating in the southern sector of the Eastern Front. After the Soviet offensive in November 1942 the division was trapped in Stalingrad, where it surrendered in February 1943. A new 16th Panzer Division was formed in 1943 and sent to Italy where it was part of the unsuccessful German defense against the Allied invasion of Italy. Sent back to the Eastern Front in November 1943 the division once more saw action in the southern sector, taking part in the relief operation of the Korsun-Cherkassy Pocket and being part of the Kamenets-Podolsky pocket. It eventually surrendered to Soviet and American forces in Czechoslovakia in May 1945.

== History ==
The division was formed in Autumn 1940 from the 16th Infantry Division which had previously taken part in the German invasion of France in 1940. The division, based in the Wehrkreis VI in the Westphalia region of Germany, received the 2nd Tank Regiment from the 1st Panzer Division and moved its home base from Münster to Wuppertal and came under the command of Hans-Valentin Hube.

The new tank division was sent to Romania and Bulgaria in early 1941 but kept in reserve and did not take part in the German invasion of Yugoslavia and Greece. It briefly returned to Germany before being sent to Poland for the preparation of the invasion of the Soviet Union. The division fought in the southern sector of the Eastern Front, taking part in the Battle of Kiev and in the German drive to the Sea of Azov. At the Battle of Dubno 293 Soviet tanks were destroyed. By late November the 16th Panzer Division had run out of supplies and could only retreat after having been resupplied during a Soviet counter offensive. It fought in defensive positions during the winter of 1941–42 and took part in anti-partisan operations in the Stalino region. The division participated in the fighting of the Second Battle of Kharkov and, following this, the German summer offensive, Case Blue. During these operations the division played a role in the encirclement of 50 Soviet divisions and the capture of 665,000 Soviet soldiers at the Battle of Kiev. The division also destroyed a thousand Soviet tanks.

The Division was part of the offensive towards Stalingrad and reached the Volga river north of the city on 23 August 1942. Supporting the flank of the German attack on the city the division suffered heavy losses and, reduced to a strength of 4,000 men by mid-November, was scheduled for replacement. During its withdrawal from the front line the division was caught up in the Soviet counter offensive, Operation Uranus, which started on 19 November. Most of the division was trapped in what became the Stalingrad pocket while a smaller number of units were pushed west. The main body of the division was destroyed at Stalingrad during the battle and when the Axis forces surrendered on 2 February 1943, with the commander of the division, Günther von Angern, committing suicide to avoid Soviet captivity.

Reformed in Brittany in March 1943 from new recruits and units who had not been trapped at Stalingrad the division was sent to Italy in June 1943. It was part of the German defences during the Allied invasion of Italy where it initially inflicted heavy casualties on the landing forces but also lost more than half of its tanks in the process, coming under fire from naval guns supporting the landing. Despite the 16th Panzer Division performing adequately under his command, Rudolf Sieckenius was made a scapegoat for the German defeat at Salerno and removed from his position. It took part in the German retreat and defensive operations in Italy until November 1943 when it was sent back to the Eastern Front.

The 16th Panzer Division was used in a number of locations in the southern sector after this in an attempt to stabilize the German front lines, frequently being moved between points of crisis. It took part in the only partially successful effort to relieve the trapped German forces in the Korsun-Cherkassy Pocket early 1944 and found itself trapped in the Kamenets-Podolsky pocket but managed to break out with the main body of the 1st Panzer Army in April 1944. After limited resupplies the division took part in the German retreat to Poland and also participated in further anti-partisan operations in the area around Daleszyce. Daleszyce was a center of Polish resistance to the German occupation, mostly carried out by the Home Army, and severely destroyed through shelling by Wehrmacht units in 1944 and eventually burned down.

In January 1945 the division was entrapped once more with the start of the Soviet Vistula–Oder Offensive but managed to reach German lines. After a short rest and resupply in February it fought in Silesia and Czechoslovakia. With the German surrender the division attempted to reach American lines, with some parts succeeding in doing so but mostly being handed back to the Soviet forces.

== Commanders ==
The commander of the division:

Rank	Name	Period	Notes
Generalmajor/Generalleutnant	Hans-Valentin Hube	1 November 1940 – 14 September 1942	Killed in an aircraft accident, 21 April 1944
Generalmajor	Günther von Angern	15 September 1942 – 2 February 1943	Suicide at Stalingrad, 2 February 1943
Oberst	Burkhart Müller-Hillebrand	March 1943	
Generalmajor	Rudolf Sieckenius	March – November 1943	Killed in action when personally attacking enemy tanks with Panzerfaust, 29 April 1945
Oberst	Hans-Ulrich Back	1 November 1943 – 14 August 1944	
Generalmajor	Dietrich von Müller	August 1944 – March 1945	Captured by Czech partisans of the Brigade of Jan Žižka, 19 April 1945
Oberst	Theodor Kretschmer	March 1945	
Oberst	Kurt Treuhaupt	April – May 1945	

== Organization ==
Structure of the division:

- Headquarters
- 2nd Panzer Regiment
- 64th Panzergrenadier Regiment
- 79th Panzergrenadier Regiment
- 16th Artillery Regiment
- 16th Motorcycle Battalion
- 16th Panzer Reconnaissance Battalion
- 16th Tank Destroyer Battalion
- 16th Panzer Engineer Battalion
- 16th Panzer Signal Battalion
- 274th Army Anti-Aircraft Battalion (added in 1942)
- 16th Panzer Divisional Supply Group

== Post-war ==
After the war a memorial was erected in Münster, the original garrison headquarters of the division, for the soldiers of the 16th Panzer Division. A small number of Stalingrad survivors held annual reunions in the city up until the 1990s. Winfried Nachtwei, a former member of the German Parliament for the Green party from Münster, carried out some research into the division and its part and responsibility in the Battle of Stalingrad that saw more than 700,000 casualties, the majority Soviet soldiers and civilians. His research also established that, of the unknown number of soldiers of the division that surrendered at Stalingrad only 128 returned after the war.

The original copies of the war diaries of the division from mid-1943 onward were destroyed during a fire in Potsdam in April 1945 while earlier editions had been moved to Liegnitz, now Legnica in Poland. These fell into American hands in 1945, having been evacuated to Thuringia, were taken to the US for research and gradually returned to West Germany from 1962 onward.
