= Augsburg Synagogue =

Synagogue in Augsburg, Bavaria, Germany

- Augsburger Synagoge
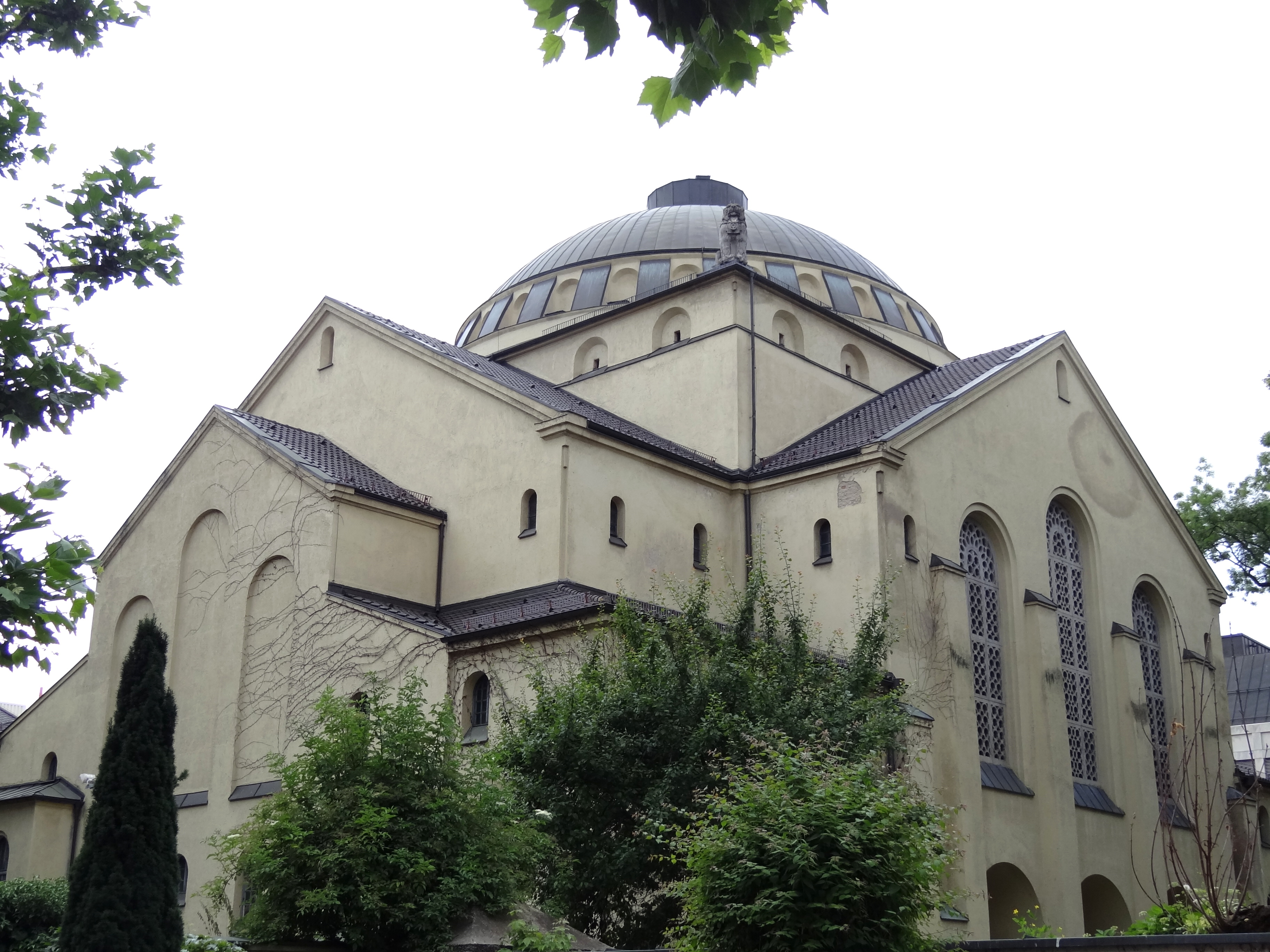
- The domed central building in 2013

Religion
- Affiliation: Judaism
- Ecclesiastical or organisational status: Synagogue
- Status: Active

Location
- Location: Halderstraße 6–8, Augsburg, Bavaria
- Country: Germany
- Interactive map of Augsburg Synagogue
- Coordinates: 48°21′56″N 10°53′31″E

Architecture
- Architects: Fritz Landauer; Heinrich Lömpel
- Type: Synagogue
- Style: Art Nouveau with Byzantine Revival and Orientalizing elements
- Groundbreaking: 30 April 1914
- Completed: 1917

Augsburg Synagogue (German: Augsburger Synagoge) is a synagogue on Halderstraße in Augsburg, Bavaria, Germany. It serves as the religious centre of the Israelitische Kultusgemeinde Schwaben-Augsburg, the Jewish community of Augsburg and Bavarian Swabia. Built between 1914 and 1917 to designs by Fritz Landauer and Heinrich Lömpel, it stands near Königsplatz in the city centre.

The synagogue was damaged during Kristallnacht in November 1938 and subsequently during the Allied air raids on Augsburg. A smaller prayer room returned to communal use in 1963. Restoration of the main synagogue took place between 1974 and 1985, and the building was rededicated on 1 September 1985. Since that year, the complex has also housed the Jewish Museum Augsburg Swabia.

The building combines Art Nouveau with Byzantine Revival and Orientalizing details, employing traditional regional forms alongside modern construction techniques. Its design has been discussed as an example of a new approach to synagogue architecture associated with Reform Judaism. The synagogue and its adjoining community buildings are protected as architectural monuments.

== History ==
=== Planning and construction ===
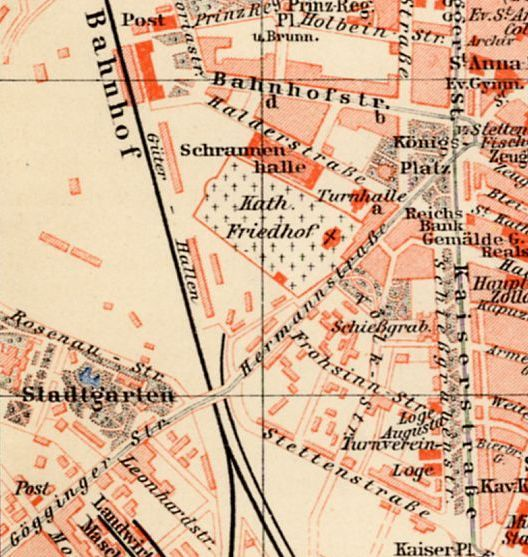
Detail of a 1905 map of Augsburg showing the area of the future synagogue

Towards the end of the 19th century, Augsburg's Jewish population grew substantially through migration from rural communities. Despite repeated alterations and extensions, the existing synagogue on Wintergasse no longer provided sufficient space. A synagogue building association was therefore established in 1896. Using donated funds, it purchased the former Degmair garden property on Halderstraße in 1903.

An architectural competition was subsequently held, and the design by Fritz Landauer (1883–1968) and Heinrich Lömpel (1877–1951) was selected. The foundation stone was laid on 30 April 1914. Construction was delayed by the World War I, and the synagogue was formally inaugurated on 4 April 1917.

In 1917, the Augsburg firm Koulen & Sohn installed a two-manual pipe organ with 32 stops and pneumatic action. The instrument cost approximately 14,000 gold marks.

=== Nazi period and World War II ===
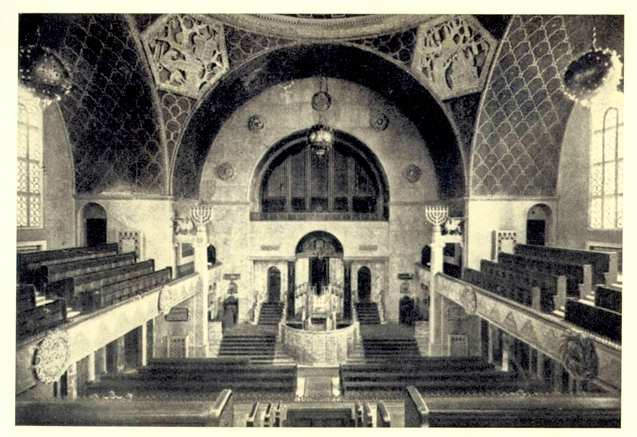
The sanctuary in 1919

During the night of 9–10 November 1938, Nazi perpetrators entered the synagogue, destroyed parts of its furnishings and set the sanctuary on fire. The fire was extinguished because of the danger posed by nearby fuel storage and surrounding buildings. Gestapo officers subsequently inspected the site and alleged that members of the Jewish community had started the fire themselves.

The damage rendered the synagogue unusable for communal worship. Municipal offices, including welfare and clothing distribution services, occupied the community buildings facing the street. The complex also served as an assembly point for the deportation of Jewish families from Bavarian Swabia.

From 1941 until the end of the World War II, the municipal theatre used the sanctuary to store scenery. From 1942, the two community buildings were occupied by the National Socialist People's Welfare organisation and a regional Luftwaffe staff. An anti-aircraft gun position was installed on top of the dome.

=== Preservation of the organ ===
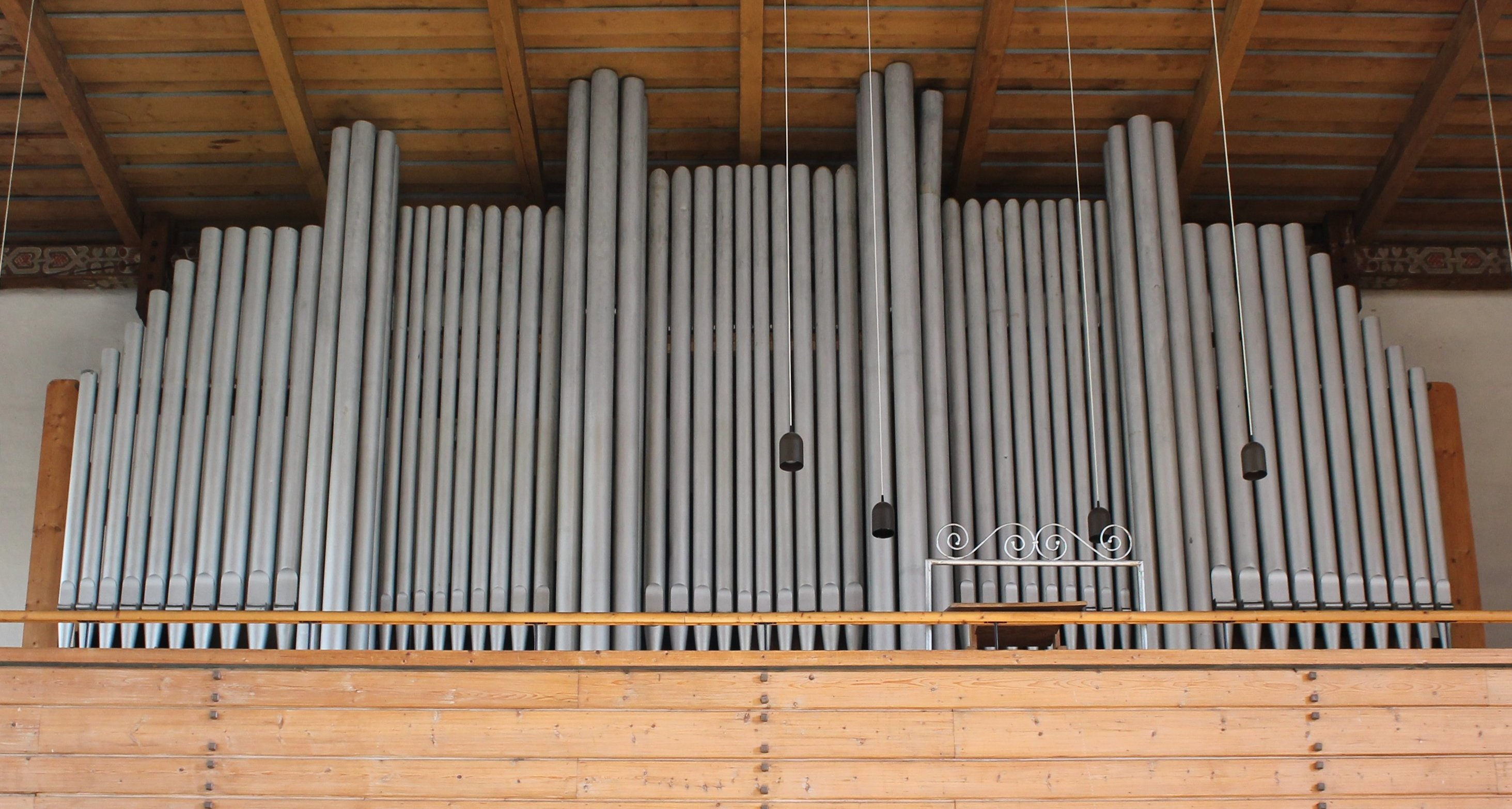
The synagogue's former organ in Christ the King Church, Weßling

The fire left the organ unplayable. To prevent its dismantling by the Nazis, including the possible recovery of its metal components, the rabbi sold it in 1940 to a priest he knew in Weßling. In 1941, it was transferred to the Catholic parish church of Christ the King there.

The instrument was too large for the church, and parts of the ceiling were initially removed to accommodate its largest pipes. The problem was subsequently resolved by bending the pipes, and the organ was restored. It remained in use there in 2017.

=== Post-war restoration ===
Following the war, provisional repairs allowed the synagogue to reopen on a limited basis by 16 May 1945.

The smaller prayer room, known as the Kleine Synagoge ("Small Synagogue"), returned to use by the Jewish community on 15 December 1963. Restoration of the rest of the complex took place between 1974 and 1985 under Julius Spokojny, the long-serving chairman of the Israelitische Kultusgemeinde Schwaben-Augsburg. The restored main synagogue was formally rededicated on 1 September 1985.

The Jewish Museum Augsburg Swabia opened in the complex in 1985. The synagogue can be visited as part of a museum visit.

== Architecture ==
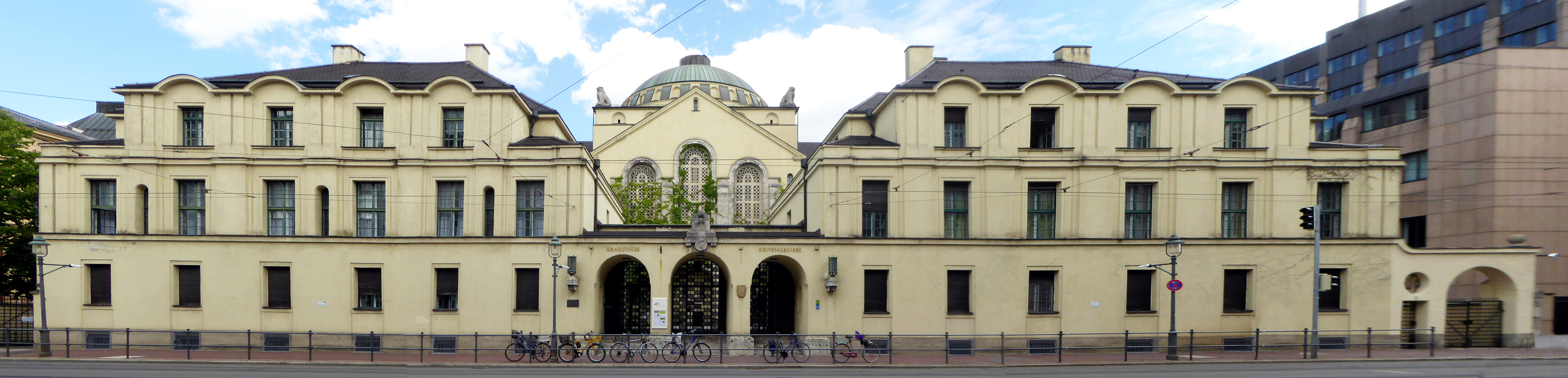
The southern façade facing Halderstraße

The complex consists of a central sanctuary building and several adjoining structures. The sanctuary is set back from Halderstraße behind two symmetrically arranged community buildings. An entrance hall with three arches stands between these buildings, which are connected to the sanctuary by two lateral wings.

The eastern wing contains a wedding hall and a weekday prayer room. The western wing contains a vestibule, a cloakroom and a fountain for ritual handwashing. A planted courtyard with a sphinx fountain occupies the centre of the complex.

The central building has a Greek cross plan. A reinforced concrete dome covers its centre, while four short gable roofs extend over the arms of the cross. Four stone lions flank the roofs. The sanctuary faces east.

The combination of Art Nouveau ornament, Byzantine and Orientalizing details, and modern structural techniques reflects the architectural ambitions of the Jewish community that commissioned the building. Historians have interpreted its design as an expression of the confidence of Augsburg Jews, who had enjoyed equal civic rights in the city for two generations by the time of its construction.
