= Friedrich-Wilhelm von Loeper =

Friedrich-Wilhelm Alexis von Loeper
- Born: 3 August 1888; Prieborn
- Died: 7 October 1983 (aged 95); Bückeburg
- Military career
- Allegiance: German Empire; Weimar Republic; Nazi Germany
- Branch: Army
- Service years: 1906–1945
- Rank: Generalleutnant
- Commands: 1st Light Division; 81st Infantry Division; 10th Infantry Division; Panzer Division Tatra
- Conflicts: World War II
- Awards: Knight's Cross of the Iron Cross

Friedrich-Wilhelm von Loeper (3 August 1888 – 7 October 1983) was a German general (Generalleutnant) in the Wehrmacht during World War II who commanded several divisions. He was a recipient of the Knight's Cross of the Iron Cross.

He was married to Irene Kühne (1891-1984) daughter of Erich Kühne, of Wanzleben.

== Awards ==
- Knight's Cross of the Iron Cross on 29 September 1941 as Generalleutnant and commander of 10. Infanterie-Division

Military offices
Preceded by Generalleutnant Erich Hoepner	Commander of 1.leichte-Division; 24 November 1938 – 12 October 1939	Succeeded by Generalmajor Werner Kempf
Preceded by None	Commander of 81. Infanterie-Division; 1 December 1939 – 5 October 1940	Succeeded by Generalmajor Hugo Ribstein
Preceded by Generalleutnant Conrad von Cochenhausen	Commander of 10. Infanterie-Division; 5 October 1940 – 15 April 1942	Succeeded by Oberst Hans Traut
