= Hans-Ulrich Back =

German general

- Born: 26 August 1896; Saarbrücken, German Empire
- Died: 14 February 1976 (aged 79); Hagen-Emst, West Germany
- Military career
- Allegiance: Nazi Germany
- Branch: Army (Wehrmacht)
- Rank: Generalmajor
- Commands: 16 Panzer Division; 178 Panzer Division; Panzer Division Tatra
- Conflicts: World War II
- Awards: Knight's Cross of the Iron Cross

Hans-Ulrich Back (26 August 1896 – 14 February 1976) was a German general in the Wehrmacht during World War II who held several divisional commands. He was a recipient of the Knight's Cross of the Iron Cross of Nazi Germany.

== Family ==
Back was the son of a former Prussian Major-General, Ulrich Back (1864–1947) and his wife, Emmy Seebohm (1874–1915). The elder Back had served from 1910 to 1917 in the German military mission to the Ottoman Empire.

== World War I ==
On 4 August 1914, Hans-Ulrich Back enlisted in the Ottoman army as a volunteer Fahnenjunker and in August, 1914 joined the Prussian army. On 19 October he was appointed Fahnenjunker in the 74th (1st Hannover) Infantry of the Imperial Army. From the middle of December, 1914 until February, 1915, he completed a training course in Döberitz and then was assigned to an infantry training battalion for a month. On 30 July 1915, he was promoted to Lieutenant. He went to the front with this regiment where he saw much combat and was injured many times in the next three years of the war. For his injuries he was awarded the Imperial Army's Silver Wound Badge. He was given many other awards, including two Iron Crosses, for his other achievements during the war.

== Interwar period ==
Immediately after the war he enlisted in the Freikorps Hasse Regiment, and then in the volunteer regiment "Haupt." Soon he was used in the transition army in the spring of 1920 at the Reichswehr Infantry Regiment 19 where, on 30 June 1920, he was discharged from active duty. He was awarded the rank of first lieutenant before being discharged.

Shortly after his discharge from the now shrunken German army, he transferred to the police, where, on 20 June 1921, he was promoted to lieutenant colonel. On 30 June 1926 he was promoted again to captain of the police. In the autumn of 1935 he made the change back to the Wehrmacht, which was again being expanded. He joined the 60th Infantry Regiment where, on 1 January 1936, he was promoted to major. On 12 October 1937, he was transferred to the Cavalry Rifle Regiment 4. The following year, on 1 February 1938, he was appointed commander of the 1st Battalion of the Rifle Regiment 2. Exactly one year later, on 1 February 1939, he was promoted to lieutenant colonel, and was commissioned to the leadership of the Rifle Regiment 2 within Panzer Division 2. This is where he would remain until the start of World War II.

== World War II ==
During the Polish campaign, Back was awarded the clasps for his Iron Crosses. He then returned to the 1st Battalion, of which he had been commander the year before. In the spring of 1940 he led the 1st Battalion through Belgium and France in the western campaign, and received the Knight's Cross of the Iron Cross in August, days later being reassigned to the 304 Rifle Regiment. He won the previous Iron Cross for the capture of the Somme Bridge in France.

Now at the 304th Rifle Regiment, he took part in the Balkan campaign and contributed to the invasion of Southern Russia, was redeployed to Central Russia, and was promoted to full colonel by 1 January 1942. He was reassigned that same year and saw many appointments including the 11th Panzer Greanadier Brigade, Commander of the Rapid Troops XVII, 16th Panzer Division, commander of the Panzertruppen X, 178th Panzer Division and the 232nd Panzer Division, where he had since been promoted to major general. On 28 March 1945, he was severely wounded on the Raab river in Hungary. He spent the end of the war in a hospital and avoided becoming a prisoner of war.

== Awards and decorations ==
- Knight's Cross of the Iron Cross on 5 August 1940 as Oberstleutnant and commander of I./Schützen-Regiment 2

Military offices
Preceded by Generalmajor Rudolf Sieckenius	Kommandeur of 16 Panzer Division; 1 November 1943 – 14 August 1944	Succeeded by Generalleutnant Dietrich von Müller
