= Tank Destruction Badge =

WW2 German military decoration

Tank Destruction Badge short: Panzervernichtungsabzeichen
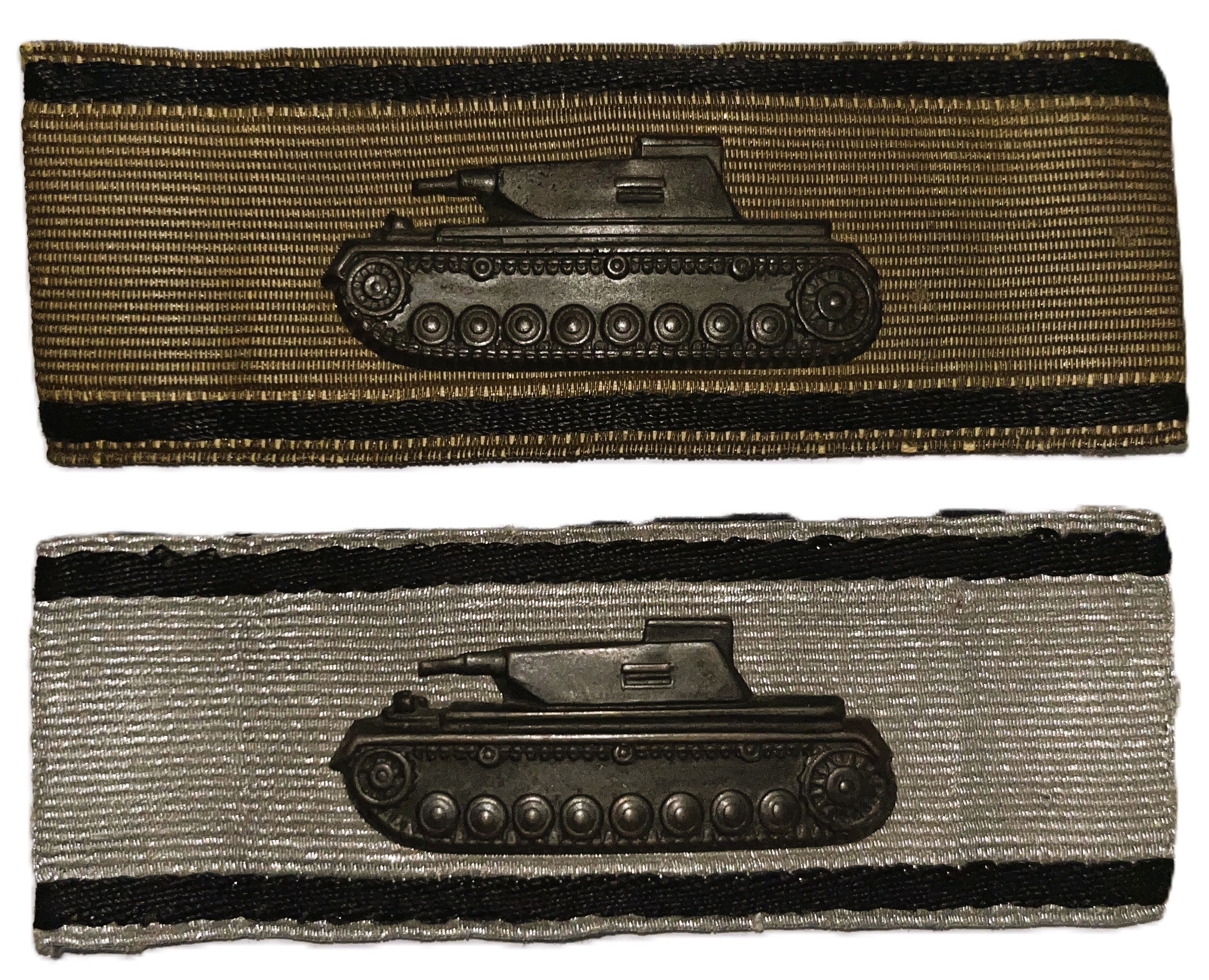
- Tank Destruction Badge in Gold and Silver
- Type: Badge
- Awarded for: Destroying an enemy tank with a hand-held weapon
- Presented by: Nazi Germany
- Eligibility: Military personnel
- Campaign: World War II
- Status: Obsolete
- Established: 9 March 1942

Highlights
- Total recipients: Approx. 18,500 Silver; Approx. 400 Gold

The Tank Destruction Badge (German: Sonderabzeichen für das Niederkämpfen von Panzerkampfwagen durch Einzelkämpfer) was a World War II German military decoration awarded to individuals of the Wehrmacht who had single-handedly destroyed an enemy tank or an armored combat vehicle using a hand-held weapon. Anti-tank units were ineligible for this award. It was established on 9 March 1942, but could be awarded for actions dating back to 22 June 1941 (the start of Operation Barbarossa, the German invasion of the Soviet Union). Prior to the introduction of this award, the soldier would be awarded the General Assault Badge for the action.

On 18 December 1943, the OKH introduced a gold class that recognised the single-handed destruction of five tanks. A soldier could therefore have four silver badges which would all be replaced by a gold version upon the destruction of a fifth tank (to which separate silver could be added thereafter).

== Variations ==
The tank destruction badge featured a blackened 42 mm by 18 mm Panzer IV tank attached to an 88 mm by 33 mm silver band. 2 mm from the top and bottom edges ran 4 mm black stripes. The badge was pinned to the sleeve, and then was "sewn on". It had a cloth or cotton backing.

The gold award was similar except for a gold bullion wire background with black horizontal stripes. It featured a silver wash to the tank, instead of a black wash.

- Silver - presented for each tank destroyed.
- Gold - for five tanks destroyed.

One noted recipient was Günther Viezenz, who destroyed 21 enemy tanks.
