= Ernst Haeckel (general) =

German general (1890–1967)

Ernst Haeckel, a.k.a. Häckel (5 April 1890 in Gemünden am Main – 26 September 1967), was a German general who was awarded the Knights Cross of the Iron Cross.

After the end of the war, he contributed to military studies of the war for the American military, which are available at NARA:

- The Campaign in the Rhineland 15.9 - beginning Dec 44.
- 16th Infantry Division (June – September 13, 1944).

== Sources ==
- Scherzer, Veit (2007). Die Ritterkreuzträger 1939–1945 Die Inhaber des Ritterkreuzes des Eisernen Kreuzes 1939 von Heer, Luftwaffe, Kriegsmarine, Waffen-SS, Volkssturm sowie mit Deutschland verbündeter Streitkräfte nach den Unterlagen des Bundesarchives [The Knight's Cross Bearers 1939–1945 The Holders of the Knight's Cross of the Iron Cross 1939 by Army, Air Force, Navy, Waffen-SS, Volkssturm and Allied Forces with Germany According to the Documents of the Federal Archives] (in German). Jena, Germany: Scherzers Miltaer-Verlag. ISBN 978-3-938845-17-2.
