= 392nd (Croatian) Infantry Division =

- German: 392. (Kroatische) Infanterie-Division
- The badge worn on the right upper sleeve by members of the so-called "legionnaire" divisions
- Active: 17 August 1943 – 5 May 1945
- Country: Nazi Germany
- Allegiance: Nazi Germany; Independent State of Croatia
- Branch: Army
- Type: Infantry
- Role: Anti-Partisan operations
- Size: Division (c. 12,000)
- Nickname: Blue Division
- Engagements: World War II

Commanders
- Notable commanders: Johann Mickl

The 392nd (Croatian) Infantry Division (German: 392. (Kroatische) Infanterie-Division, Croatian: 392. (hrvatska) pješačka divizija) was a so-called "legionnaire" division of the German Army during World War II. It was formed in August 1943 using Croatian Home Guard soldiers with a German cadre. The division was commanded by Germans down to battalion and even company level in nearly all cases. Originally formed with the intention of service on the Eastern Front, this did not eventuate, and the division was used in anti-Partisan operations in the territory of the Independent State of Croatia (NDH) until the end of the war. It was commonly known as the Blue Division.

== History ==
=== Formation ===
After the Axis invasion of the Soviet Union in June 1941, Ante Pavelić, the leader of the newly created Axis puppet state the Independent State of Croatia (NDH), offered Adolf Hitler volunteers to serve on the Eastern Front. This offer soon resulted in the formation and deployment of army, air force and naval detachments which, after being trained and equipped by Germany, were committed to fighting the Red Army. The largest element was the 369th Croatian Reinforced Infantry Regiment, which was part of the 100th Jäger Division, but was decimated at Stalingrad in January 1943. The Croatian forces performed creditably on the Eastern Front, and the Germans continued to support the development of NDH forces with the aim of raising several divisions to serve there. Due to the lack of trained leaders and staff, these divisions were raised using a German cadre.

Commencing on 17 August 1943, the 392nd (Croatian) Infantry Division was assembled and trained in Austria as the third and last Croatian division raised for service in the Wehrmacht, following its sister divisions the 369th (Croatian) Infantry Division and 373rd (Croatian) Infantry Division. One infantry regiment and the divisional artillery regiment were formed in Döllersheim, the other infantry regiment in Zwettl, the signals battalion in Stockerau and the pioneer battalion in Krems. It was built around 3,500 German cadre troops, and 8,500 soldiers of the Croatian Home Guard, the regular army of the NDH. It was formed under the command of Generalmajor (Note: Equivalent to a U.S. Army brigadier general) Johann Mickl who remained its commander until the last weeks of the war. Mickl was an Austrian who had served under Erwin Rommel in France and North Africa, where he had been awarded the Knight's Cross of the Iron Cross. He had also commanded the 11th Panzer Division on the Eastern Front, where he had received the Oak Leaves to his Knight's Cross. The division wore Wehrmacht uniform with the coat-of-arms of the NDH on the right sleeve. Although originally intended for use on the Eastern Front, not long after its formation the Germans decided that the division would not be utilised outside the NDH. The division was deployed to the NDH in January 1944 to combat the Partisans in the territory of the puppet state. It was known as the "Blue Division" (German: Blaue Division, Croatian: Plava divizija).

=== Anti-Partisan operations ===
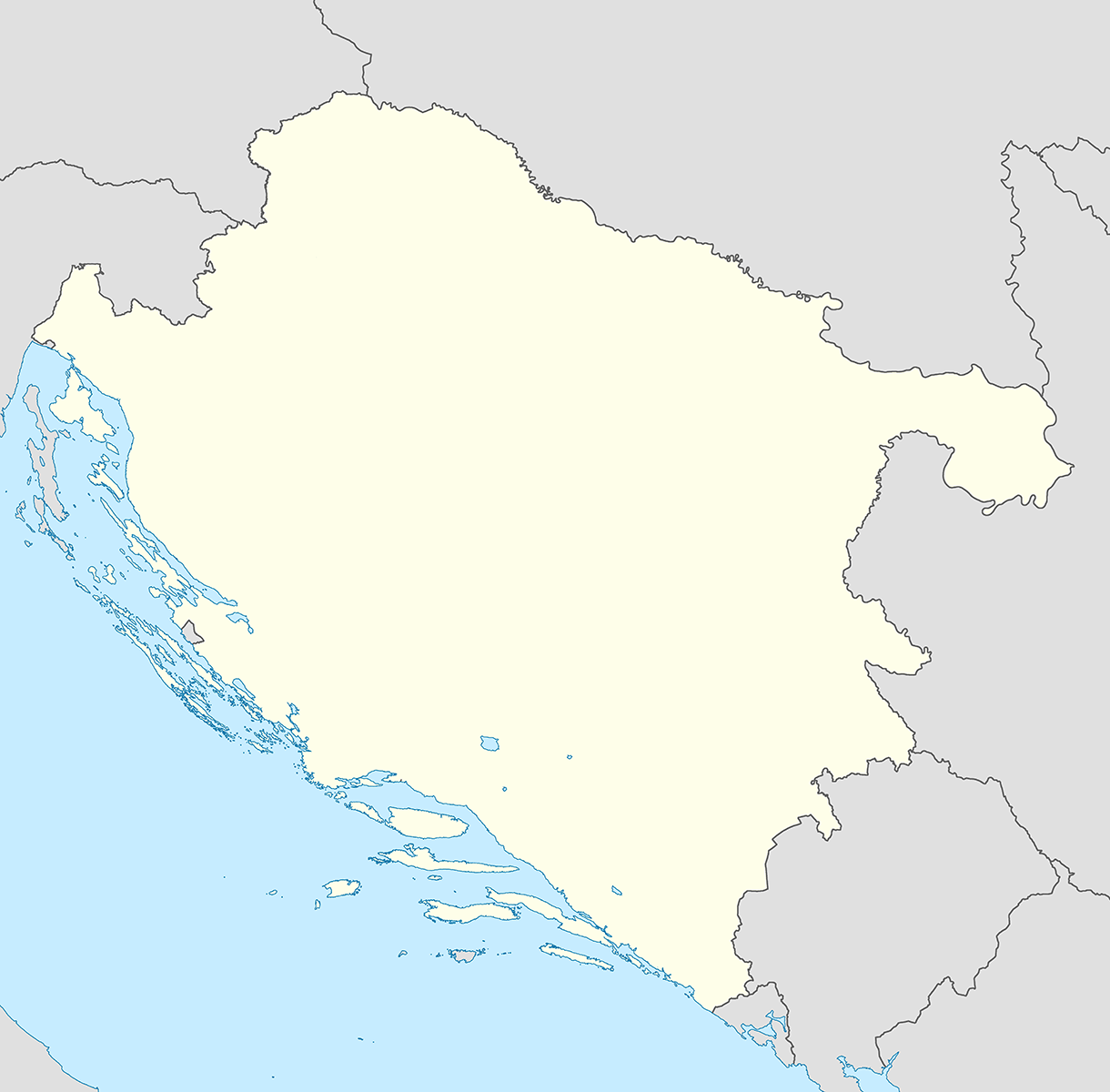
Map of the Independent State of Croatia showing length of the Adriatic coast that was included in the divisional area of responsibility, along with the divisional headquarters at Karlovac and the key northern Adriatic port of Senj

==== Initial deployment ====
The first task of the division after its arrival in the western part of the NDH was to secure the Adriatic coastline along the Croatian Littoral between Rijeka and Karlobag (including all islands except Krk) and about 60 kilometres (37 mi) inland, and was a critical task due to German fears of an Anglo-American landing on the Adriatic coast. This operation included securing the crucial supply route between Karlovac and Senj. These areas had been largely dominated by the Partisans since the Italian capitulation in autumn 1943, in particular the port of Senj. The division was placed under the command of the XV Mountain Corps as part of the 2nd Panzer Army, and was initially headquartered in Karlovac. The division also took over responsibility for the security of the Zagreb-Karlovac railway line from the 1st Cossack Division. The division was engaged by the Partisans from the first night in their garrison areas. Before the division had completed its initial deployment, it was called upon to relieve the NDH garrison of Ogulin. This involved a drive southwest from Karlovac between 13 and 16 January 1944 initially led by the 847th Infantry Regiment. In the first engagements with Partisan units, the Croatian soldiers panicked and their German leaders were quickly wounded or killed. When the bodies of those that had been killed were recovered, they were often found stripped of equipment and some were even found naked. On 16 January, Ogulin was relieved, but the advance was continued south to Skradnik, and villages in that area were also secured.

==== Operational history ====
This was followed by Operation Drežnica, a push through to the coast, forcing passes through the Velika Kapela mountain range, part of the Dinaric Alps. Both passes were more than 750 metres (2,460 ft) above sea level and the snow was often knee or thigh-deep. Delayed by mines and roadblocks, the division captured the Kapela and Vratnik passes with minimal casualties. This was followed by a series of engagements along the road to the coast, and after some close quarter fighting with the Partisan 13th Assault Division, they captured and destroyed most of that division's supply dump northwest of Lokve and secured Senj. The 847th Infantry Regiment was then allocated the task of securing the coastline and the 846th Infantry Regiment was directed to secure the divisional main supply route from Senj to Generalski Stol. They started improved bases along the road, including Italian forts that had been established in the Kapela and Vratnik passes. The 847th Infantry Regiment spread out along the coastline between Karlobag and Crikvenica, and supported by elements of the divisional artillery and pioneers they began building fortifications against a feared Allied invasion. The troops in Karlobag linked up with the 264th Infantry Division which was responsible for the coast further to the southeast. The supply situation quickly became difficult due to Partisan interdiction of the route from Karlovac and Allied bombing of coastal shipping and Senj harbour. In late February or early March the 847th Regiment, supported by an Ustaše battalion, advanced on Plaški (south of Ogulin) when they were stopped by deep snow. Partisans then attacked their supply lines, killing 30 soldiers. Some of the bodies of the dead soldiers were looted or mutilated. After Plaški was captured, the Ustaše battalion independently pursued the Partisans and returned to Plaški with many of the looted items.

In March, the 847th Regiment occupied the Adriatic islands of Rab and Pag without encountering any Partisan resistance. In the same month, the 846th Regiment conducted an operation in the Gacka river valley around Otočac, and assisted the Croatian Home Guard in enforcing conscription orders on their own population in the divisional area. Through the spring of 1944, the 846th Regiment used jadgkommandos, lightly armed and mobile "hunter teams" of company or battalion strength, to conduct follow-up of sightings of Partisans, and transport moving through the Kapela Pass had to travel in convoy for security. The division was able to restore a land connection with the NDH garrison of Gospić which had been reliant on supply from the sea since the Italian surrender, and drove three Partisan battalions out of the outskirts of Otočac. One of the difficulties faced by the division in fighting in the mountains was the lack of mountain artillery which could accompany the battalions in the field. The divisional artillery was equipped with field howitzers with a range of 12 kilometres (7.5 mi) which seriously limited the artillery cover that could be provided during mobile operations.

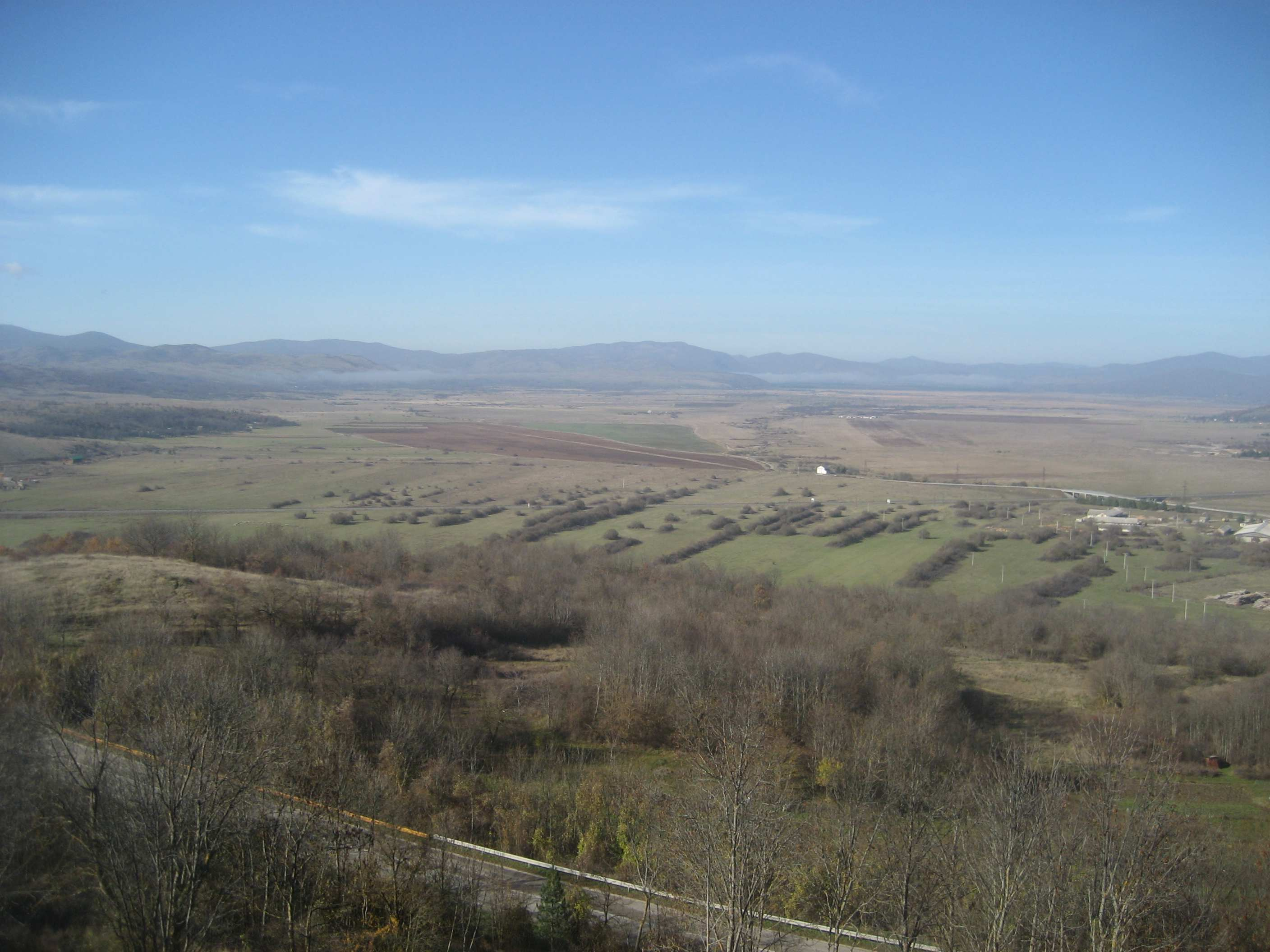
Operation Morgenstern was carried out to clear the Krbavsko polje region of Partisans

In April 1944, Mickl was promoted to Generalleutnant. (Note: Equivalent to a U.S. Army major general) The Germans identified that the Partisan 13th Assault Division was using the Drežnica valley as a huge armoury, hiding captured Italian arms and ammunition in villages, basements, and even in fake graves in cemeteries. This was of major concern if the feared Allied landing eventuated. In mid-April, Mickl ordered Operation Keulenschlag (Mace Blow) to clear the area, using the 846th Infantry Regiment and parts of the 847th Infantry Regiment, supported by the divisional artillery and flak battalion. Over the next two weeks, the division pushed the 13th Assault Division north to the area of Mrkopalj and Delnice, and captured sufficient material to equip two divisions, including 30 tonnes (30 long tons; 33 short tons) of small arms ammunition and 15 tonnes (15 long tons; 17 short tons) of artillery ammunition.

On 5 May, the Partisan 35th Lika Division attacked from the Plitvice Lakes area and captured the village of Ramljane. Partisans also interdicted the Otočac-Gospić road. In response, Mickl planned Operation Morgenstern (Morning Star) to clear Partisan forces from the Krbavsko Polje region around Udbina. From 7 to 16 May 1944, along with elements of the 373rd (Croatian) Infantry Division, the 92nd Motorised Regiment, a battalion of the 1st Regiment of the Brandenburg Division, and Ustaše units, the division was involved in Operation Morgenstern. According to German sources, Operation Morgenstern resulted in significant Partisan losses, including 438 killed, 56 captured, and 18 defectors, as well as capturing weapons, ammunition, vehicles, animals and large amounts of equipment. Also in May, the division received 500 German reinforcements, and formed a field replacement battalion. The division saw action against the Partisans until the end of the war, often fighting alongside a grouping of Ustaše units that numbered up to 12,000 troops.

==== Final months ====
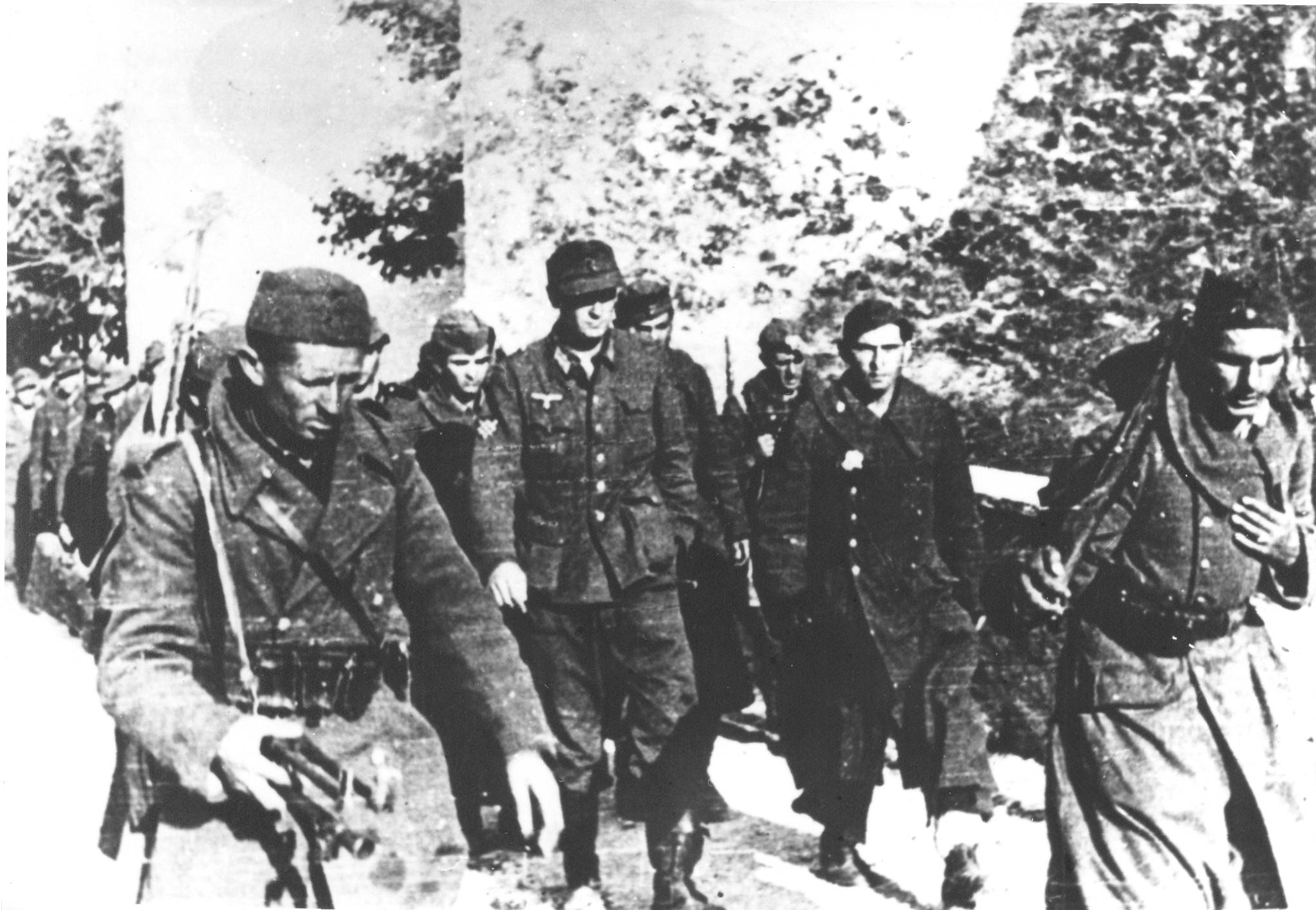
Captured soldiers of the 392th Division, escorted by men of the 20th Dalmatian Division near Sušak, Slovenia c. 1945

During the last few months of the war, the division was engaged in the defence of the northern Adriatic coast and Lika. Mickl was shot in the head by Partisans near Senj on 9 April 1945, and died in hospital in Rijeka the following day. The task of the division was to fight the Partisan 4th Army advancing from the south-east, and to support the LXXXXVII Army Corps, consisting of the 188th Mountain Division and 237th Infantry Divisions, which were in danger of being enveloped near Rijeka. The division arrived in the area of Rijeka in mid-April 1945 after it suffered losses in the Lika-Primorje operation. However, by April 1945 the Croatian manpower of the division had been significantly reduced due to desertions or release. Around this time, about 3,000 Croats were released, leaving a small number of Croats remaining with the division.

Some of the released Croats apparently succeeded in travelling to the Slovene Littoral in the closing days of the war. They were then organised as a separate unit of the largely illusory remnant of the Armed Forces of the Independent State of Croatia under the command of General Matija Parac, which was formally part of General Draža Mihailović's Chetniks. The unit was under the direct command of General Miodrag Damjanović. Later the unit retreated to British-occupied northern Italy.

The division, including its few remaining Croats were ordered to move north towards Klagenfurt in Austria. Some of the remaining Croat members of the division were killed while the LXXXXVII Army Corps attempted to push through, but the formation lacked the strength to achieve its objective. As a result, on 5 May 1945, Generaloberst (Note: Equivalent to a U.S. Army general) Alexander Löhr, Commander-in-chief Southeast Europe, authorised the LXXXXVII Army Corps, including the 392nd Division, to surrender. The Partisans accepted the German surrender on 7 May in the area between Rijeka and Ilirska Bistrica, at which time all the remaining Croats and some Italian fascist troops still fighting alongside the Germans within the Corps were released. For several days the disarmed German troops of the Corps were allowed to travel towards Germany, but on 12 May the Partisans decided to make them prisoners of war.

=== Postwar ===
Following the division's surrender many of its members, including all German personnel, were murdered. On 3 April 2009, the Croatian Helsinki Committee for Human Rights announced that mass graves containing the remains of approximately 4,500 members of the division had been discovered near Zaprešić. Locals indicated that the Partisan 21st Serbian Division was responsible for the massacre.

== Order of battle ==
The division included the following principal units:

- 846th Infantry Regiment (I, II, III battalions)
- 847th Infantry Regiment (I, II, III battalions)
- 392nd Reconnaissance Battalion
- 392nd Panzerjäger (Anti-tank) Battalion
- 392nd Artillery Regiment (I, II battalions)
- 392nd Pioneer Battalion
- 392nd Signals Battalion

== See also ==
- Resistance during World War II
- Anti-partisan operations in World War II
