= Johann Mickl =

Austrian-born army officer and division commander

- Born: 18 April 1893; Radkersburg, Austro-Hungarian Empire
- Died: 10 April 1945 (aged 51); Fiume, Italian Social Republic
- Military career
- Allegiance: Austria-Hungary (1908–1918); (Austria) First Austrian Republic (1919–1934); Federal State of Austria (1934–1938); Germany (1938–1945)
- Branch: Imperial-Royal Landwehr (Austria-Hungary); Austrian Army; German Army
- Service years: 1908–1918 (Austria-Hungary); 1919–1938 (Austria); 1938–1945 (Germany)
- Rank: Generalleutnant
- Commands: 90th Light Infantry Division; 11th Panzer Division; 392nd (Croatian) Infantry Division
- Conflicts: World War I; World War II; Invasion of Poland; Battle of France; North African Campaign; Eastern Front; World War II in Yugoslavia
- Awards: Knight's Cross of the Iron Cross with Oak Leaves (Nazi Germany); Military Merit Medal for Bravery in Silver and bar (Austria-Hungary)

Johann Mickl (18 April 1893 – 10 April 1945) was an Austrian-born army officer and division commander who served Nazi Germany during World War II. Reaching the rank of general (Generalleutnant), he was one of only 882 recipients of the Knight's Cross of the Iron Cross with Oak Leaves. He was commissioned shortly before the outbreak of World War I, and served with Austro-Hungarian forces on the Eastern and Italian Fronts as a junior officer in the Imperial-Royal Mountain Troops. During World War I he was decorated several times for bravery and leadership and was wounded on four occasions.

Immediately after the war, Mikl served in the Volkswehr militia which was formed to resist the incorporation of his home town of Radkersburg into the newly created Kingdom of Serbs, Croats and Slovenes. He served with the Austrian Army from 1920 until the Anschluss in 1938, when it was absorbed by the Wehrmacht, and he transferred to the German Army as an Oberstleutnant. He commanded an anti-tank battalion during the invasion of Poland and Battle of France. Mickl was then transferred to North African theatre of operations to command a rifle regiment. He was awarded the Knight's Cross of the Iron Cross for his leadership of a battle group during the British Operation Crusader.

He briefly commanded the 90th Light Division in late 1941 before being wounded. After he recovered he was sent to the Eastern Front. Mickl commanded the 12th Rifle Brigade of the 12th Panzer Division in the east, taking over the 25th Panzergrenadier Regiment when his brigade headquarters was disestablished. Transferred to the Führerreserve, he was promoted to Generalmajor, and received the Oak Leaves to his Knight's Cross of the Iron Cross for his leadership during the Soviet 1942–1943 winter offensives, as part of the Battles of Rzhev. He then commanded the 11th Panzer Division during the Battle of Kursk. Later in 1943, he was appointed to train and command the 392nd (Croatian) Infantry Division, and led it in fighting against the Yugoslav Partisans before dying of wounds inflicted in the last month of the war. In 1967, the Austrian Armed Forces barracks in Bad Radkersburg was named after him.

== Early life and education ==
Mickl was born Johann Mikl in Zelting, Radkersburg, which was part of the Duchy of Styria within the Austro-Hungarian Empire. His father Mathias was a German farmer from Terbegofzen, and his mother Maria (née Dervarič), was from Zelting, and of at least partially Slovene heritage. Mikl had a twin brother, Alois, who was killed in action in 1915 in Galicia near Lemberg, present-day Lviv in Ukraine. As a child, Mikl spoke German, Slovene and Hungarian, and remained fluent in all three throughout his life.

After entering a cadet school in Vienna in the Imperial-Royal Landwehr in 1908, he was accepted at the Theresian Military Academy in Wiener Neustadt in 1911. Described as slim, muscular, and 1.92 metres (6 ft 4 in) tall, Mikl graduated on 1 August 1914 and was posted to the recently mobilised 4th Imperial-Royal Landwehr Infantry Regiment (LIR 4), which formed part of the Imperial-Royal Mountain Troops.

== World War I ==
LIR 4 was a purely Carinthian regiment, and wore the mountain cap (German: Bergmütze) and the Edelweiss badge. As part of the 22nd Rifle Division of the III Corps, Mikl's unit arrived at the area of Zolochiv, Galicia to take up a position on the Zolota Lypa River. Mikl was wounded in the first battle, on 26 August 1914; he was shot in the chest. He spent time in a military hospital and was then employed in the regimental replacement battalion as an instructor until 15 April 1915. On 2 June 1915, LIR 4 received orders to join the fighting in the Kolomyia region, where the Russian army launched an offensive and the Austrians suffered serious reverses. Mikl's company formed the regimental rear guard during the withdrawal from the Pruth river on 3 June. For his actions and "demonstrated personal bravery", Mikl was awarded the Military Merit Cross 3rd Class with War Decoration (German: Militärverdienstkreuz III. Klasse und Kriegsdekoration).

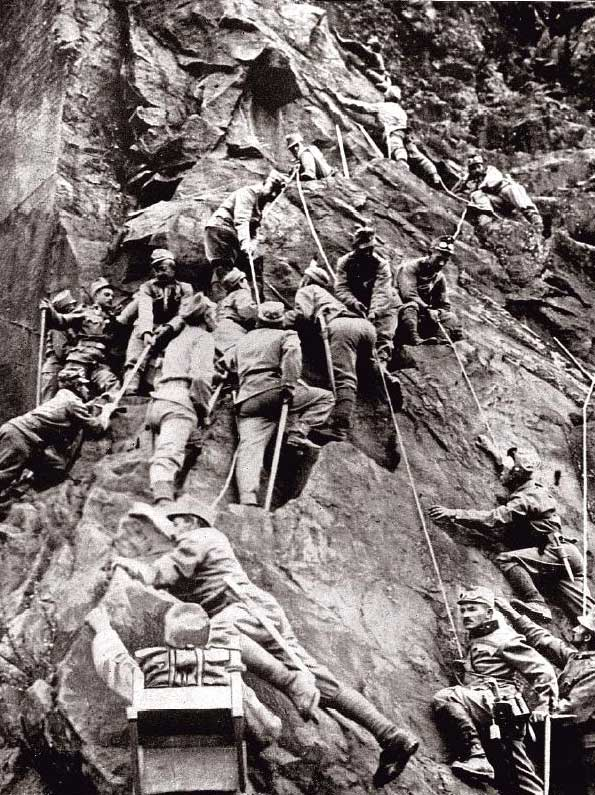
Austro-Hungarian mountain troops scaling a rock face in 1915

By late September 1915, LIR 4 had been transferred to the Bovec valley in the Julian Alps on the Southern Front, and Mikl had been promoted to Oberleutnant (first lieutenant) and placed in command of the 2nd Company. A fairly quiet winter followed, during which the Austrians undertook reconnaissance of the Royal Italian Army positions. In August 1915, Italian Alpini troops had captured an advanced position about 1 kilometre (0.62 mi) southwest of the 2,208 m (7,244 ft) Rombongipfels peak, on a rocky outcrop called Cuklahöhe. From this position the Italians overlooked the positions of the 44th Rifle Division and its rear areas, which made movement almost impossible. Mikl's company was among the two companies tasked with capturing the Cuklahöhe, which the two units accomplished. For his leadership of the assault on the Cuklahöhe, Mikl was awarded the Order of the Iron Crown 3rd Class.

In April 1916, Mikl's regiment was deployed to South Tyrol to take part in the Austrian spring offensive, during which he was awarded the bronze Military Merit Medal on the ribbon of the Bravery Medal with War Decoration, for leading a successful attack on an Italian position on Monte Cengio. At the end of June, the parent regiment was transferred back to Galicia to reinforce the Austro-Hungarian forces being hard-pressed by the Russian Brusilov Offensive, and then returned to the Southern Front where it remained until the late autumn 1917, fighting in the 8th, 9th, 10th and 11th Battles of the Isonzo. During the Eighth Battle of the Isonzo on 10 October 1916, Mikl was wounded and hospitalised. When he recovered, he was assigned to the regimental replacement battalion until spring 1917 and later was employed as an instructor at an officer's school. In January 1917, he was awarded the silver Military Merit Medal on the ribbon of the Bravery Medal with War Decoration. In August 1917, Mikl was appointed to command a machine gun company, and served in the Battle of Caporetto and the subsequent advance to the Piave river. For his leadership in an assault river crossing, Mikl was awarded a bar to his silver Military Merit Medal. On 15 May 1918, Mikl began a preparatory course for future attendance at the War College in Vienna, and when the war ended he was posted to the 54th Rifle Division in Galicia.

== Between the wars ==
The states that would succeed Austria-Hungary were approved by the Allies on 28 October 1918, and the dual monarchy of Austria-Hungary was dissolved three days later. Many new nation states emerged in the territory formerly belonging to the empire, as nationalist movements called for greater autonomy or full independence. The Duchy of Styria was divided between the new states of Republic of German-Austria and the Kingdom of Serbs, Croats and Slovenes, but the exact line of the new border was unclear. In November 1918, Mikl had returned to his hometown of Radkersburg, an important railway junction point, which was of economic importance to both sides. The Slovenes occupied the city on 1 December 1918. In 1919, Mikl served as adjutant in the 1st Battalion of the Volkswehr militia, which used arms provided by the provincial government of Carinthia to make an unsuccessful attempt to recapture Radkersburg from forces of the Kingdom of Serbs, Croats and Slovenes. The provincial government of Styria, which had not supported these actions, subsequently issued a warrant ordering Mikl's arrest for treason. When the Treaty of Saint-Germain-en-Laye was signed later in 1919, Radkersburg was retained within what became the First Austrian Republic.

In 1920, Mikl was accepted by the new Austrian Army (German: Bundesheer), joining the 11th Alpenjäger Regiment. During 1920–21 he was rapidly promoted to Hauptmann (captain), and on 20 October 1920 he was posted to the 5th Cyclist Battalion in Villach, Carinthia. In 1921, his battalion was deployed to Burgenland to assist in the transfer of that region from Hungary to Austria. In 1922, he changed his name to the more Germanised Mickl. On 2 May 1922, Mickl married Helene Zischka in Klagenfurt; their only child, Manfred, was born in 1923. That same year, he was promoted to the rank of Major.

In 1925, Mickl passed the examinations for the general staff. On 26 July 1930, Mickl was appointed an honorary citizen of the town of Radkersburg. After fifteen years with the 5th Cyclist Battalion, in 1934, Mickl briefly served on the military headquarters for Carinthia in Klagenfurt. In February of the following year, he was posted to the headquarters of the 3rd Brigade at Sankt Pölten. His promotion to Oberstleutnant (lieutenant colonel) followed in 1936. In the same year, Mickl's son Manfred entered the military cadet school at Enns. On 14 March 1938, following the Anschluss, Mickl was absorbed at his rank into the German Army, but as a troop officer, not a general staff officer. From 12 May to mid-August 1938, he attended training at the Panzertruppenschule II (Armoured Troops School No. 2) in Wünsdorf south of Berlin, before being given command of the 42nd Panzerjäger (Anti-tank) Battalion of the 2nd Light Division. Helene soon moved to Gera in Thuringia to join Mickl, leaving the 15-year-old Manfred at the cadet school until his graduation.

== World War II ==
=== Invasions of Poland and France ===
Mickl commanded the 42nd Panzerjäger Battalion of Generall Georg Stumme's 2nd Light Division during the September 1939 invasion of Poland, during which the division was involved in difficult fighting through Kielce and Radom in central Poland to Modlin on the Vistula. The following month, Mickl was awarded the Iron Cross 2nd Class. During the winter of 1939/40, the 2nd Light Division was reclassified and converted into the 7th Panzer Division, in preparation for the invasion of France and the Low Countries. In February 1940, General Erwin Rommel arrived to take command of the division.

Mickl remained in charge of the 42nd Panzerjäger Battalion during the invasion. Mickl's battalion fought well but suffered serious casualties during the Battle of Arras on 21 May while trying to stop the heavily armoured tanks of the British 1st Army Tank Brigade with its 37 mm anti-tank guns. His soldiers derided their guns as Panzeranklopfgerät (tank-door knocker), due to their failure to penetrate the British Matilda I and Matilda II tanks. Mickl's battalion tried to protect the exposed flank of the division, but was overrun. The situation was saved by anti-aircraft guns and field artillery which were able to knock out the British tanks with direct fire.

On 1 June, Mickl was promoted to Oberst and on 21 June awarded him the Iron Cross 1st Class. After the French surrender, Mickl was attached to the division's 25th Panzer Regiment, and on 10 December 1940 was appointed to command the 7th Rifle Regiment of the division. Mickl remained in command of the 7th Rifle Regiment during occupation duties in southwestern France, redeployment to Germany, and during the division's preparation for the invasion of the Soviet Union. In May 1941, Mickl was posted to a new role in Germany, raising the headquarters of the 155th Rifle Regiment for service in North Africa. The 155th Rifle Regiment was to be a motorised formation of three battalions, one drawn from each of the 106th, 112th and 113th Infantry Divisions.

=== North Africa ===
In August 1941, Panzer Group Afrika was raised, and the newly promoted General der Panzertruppe Rommel was placed in command. The Afrika Korps was assigned to Generalleutnant Ludwig Crüwell. Soon after, Mickl followed the battalions of his regiment to North Africa, arriving there in early September 1941. He found them to be under-equipped, having been furnished with only a few vehicles and only two 37 mm anti-tank guns per battalion. He considered that this would be sufficient for an attack on defensive positions, but completely inadequate for mobile operations. On 6 September, his regiment joined the Siege of Tobruk taking up positions at Ras el Mdauuar until the end of October, when it became part of the composite Afrika (Special Purpose) Division and prepared for an attack on the fortress. When a strong British reconnaissance force was reported far to the south, moving west from the Egyptian border at Sidi Omar, Mickl was placed in command of a battle group which was sent to stop the British. The force consisted of Mickl's regiment, along with the 361st Afrika Regiment and the 605th Panzerjäger Battalion. The Afrika Regiment had only just arrived in theatre, and had no heavy weapons, insufficient ammunition and almost no vehicles.

By the following day, Mickl's group was deployed on the high ground on either side of the airfield at Sidi Rezegh. That afternoon, British armoured cars and tanks appeared, and Mickl's force was hard-pressed to hold its positions barring the British approach to Tobruk from the south and south-east, as little tank support was available. In the face of a superior force, Mickl's kampfgruppe fought hard in what became known as the Battle of Sidi Rezegh. Mickl and around 800 of his troops were captured by elements of the New Zealand Division on 26 November 1941, the captured troops being mainly from the Afrika Regiment. Mickl and the POWs and were freed by the advancing German troops.

When the commander of the newly renamed 90th Light Afrika Division, Generalmajor Max Sümmermann, was killed in an Allied air raid on 10 December 1941, Mickl was appointed to temporarily command the division. During December, Mickl was wounded in the head and hand, but remained at his post. Rommel recommended Mickl for the Knight's Cross of the Iron Cross, for his leadership at Sidi Rezegh, and it was awarded on 13 December 1941. At the end of December Mickl was sent home on convalescent leave.

=== Eastern Front ===
==== 12th Rifle Brigade ====
On 25 March 1942, Mickl was appointed to command the 12th Rifle Brigade of Generalmajor Walter Wessel's 12th Panzer Division on the Eastern Front. The division was the main reserve formation of Army Group North, and when Mickl joined his brigade headquarters it was located on the coast near Narva west of Leningrad. The 12th Rifle Brigade consisted of the 5th and 25th Motorised Infantry Regiments. As a subordinate formation of General Georg Lindemann's 18th Army, during the Red Army's Winter Campaign of 1941–42 it had fought on the Volkhov Front, during which the Soviet Lyuban Offensive Operation had penetrated deep into its area of operations in an attempt to relieve Leningrad. When Mickl arrived to take command, elements of his command were fighting as part of a total of twenty 18th Army battle groups engaged in encircling and destroying cut-off Soviet units. It was not until May that Mickl was able to start gather his brigade together. At the end of June, Mickl he received news that his son Manfred had been seriously wounded in the leg during the Axis capture of Tobruk. (In 1944, Manfred and his fiancée were both killed in an air raid in Vienna.)

By 17 July, the 12th Panzer Division was finally concentrating near Mga, 60 kilometres (37 mi) south-east of Leningrad, and Mickl's brigade was reclassified as a Panzergrenadier (mechanised infantry) brigade, mostly on paper. Between 25 August and 16 September, Mickl visited Manfred in hospital in Naples while on leave, but he returned to find that his brigade had again been parceled out in battle groups used as "fire brigades" along the Neva River. He and his staff were usually bypassed by the division commander and staff. By October, it had become apparent that Mickl's brigade headquarters was being not employed as originally intended, and along with the brigade staff of all Panzer divisions, it was disestablished.

==== 25th Panzergrenadier Regiment ====
Without a command, Mickl remained with the 12th Panzer Division, taking over the 25th Panzergrenadier Regiment, whose commander had fallen ill. In the new area, Mickl concentrated on training and getting to know his men, before conducting an anti-partisan operation named Affenkäfig (Monkey Cage) between 11 and 14 November 1942. Lacking experience in counter-insurgency, the regiment achieved little. Mickl then concentrated his troops' efforts on securing winter quarters and building shelters for the regiment's vehicles. On the frontlines, 200 kilometres (120 mi) east of Nevel, Soviet forces were threatening to break through around the Rzhev salient and encircle the German 9th Army, and on 21 November the 12th Panzer Division received orders to march for the front. The march east, undertaken in freezing conditions and heavy snow, was very difficult. The men lit small stoves in the rear of the trucks to keep warm, and often had to clear the snow-clogged roads with shovels.

Initially they were ordered to Roslavl, south-east of Smolensk, but this was soon changed to Yelnya, east of Smolensk. When they reached Smolensk, they marched on through Yartsevo to Safonovo before being ordered to turn north towards Bely to help stop a Soviet breakthrough south of Rzhev. At the head of the division, the 25th Panzergrenadier Regiment attacked off the route of march towards elements of the 1st Panzer Division holding out around the village of Komary. The fighting continued in snowstorms and extreme cold until 16 December, with Mickl forward directing the battle, which ended with the destruction of eight Soviet tank and rifle brigades in the Bely area. After a few days rest, on 23 December Mickl's regiment marched to the north-east of Bely to stop Soviet forces moving into the Luchesa river valley. In the difficult terrain and weather conditions, the regiment was exhausted from constant fighting over hamlets that often changed hands. On 30 December, the fighting escalated as the Red Army forces in the sector were reinforced, and Mickl's II Battalion was forced to temporarily withdraw into the surrounding forest. Fierce fighting continued until the 12th Panzer Division was detached at short notice on 14 January 1943, but not before the divisional staff had reported Mickl's brave leadership in the fighting to the Oberkommando des Heeres (German Army High Command). On 16 January 1943, the division was on the move, this time headed north-west to Velikiye Luki, but its move to the front was countermanded.

==== Führerreserve ====
On 26 January 1943, Mickl received orders to report to Berlin on 2 February. In a formal assessment on 20 November 1942, Wessel had assessed Mickl as having the aptitude to command a Panzer division, and he supplemented this on 28 January, extolling his "almost unparalleled bravery and boldness" in command of the 25th Panzergrenadier Regiment. On 30 January, Mickl arrived in Gera on leave to visit his wife Helene, and spent the next three months in the Army Headquarters officers' reserve pool (German: Oberkommando des Heeres Führerreserve).

On 1 March he was promoted to Generalmajor, and five days later he became the 205th recipient of the Oak Leaves to the Knight's Cross of the Iron Cross, in recognition of his outstanding commitment as the commander of the 25th Panzergrenadier Regiment during winter 1942–43. During his time in the Führerreserve, he also met with his mentor Rommel, now a Generalfeldmarschall, and he also attended a course for divisional commanders, which he referred to as a "fool's course". In early May, Mickl was summoned to Berlin and assigned to the command of the 11th Panzer Division during the absence of Generalleutnant Dietrich von Choltitz, who had been suffering with heart problems. Despite the good news of being appointed to a divisional command, Mickl expressed his disappointment that he was being allocated a division in need of re-organisation, rather than a fully equipped and full-strength modern division.

==== 11th Panzer Division ====
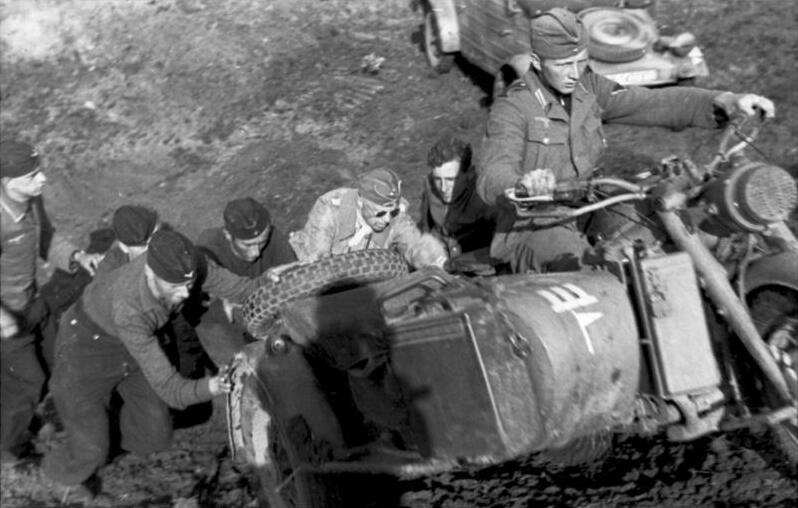
Mickl (in sunglasses) assists in pushing an 11th Panzer Division motorcycle up a hillside in the Soviet Union

When Mickl took command, the 11th Panzer Division had not yet finished rebuilding after suffering serious losses during the December 1942 Operation Winter Storm, the attempted relief of German forces encircled at Stalingrad and during the Third Battle of Kharkov in February and March 1943. The 11th Panzer Division formed part of General Otto von Knobelsdorff's XLVIII Panzer Corps under the operation control of Generaloberst Hermann Hoth's 4th Panzer Army, which was itself a component of Field Marshal Erich von Manstein's Army Group South.

For the main assault, Army Group South was the southern pincer of a manoeuvre aimed at cutting off all Red Army forces within the Kursk salient. It was to attack north out of the areas west of Belgorod, and link up with Field Marshal Günther von Kluge's Army Group Centre, which was to attack south from the Orel region. On the afternoon of 4 July, the successfully conducted a preliminary operation to breach minefields and secure the heights overlooking the nearly 40 kilometres (25 mi) deep Soviet defensive positions near Kursk, which were essentially a series of staggered defensive positions and minefields reinforced with anti-tank weapons.

Mickl's division achieved its objectives during the preliminary operation, and commenced its main assault at 06:00 on 5 July. The 11th Panzer Division advanced on the right flank of the XLVIII Panzer Corps, and on the left of the powerful Panzergrenadier Division Großdeutschland. Its progress was hampered by minimal air support, difficult terrain and constant Soviet counterattacks. Fighting alongside a Panzerkampfgruppe of the Großdeutschland Division, it had captured the heavily fortified village of Cherkasskoye. By the evening of 6 July, XLVIII Panzer Corps had breached the first belt of the formidable Soviet defences, and Mickl's division had reached the Pena river north and northeast of Cherkasskoye. This was 40 kilometres (25 mi) short of the objective Hoth had set for 6 July, the bridge over the Psel River at Oboyan.

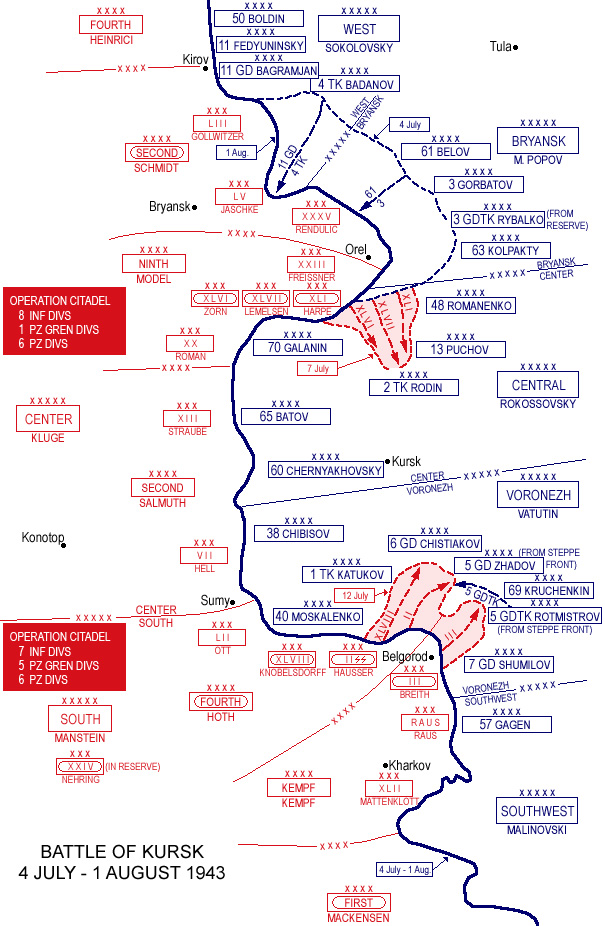
The Battle of Kursk, during which Mickl's division gained the northernmost penetration into the Soviet defences

XLVIII Panzer Corps regrouped during the night of 6/7 July, and the 11th Panzer Division continued its advance towards Oboyan on 7 July, alongside the Großdeutschland Division. Over the next few days, the two divisions overcame resistance from a series of Soviet strongpoints, along with their desperate counterattacks. By 10 July they had reached a position east of the Kursk-Kharkov road, on the heights 2 kilometres (1.2 mi) south of Oboyan, having defeated advanced elements of the Soviet 10th Tank Corps. At this point the previously rough terrain opened up, and with the aid of binoculars the men of the division could see the vast plain behind Oboyan in which the two pincers of Operation Citadel were planned to meet. But the northern pincer had been stalled north of Kursk in heavy fighting, and the 11th Panzer Division had gained the most northern penetration into the Soviet salient achieved by Army Group South during the operation.

Twice in the next few days, XLVIII Panzer Corps attempted to punch through the Soviet defences to the north, while to the east the II SS Panzer Corps and German Army Detachment Kempf fought the tanks of the Soviet Steppe Front. The 11th Panzer Division was then ordered to attack towards the upper reaches of the Psel, some 30 kilometres (19 mi) to the east, followed by the Großdeutschland Division once it had captured Oboyan. The two divisions were then to link up with the II SS Panzer Corps and defeat the Soviet forces concentrated around Prokhorovka. On 17 July, these orders were cancelled, and over the next week, Mickl's division fought defensive battles against the Red Army, and conflict arose with his subordinate commanders and his key staff, who did not support his style of leadership, which was modelled on that of his mentor Rommel. For nearly that whole week, Mickl's division bore the brunt of the Soviet attacks on the XLVIII Panzer Corps.

On 21 July, Mickl wrote a letter in which he stated that he wished to again be a battalion or regimental commander, so as to not have to deal with such a large frontline. That day he had been told that the next day he should expect Choltitz to return and take over command, but instead he spent a further three weeks commanding the 11th Panzer Division in heavy fighting against Soviet attacks. Finally, on 12 August he received a message advising that he was to be relieved by Generalmajor Wend von Wietersheim, who arrived that same day. Four days later, Mickl returned to Gera, disappointed and resentful about the demotion, as he felt that he had made a good enough impression during the fighting to be retained as commander of the division. The reason behind his relief is unclear. His performance commanding the division had not been markedly worse than comparable divisional commanders during the preceding battles, and it is possible that Wehrmacht or Army Headquarters had decided Mickl was better suited to fighting insurgents in his native Balkans, especially given his fluency in several local languages.

=== Yugoslavia ===
==== A new division ====
After three weeks leave, Mickl was sent to Austria to train and command the 392nd (Croatian) Infantry Division. He was appointed to this command on 13 August 1943. Commencing from 17 August, the 392nd was assembled and trained in Austria as the third and last Croatian division raised for service in the Wehrmacht, following its sister divisions the 369th and the 373rd. It was built around a cadre of 3,500 German officers, NCOs and specialists, and 8,500 soldiers of the Croatian Home Guard, the regular army of the Independent State of Croatia (Croatian: Nezavisna Država Hrvatska, NDH). The division was commanded by Germans down to battalion and even company level in nearly all cases, and was commonly referred to as a "legionnaire division". Although originally intended for use on the Eastern Front, not long after its formation the Germans decided that the division would not be utilised outside the NDH.

==== Initial clearing operations ====
The division was deployed to the NDH by rail between 5 and 10 January 1944, to participate in the Nazi security warfare in the western parts of the puppet state. It became known as the "Blue Division" (German: Blaue Division, Croatian: Plava divizija), Mickl's task was focused on securing the Adriatic coastline along the Croatian Littoral between Fiume and Karlobag (including all islands except Krk) and about 60 km (37 mi) inland. This task included securing the crucial supply route between Karlovac and Senj. These areas, and in particular the port of Senj, had been largely dominated by the Yugoslav Partisans since the Italian capitulation in autumn 1943. Mickl's division was placed under the command of the XV Mountain Corps as part of the 2nd Panzer Army, with its headquarters to be established in Karlovac. The division was also to take over responsibility for the security of the Zagreb–Karlovac railway line from the 1st Cossack Division.

The planned attack against Partisan forces besieging the NDH garrison at Ogulin near Karlovac involved a drive southwest from Karlovac between 13 and 16 January 1944 initially led by the 847th Infantry Regiment. In their first engagements with the Partisan 8th Division, the Croatian soldiers panicked and their German leaders were quickly wounded or killed. On 16 January, Ogulin was relieved, but the advance was continued south to Skradnik, and villages in that area were also secured.

This was followed by Operation Drežnica, a push through to the coast, forcing passes through the Velika Kapela mountain range, part of the Dinaric Alps. Both passes were more than 750 metres (2,460 ft) above sea level. The division captured the Kapela and Vratnik passes. This was followed by a series of engagements along the road to the coast. The 847th Infantry Regiment was then allocated the task of securing the coastline up the coast as far as Bakar, and southward to the village of Jablanac, and the 846th Infantry Regiment was directed to secure the divisional supply route from Senj to Generalski Stol. The 847th Infantry Regiment then spread out along the coastline between Karlobag and Crikvenica, and supported by elements of the divisional artillery and pioneers they began building fortifications against a feared Allied invasion. The troops in Karlobag linked up with the 264th Infantry Division who were responsible for the coast further to the southeast.

==== Fighting during 1944 ====
In late February or early March the 847th Infantry Regiment, supported by an Ustaše battalion, advanced on Plaški (south of Ogulin) when they were stopped by deep snow. Partisans then attacked their supply lines, killing 30 soldiers. In March, the 847th Regiment occupied the Adriatic islands of Rab and Pag without encountering any Partisan resistance. In the same month, the 846th Regiment conducted an operation in the Gacka river valley around Otočac, and assisted the Croatian Home Guard in enforcing conscription orders on their own population in the divisional area. Through the spring of 1944, the 846th Regiment used Jadgkommandos, lightly armed and mobile "hunter teams" of company or battalion strength, to conduct follow-up of sightings of Partisans, and transport moving through the Kapela Pass had to travel in convoy for security. The division was able to restore a land connection with the NDH garrison of Gospić which had been reliant on supply from the sea since the Italian surrender, and drove three Partisan battalions out of the outskirts of Otočac.

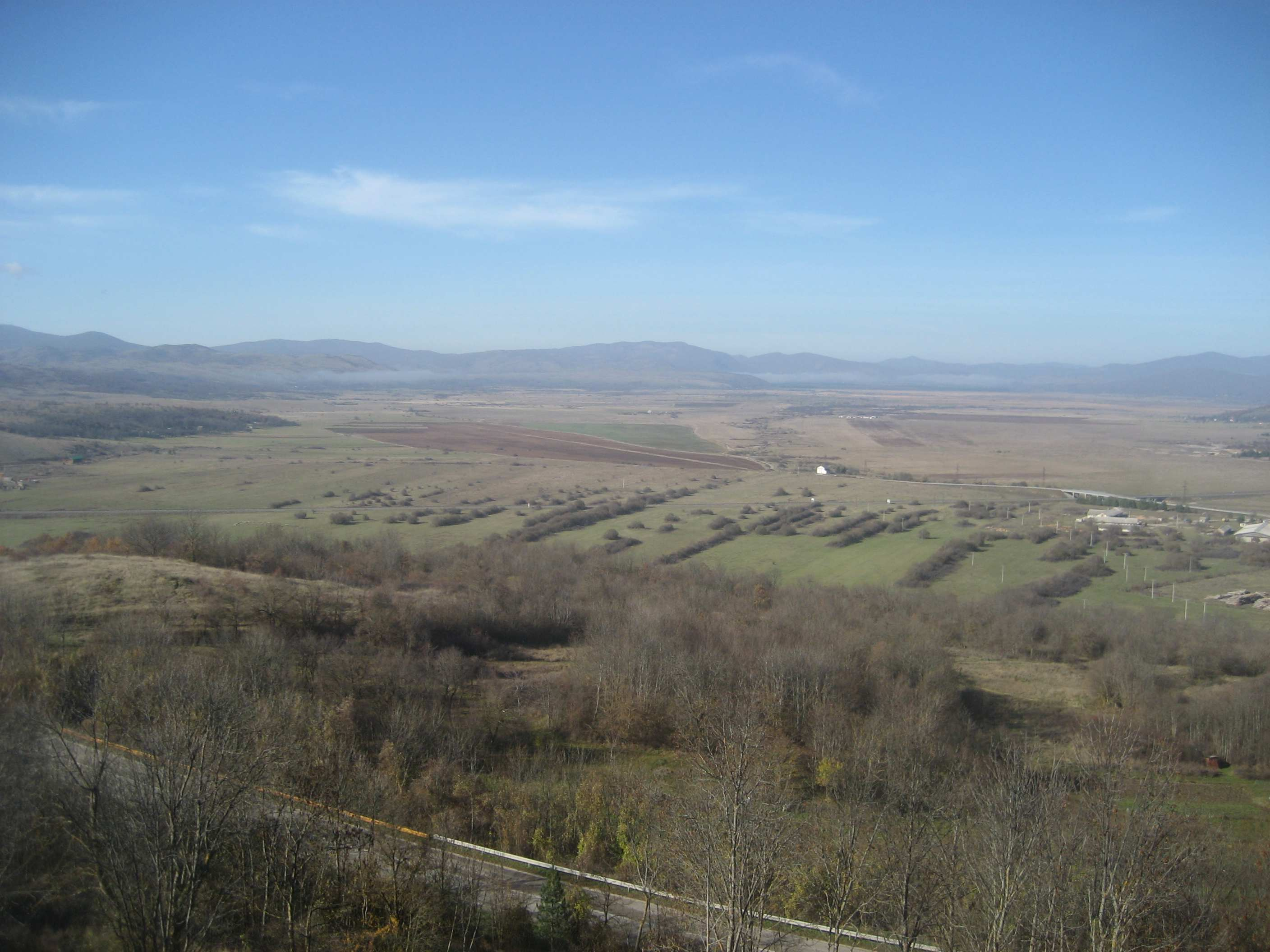
Operation Morgenstern was carried out to clear the Krbavsko polje region of Partisans

On 1 April 1944, Mickl was promoted to Generalleutnant. He identified that the Partisan 13th Division was using the Drežnica valley as a huge armoury, hiding captured Italian arms and ammunition in villages, basements, and even in fake graves in cemeteries. This was of major concern if the feared Allied landing eventuated. In mid-April, Mickl ordered Operation Keulenschlag (Mace Blow) to clear the area, using the 846th Infantry Regiment and parts of the 847th Infantry Regiment, supported by the divisional artillery and flak battalion. Over the next two weeks, the division pushed the Partisan 13th Division north to the area of Mrkopalj and Delnice, and captured sufficient material to equip two divisions, including 30 tons of small arms ammunition and 15 tons of artillery ammunition.

The Partisan 35th Division attacked from the Plitvice Lakes area on 5 May and captured the village of Ramljane. Partisans also interdicted the Otočac-Gospić road. In response, Mickl planned Operation Morgenstern (Morning Star) to clear Partisan forces from the Krbavsko Polje region around Udbina. From 7 to 16 May 1944, along with elements of the 373rd (Croatian) Infantry Division, the 92nd Motorised Regiment, a battalion of the 1st Regiment of the Brandenburg Division, and Ustaše units, were involved in Operation Morgenstern. For its efforts in this operation, the division received its first mention in the Wehrmachtbericht (armed forces daily radio broadcast). Also in May, the division received 500 German reinforcements, and formed a field replacement battalion. The division saw action against the Partisans until the end of the war, often fighting alongside a grouping of Ustaše units that numbered up to 12,000 troops.

== Death and commemoration ==
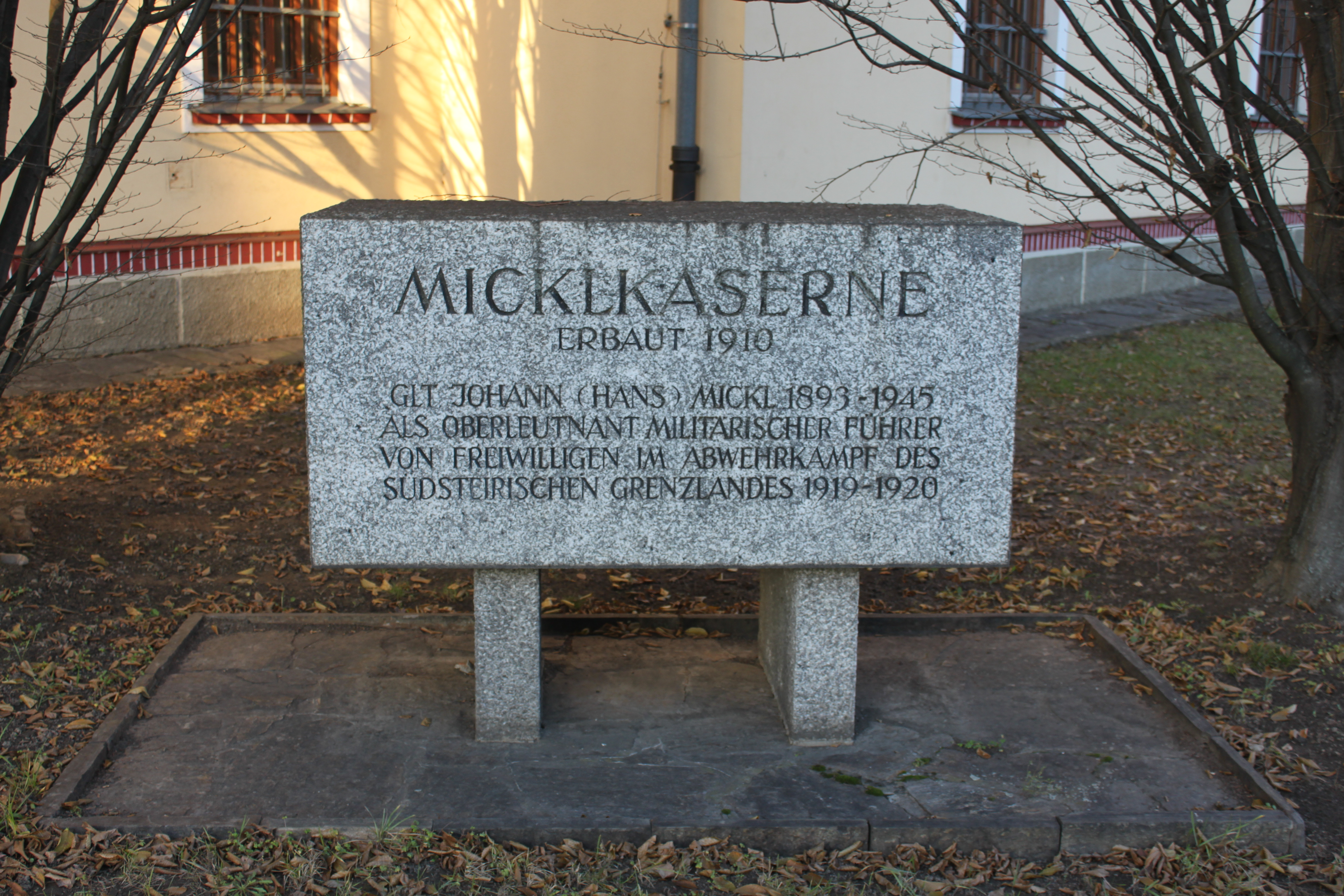
The dedication tablet at the Mickl-Kaserne in Bad Radkersburg, named after Mickl in honour of his service in the Volkswehr militia in 1919–1920

During the last few months of the war, the division was engaged in the defence of the northern Adriatic coast and Lika. On 8 April 1945, the city of Senj fell to the Partisans. The following day, during the fighting to control the Vratnik pass through the mountains from Senj to Brinje, Mickl personally took part in the fighting and was shot in the head around noon. He was transported to hospital in Fiume, and died the following day. Mickl's wife, Helene, died in July 1946 of cancer.

In 1967, the Austrian Armed Forces barracks (Mickl-Kaserne) in Bad Radkersburg were named after him, and they were used continuously by the Austrian Armed Forces for 44 years until 30 September 2008.

== Promotions ==
- Leutnant – 1 August 1914
- Oberleutnant – 1 May 1915
- Hauptmann – 1921
- Major – 1928
- Oberstleutnant – 16 January 1936
- Oberst – 1 June 1940
- Generalmajor – 1 March 1943
- Generalleutnant – 1 April 1944

== Awards and decorations ==
Austria-Hungary

- Military Merit Cross 3rd Class (16 October 1915)
- Order of the Iron Crown 3rd Class (22 March 1916)
- Military Merit Medal for Bravery
  - in Bronze (26 August 1916)
  - 1st in Silver (20 January 1917)
  - 2nd in Silver (24 January 1918)
- Karl Troop Cross (8 September 1917)
- Wound Medal with 5 Stripes (10 March 1918)

Carinthia

- Common Carinthian Cross for Bravery (5 December 1919)
- Special Carinthian Cross for Bravery (3 April 1920)

Federal State of Austria

- Medal of Merit in Gold (7 October 1934)

Nazi Germany

- Iron Cross (1939)
  - 2nd Class (1 October 1939)
  - 1st Class (15 June 1940)
- Panzer Badge in Bronze (24 September 1940)
- Wound Badge in Black (25 December 1941)
- Infantry Assault Badge (22 July 1942)
- Knight's Cross of the Iron Cross with Oak Leaves
  - Knight's Cross on 13 December 1941 as Oberst and commander of Schützen-Regiment 155
  - 205th Oak Leaves on 6 March 1943 as Oberst and commander of Panzergrenadier-Regiment 25

== Footnotes ==
Military offices
Preceded by Generalmajor Max Sümmermann †	Commander of 90th Light Infantry Division; 11 December 1941 – 27 December 1941	Succeeded by Generalmajor Richard Veith
Preceded by General der Infanterie Dietrich von Choltitz	Commander of 11th Panzer Division; 11 May 1943 – 8 August 1943	Succeeded by Generalleutnant Wend von Wietersheim
Preceded by None	Commander of 392nd (Croatian) Infantry Division; 17 August 1943 – 10 April 1945	Succeeded by None
