= Wietersheim =

Wietersheim may refer to the following:

== Places ==
- Wietersheim, a district in the town of Petershagen, Germany.

== Persons ==
- Gustav Anton von Wietersheim (1884 – 1974), German General
- Walter von Wietersheim (1917), German Major
- Wend von Wietersheim (1900 – 1975), German Lieutenant General
