= General Winder =

General Winder may refer to:

- Charles Sidney Winder (1829–1862), Confederate States Army brigadier general
- John H. Winder (1800–1865), Confederate States Army brigadier general
- Levin Winder (1757–1819), Maryland Militia brigadier general
- William H. Winder (1775–1824), U.S. Army brigadier general

== See also ==
- General Winter (disambiguation)
