= Amtsgruppe Allgemeine Wehrmachtsangelegenheiten =

Amtsgruppe Allgemeine Wehrmachtsangelegenheiten (transl. Office Group for General Wehrmacht Affairs) was a division of the Wehrmacht High Command. In 1938–1939 it was designated the Wehrwirtschaftsstab (Military Economy Staff). Hermann Reinecke was made the leader in 1939.

== Bibliography ==
- Christian Zentner, Friedemann Bedürftig (1991). The Encyclopedia of the Third Reich. Macmillan, New York. ISBN 0-02-897502-2
