= 11th Panzer Division =

German army division during World War II

- 11. Panzerdivision; — 11. PzDiv — XX
- Active: 1 August 1940 – 8 May 1945
- Country: Germany
- Branch: German Heer
- Type: Panzer
- Role: Armoured warfare
- Size: Division
- Part of: Wehrmacht
- Garrison/HQ: Wehrkreis VIII: Sagan
- Engagements: World War II; Invasion of Yugoslavia; Operation Barbarossa; Case Blue; Battle of Kursk; Battle of Korsun–Cherkassy; Battle of the Bulge

Insignia
- 1940

- at Kursk

- Ghost

The 11th Panzer Division (English: 11th Tank Division) was an armoured division in the German Army during World War II, established in 1940.

The division saw action on the Eastern and Western Fronts during the Second World War. The 11th Panzer Division did not participate in the war until the invasion of Yugoslavia. It fought in the Soviet Union from 1941 to 1944 and, in the last year of the war, in southern France and Germany. The formation's emblem was a ghost.

== History ==
=== Formation ===
The 11th Panzer Division was formed on 1 August 1940 from the 11th Schützen-Brigade and the Panzer Regiment 15 removed from the 5th Panzer Division and elements of the 231st Infantry Division, 311th Infantry Division and 209th Infantry Division. Most of its members were from Silesia (Wehrkreis VIII).

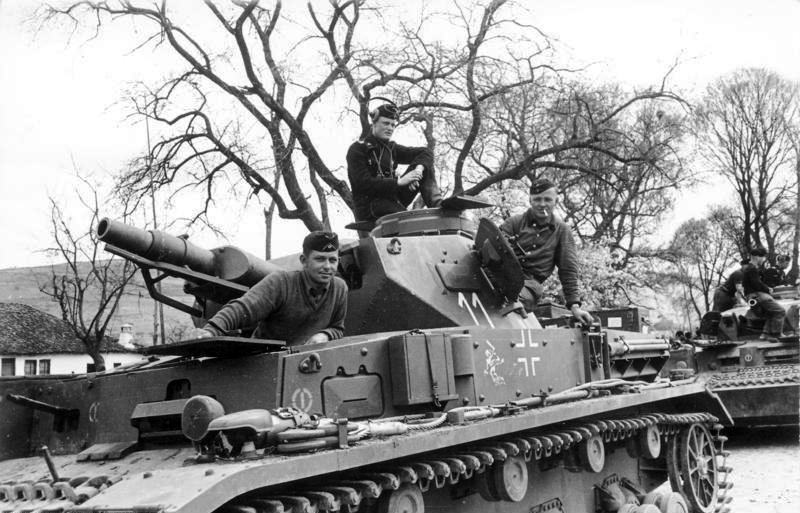
Panzer IVs of the 11th Panzer Division during the invasion of Yugoslavia

The 11th Panzer Division saw action for the first time in the invasion of Yugoslavia in April 1941. Passing through Bulgaria, it arrived in Belgrade and assisted in the capture of that city.

The division was then sent to the Eastern Front where it was part of the Army Group South. It participated in the Battle of Kiev and later took part in the Battle of Moscow. At the Battle of Moscow Soviet propaganda made a fictional claim about the 11th Panzer Division in the fabricated encounter with Panfilov's Twenty-Eight Guardsmen. The division was engaged in retreat and defensive operations after the Soviet counteroffensive in December 1941. The 11th Panzer Division's advance finally came to a halt due to the strong resistance of the 316th Rifle Division and the 78th Rifle Division. Harsh weather conditions were also a factor.

=== Case Blue and the Chir River Battles ===
The 11th Panzer Division was part of Case Blue from June 1942 onward, participating in the capture of Voronezh and the drive towards Stalingrad. It avoided being entrapped with the 6th Army in the city but suffered substantial losses during the winter of 1942-43.

11th Panzer, as part of 48th Panzer Corps, was originally earmarked for Operation Winter Storm, the German effort to rescue 6th Army from encirclement, but attacks from the Soviet 5th Tank Army tied it down and prevented the division from participating in the counteroffensive. In the course of defending the lower Chir river from Soviet 5th Tank Army, the 11th Panzer Division fought a series of tank battles in support of the besieged infantry of 48th Panzer Corps.

Detraining on December 7, 1942, 11th Panzer Division's 15th Panzer Regiment immediately had to drive north to push back the 8th Motorcycle Regiment, the leading element of 1st Tank Corps, which had broken through the German front line southwest of Ostrovsky earlier in the day. The next day, the 11th Panzer Division enveloped the bulk of the Soviet 1st Tank Corps at State Farm No. 79, counting 53 Soviet tanks destroyed before the remnants of 117th, 159th, and 216th Tank Brigades fought their way out of the trap and retreated behind friendly lines. Before 11th Panzer could eliminate the Soviet bridgehead, 5th Tank Army's fresh 5th Mechanized Corps crossed the Chir river West of Surovikino, while elements of the 3rd Guards Cavalry Corps crossed the Chir southeast of Surovikino and captured Linsinskii, threatening the rear of the 336th Infantry Division. The next day, Balck dispatched half of 11th Panzer's 15th Panzer Regiment, supported by elements of the 336th Infantry Division, to smash the advance elements of 3rd Guards Cavalry Corps, while the remainder of 15th Panzer Regiment, supported by the division's 111th Grenadier Regiment, counterattacked and reduced 5th Mechanized Corps' bridgehead over the Chir.

On 19 December 1942 the 11th Panzer Division destroyed 42 Russian tanks without losing any of its own tanks just south of Oblivskaya. The division engaged a second Soviet attack destroying 65 more Soviet tanks without suffering any losses. By the end of the day the 11th Panzer Division had destroyed an entire Soviet Mechanized Corps. On 21 December 1942 the 11th Panzer Division destroyed much of the Soviet 5th Tank Army during a counterattack along the Chir. The division suffered heavy losses in the process.

It was engaged in the failed relief attempt on Stalingrad and then participated in the defense of Rostov, which allowed the German troops retreating from the Caucasus to escape.

=== On the defensive ===
In July 1943, it participated in the Battle of Kursk and the defensive operations and retreat that followed the German failure. It was entrapped in the Korsun-Cherkassy Pocket in February 1944 and almost completely destroyed in the break-out from the pocket. The division was withdrawn from the front and sent to Bordeaux, France after receiving personnel drawn from the 273rd Reserve Panzer Division.

After being stationed in the Toulouse area, the division was moved to a section of the Rhône in July 1944. When the Allies invaded southern France in August 1944 it retreated via the Rhône corridor, reaching Besançon. Later entering combat in Alsace, it helped in the defence of the Belfort Gap and was defeated in the Battle of Arracourt before going back to the Saar. In December 1944, the division fought as part of the Army Group G.

At the beginning of the Battle of the Bulge, which it did not participate in, the division had 3,500 personnel, including 800 infantry. Following the failure of the German offensive, the 11th Panzer Division entered combat in Saarland and Moselle and fought at Remagen with 4,000 soldiers, 25 tanks and 18 guns that still remained, but was expelled from the region by the advancing US forces.

It was then shifted to the southern sector of the front, with its forces stationed in and encircled in the Ruhr. The 11th Panzer Division retreated south east, eventually surrendering to US forces in the area around Passau on 2 May 1945. Some of the remnants of the 11th Panzer Division, under command of General Wend von Wietersheim, surrendered to the US 90th Infantry Division at the Czech town of Všeruby on 4 May 1945.

== Commanders ==
The commanders of the division:

- General der Panzertruppe Ludwig Crüwell (1 August 1940 – 15 August 1941)
- Generalleutnant Günther Angern (15 August 1941 – 24 August 1941)
- General der Panzertruppe Hans-Karl Freiherr von Esebeck (24 August 1941 – 20 October 1941)
- Generalleutnant Walter Scheller (20 October 1941 – 16 May 1942)
- General der Panzertruppe Hermann Balck (16 May 1942 – 4 March 1943)
- General der Infanterie Dietrich von Choltitz (4 March 1943 – 15 May 1943)
- Generalmajor Johann Mickl (15 May 1943 – 10 August 1943)
- Generalleutnant Wend von Wietersheim (10 August 1943 – 10 April 1945)
- Generalmajor Horst Freiherr Treusch und Buttlar-Brandenfels (10 April 1945)

== Orders of Battle ==
The organisation of the division:

=== June 1941 ===
- Divisionstab
- 15. Panzer-Regiment
- 11. Schützen-Brigade
  - 110. Schützen-Regiment
  - 111. Schützen-Regiment
- 61. Kradschützen-Battalion
- 61. Panzerjäger-Abteilung
- 231. Aufklärungs-Abteilung
- 119. Artillerie Regiment
- 85. Nachrichten-Battalion
- 86. Pionier-Battalion
- 71. Flak-Battalion (attached)
- 2 / 21.Panzer Luftwaffe Observation Staffel (attached)

=== July 1943 ===
- Divisionstab
- 15. Panzer-Regiment
- 110. Panzergrenadier-Regiment
- 111. Panzergrenadier-Regiment
- 61. Panzerjäger-Abteilung
- 11. Aufklärungs-Abteilung
- 119. Panzer-Artillerie-Regiment
- 277. Heeres-Flak-Battalion
- 209. Panzer-Pioneer-Battalion
- 89. Panzer-Nachrichten-Battalion
- 61. Feldersatz-Battalion

== See also ==
- Organisation of a SS Panzer Division
- Panzer division
