= Domenico dell'Allio =

Italian architect

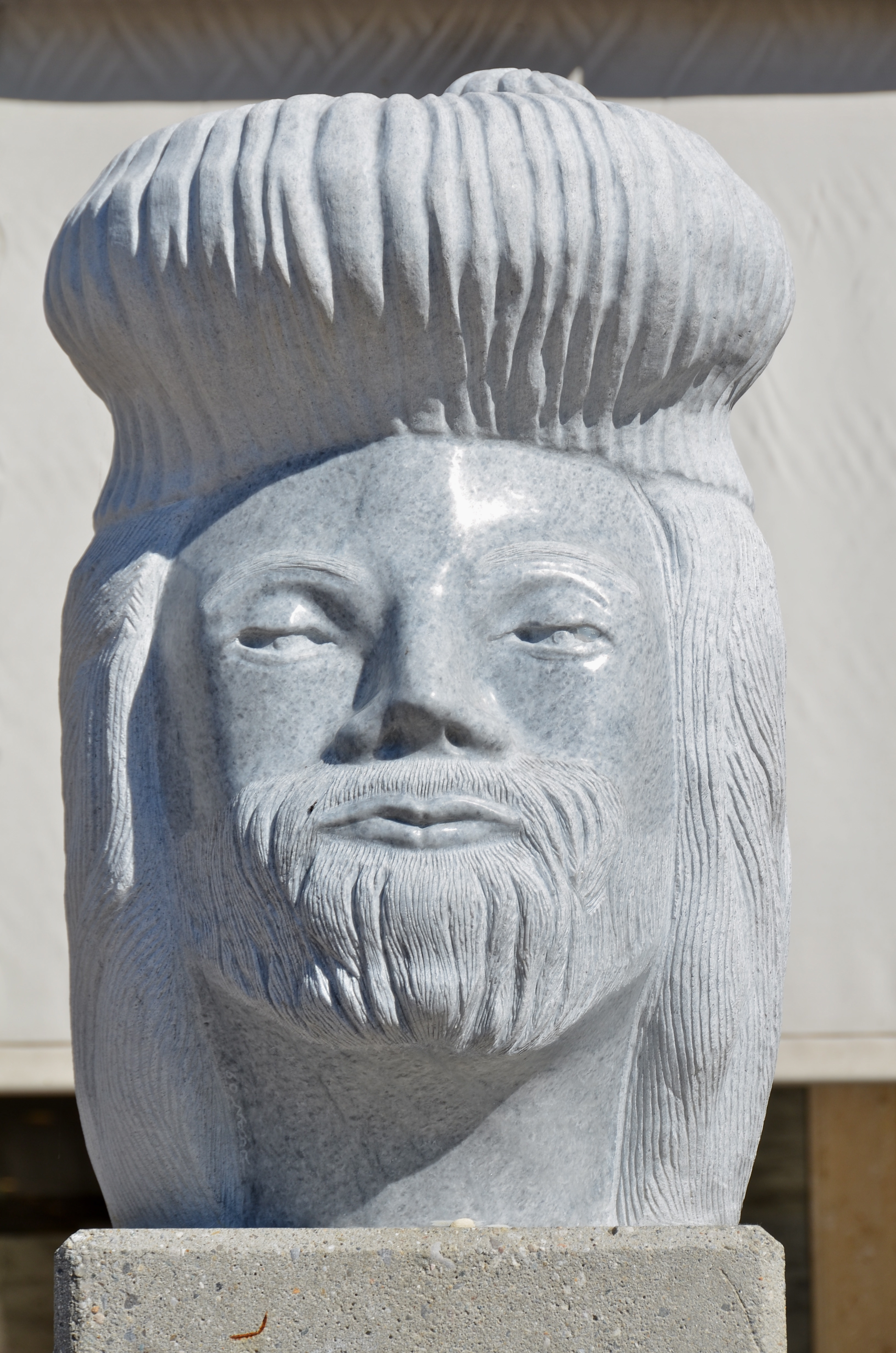
Marble bust for Renaissance architect Domenico dell’Allio in Klagenfurt, 10.-Oktober-Strasse

Domenico dell'Allio (1505–1563) was an Italian Renaissance architect, working mostly in what was then Inner Austria, present-day Slovenia and parts of Italy, Austria and Croatia. He is best known for his work in the Landhaus (Seat of Regional Government) in Graz (1557–1565). He is also known for turning the Varaždin Castle into a Water castle, which used to be shown on the 5 kuna banknote before it was withdrawn.

He was the chief architect of the emperor Ferdinand I in his Inner Austrian domains, and was responsible for setting up the Italian-style modern fortification system in Croatia, along the border with the Ottoman Empire. He planned the town of Klagenfurt, which had previously been a small settlement donated to the Carinthian estates by emperor Maximilian for their residence. He led the reconstruction of many castles that had been destroyed and frequently only partially rebuilt in the disastrous 1511 earthquake. His work is attested in several Sytrian towns, such as Radkersburg, Maribor and Ptuj.

Dell'Allio popularized the Renaissance style in present-day southern Austria, Slovenia and central Croatia. He is considered the foremost Renaissance architect in the Eastern Alps in the 16th century. He was ennobled by Emperor Ferdinand in 1558.

He went missing during one of his inspection tours of the Croatian-Ottoman borderlands.

His brother Giovanni or Hans Dell'Allio was also an architect. The 17th centuries Austrian-Italian Baroque architects Andrea Allio the Elder and Andrea Allio the Younger were most probably his relatives.

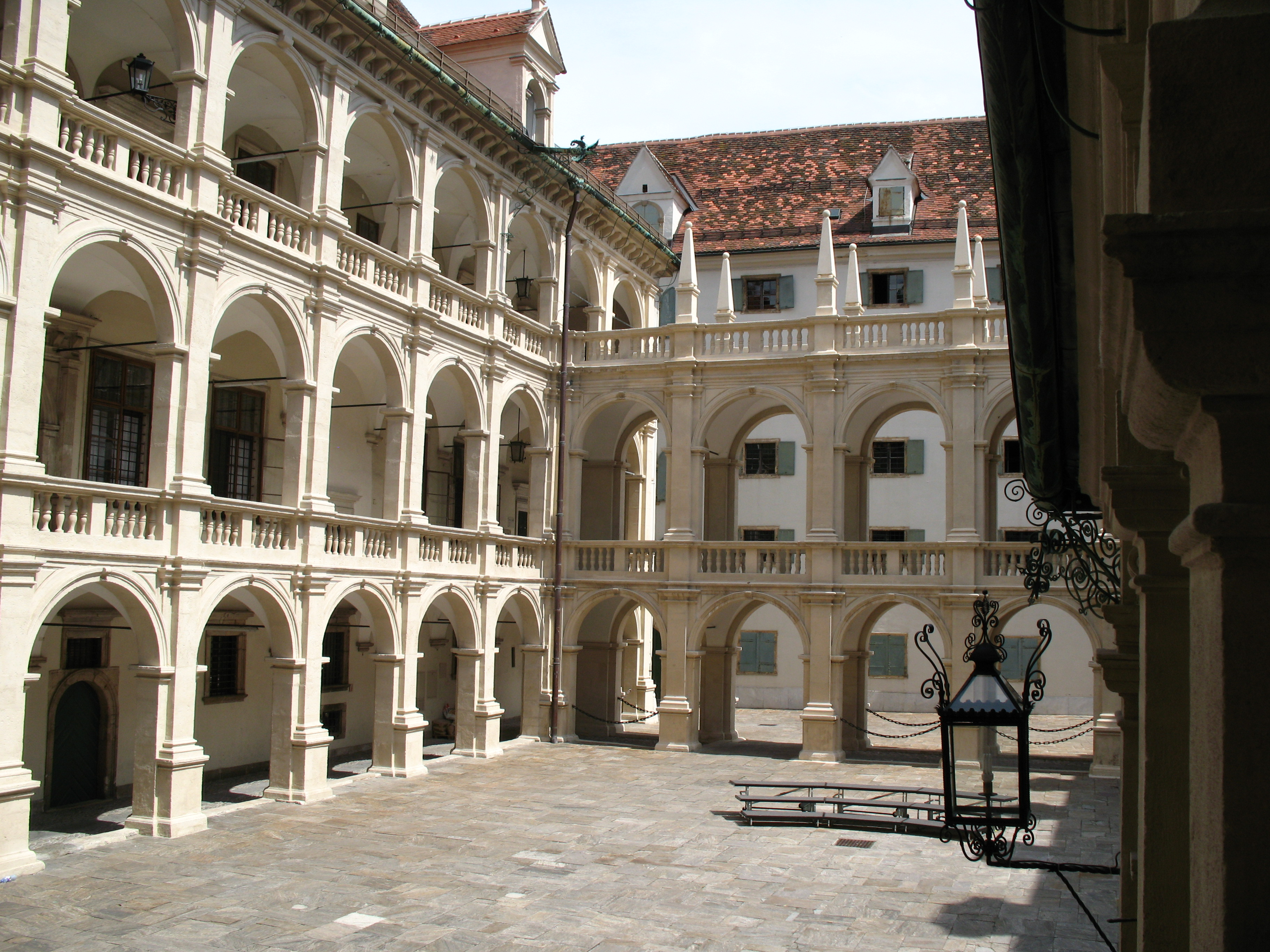
The Landhaus in Graz, 1557–65.
