= Oberkommando der Wehrmacht =

Supreme military command and control office of Nazi Germany during World War II

Armed Forces High Command
- Oberkommando der Wehrmacht
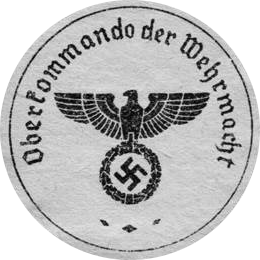
- Founded: 4 February 1938
- Disbanded: 23 May 1945
- Country: Nazi Germany
- Allegiance: Adolf Hitler
- Type: High command
- Role: Nominally oversaw: Army High Command; Naval High Command; Air Force High Command
- Part of: Armed forces
- Headquarters: Wünsdorf
- Nickname: OKW
- Engagements: World War II in Europe

Commanders
- Chief of the OKW: Wilhelm Keitel
- Chief of Operations Staff: Alfred Jodl

Insignia
- Chief of the OKW flag (1938–1941)

- Chief of the OKW flag (1941–1945)

The Oberkommando der Wehrmacht (German: [ˈoːbɐkɔˌmando deːɐ̯ ˈveːɐ̯ˌmaxt]; abbreviated OKW; "Armed Forces High Command") was the supreme military command and control staff of Nazi Germany during World War II, that was directly subordinated to Adolf Hitler. Created in 1938, the OKW succeeded the Reich Ministry of War and had nominal oversight over the individual high commands of the country's armed forces: the army (Heer), navy (Kriegsmarine) and air force (Luftwaffe). With the start of World War II, tactical control of the Waffen-SS was also exercised by it. There was no direct chain of command between the OKW and the other High Commands.

Rivalry with the different services' commands, mainly with the Army High Command (OKH), prevented the OKW from becoming a unified German General Staff in an effective chain of command, though it did help coordinate operations among the three services. During the war, the OKW acquired more and more operational powers. By 1942, the OKW had responsibility for all theatres except for the Eastern Front. However, Hitler manipulated the system in order to prevent any one command from taking a dominant role in decision making. This "divide and conquer" method helped put most military decisions in Hitler's own hands, which at times included even those affecting engagements at the battalion level, a practice which, due to bureaucratic delays and Hitler's worsening indecision as the war progressed, would eventually contribute to Germany's defeat.

== Genesis ==
The OKW was established by executive decree on 4 February 1938, in the aftermath of the Blomberg-Fritsch affair, which had led to the dismissal of the Commander-in-Chief of the Armed Forces and head of the Reich Ministry of War, Werner von Blomberg, as well as the Commander-in-Chief of the Army, Werner von Fritsch.

Adolf Hitler, who had been waiting for an opportunity to gain personal control over the German military, quickly took advantage of the scandal, using the powers granted to him by the Enabling Act to do so. The decree dissolved the ministry and replaced it with the OKW. The OKW was directly subordinate to Hitler in his position as Oberster Befehlshaber der Wehrmacht (Supreme Commander of the Armed Forces), to the detriment of the existing military structure.

The OKW was led by Field Marshal Wilhelm Keitel as Chief of the OKW with the rank of a Reich Minister, which essentially made him the second most powerful person in the armed forces' hierarchy after Hitler. The next officer after Keitel was Lieutenant General Alfred Jodl, who served as the OKW's Chief of Operations Staff. However, despite this seemingly powerful hierarchy, the German military's officers mostly disregarded Keitel's position, deeming him nothing more than Hitler's lackey. Other officers often had direct access to the Führer, such as officers with the rank of field marshal, while other officers even outranked Keitel, an example being the Commander-in-Chief of the Air Force, Hermann Göring. In theory this position meant Göring was subordinate to Keitel, but his alternate rank of Reichsmarschall made him the second most powerful person in Germany after Hitler, and he used this alternate power to circumvent Keitel and access Hitler directly whenever he wished.

By June 1938, the OKW comprised four departments:

- Wehrmacht-Führungsamt (WFA; initially Amtsgruppe Führungsstab bezeichnet, renamed Wehrmachtführungsstab (Wfst) in August 1940) – operations staff. Chief: Colonel General Alfred Jodl, 1 September 1939 – 8 May 1945
  - Abteilung Landesverteidigungsführungsamt (WFA/L) a sub-department through which all details of operational planning were worked out, and from which all operational orders were communicated to the OKW. Chief: Major General Walter Warlimont, 1 September 1939 – 6 September 1944; Major General Horst Freiherr Treusch von Buttlar-Brandenfels, 6 September 1944 – 30 November 1944; General August Winter, 1 December 1944 – 23 April 1945
  - Wehrmacht Propaganda Troops: its function was to produce and disseminate propaganda materials aimed at the German troops and the population. Commanded by General Hasso von Wedel (1 September 1939 – 8 May 1945), the department oversaw the numerous propaganda companies (Propagandakompanie) of the Wehrmacht and the Waffen-SS, attached to the fighting troops. At its peak in 1942, the propaganda troops included 15,000 men. Among the propaganda materials produced was the Wehrmachtbericht, the official news communiqué about the military situation of Germany and was intended for both domestic and foreign consumption.
  - Heeresstab – army staff. Chief: General Walther Buhle, 15 February 1942 – 8 May 1945
  - Inspekteur der Wehrmachtnachrichtenverbände – Chief of Staff, Wehrmacht signal corps
- Amt Ausland/Abwehr – foreign intelligence (Note: Also known by title Amtsgruppe Auslandsnachrichten und Abwehr)
  - Zentralabteilung – central department. Chief: Major General Hans Oster, 1 September 1939 – January 1944
  - Abteilung Ausland – foreign. Chief: Admiral Leopold Bürkner, 15 June 1938 –
  - Abteilung I, Nachrichtenbeschaffung – intelligence. Chief: Colonel Hans Piekenbrock, 1 September 1939 – March 1943; Colonel Georg Hansen, March 1943 – February 1944
  - Abteilung II, Sonderdienst – special service. Chief: Colonel Erwin von Lahousen, 1 September 1939 – July 1943; Colonel Wessel Freytag von Loringhoven, July 1943 – June 1944
  - Abteilung III, Abwehr – counter-intelligence. Chief: Colonel Franz Eccard von Bentivegni, 1 March 1941 –
  - Auslands(telegramm)prüfstelle – foreign communications
- Wirtschafts und Rüstungsamt – supply matters (Note: Also known by title Wehrwirtschaftsstab.)
- Amtsgruppe Allgemeine Wehrmachtsangelegenheiten – miscellaneous matters
  - Deutsche Dienststelle (WASt) – information center for war casualties and prisoners of war

The WFA replaced the Wehrmachtsamt (Armed Forces Office) which had existed between 1935 and 1938 within the Reich War Ministry, headed by Keitel. Hitler promoted Keitel to Chief of the OKW (Chef des OKW), i.e. Chief of the Armed Forces High Command. As head of the WFA, Keitel appointed Max von Viebahn although after two months he was removed from command, and this post was not refilled until the promotion of Alfred Jodl. To replace Jodl at the Abteilung Landesverteidigungsführungsamt (WFA/L), Walther Warlimont was appointed. (Note: Warlimont being replaced in September 1944 due to ill health by General August Winter.) In December 1941 further changes took place with the Abteilung Landesverteidigungsführungsamt (WFA/L) being merged into the Wehrmacht-Führungsamt and losing its role as a subordinate organization. These changes were largely cosmetic however as key staff remained in post and continued to fulfill the same duties.

== List of commanders ==
Chief of the OKW

No.	Portrait	Chief of the OKW	Took office	Left office	Time in office	Ref.
1	Wilhelm Keitel	Generalfeldmarschall; Wilhelm Keitel (1882–1946)	4 February 1938	13 May 1945	7 years, 98 days	
2	Alfred Jodl	Generaloberst; Alfred Jodl (1890–1946)	13 May 1945	23 May 1945	10 days	

Chief of Operations Staff of the OKW

No.	Portrait	Chief of Operations Staff	Took office	Left office	Time in office	Ref.
1	Max von Viebahn [de]	Generalleutnant; Max von Viebahn (1888–1980)	21 February 1938	April 1938	2 months	–
2	Alfred Jodl	Generalmajor; Alfred Jodl (1890–1946)	1 September 1939	13 May 1945	5 years, 254 days	

== Operations ==
Officially, the OKW served as the military general staff for the Third Reich, coordinating the efforts of the army, navy, and air force. With the start of World War II, tactical control of the Waffen-SS was exercised by the Oberkommando der Wehrmacht. In practice, however, Hitler used OKW as his personal military staff, translating his ideas into military orders, such as the Führer Directives, and issuing them to the three services while having little control over them. However, as the war progressed, the OKW found itself exercising increasing amounts of direct command authority over military units, particularly in the west. This created a situation such that by 1942, the OKW held the de facto command of western forces while the Army High Command directly controlled the Eastern Front. It was not until 28 April 1945 (two days before his suicide) that Hitler placed the OKH directly under the OKW, finally giving the latter full command of Germany's armed forces.

True to his strategy of setting different parts of the Nazi bureaucracy to compete for his favor in areas where their administration overlapped, Hitler ensured there was a rivalry between the OKW and the OKH. Since most German operations during World War II were army-controlled (with Luftwaffe support), the OKH demanded control over German military forces. Nevertheless, Hitler decided against the OKH in favor of the OKW overseeing operations in many land theaters, despite being the head of the OKH. As the war progressed, more and more influence moved from the OKH to the OKW, with Norway being the first "OKW war theater". More and more areas came under complete control of the OKW. Finally, only the Eastern Front remained the domain of the OKH. However, as the Eastern Front was by far the primary battlefield of the German military, the OKH was still influential.

The OKW ran military operations on the Western front, in North Africa, and in Italy. In the west, operations were further split between the OKW and Oberbefehlshaber West (OBW, Commander in Chief West), who was Generalfeldmarschall Gerd von Rundstedt (succeeded by Field Marshal Günther von Kluge).

There was even more fragmentation since the Kriegsmarine and Luftwaffe operations had their own commands (the Oberkommando der Marine (OKM) and the Oberkommando der Luftwaffe (OKL)) which, while theoretically subordinate, were largely independent from the OKW or the OKH. Further complications in OKW operations also arose in circumstances such as when, on 19 December 1941, Hitler dismissed Walther von Brauchitsch as Commander-in-Chief of the Army, after the failure of the Battle of Moscow, and assumed von Brauchitsch's former position, in essence reporting directly to himself, since the Commander-in-Chief of the Army reported to the Supreme Commander of the Armed Forces.

In Berlin and Königsberg, the German Army had large Fernschreibstelle (teleprinter offices) which collected morning messages each day from regional or local centres. They also had a Geheimschreibstube or cipher room where plaintext messages could be encrypted on Lorenz SZ40/42 machines. If sent by radio rather than landline they were intercepted and decrypted at Bletchley Park in England, where they were known as Fish. Some messages were daily returns, and some were between Hitler and his generals; both were valuable to Allied intelligence.

== International Military Tribunal ==
During the Nuremberg trials, the OKW was indicted but acquitted of being a criminal organization because of Article 9 of the charter of the International Military Tribunal.

In the opinion of the Tribunal, the General Staff and High Command is neither an "organisation" nor a "group"

Although the Tribunal is of the opinion that the term "group" in Article 9 must mean something more than this collection of military officers, it has heard much evidence as to the participation of these officers in planning and waging aggressive war, and in committing war crimes and crimes against humanity. This evidence is, as to many of them, clear and convincing.

They have been responsible, in large measure, for the miseries and suffering that have fallen on millions of men, women and children. They have been a disgrace to the honourable profession of arms. Without their military guidance, the aggressive ambitions of Hitler and his fellow Nazis would have been academic and sterile. Although they were not a group falling within the words of the Charter, they were certainly a ruthless military caste. The contemporary German militarism flourished briefly with its recent ally, National Socialism, as well as or better than it had in the generations of the past.

Many of these men have made a mockery of the soldier's oath of obedience to military orders. When it suits their defence they say they had to obey; when confronted with Hitler's brutal crimes, which are shown to have been within their general knowledge, they say they disobeyed. The truth is, they actively participated in all these crimes, or sat silent and acquiescent, witnessing the commission of crimes on a scale larger and more shocking than the world has ever had the misfortune to know. This must be said.

—

Despite this, both Keitel and Jodl were convicted of war crimes and sentenced to death by hanging.

During the subsequent High Command Trial in 1947–48, fourteen Wehrmacht officers were charged with war crimes, especially for the Commissar Order to execute Soviet political commissars in occupied territories in the east, the killing of POWs, and participation in the Holocaust. Eleven defendants received prison sentences ranging from three years, including time served, to lifetime imprisonment; two were acquitted on all counts and one committed suicide during the trial.

== See also ==
- Cipher Department of the High Command of the Wehrmacht
