= Horst Freiherr Treusch von Buttlar-Brandenfels =

WW2 German army general (1900-1990)

- Born: Friedrich Wilhelm August Christoph Hans Kurt Theodor Thilo Horst Freiherr Treusch von Buttlar-Brandenfels; 2 September 1900; Kassel, Province of Hesse-Nassau, Kingdom of Prussia, German Empire
- Died: 8 January 1990 (aged 89); Kassel, Hesse, Federal Republic of Germany
- Relatives: ∞ 1948 Helene "Leni" Perleberg
- Military career
- Allegiance: German Empire; Weimar Republic; Nazi Germany
- Branch: Imperial German Army; Freikorps (Grenzschutz Ost); Reichsheer; German Army
- Service years: 1917–1945
- Rank: Generalmajor
- Commands: 11th Panzer Division
- Conflicts: World War I World War II
- Awards: Iron Cross

Friedrich Wilhelm August Christoph Hans Kurt Theodor Thilo Horst Freiherr Treusch von Buttlar-Brandenfels (2 September 1900 – 8 January 1990) was a German general during World War II, commonly referred to as von Treusch, but also as von Buttlar-Brandenfels.

== Life ==
=== WWII ===
In 1944, Treusch was Army Operations Chief (OKW Major-General); he played a major role in not releasing the Panzer reserves (Panzer Lehr and the 12th SS Division) which had been requested by Gerd von Rundstedt. Rundstedt was Generalfeldmarschall of the German army during the initial Normandy landings by Allied troops.

He was briefly in command of the 11th Panzer Division of the Wehrmacht from April 1945 until the end of the war in May.

== Promotions ==
- 11.6.1917 Fahnenjunker
- 26.5.1918 Leutnant
  - 1.7.1922 received new rank seniority (RDA) from 1.7.1918
- 1.7.1925 Oberleutnant
- 1.7.1933 Rittmeister
- 1.1.1937 Major i. G.
  - later received new rank seniority (RDA) from 1.4.1936
- 1.8.1939 Oberstleutnant i. G.
- 1.2.1942 Oberst i. G.
- 1.1.1944 Generalmajor

== Awards and decorations (excerpt) ==
- Iron Cross (1914), 2nd and 1st Class
- Baltenkreuz
- Honour Cross of the World War 1914/1918 with Swords
- Wehrmacht Long Service Award, 4th to 2nd Class
- Repetition Clasp 1939 to the Iron Cross 1914, 2nd and 1st Class

Military offices
Preceded by Generalleutnant Wend von Wietersheim	Commander of 11.Panzer Division; 10 April 1945 –	Succeeded by none
