= General Winter (disambiguation) =

General Winter refers to the Russian Winter, due to its role in thwarting invasions of Russia. General Winter may also refer to:

- August Winter (1897–1979), German Wehrmacht general of mountain troops
- Ormonde Winter (1875–1962), British Army brigadier general

== See also ==
- Henry Wynter (1886–1945), Australian Army lieutenant general
