= Bad Radkersburg =

- Municipality
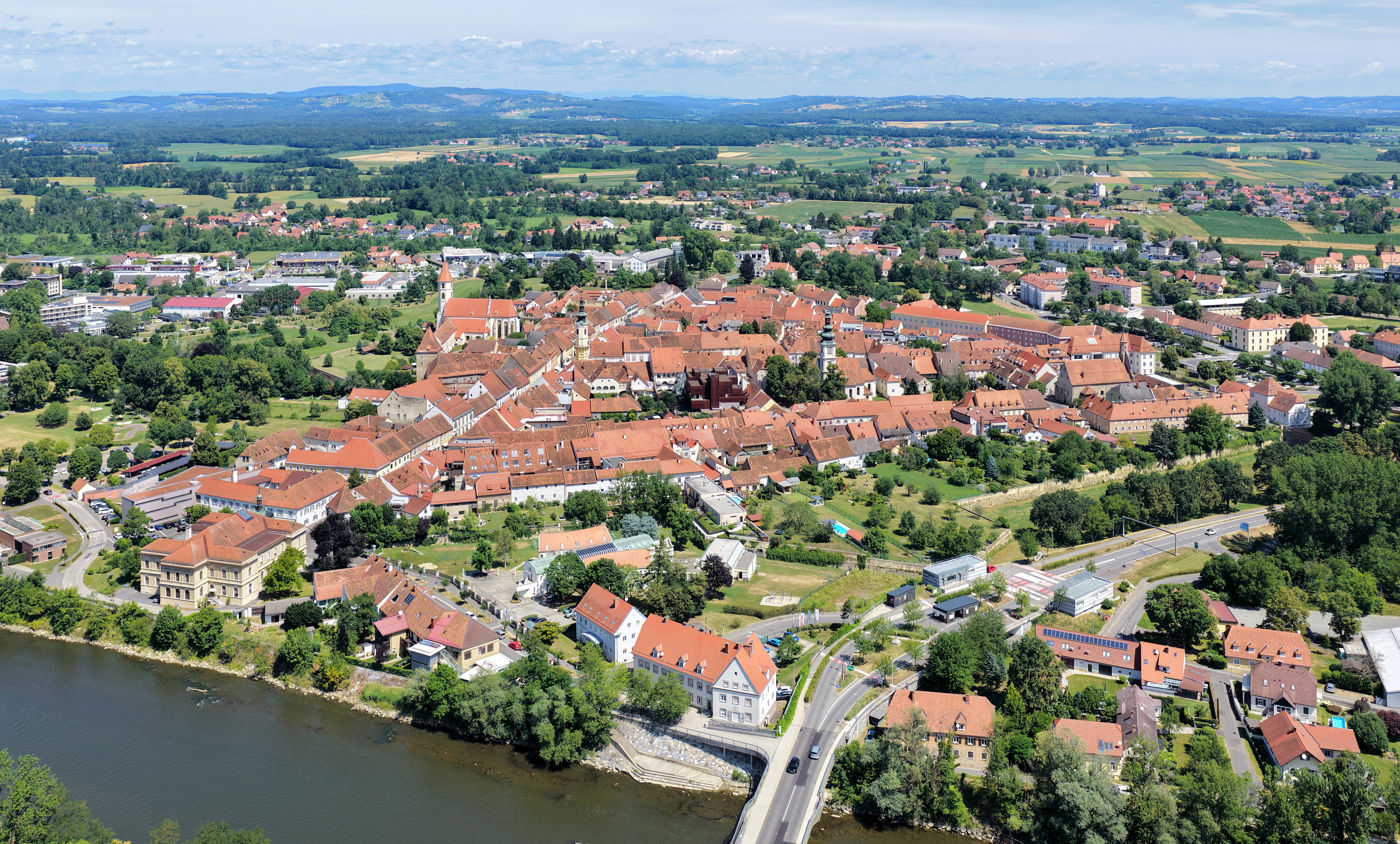
- Old Town of Bad Radkersburg

- Coat of arms

- Location within Styria#Location within Austria Bad Radkersburg (Austria)
- Coordinates: 46°41′23″N 15°59′19″E
- Country: Austria
- State: Styria
- District: Südoststeiermark

Government
  - Mayor: Karl Lautner (ÖVP)

Area
  - Total: 29.94 km^{2} (11.56 sq mi)
- Elevation: 209 m (686 ft)

Population (2018-01-01)
  - Total: 3,156
  - Density: 105.4/km^{2} (273.0/sq mi)
- Time zone: UTC+1 (CET)
  - Summer (DST): UTC+2 (CEST)
- Postal code: 8490
- Area code: 03476
- Vehicle registration: RA
- Website: www.badradkersburg.org

Bad Radkersburg (German pronunciation: [ˈbaːt ˈʁatkɐsbʊʁk]; Slovene: Radgona; archaic Hungarian: Regede) is a spa town in the southeast of the Austrian state of Styria, in the district of Südoststeiermark.

== Geography ==
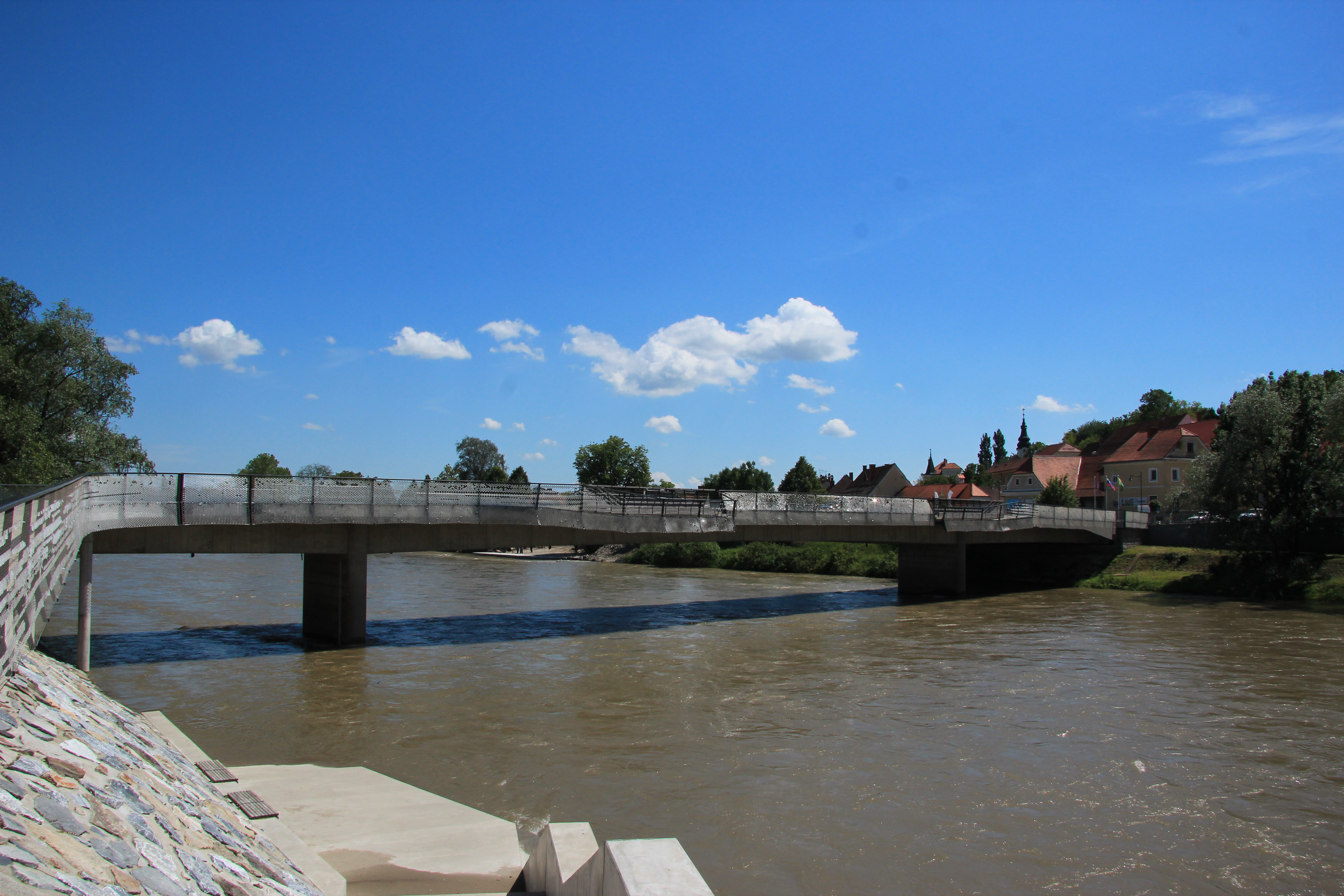
Mur bridge

In the south the town borders Slovenia on the Mur River. On the other side of the river lies its twin city Gornja Radgona (Oberradkersburg) in the Slovenian Styria region. Bad Radkersburg is a spa town featuring a thermal spring with a temperature of 80 °C (176 °F). This and the longest sunshine duration in Austria make it an attractive site for tourism with over 100,000 stays per year.

In the course of a Styrian administrative reform, the town merged with the neighbouring municipality of Radkersburg Umgebung with combined population of 3158 inhabitants, in effect from 1 January 2015.

=== Weather ===
Climate data for Bad Radkersburg 1971-2000
Month	Jan	Feb	Mar	Apr	May	Jun	Jul	Aug	Sep	Oct	Nov	Dec	Year
Mean daily maximum °C (°F)	2.9 (37.2)	5.8 (42.4)	11.3 (52.3)	16.0 (60.8)	21.0 (69.8)	23.9 (75.0)	25.9 (78.6)	25.3 (77.5)	21.4 (70.5)	15.2 (59.4)	8.0 (46.4)	3.5 (38.3)	15.1 (59.2)
Daily mean °C (°F)	−1.4 (29.5)	0.6 (33.1)	5.2 (41.4)	9.5 (49.1)	14.6 (58.3)	17.7 (63.9)	19.4 (66.9)	18.6 (65.5)	14.7 (58.5)	9.3 (48.7)	3.6 (38.5)	−0.3 (31.5)	9.3 (48.7)
Mean daily minimum °C (°F)	−4.4 (24.1)	−3.2 (26.2)	0.6 (33.1)	4.3 (39.7)	9.1 (48.4)	12.4 (54.3)	14.0 (57.2)	13.6 (56.5)	10.2 (50.4)	5.5 (41.9)	0.6 (33.1)	−3.2 (26.2)	5.0 (41.0)
Average precipitation mm (inches)	33.7 (1.33)	38.0 (1.50)	51.3 (2.02)	52.9 (2.08)	77.3 (3.04)	100.4 (3.95)	115.1 (4.53)	95.8 (3.77)	81.3 (3.20)	71.9 (2.83)	71.8 (2.83)	51.7 (2.04)	841.2 (33.12)
Average precipitation days (≥ 1.0 mm)	5.3	5.2	5.9	7.9	9.6	10.4	9.6	8.8	7.5	6.9	7.5	7.0	91.6
Mean monthly sunshine hours	80.9	143.5	154.3	186.1	236.6	226.6	249.3	235.1	168.5	121.6	66.7	60.9	1,930.1
Source: Zamg.ac.at

== History ==
It is not known when Radkersburg was first settled or where the first settlement, mentioned in an 1182 deed, was located. It is also not known when it fell under princely territorial rule. Most likely, Radkersburg originally did not belong to the Dukes of Styria, but possibly to an aristocrat named Radger to whom it had been given by the German king.

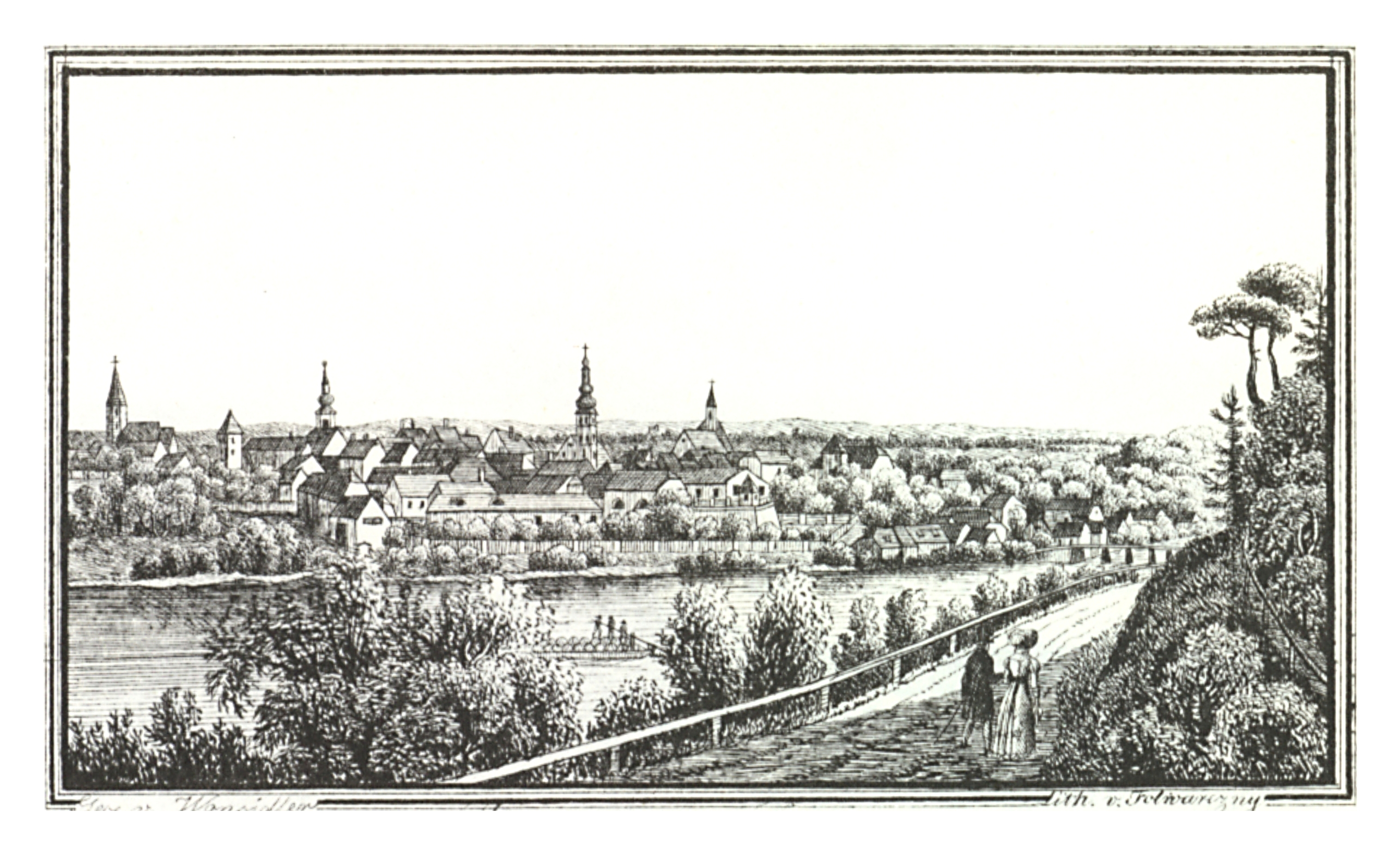
Radkersburg about 1830

A market is documented in a 1265/67 urbarium issued under King Ottokar II of Bohemia, who ruled Styria from 1261 to 1278, however, contemporary research suggests that the present-day town was founded by the Habsburg king Albert I of Germany, Duke of Styria, in the end of the 13th century. The appearance of the city today is apparently based on a precise plan, surrounded by a wall with towers. Radkersburg was first mentioned as a town in 1299.

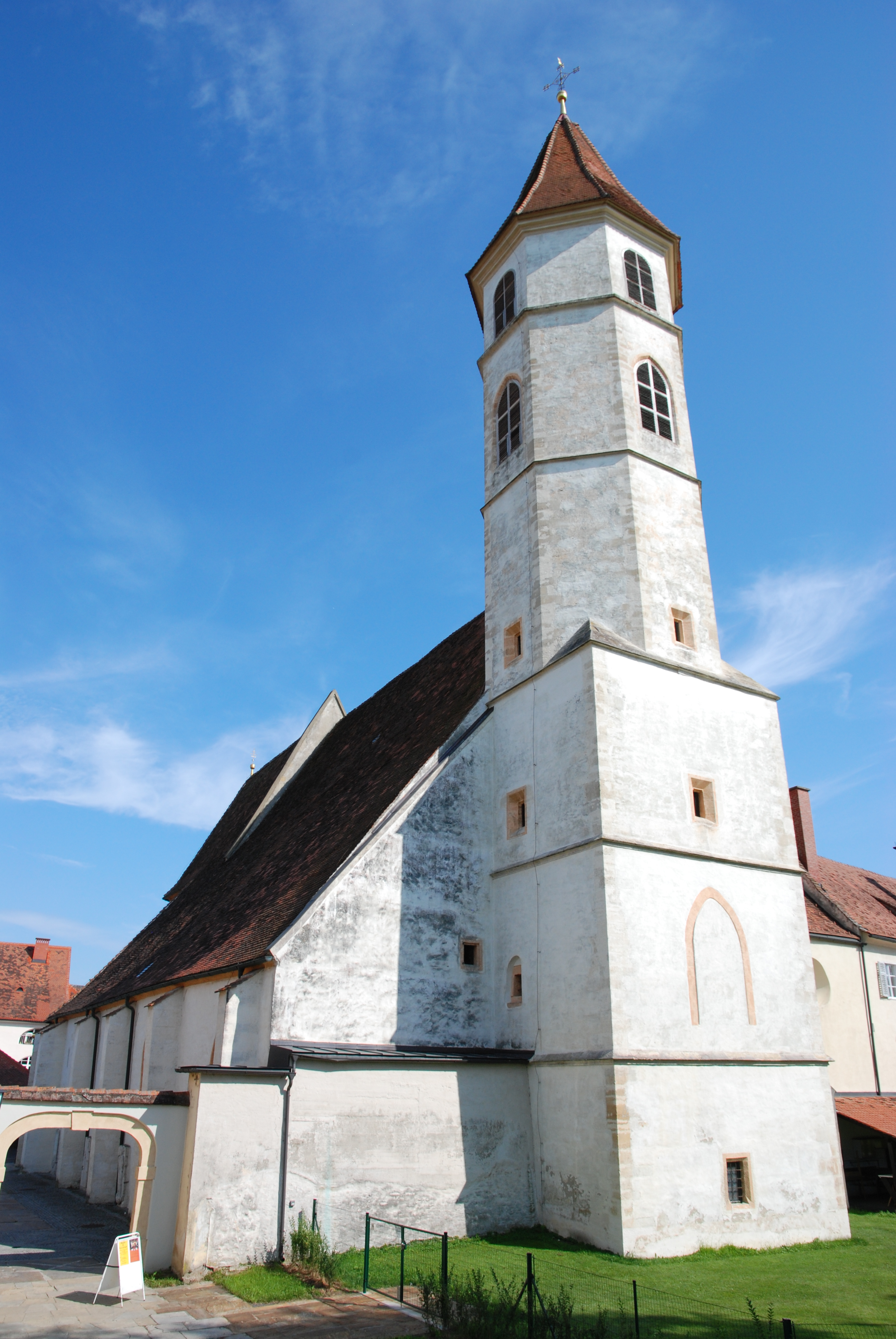
Parish church

Located near the border with the Kingdom of Hungary, it was affected by the armed conflict between King Matthias Corvinus and Emperor Frederick III in the late 15th century. During the Ottoman–Habsburg wars, extended fortifications were laid out according to plans designed by the Italian architect Domenico dell'Allio. Radkersburg was elevated to an Imperial fortress by resolution of the 1582 Diet of Augsburg.

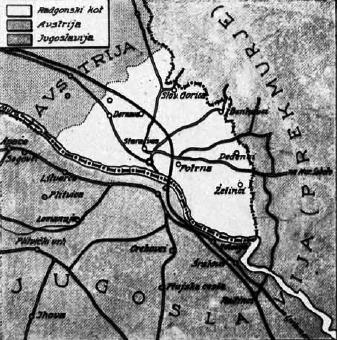
Austrian Radkersburg Corner, 1926 map

In the course of the 19th century language conflict, nationalist struggles in the ethnically mixed area arose between the predominantly German-speaking citizens and the Slovene-speaking peasant population down the Mur River. A garrison town of the Austro-Hungarian Army in World War I, it was occupied by troops of the newly emerged Kingdom of Serbs, Croats and Slovenes (Yugoslavia) on 1 December 1918. An armed revolt against the occupation forces, led by Johann Mickl, in order to affiliate the town with German-Austria failed. Nevertheless, by resolution of the 1919 Treaty of Saint-Germain, the area north of the Mur passed to the First Austrian Republic, while Oberradkersburg (Gornja Radgona) and the neighbouring municipality of Apače (Abstall), on the south bank, became part of Yugoslavia.

The nationalist conflicts lingered on, on both sides of the border. In World War II many members of the German minority greeted the Wehrmacht invasion of Yugoslavia in 1941 and joined the German combat units, while large parts of Radkersburg were devastated by armed conflicts. After the war, most of the remaining German-speaking population south of the Mur was forcibly expelled.

The Radkersburg bridge across the Mur was reopened on October 12, 1969, which led to a first rapprochement between Austria and Yugoslavia. In 1975 the town achieved spa status, another thermal spring was made accessible in 1978, soon followed by an extension to the bathing site. Since Slovenia joined the Schengen Area in 2007, border controls between Radkersburg and Gornja Radgona have been abolished.

=== Population ===
Historical population
Year	Pop.	±%
1869	2,387	—
1880	2,534	+6.2%
1890	2,630	+3.8%
1900	2,569	−2.3%
1910	2,852	+11.0%
1923	2,218	−22.2%
1934	2,076	−6.4%
1939	2,004	−3.5%
1951	2,247	+12.1%
1961	2,040	−9.2%
1971	2,007	−1.6%
1981	1,745	−13.1%
1991	1,938	+11.1%
2001	1,599	−17.5%
2011	1,361	−14.9%

== Politics ==
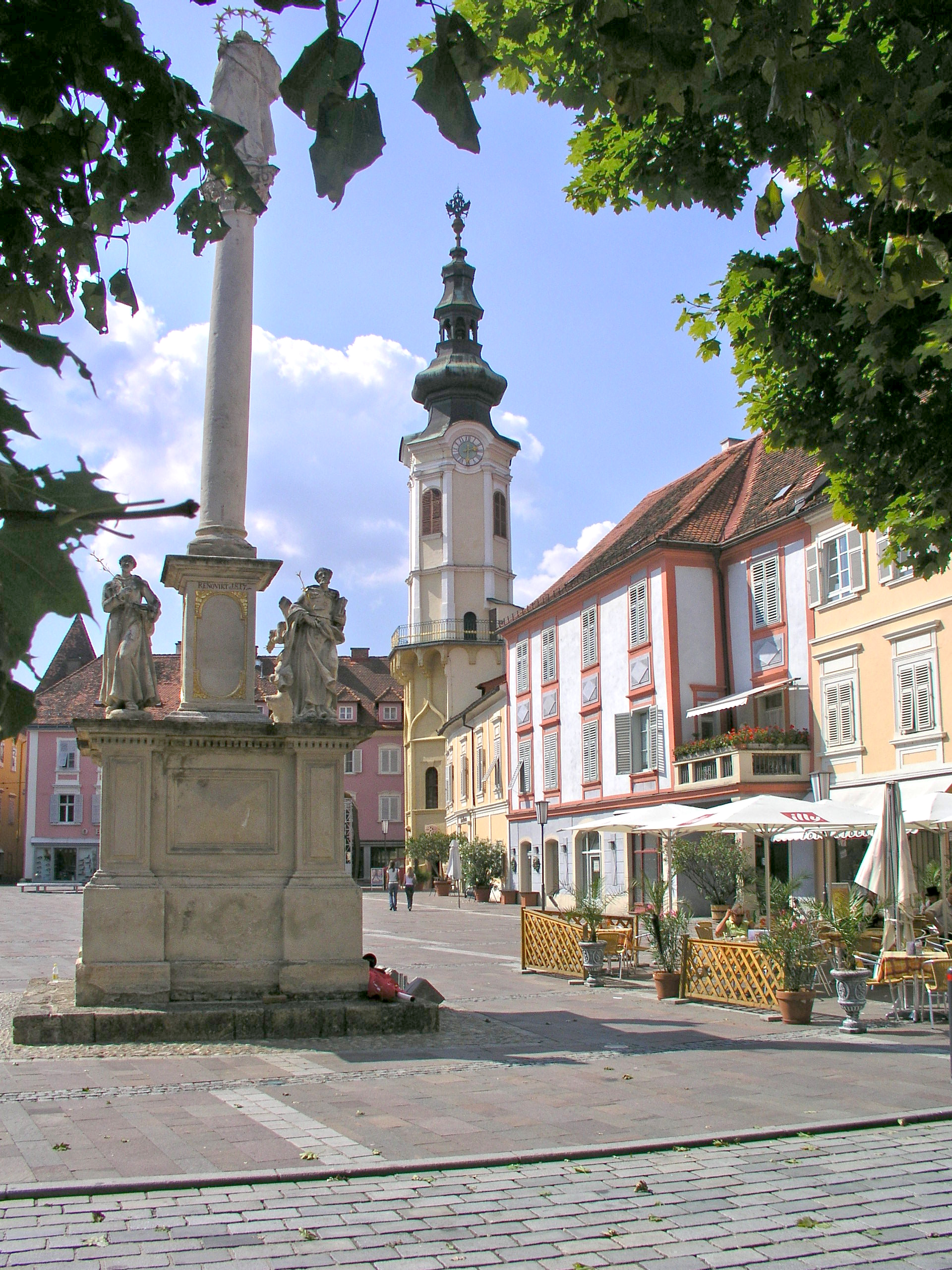
Main square and town hall

The municipal council (Gemeinderat) consists of 21 members. Following the 2025 Styrian local elections, the seat distribution is as follows:

- Austrian People's Party (ÖVP): 8 seats
- Freedom Party of Austria (FPÖ): 5 seats
- Social Democratic Party of Austria (SPÖ): 3 seats
- Citizens' List Bad Radkersburg: 2 seats
- The Greens – The Green Alternative: 2 seats
- NEOS - The New Austria and Liberal Forum (NEOS): 1 seat

The mayor of Bad Radkersburg is Karl Lautner (ÖVP).

== Twin towns ==
Bad Radkersburg is twinned with:

- Varaždin, Croatia
- Lenti, Hungary

== Notable people ==
- Andreas Walsperger (c.1415–?), German cartographer
- Franz Leopold von Nádasdy (1708–1783), Austrian field marshal and ban of Croatia
- Marie Egner (1850–1940), painter
- Leopold Vietoris (1891–2002), mathematician, WWI, veteran and supercentenarian
- Aribert Heim (1914–1992), SS doctor at the Mauthausen concentration camp
- Wolfgang Fasching (born 1967), cyclist
- Peter Luttenberger (born 1972), cyclist
