= August Winter =

Wehrmacht general (1897–1979)

- Born: 18 January 1897; Munich
- Died: 16 February 1979 (aged 82); Munich
- Military career
- Allegiance: German Empire; Weimar Republic; Nazi Germany
- Branch: German Army
- Service years: 1916–1945
- Rank: General der Gebirgstruppe
- Conflicts: World War I World War II

August Winter (born 18 January 1897, Munich – 16 February 1979) was a German officer and General of mountain troops in the German army during World War II, who served as Deputy Chief of the Wehrmacht Operations Staff.

== Career ==
Winter joined the Imperial German Army as an officer cadet in 1916 and was commissioned as a leutnant in 1917. He was awarded the Iron Cross second class in World War I. After 1918, he was retained in the Reichswehr. He was transferred to Munich, where he was promoted to Hauptmann in 1933 and Major in 1936. On 1 April 1939, he was promoted to Oberstleutnant and upon mobilization for World War II in the summer of 1939, he was appointed to the general staff of the army. In 1940, he was a staff officer of the Army Group South. In 1943 he became the Chief of staff of the 2nd Panzer Army and was appointed Generalmajor. In September 1943, he was stationed in Salonika as part of Army Group E. On 1 May 1945 was promoted to General der Gebirgstruppe.

In June 1946 Winter was questioned as a witness during the Nuremberg trials and then until his retirement was a researcher with the Gehlen Organization and German Federal Intelligence Service.

== Awards ==
- Iron Cross (1914)
  - 2nd Class
- Honour Cross of the World War 1914/1918
- Iron Cross (1939)
  - 2nd Class
  - 1st Class
- German Cross in Gold (22 June 1942)
