= Wend von Wietersheim =

German general (1900–1975)

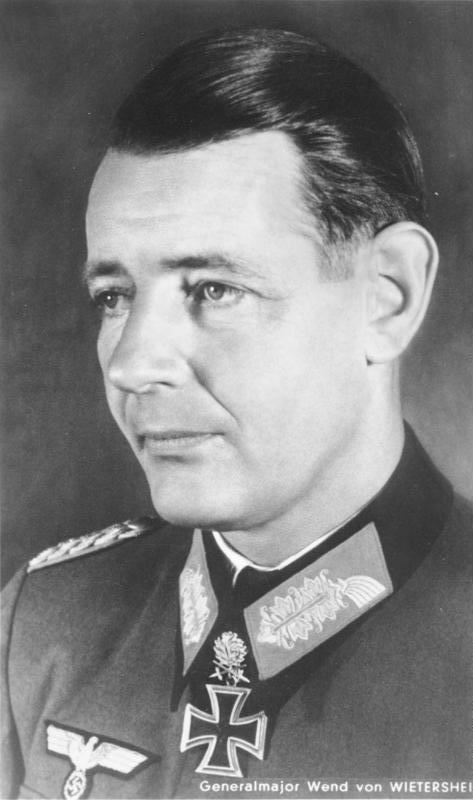
- Born: 18 April 1900; Neuland, Silesia, German Empire
- Died: 19 September 1975 (aged 75); Bad Honnef-Aegidienberg, West Germany
- Military career
- Allegiance: German Empire; Weimar Republic; Nazi Germany
- Branch: Prussian Army; Reichsheer; Army
- Service years: 1914–1945
- Rank: Generalleutnant
- Commands: 11th Panzer Division
- Conflicts: World War I World War II
- Awards: Knight's Cross of the Iron Cross with Oak Leaves and Swords

Wend von Wietersheim (18 April 1900 – 19 September 1975) was a German general in the Wehrmacht during World War II. He was a recipient of the Knight's Cross of the Iron Cross with Oak Leaves and Swords of Nazi Germany.

== Career ==
Wietersheim was born in 1900 into a family of the Chamberlain Walter von Wietersheim (1863–1919). Wietersheim served in World War I with the 4th (1st Silesian) Hussars "von Schill". He joined the Reichswehr of the Weimar Republic, serving in the cavalry. In 1938 he transferred to the Panzer (tank) force as an adjutant with the 3rd Panzer Division. With this unit he participated in the German invasion of Poland. Wietersheim took command of a motorcycle infantry battalion of the 1st Panzer Division. He led this battalion in the Battle of France.

Wietersheim was appointed commander of 113th Rifle Regiment of the 1st Panzer-Division on 20 July 1941, with which he took part in the invasion of the Soviet Union, Operation Barbarossa. The 1st Panzer Division was subordinated to Panzer Group 4 under the command of General Erich Hoepner operating on the northern sector of the Eastern Front. In late 1944, Wietersheim was in the south of France, commanding the 11th Panzer Division as it faced Allied amphibious landings near Toulon and Nice. Wietersheim surrendered to the US 90th Infantry Division in May 1945, in Czechoslovakia near the border with Bavaria.

== Awards ==
- Iron Cross (1914) 2nd Class (5 April 1919)
- Clasp to the Iron Cross (1939) 2nd Class (1 October 1939)
- Iron Cross (1939) 1st Class (20 May 1940)
- Panzer Badge in Silver
- Wound Badge in Black
- German Cross in Gold on 24 December 1941 as Oberstleutnant in Kradschützen-Bataillon 1
- Knight's Cross of the Iron Cross with Oak Leaves and Swords
  - Knight's Cross on 10 February 1942 as Oberstleutnant and commander of Schützen-Regiment 113
  - 176th Oak Leaves on 12 January 1943 as Oberst and commander of Panzergrenadier-Regiment 113
  - 58th Swords on 26 March 1944 as Generalmajor and commander of the 11. Panzer-Division

== See also ==
- Gustav Anton von Wietersheim
- Walter von Wietersheim

Military offices
Preceded by Generalleutnant Johann Mickl	Commander of 11th Panzer Division; 10 August 1943 – 10 April 1945	Succeeded by Generalmajor Horst Freiherr Treusch von Buttlar-Brandenfels
Preceded by General der Artillerie Helmuth Weidling	Commander of XXXXI Panzerkorps; 10 April 1945 – 19 April 1945	Succeeded by Generalleutnant Rudolf Holste
