= Ostrovskoy =

Ostrovskoy Островской
- Khutor
- Location within Volgograd Oblast Location within Russia
- Coordinates: 48°31′N 42°56′E
- Country: Russia
- Region: Volgograd Oblast
- District: Surovikinsky District
- Time zone: UTC+4:00

Ostrovskoy (Russian: Островской) is a rural locality (a khutor) in Sysoyevskoye Rural Settlement, Surovikinsky District, Volgograd Oblast, Russia. The population was 61 as of 2010. There are 2 streets.

== Geography ==
Ostrovskoy is located 22 km southeast of Surovikino (the district's administrative centre) by road. Blizhneossinovskiy is the nearest rural locality.
