= Radkersburg Umgebung =

- Former municipality
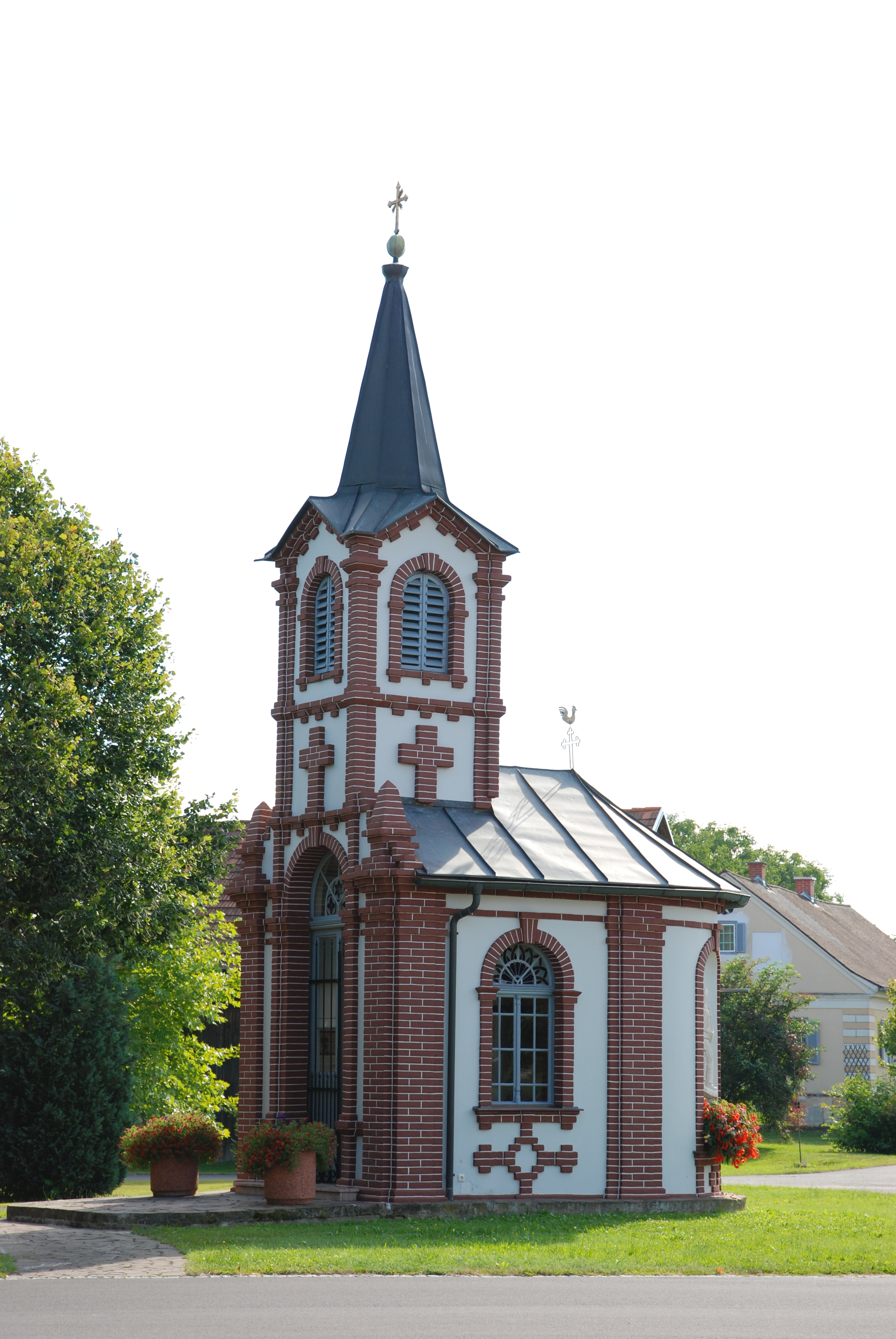
- Chapel in Sicheldorf (part of Radkersburg Umgebung)

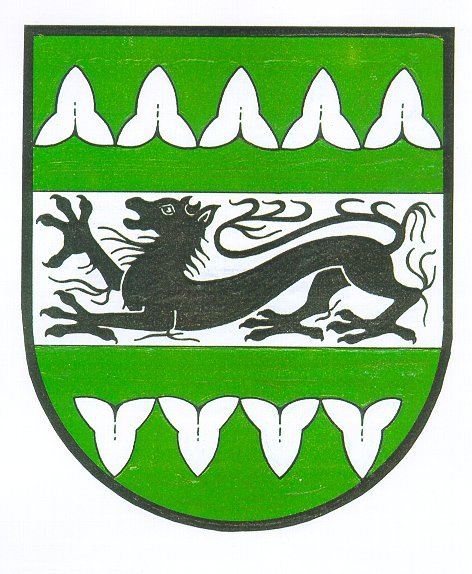
- Coat of arms

- Location within Austria
- Coordinates: 46°42′10″N 15°59′52″E
- Country: Austria
- State: Styria
- District: Südoststeiermark

Area
  - Total: 27.76 km^{2} (10.72 sq mi)
- Elevation: 210 m (690 ft)

Population (1 January 2016)
  - Total: 1,760
  - Density: 63.4/km^{2} (164/sq mi)
- Time zone: UTC+1 (CET)
  - Summer (DST): UTC+2 (CEST)
- Postal code: 8482, 8490, 8483
- Area code: 03474
- Vehicle registration: RA
- Website: www.radkersburg-umgebung.gv.at

Radkersburg Umgebung (Slovene: Žabakovci) is a former municipality in the district of Südoststeiermark in the Austrian state of Styria. Since the 2015 Styria municipal structural reform, it is part of the municipality Bad Radkersburg with combined population of 3158 inhabitants.

== Population ==
Historical population
Year	Pop.	±%
1869	1,805	—
1880	1,775	−1.7%
1890	1,959	+10.4%
1900	2,027	+3.5%
1910	2,218	+9.4%
1923	2,099	−5.4%
1934	2,074	−1.2%
1939	2,034	−1.9%
1951	2,024	−0.5%
1961	1,802	−11.0%
1971	1,948	+8.1%
1981	1,903	−2.3%
1991	1,793	−5.8%
2001	1,746	−2.6%
2012	1,760	+0.8%
