= 35th Division (Yugoslav Partisans) =

Yugoslav Partisan military division formed in 1944

35th Lika Division
- Flag of Democratic Federal Yugoslavia (used by the Partisans)
- Active: 1944–1945
- Country: Democratic Federal Yugoslavia
- Allegiance: Yugoslav Partisans
- Branch: Yugoslav Partisan Army
- Type: Infantry
- Size: 2,262 (upon formation)
- Engagements: World War II in Yugoslavia

The 35th Lika Assault Division (Tridesetpeta lička udarna divizija) was a Yugoslav Partisan division formed on 30 January 1944. It was formed from the 1st and 2nd Lika Brigades of Operational Staff for Lika. Lika Partisan Detachment, Plavi Jadran Battalion and an Artillery divizion were also part of the division upon formation, at the time it had 2,262 fighters. It was part of thee 11th Corps and it operated in territory controlled by Independent State of Croatia.
