= Battle of Saumur =

Battle of Saumur may refer to:

- Battle of Saumur (1793)
- Battle of Saumur (1940)
