= Ecochard =

Ecochard or Écochard is a French surname. Notable people with the surname include:

- Henri Ecochard (1923–2020), French military officer
- Michel Écochard (1905–1985), French architect and urban planner
