= Jean-Martial Bineau =

French engineer and politician (1805–1855)

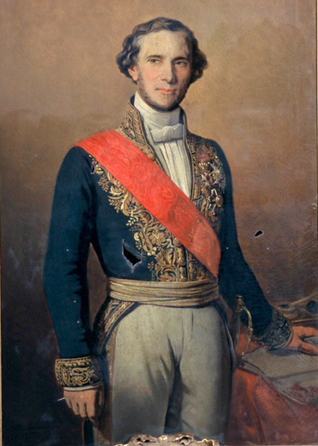
- Jean-Martial Bineau by Charles-Philippe Larivière
- Born: 18 May 1805; Gennes, Maine-et-Loire, France
- Died: 8 August 1855 (aged 50); Chatou, Seine-et-Oise, France
- Occupations: Engineer, Politician

Jean-Martial Bineau (18 May 1805 – 8 September 1855) was a French engineer and politician who promoted the early development of railways in France. He was Minister of Public Works during the French Second Republic, and served as Minister of Finance from 1852 to 1855 under the Emperor Napoleon III. He pushed through measures to increase revenues and contain expenditures in the face of opposition from the legislature.

== Early years ==
Jean-Martial Bineau was born in Gennes, Maine-et-Loire, on 28 Floreal year XIII (18 May 1805), son of Jean René Bineau (1767–1814) and Adelaide Papot (1770–1850). His father had studied medicine, then became commander of the National Guard of Gennes in 1790–91, lieutenant of the grenadiers in 1792 and Commissioner of the Departmental Management Board from 1797 to 1800.

Bineau studied at Saumur, Angers and Paris. In 1824 he was admitted to the École Polytechnique. He moved on to the School of Mines in 1826, and at the age of 25 became a chief engineer. He specialized in the manufacture of iron. He visited England in 1840 and published a book on the English railways. He vigorously lobbied for giving France a network of railways along the English model. In 1841 he was elected a deputy for Angers with 80% of the vote.

== Second Republic ==
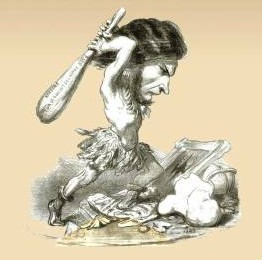
Cartoon by Honoré Daumier decrying Bineau's 1848 report on the Fine Arts Budget

After the February Revolution of 1848, by a decree of 30 March 1848 Bineau was appointed special commissioner for the railway companies of Orléans and Centre, which were both in receivership. Bineau was elected to the Constituent Assembly later that year, where he voted for the Constitution of the French Second Republic. In 1848 Bineau also taught general and statistical economics at the School of Administration.

Bineau was reelected to the Legislative Assembly in 1849, where he supported all the measures of the Bonapartists in the legislature. He participated in the work of the Finance committee. He reported on a draft law of 6 June 1848 on nationalization of the railways, proposed by Duclerc, the Minister of Finance. He was strongly opposed to the measure. He was also involved in debate about the amended budget submitted by Duclerc on 28 September 1848 which called for a drastic reduction of staff in all ministerial departments.

Bineau was given the portfolio of Minister of Public Works on 31 October 1849. In this role he continued to promote development of the railways. He implemented a policy favorable to railway companies that gave them long-term concessions so they could extend the amortization period of shares and bonds issued to finance the work, and encouraged development of secondary lines. He resigned after General Changarnier was dismissed on 9 January 1851. Bineau supported the coup of 2 December 1851 which led to the restoration of the Empire.

== Second Empire - Minister of Finance ==
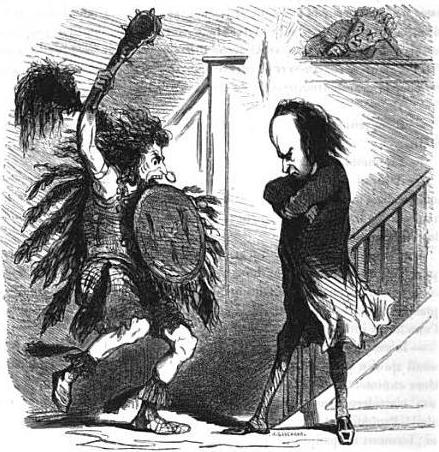
Bineau as an "Ioway" and Victor Hugo, after a reduction of the budget of the Beaux-Arts

After the coup Bineau supported Louis Napoleon Bonaparte and became a member of the Consultative Commission. He was appointed Minister of Finance on 22 January 1852. He replaced Achille Fould, who had resigned after the decree confiscating the property of the House of Orléans. During his tenure Bineau tried to restore fiscal balance by reducing the state's deficits and debts, and by calling for public loans.

On 3 March 1852 Bineau reached an agreement with the Bank of France over extending the terms of repayment of loans made to the Treasury. On 14 March 1852 he obtained a reduction in debt payments by offering creditors a choice between repayment at par or accepting a reduction of interest from 5% to 4.5%, secured for ten years. Almost all of the debt was converted to the lower rate. On 17 March 1852 a budget was set for the remainder of 1852 without being submitted to the newly elected legislature. Although a deficit was forecast, the budget included a large increase in indirect taxation that was expected to generate a major reduction in the deficit by the end of the fiscal year.

The budget for 1853 was smaller than that of 1852, but still showed a deficit of 43 million. The effect of the debt conversion was offset by an eight-fold increase in the salary of the President of the Republic (Note: Louis Napoleon was President of the republic until the end of 1852, when he was proclaimed Emperor Napoleon III after a plebiscite.) and an increase in the floating debt, rising from 630 million on 1 April 1852 to 891 million by year end. The budget was voted on 8 July 1852, but only after a stand-off between the government and the legislative body which was to cause a reduction of the power of the legislature to allocate the budget. The legislature also forfeited the right to control commercial treaties and special appropriations for major public works. On 23 December 1852 Bineau told the senate it was for the legislature to vote for the tax, but for the Government to decide how to best use the revenue.

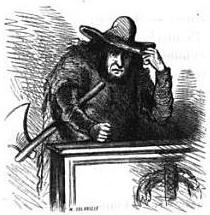
Bineau as a butcher, cartoon by Cham

By an act of 6 May 1852 all coins were to be withdrawn from circulation, some of which dated to the 17th century, and replaced by standard new copper coinage. The Crédit Foncier de France was authorized by decree of 28 February 1852, but ran into difficulty and on 6 July 1854 was placed under the authority of the Minister of Finance. The Crédit Mobilier was created by a decree of 18 November 1852 as an investment bank to promote development of industry and public works. On 7 February 1853 Bineau reported that the financial position of the Empire was good. Budget deficits were reduced, tax revenues increased and the floating debt had declined. The 1854 budget showed an increase in revenues and a smaller increase in spending. The budget was passed, but the government was criticized by the "budgetarians" for overspending and for its links to the business community.

A revised law on civil service pensions was passed on 9 June 1853. On 8 March 1854 a bill was passed to float a loan to fund the expenses of the Crimean War. The loan was raised through issuance of bonds to the public, an innovation. Demand greatly exceed the amount required. To meet payments on the war bonds, the 1855 budget had to increase the floating debt, and was passed with difficulty. A second war loan was authorized on 31 December 1854, and was again successful. The size of subscriptions was limited to encourage large numbers of small subscriptions by the supporters of the emperor. With deteriorating health, by the end of 1854 Beneau was forced to hand over control of the Finance ministry to Baroche.

== Final year ==
Bineau was made a senator on 27 March 1852. He chaired the General Council of Maine-et-Loire from 1852 to 1855. He resigned from the Finance ministry on 3 February 1855. He was made Inspector General of Mines. Napoleon paid a tribute to Bineau in a letter published in the Moniteur on the day of his resignation. Early in 1855 Bineau was forced to spend time in the south of France due to health problems. He returned to Paris for the summer, then moved to Chatou, Yvelines. He died in Chatou on 8 September 8, 1855, aged 50.

== Sources ==
- Antonetti, G.; Cardoni, F.; Oliveira, M. de (2008). "Bineau (Jean Martial)". Les ministres des Finances de la Révolution française au Second Empire. Histoire économique et financière - XIXe-XXe. Institut de la gestion publique et du développement économique. pp. 363–401. ISBN 9782821828278.
- "Bineau, Jean-Martial" (PDF). Centre national de la recherche scientifique. Archived from the original (PDF) on 2014-01-12.
- "Bineau (Jean-Martial)". IGPDE. Archived from the original on 2014-01-11.
- "Jean-Martial Bineau (1805–1855)". Gennes.
- Pickering, Mary (2009-09-14). Auguste Comte: Volume 2: An Intellectual Biography. Cambridge University Press. ISBN 978-0-521-51325-8.
