= Wolf Hagemann =

- Born: 20 July 1898
- Died: 12 September 1983 (aged 85)
- Military career
- Allegiance: German Empire; Weimar Republic; Nazi Germany
- Branch: German Army
- Service years: 1916–1945
- Rank: Generalleutnant
- Commands: 336th Infantry Division; 541th Volksgrenadier Division; XLVIII Panzer Corps
- Conflicts: World War I; World War II; Invasion of Poland; Operation Weserübung; Battles of Narvik; Operation Barbarossa; Crimean Campaign (1941–1942); Siege of Sevastopol (1941–1942); Siege of Leningrad; Crimean Offensive (1944); East Prussian Offensive
- Awards: Knight's Cross of the Iron Cross with Oak Leaves

Wolf Hagemann (20 July 1898 – 12 September 1983) was a German general during World War II. He was a recipient of the Knight's Cross of the Iron Cross with Oak Leaves of Nazi Germany.

== War crimes ==
On 2 September 1944 the 541th division of the Wehrmacht commanded by Hagemann executed altogether 448 Polish civilians, mainly women, elders and infants as young as 6 months old, during the pacification of Lipniak-Majorat village. The 541th division executed civilians in revenge for military activity of Polish Underground

== Awards and decorations ==
- Knight's Cross of the Iron Cross with Oak Leaves
  - Knight's Cross on 4 September 1940 as Oberstleutnant and commander of III./Gebirgsjäger-Regiment 139
  - Oak Leaves on 4 June 1944 as Generalmajor and commander of 336. Infanterie-Division

Military offices
Preceded by Generalmajor Wilhelm Kunze	Commander of 336. Infanterie-Division; 8 December 1943 - May 1944	Succeeded by none
Preceded by General der Panzertruppe Maximilian Reichsfreiherr von Edelsheim	Commander of XLVIII. Panzerkorps; 31 March 1945 - 8 May 1945	Succeeded by none
