= Maximilian von Edelsheim =

German general

- Born: 6 July 1897; Berlin, German Empire
- Died: 26 April 1994 (aged 96); Konstanz, Germany
- Military career
- Allegiance: German Empire; Weimar Republic; Nazi Germany
- Branch: German Army
- Service years: 1914–1945
- Rank: General der Panzertruppe
- Commands: XLVIII Panzer Corps
- Conflicts: World War I World War II
- Awards: Knight's Cross of the Iron Cross with Oak Leaves and Swords

Maximilian von Edelsheim (6 July 1897 – 26 April 1994) was a general in the Wehrmacht of Nazi Germany during World War II. He was a recipient of the Knight's Cross of the Iron Cross with Oak Leaves and Swords. He received the Oak Leaves for his leadership of the 26th Panzer Grenadier Regiment of the 24th Panzer Division. Edelsheim was flown out of the Stalingrad Pocket before the city's fall in order to form a new 24th Panzer Division in France.

He negotiated the surrender of German forces to the Americans at the bridge at Tangermünde on the Elbe River on or about May 2, 1945. The German 12th Army, under General Walther Wenck had previously done a 180 degree turn away from the Western Allies, resulting from an order to relieve Berlin from the Soviet attack. Disobeying the order, Wenck fought due East, into the Spree Forest region, toward the town of Halbe and linked up with the remnants of the German 9th Army. They then reversed and went west, back to the Elbe. There, Edelsheim crossed the Elbe on a schwimmwagen and negotiated the surrender of all German forces on the West side of the Elbe to the Americans. He was taken prisoner by the Americans and released in 1947.

== Awards ==
- Iron Cross (1914) 2nd Class (27 November 1915) & 1st Class (26 October 1918)
- Knight, 2nd Class of Order of the Zähringer Lion with Swords 2nd Class (19 September 1939) & 1st Class (14 October 1939)
- Knight's Cross of the Iron Cross with Oak Leaves and Swords
  - Knight's Cross on 30 July 1941 as Oberstleutnant and commander of Radfahr-Abteilung 1
  - Oak Leaves on 23 December 1942 as Oberst and commander of Panzergrenadier-Regiment 26
  - Swords on 23 October 1944 as Generalleutnant and commander of 24. Panzer-Division

Military offices
Preceded by Generalleutnant Arno von Lenski	Commander of 24. Panzerdivision; March 1943 – August 1944	Succeeded by Generalmajor Gustav-Adolf von Nostitz-Wallwitz
Preceded by General der Panzertruppe Fritz-Hubert Gräser	Commander of XLVIII. Panzerkorps; 20 September 1944 – 31 March 1945	Succeeded by Generalleutnant Wolf Hagemann
