= Gustav-Adolf von Nostitz-Wallwitz =

- Born: 11 July 1898; Oschatz
- Died: 31 May 1945 (aged 46); Eckernförde
- Military career
- Allegiance: German Empire (to 1918); Weimar Republic (to 1933); Nazi Germany
- Branch: Army (Wehrmacht)
- Service years: 1917–1945
- Rank: Generalmajor
- Commands: 24th Panzer Division
- Conflicts: World War I World War II: Battle of France; Operation Barbarossa; Battle of Białystok–Minsk; Battle of Kiev (1941); Battle of Voronezh (1942); Battle of Stalingrad; Dnieper–Carpathian Offensive; First Jassy–Kishinev Offensive; Battle of Debrecen; East Prussian Offensive; Heiligenbeil Pocket
- Awards: Knight's Cross of the Iron Cross

Gustav-Adolf von Nostitz-Wallwitz (11 July 1898 – 31 May 1945) was a general in the Wehrmacht of Nazi Germany during World War II.

== Biography ==
Gustav Adolf was born into the collateral branch of an old, noble House of Nostitz, as the son of Max von Nostitz-Wallwitz (d. 1911), Oberstleutnant, and his wife, Helene von Minckwitz (d. 1945). He was a recipient of the Knight's Cross of the Iron Cross. Nostitz-Wallwitz was wounded in March 1945 in the Heiligenbeil Pocket, he was evacuated to a hospital in Eckernförde and died on 31 May 1945.

== Awards and decorations ==
- German Cross in Gold on 1 December 1941 as Oberstleutnant in reitendes Artillerie-Regiment 1
- Knight's Cross of the Iron Cross on 12 June 1944 as Oberst and commander of Panzer-Artillerie-Regiment 89

Military offices
Preceded by General der Panzertruppe Maximilian Reichsfreiherr von Edelsheim	Commander of 24. Panzer-Division; 1 August 1944 – 25 March 1945	Succeeded by Major Rudolf von Knebel-Döberitz
