= 541st Volksgrenadier Division =

German Army unit in World War II

The 541st Volksgrenadier Division (German: 541. Volksgrenadier-Division) was a volksgrenadier infantry division of the German Army during World War II, active from 1944 to 1945.

The division was established on 10 July 1944 at the Neustettin military training area in Pomerania under the designation Sperr-Division 541. On 17 July 1944, the division was renamed as the 541st Grenadier Division. At the beginning of September 1944 responsible for mass-execution of around 450 Polish civilians in Lipniak-Majorat. On 9 October 1944, it was renamed 541. Volks-Grenadier-Division.

At that time, the division was located at the Narew river. From November 1944 to January 1945, the division had to retreat from the Narew, and fought in the area of Osowiec, where it suffered heavy losses. The division retreated via Rastenburg, Korschen and Bartenstein towards Frisches Haff. The remnants of the division were surrounded in the Heiligenbeil Pocket.

Its commander was Generalleutnant Wolf Hagemann.

== Sources ==
- 541. Grenadier-Division
- 541. Volks-Grenadier-Division
