= 24th Panzer Division =

WW2 German Army division

- 24. Panzer-Division
- Unit insignia 1943
- Active: 28 November 1941 – 8 May 1945
- Country: Nazi Germany
- Branch: German Army
- Type: Panzer
- Role: Armoured warfare
- Size: Division
- Garrison/HQ: Wehrkreis III: Frankfurt an der Oder in former East Germany
- Engagements: Battle of France; Operation Barbarossa; Case Blue; Battle of Stalingrad

Commanders
- Notable commanders: General of the Cavalry (Germany) Kurt Feldt

Insignia
- Insignia 1941–1942

- Insignia 1943–1945

The 24th Panzer Division was formed in late 1941 from the 1st Cavalry Division based at Königsberg.

The division fought on the Eastern Front from June 1942 to January 1943, when it was destroyed in the battle of Stalingrad. Reformed, it once more returned to the Eastern Front in late 1943 and remained there until surrender to Soviet forces in May 1945.

== Service ==
The 1st Cavalry Division was formed shortly after the outbreak of World War II, in November 1939, when the 1st Cavalry Brigade was expanded to division-size.

The division was part of the German invasion of the northern Netherlands where it encountered only weak defences as it was not a strategically important area. After the Dutch surrender, the division took part in the final actions of the battle of France before serving as an occupation force there and, from September 1940, in Poland. It participated in the German invasion of the Soviet Union, Operation Barbarossa, where it was part of the Army Group Center before being sent back to East Prussia for conversion to a tank division.

After initially being stationed in northern France the division served under the Fourth Panzer Army in Army Group South of the Eastern Front from June 1942. The division participated in the capture of Voronezh and, in late December 1942, was encircled in the Battle of Stalingrad and destroyed.

The 24th Panzer Division was reformed in March 1943 and served in Normandy, Italy, and then went back to the Eastern Front where it suffered heavy casualties in around Kiev and the Dniepr Bend.

On 20 November 1943, the 24th Panzer Division possessed 57 tanks (of which 34 were operational).

During spring-1944 it took part in the battle of Târgu Frumos, part of the First Jassy-Kishinev Offensive. On 25 April 1944, it was in the second line between Podu Iloaiei and Iași, behind the 46th, 3rd, 18th, 79th, 23rd Panzer and 5th Divisions. Near the end of the war, it saw action in Poland, Hungary, and Slovakia. Parts of the division were evacuated to Schleswig-Holstein and surrendered there to British forces at the end of the war while the remainder surrendered to Soviet forces in East Prussia in May 1945.

In keeping with the Division's mounted origins, the 24th Panzer's tank crewmen wore the golden-yellow Waffenfarbe of the cavalry rather than Panzer pink.

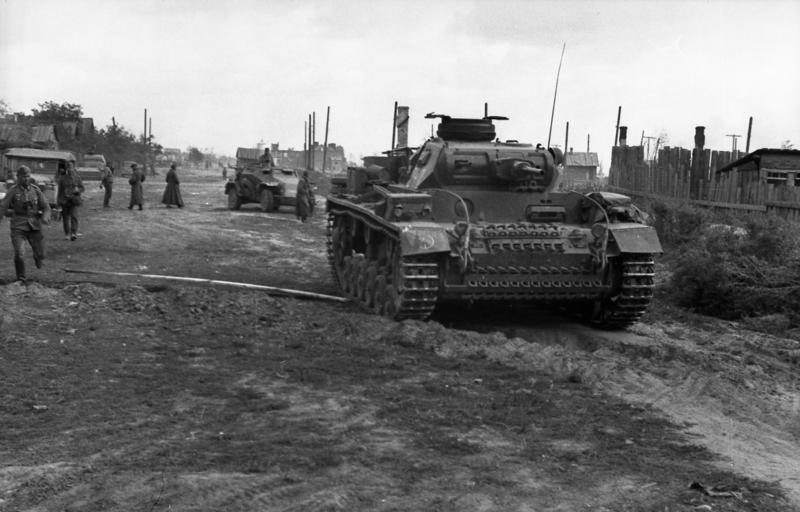
A Panzer III of the 24th Panzer Division in Stalingrad.

== Commanders ==
The commanders of the division:

- General Kurt Feldt (28 November 1941 – 15 April 1942)
- Generalleutnant Bruno Ritter von Hauenschild (15 April 1942 – 12 September 1942)
- Generalmajor Arno von Lenski (12 September 1942 – 31 January 1943)
- General Maximilian Reichsfreiherr von Edelsheim (1 March 1943 – 1 August 1944)
- Generalmajor Gustav-Adolf von Nostitz-Wallwitz (1 August 1944 – 25 March 1945)
- Major Rudolf von Knebel-Döberitz (25 March 1945 – 8 May 1945)

== See also ==
- List of German divisions in World War II
- Panzer division
