= Battle of Saumur (1940) =

Part of World War II

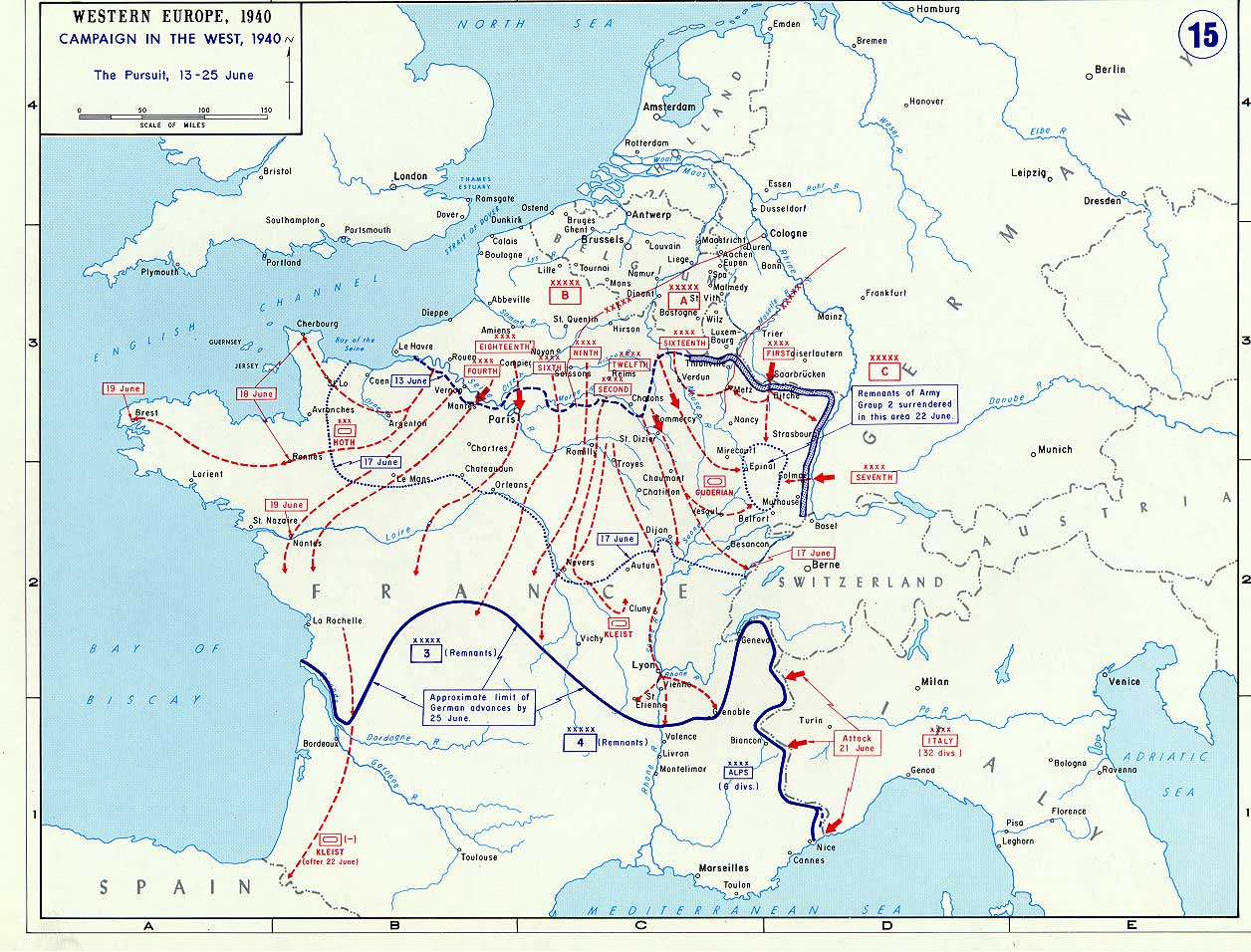
- Fall Rot, June 1940
Date	18–20 June 1940
Location	Saumur, Gennes, and Montsoreau 47°15′36″N 00°04′37″E
Result	French tactical victory

Belligerents
France	Germany

Commanders and leaders
(French Third Republic) Charles Michon	(Nazi Germany) Kurt Feldt

Strength
2,500 men unknown number of artillery pieces 24 tanks or armored vehicles	c. 10,000 then 40,000; 300 artillery pieces 150 tanks or armored vehicles

Casualties and losses
250 killed or wounded 200 prisoners 2 tanks destroyed	132 killed ~300 wounded 9 tanks destroyed

The Battle of Saumur occurred during the last stages of the Battle of France during World War II, when officer cadets from the Cavalry School at Saumur, led by superintendent Colonel Charles Michon, made a defensive stand along the Loire River at Saumur, Gennes, and Montsoreau. For two days the Cavalry School, and other assorted units which had fallen back before the German Wehrmacht advance, held off a German attack. Since the battle occurred after the message by Marshal Pétain which called for an end to fighting (on 17 June 1940), the event is often considered one of the first acts of the French Resistance.

== Prelude ==
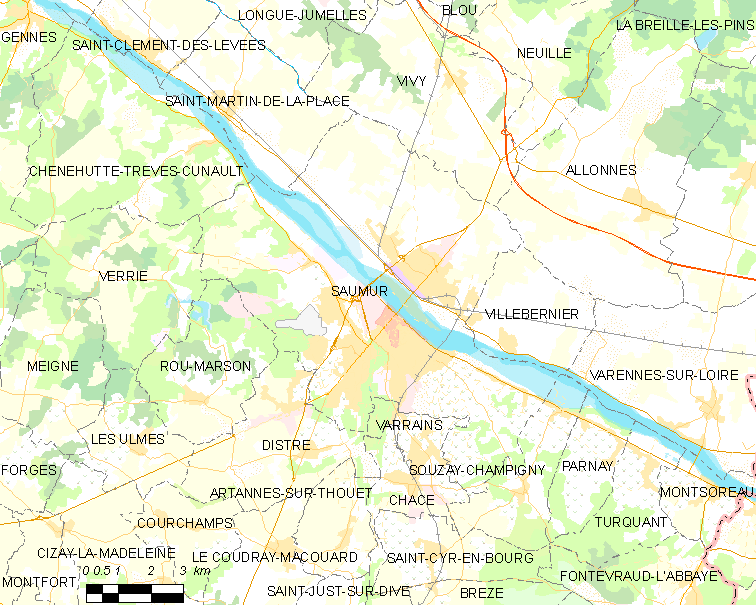
Modern map of the vicinity of Saumur (commune FR insee code 49328)

In the first week of June 1940, in accordance with instructions by General Maxime Weygand to delay German Wehrmacht army units, Colonel Michon issued contingency orders for the cadets to take up defensive positions along the southern bank of the Loire, not that there was any likelihood of Germans getting to the Loire.

On 8/9 June there was an air raid against Saumur railway station, which killed three people. A further air raid at nearby Souzay took place on 13 June.

On 13 June Paris was declared an open city and a meeting of the Anglo-French Supreme War Council with Churchill and the French Prime Minister Paul Reynaud was taking place in Tours, on the Loire. On 14 June the French government left Tours and fled to Bordeaux, Wehrmacht troops entered Paris. On 15 June Reynaud resigned and Philippe Pétain became prime minister. Next morning, through the Spanish ambassador, Pétain asked Germany for a cease fire and announced this fact over the radio.

=== Forces ===
The Wehrmacht troops advancing south across France into the area of Saumur were from the 1st Cavalry Division. The battle therefore set graduates of the German cavalry school against cadets from the French cavalry school. They had advanced at 45–60 miles a day. The Germans had 10,000 troops, some motorised, armoured cars, artillery and the usual divisional equipment, whereas the French troops comprised 800 of the younger cadets who had joined the school three months earlier (older cadets having been assigned as junior officers of regiments); teachers who had not already joined their normal units; and any retreating men that could be collected.

One of the annual war games played by the students at the Cavalry School was to organise a defence along the Loire River, covering four bridges and a front of 40 kilometres (25 mi). The 1940 game would be at this location, but with live bullets. The French army manual required 80,000 men and several divisional artillery units to cover a 40 km front, the students comprised just 780, although they had acquired rifles, ten old 25 mm guns, 35 machine guns, three World War I-era armoured cars, four 81 mm mortars, seven 60 mm mortars, and two 75 mm artillery pieces by 18 June 1940. By the time battle took place, by acquiring retreating soldiers and some additional units, including 200 Algerian riflemen, 450 men from an armoured warfare training centre, and 210 men from the 1st Groupe Franc under Capitaine Robert de Neuchèze who arrived with five Hotchkiss H39 tanks and three Panhard 178 armoured cars, Michon had 2,190 men lined up to face 10,000 German troops.

=== Defences ===
The front comprised to the west, the town of Gennes on the south bank, with double suspension bridges connecting the north via an island. The north bank comprised a levee, which extended east for the whole of the 40 km front, behind which is a lower old flood plain. Small villages built into the southern bank cliffs, overlooking the river and a number of islands in the river, filled the 20 km until Saumur which had another double bridge of stone via the Offard island which is 1.5 km by 0.5 km and was covered in buildings, overlooked by the ancient Château de Saumur. A rail line over a bridge just to the east of Saumur entered a tunnel into the cliffs on the south bank. Another 20 km further east, along which there were a number of small villages, also built into the cliffs overlooking the river and more small islands is the town of Montsoreau with a truss road bridge across the river.

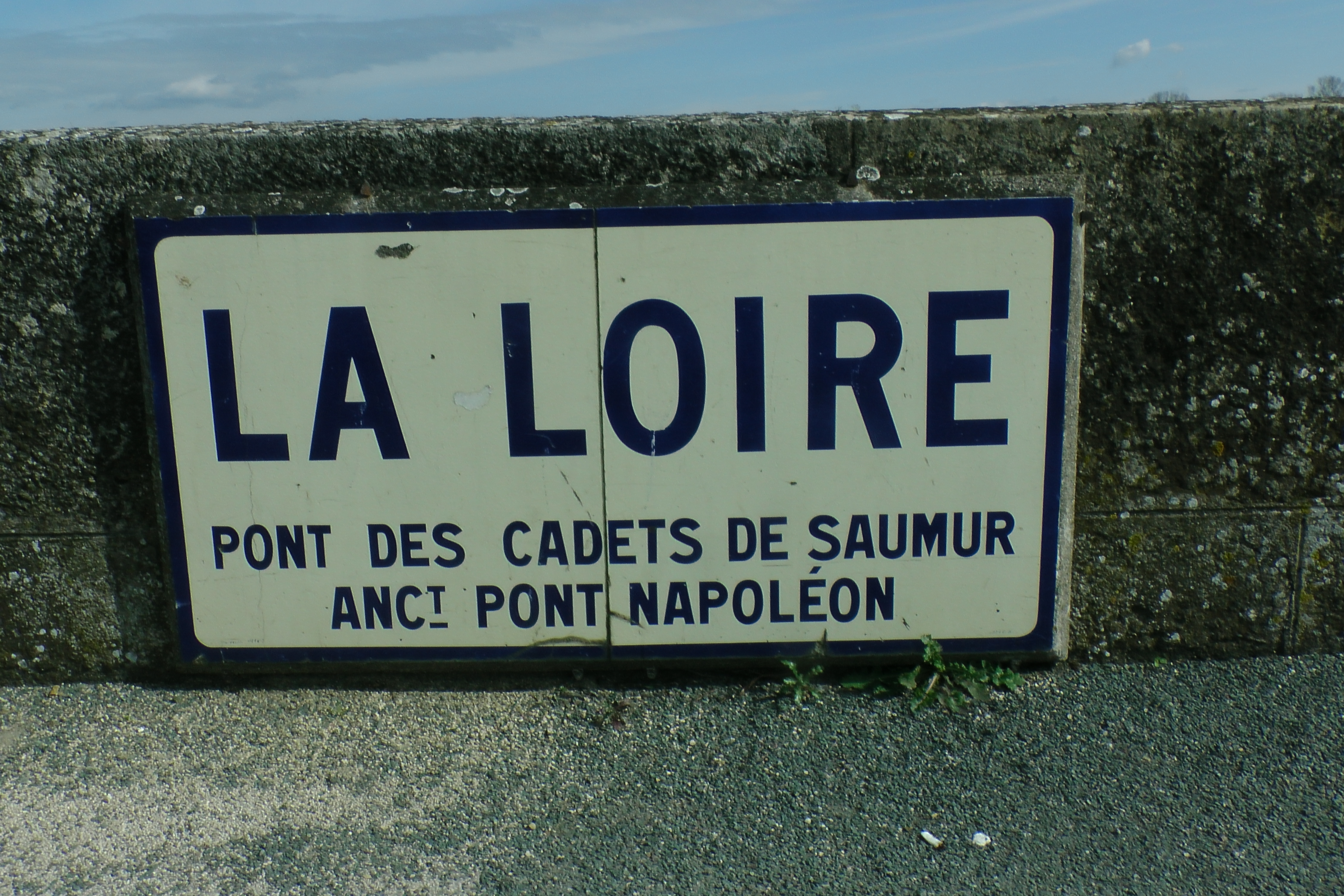
Pont des Cadets de Saumur sign

Preparations were made to destroy the four bridges, over which refugees were streaming south. Sappers from 6th Engineers based at Angers arrived with lorries loaded with explosives. Barricades were set up and fighting pits dug. The students and troops were allocated into groups of around 20 students called a Brigade. Four or five brigades made a Troop. Each Brigade had a task, some being static and others in reserve were given transport so they could rush to threatened areas. Each bridge was given one Brigade, a section of tirailleurs, a 25mm cannon, two mortars and a heavy machine gun. Between each bridge were two Troops. Communications were established using the civilian telephone system and some old radios. Sadly for the defenders, the river level had recently fallen revealing multiple sand banks and small islands.

Men and materials not required for the defence were evacuated south, as were 800 horses belonging to the Cavalry School and the world-famous Cadre Noir, together with their saddles and ceremonial harnesses. Refugees crossing the river were also sent further south. A reconnaissance unit was sent north to try to locate the enemy. The Mayor of Saumur was not sure they wanted to be defended; all towns with a population of over 20,000 had been declared open. Saumur, now full of refugees, possibly qualified, but the army would not countenance making the town open or allowing the population to evacuate. Petain had not received a reply from the Germans and sent a message contradicting a previous message, saying that France had not abandoned the struggle nor laid down arms. Saumur therefore prepared for a siege. On 18 June at 9pm a telephone call was received at the HQ Les Grandes Brises, 800m east of the Chateau de Saumur, warning that the Germans were 20 km north of Saumur.

== Battle ==
=== Centre ===
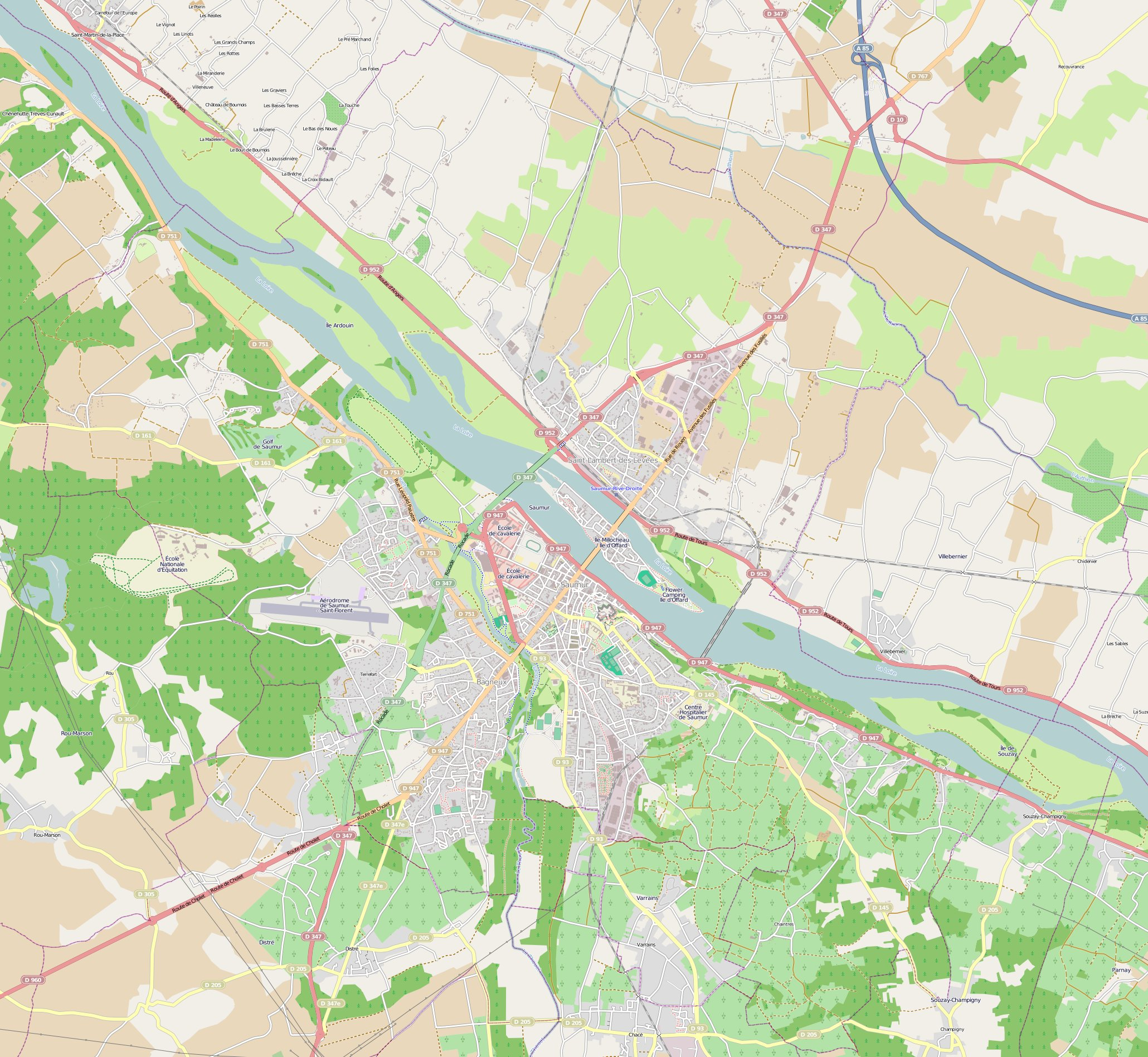
Modern map of Saumur

The lead elements of the Wehrmacht 1st Cavalry Division, the only horsed cavalry division in the German army (all others having converted to armoured cars and tanks), arrived at the river at Saumur just before midnight on 18 June. Reconnaissance units riding motorcycles with sidecars arrived first, followed by armoured cars. A 25 mm gun manned by Cadet Hoube scored the first hit. It was the start of the battle that was to continue until 20 June. The French blew the Pont Napoleon at Saumur just after midnight, the Montsoreau bridge at 1:15 am and 1,700 kilos of melinite destroyed the railway bridge to the east of Saumur at 3:00 am.

At dawn on the 19th, a German staff car approached the destroyed Saumur bridge and a German and a French officer got out and approached the bridge under a white flag. The French opened fire for unknown reasons, the car was destroyed and the two officers lay dead. The Germans brought up artillery to bombard the town. 2,000 shells hit Saumur over the next two days. A number of ancient buildings were destroyed, the civil population suffered casualties and hid in the cellars and wine caves. Telephone lines were cut to the HQ and it was too exposed to shellfire, so that evening it relocated 3 km west to Auberge de Marsoleau, near the airfield. Fighting continued throughout the day with cadets on the island firing at any targets offered. The 25 mm gun on the island scored nine more hits on armoured vehicles.

The morning of the 20th was strangely quiet; some students crossed from the island to the north bank and found it deserted, the Germans were presumed to have gone east or west to effect crossings elsewhere. Several French died on the north bank taking the battle to the Germans, including Lt Gérard de Buffévent, who was posthumously awarded the Légion d'Honneur.

=== West ===
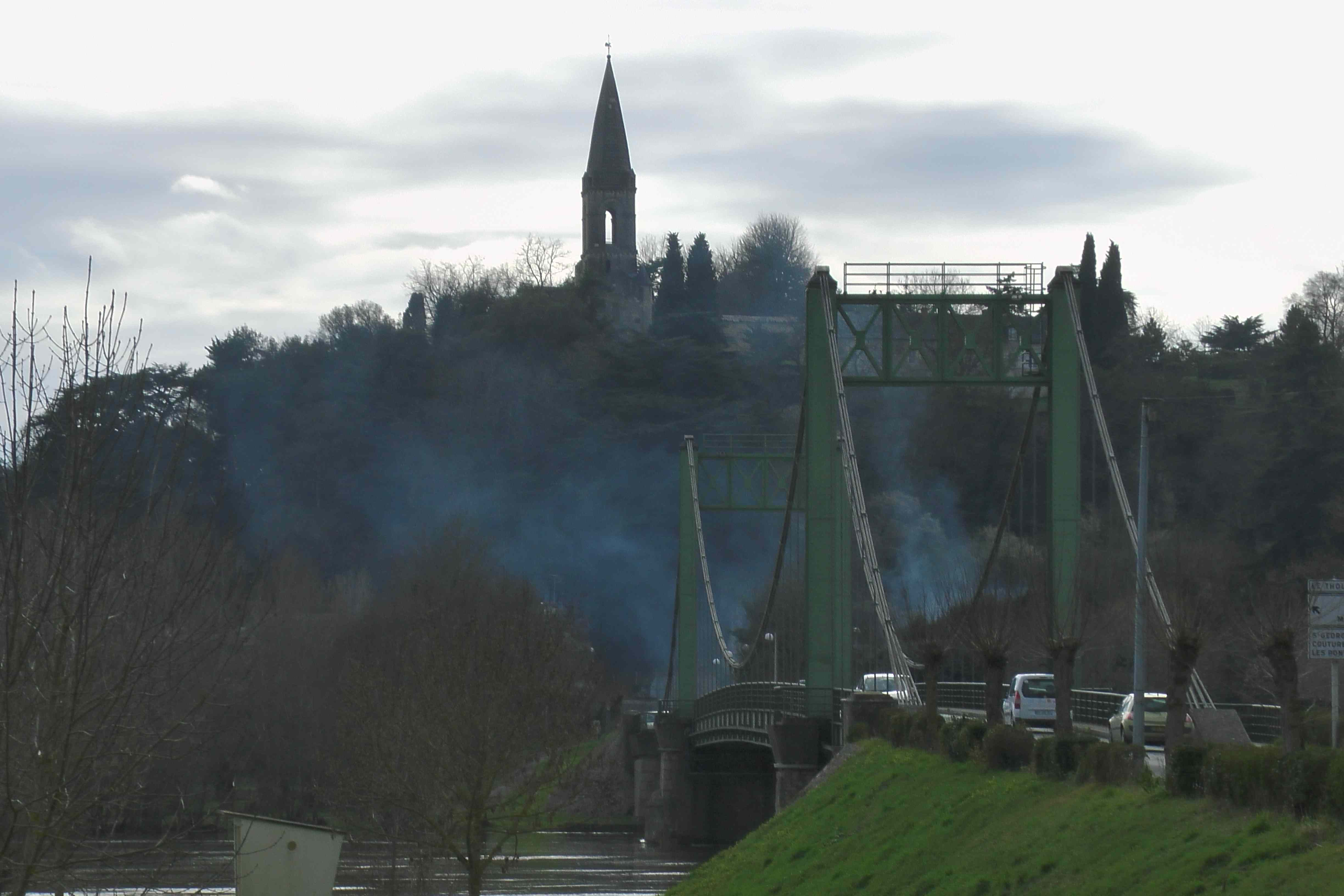
Gennes and St Eusèbe

At Gennes, to the west of Saumur, there was no sign of combat troops until the 19th when Wehrmacht scouts arrived in the afternoon and early evening. As motor cyclists approached, the suspension bridge to the north of the island was blown. The 11th century church of St Eusèbe, on the high ground overlooking the bridge was an excellent view point and a good location for another of the 25 mm guns, however at 8pm on of 19 June, 50 German troop carriers arrived on the north bank packed with assault troops. Artillery began to bombard the island and Gennes, destroying the tower of St Eusèbe and setting buildings in the town on fire. The Wehrmacht then assaulted the island in the river using rubber boats but were repelled by the Cadets and Algerian riflemen by midnight. An engineer, worried that his charges might be damaged by another bombardment, without orders, blew the southern bridge, isolating the troops on the island. The wounded had to be evacuated by boat.

Early next morning on the 20th, having been reinforced and with more artillery, the Wehrmacht used rafts and boats to overwhelm the few defenders on the island when their ammunition had run out, but they were unable to cross from the island to the south bank of the Loire, which was still strongly defended by four units of cadets.

Moving westward downriver, the Germans looked for an alternative crossing point, identifying a gap that was only lightly held. There, despite students arriving and inflicting casualties on the Germans, the Wehrmacht managed to establish a small bridgehead on the south shore.

Other Wehrmacht moving further west towards Angers, managed to find a point at which they could force a crossing against a different French defending unit and captured the city of Angers.

Whilst reinforcements were approaching Gennes to repel the German bridgehead, yet another German bridgehead was established between Gennes and Saumur, threatening to take the town from the rear. The reinforcements were diverted to this new threat.

The cadets at Gennes, supported by two tanks, were ordered to take back the bridgehead west of them. By 3pm, the Gennes commander was able to report that they had been successful and the left bank of the Loire was in the hands of the French, but casualties had been high. The German casualties around Gennes were between 200 and 300, killed, wounded and captured.

=== East ===
At Montsoreau, after the bridge was blown, it was quiet until dawn on 20 June when the Germans tried a 5:00 am crossing between Montsoreau and Saumur, and despite losses, managed to obtain a foothold on the south bank at Le Petit-Puy but were held back from advancing on Saumur by the cadets based around the railway viaduct. Three armoured cars patrolled the river road east of Saumur trying to keep the area clear of additional Wehrmacht reinforcements rowing across the river and driving them back to stop them assaulting Saumur. It was not possible to eliminate the Wehrmacht as they could shelter in the troglodyte houses in the cliff.

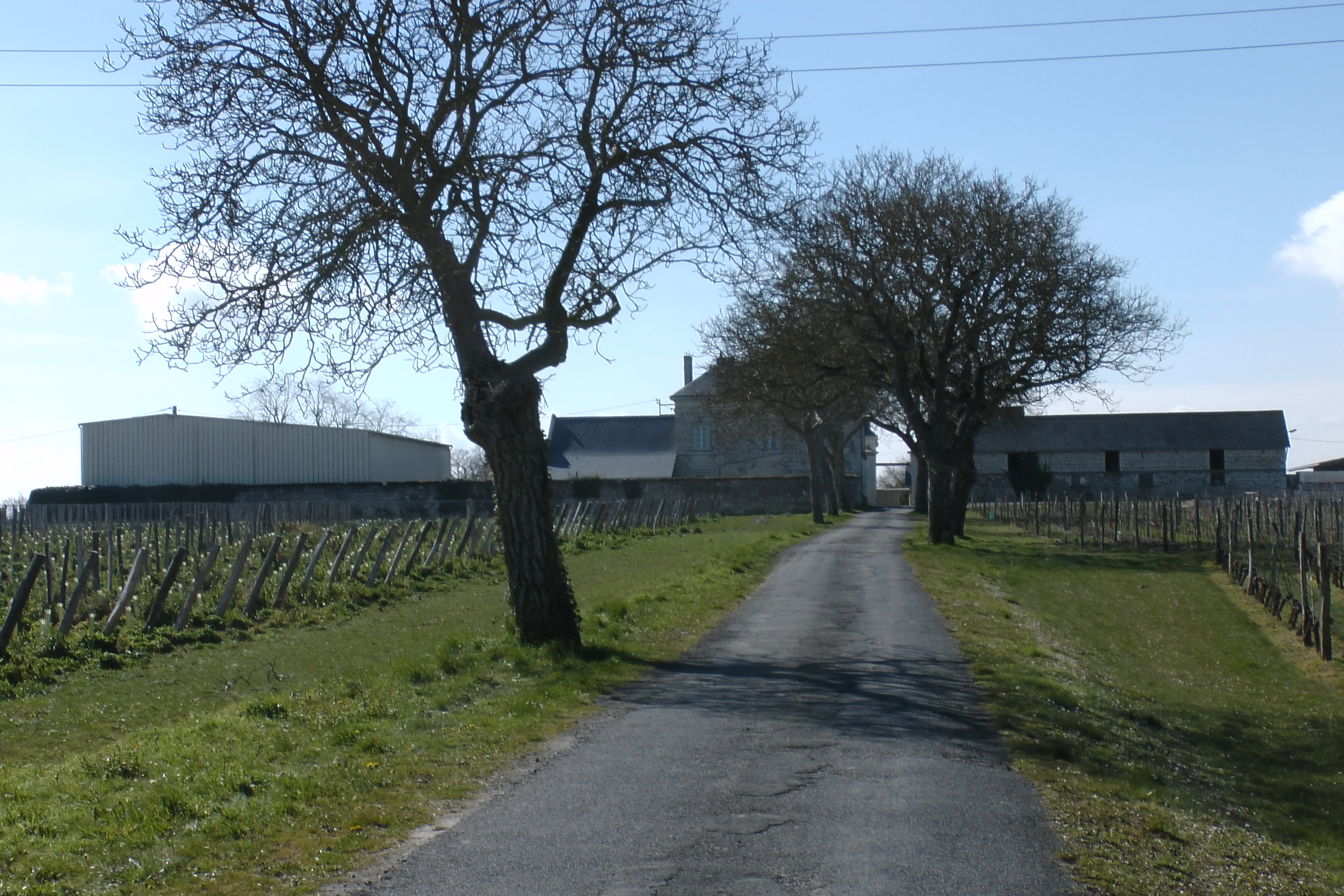
Aunis farm near Saumur

Aunis farm on the flat plateau 1,800m inland of the Loire River and cliffs was the headquarters of troop leader Captain de St-Blanquat and the troop brigades ordered to protect the gap between the railway bridge at Saumur and Montsoreau and when the Wehrmacht landed on the south side of the river, the unit realised it was in an excellent position to provide a defensible position to block a German breakout and trenches were quickly dug. The position was equally important to the Germans who opened up with artillery from north of the river using an aircraft as a spotter plane. Outlying student units began to attack Wehrmacht mortar positions in the bridgehead that were firing on the farm, causing it to catch fire, suffering casualties in the process. French military infantry officer students from St Maixent had arrived early on 20 June and, initially ordered towards Gennes, were diverted to the eastern sector and sent into a counterattack to relieve the pressure on Aunis, with the backing of the five Hotchkiss tanks of the reserve. The fighting had gone on for six hours with part of the farm on fire and under artillery, mortar, and machine gun fire, with multiple assaults having been made by the Germans, each one beaten back by the students when at 1:00 pm the counterattack from the south was mounted. The German artillery barrage switched to the advancing students and tanks, knocking out two of the tanks. The remaining three tanks pulled back, but the infantry students managed to reach the farm, reinforcing the cavalry cadets. The farm cellar was full of wounded, a second barn caught fire, and the French decided to pull back south before they were surrounded. The Wehrmacht took the farm in the late afternoon. The Germans and their French prisoners then tended to the wounded and collected the dead of both sides that were in the fields around the farm.

Among the French soldiers killed was the organist and composer Jehan Alain. He was assigned to reconnoitre the German advance on the eastern side of Saumur and encountered a group of Wehrmacht soldiers at Le Petit-Puy. Coming around a curve, and hearing the approaching tread of the Germans, he abandoned his motorcycle and engaged the enemy troops with his carbine, killing 16 of them before being killed himself. He was posthumously awarded the Croix de Guerre for his bravery.

Farther to the east, the Wehrmacht had also managed to cross the river towards Tours and were advancing south and circling behind Saumur. A bridge at Port-Boulet which had failed to collapse when demolition explosives went off was well-defended until it was captured at midnight of 20/21 June. The German commander gave an order to disengage from the Saumur fight, as it was easier to bypass the town rather than continue against the stiff resistance and incur more heavy losses.

=== Conclusion ===
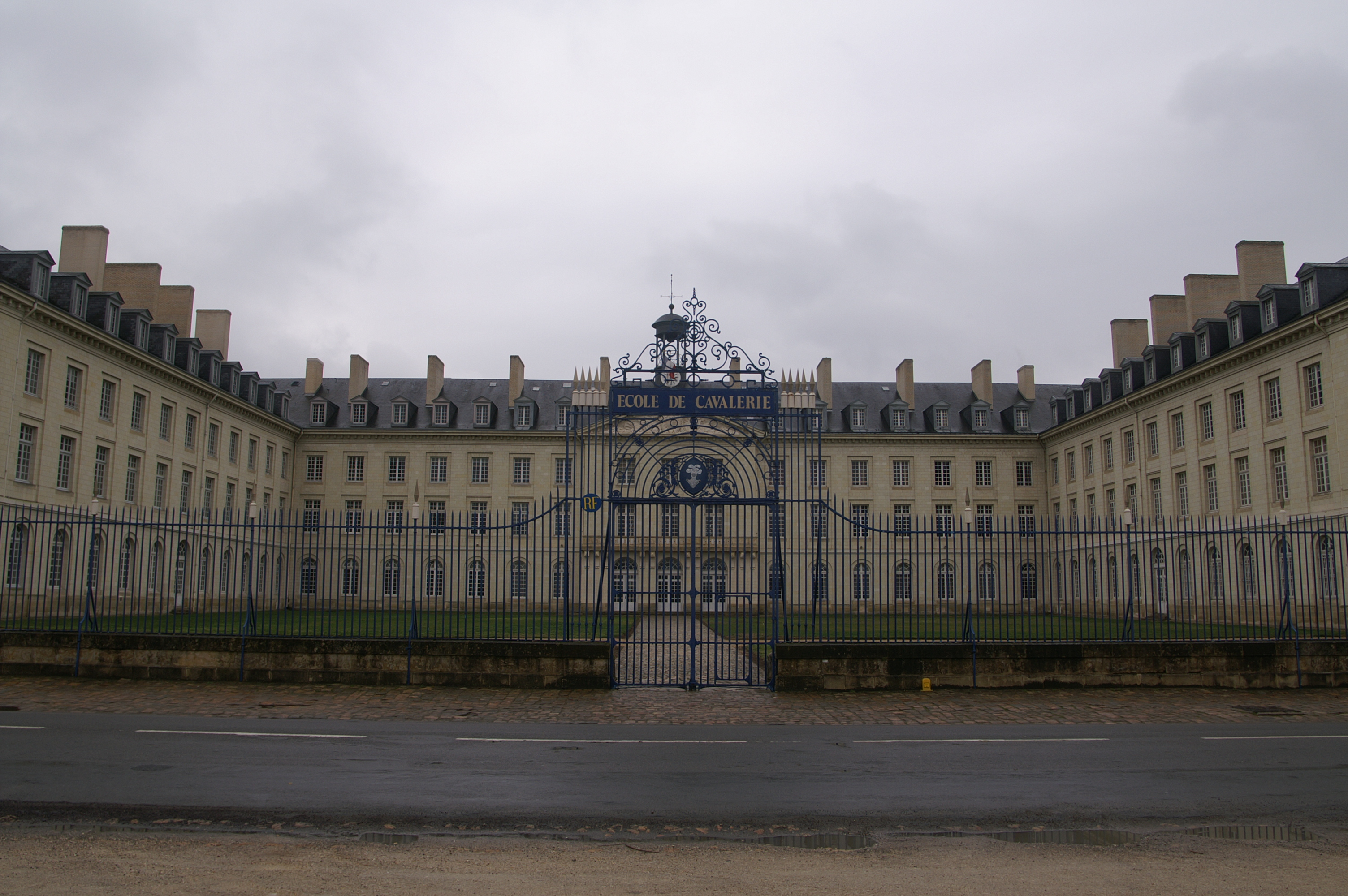
Saumur - École de Cavalerie - Caserne grille

A national armistice had been agreed on 19 June; however, it was on the afternoon of the 20th when Germany gave instructions about where and when the armistice would be signed: the French delegation would cross into German territory at Tours at 5 pm on 20 June. Meanwhile, at 9:00 pm on 20 June, with Tours to the east and Angers to the west in German hands and with orders to pull back, Colonel Michon decided the cadets could no longer hold Saumur and withdrew them south. The defenders were exhausted, but those that could made their way south, many by bicycle, to a rendezvous south of Fontevraud Abbey where the bodies of two English kings and a queen are buried: Henry II, Eleanor of Aquitaine and Richard the Lionheart.

The Battle of Saumur was fought on the 125th anniversary of the Battle of Waterloo and acquired a special name, La Haie Sainte (The Sacred Line) after the farm La Haye Sainte in the centre of the Belgian battlefield.

There was evidence that German officers, posing as Belgian civilian refugees, had shot two cadets on the 20th at Gennes; one of the Germans died later that day and was found with army dog tags under his shirt. A similar problem of spies was encountered at Montsoreau, where an empty house was discovered with a map marking where the defenders were dug in and two men in civilian clothing were found carrying signalling equipment on the south bank.

Why the battle took place is a bit of a mystery. The students provided the moral backbone to the defence; their decision to fight was probably because they would not accept the dishonour of simply retreating. The students were backed by other units and there were many instances of outstanding personal bravery, even though they knew it was only hours before the war would end and they were heavily outnumbered and outgunned. Many Wehrmacht officers commented on the bravery of the French students. To the French public, the cadets' resistance formed a seed for the rebuilding of French honour. Charles de Gaulle had made his appeal of 18 June and considered the action by the cadets to be the first act of resistance.

Max Hastings in All Hell Let Loose describes the battle in great detail and focuses on Colonel Michon, whom he calls "an old war horse" somewhat affectionately.

== Aftermath ==
The Wehrmacht entered Saumur on the morning of 21 June, the students retreated, with many burying their weapons before they were captured. The German commander, General Kurt Feldt, praised the resistance of the students in his after action report, in which he was the first to call them "Cadets of Saumur".

The armistice was signed on 22 June at Compiègne.

Of the 560 student officers from Saumur, 79 were killed and 47 wounded. In total 250 French were killed or wounded. Two tanks were destroyed. The Germans lost 132 killed, hundreds wounded and 7 armoured vehicles were destroyed.

The 218 students captured by the Germans were released in the following days instead of being interned, the cadets marched south, in the heat of summer, covering 43 km on 4 July, 35 km the next day as they passed St Maixent, then on the 8th they arrived in sight of the Demarcation Line, after cleaning their uniforms and polishing their boots they marched, singing, across the line to the Free Zone between lines of German soldiers standing at attention. They would be joined by other students as they acquired the opportunity to escape.

The school was Mentioned in Despatches at the Order of the Army by General Maxime Weygand. The school became Stalag 181, holding French prisoners of war from October 1940 until June 1942. During the war the town became a centre for resistance; unable to capture some of the trouble makers, the town was fined FF 500,000 by the Germans, but after the war, it was awarded the Croix de Guerre with palm, the citation referring to the town being a symbol of French patriotism. The bridges were repaired under orders from the Germans, until in 1944 when Allied bombers destroyed them again in an attempt to isolate the Normandy battlefields by destroying all routes over the Loire River. The town of Saumur would remain occupied until the liberation of the town on 30 August 1944 by the forces of an ex-student of the school, U.S. General George S. Patton, who had been studying there in 1912 under the then Colonel Maxime Weygand.

=== Memorials ===
- Saumur - Pont Napoleon renamed Pont des Cadets de Saumur
- Saumur - on island, east of northern bridge - to the civilians who died
- Saumur - at Hotel de Ville - plaque commemoration Croix de Guerre
- Gennes - on island - monument to those who died
- Gennes - St Eusèbe church - 17 graves and memorial to all those who died in the battles
- Aunis farm - Memorial to those who died near the farm
- There are additional single memorial stones alongside roads recording where specific students and instructors died
- Other soldiers who fell in the 1940 battle are buried in the National necropolis in Fleury-lès-Aubrais (Loiret) a suburb of Orléans

The fight for Honour at Saumur is shown on a relief plaque by sculptor Pierre Duroux on the National Fort Mont-Valérien Mémorial de la France combattante. The fighting in Saumur from 19–21 June 1940, part of the "Battle of France," with the narrative Le soldat tombe, mais son sacrifice ne sera pas vain. Du 19 au 21 juin 1940, les cadets de l'école de cavalerie, renforcés par des tirailleurs, des dragons, des élèves-aspirants de Saint-Maixent, livrent un combat désespéré contre la Wehrmacht pour l'honneur de l'armée française. (The soldier falls, yet his sacrifice will not be in vain. From 19 June 1940 to 21 June 1940, the cadets of the cavalry school, reinforced by tirailleurs, dragoons, and aspiring students of Saint-Maixent, held a desperate defence against the Wehrmacht for the honour of the French Army.)

== Gallery ==
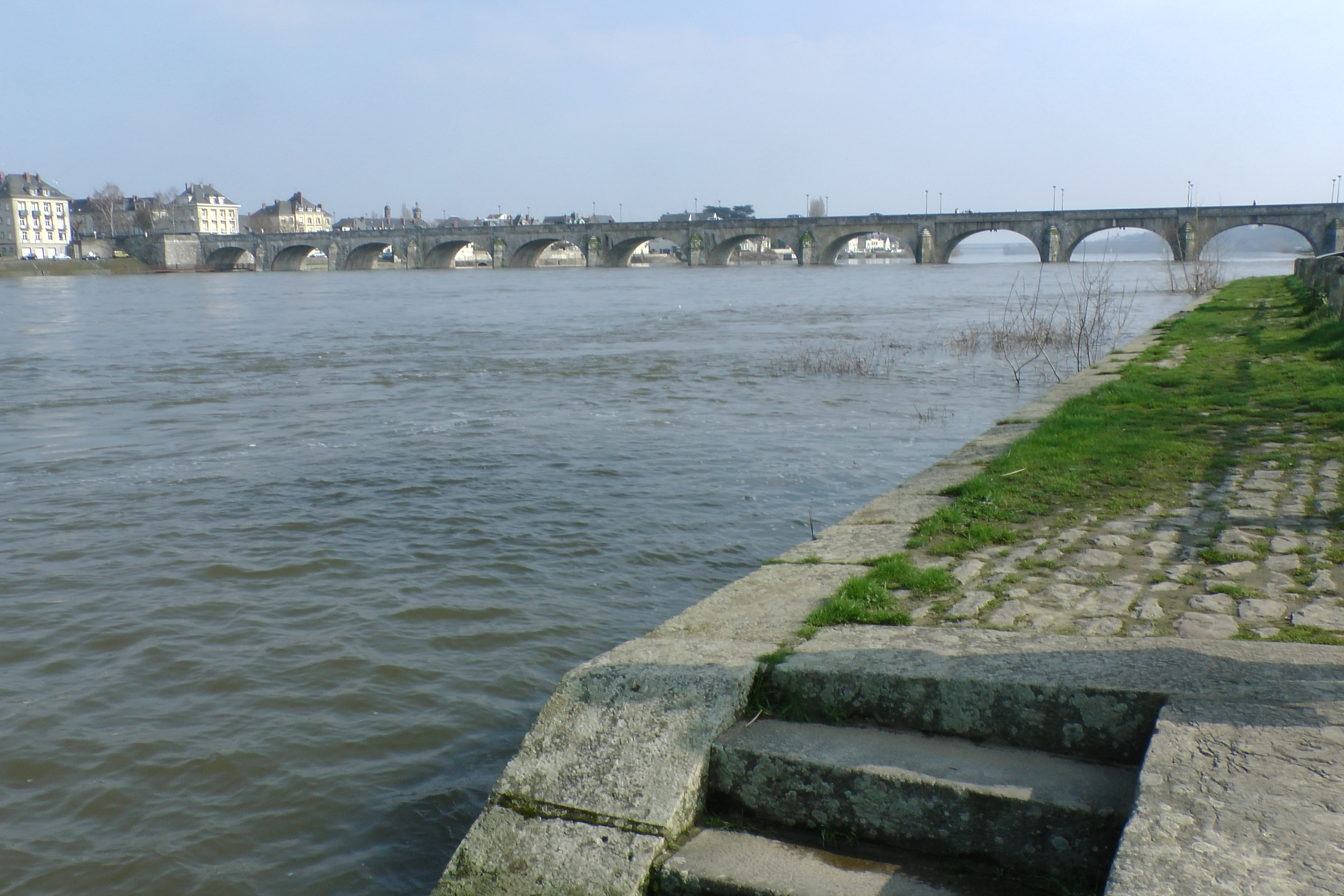
Bridge from Saumur to island

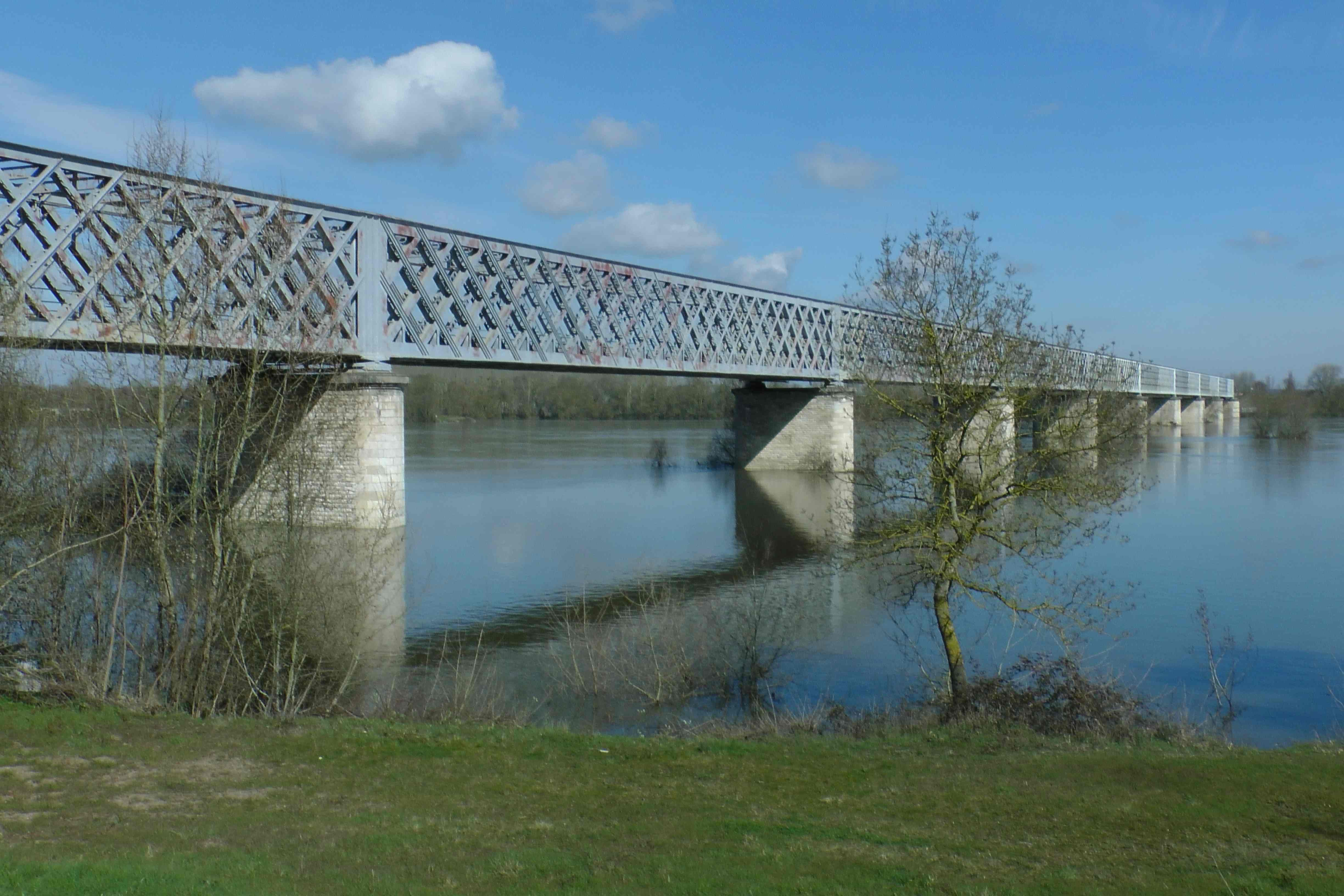
Saumur rail bridge

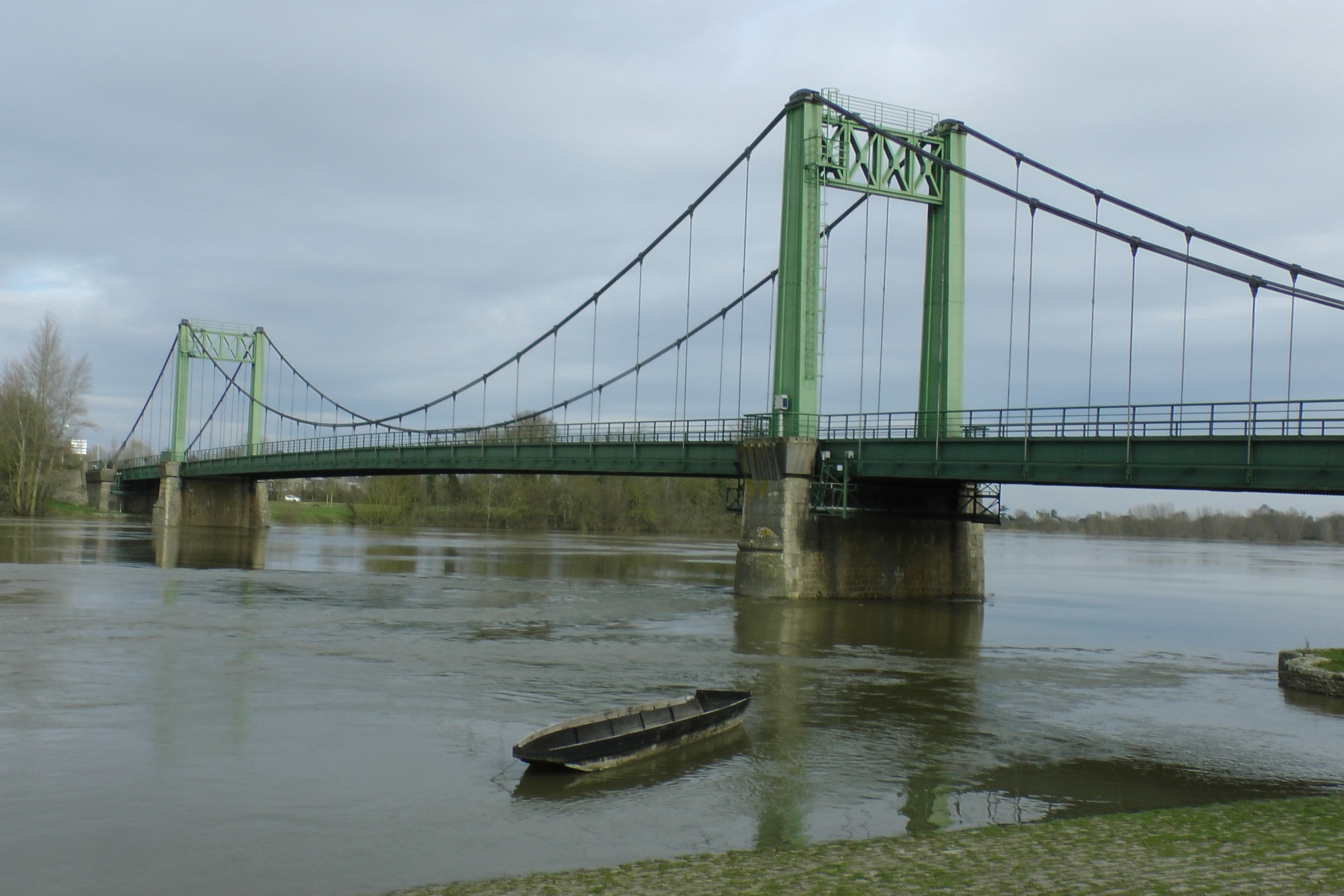
Gennes southern bridge

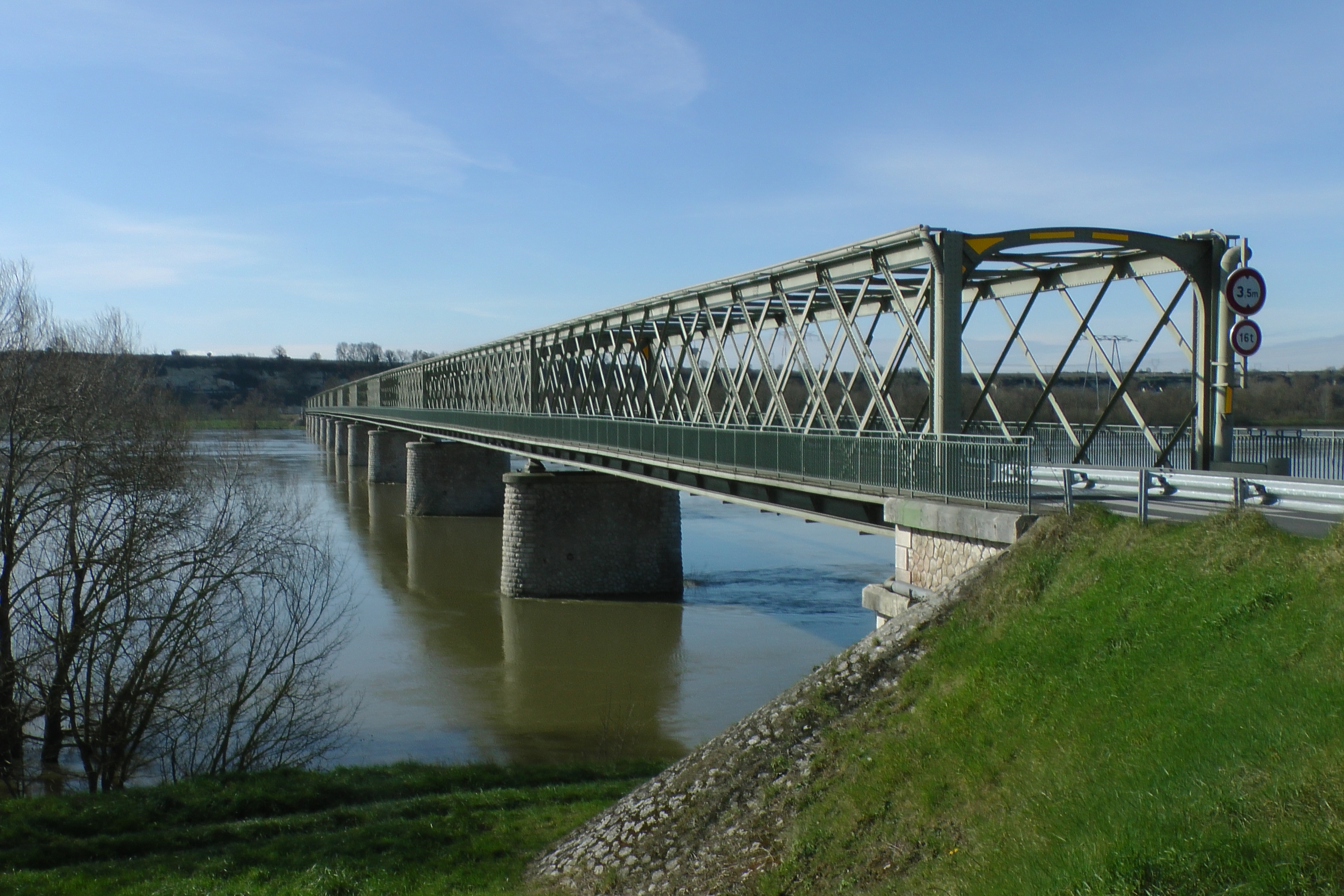
Bridge at Montsoreau

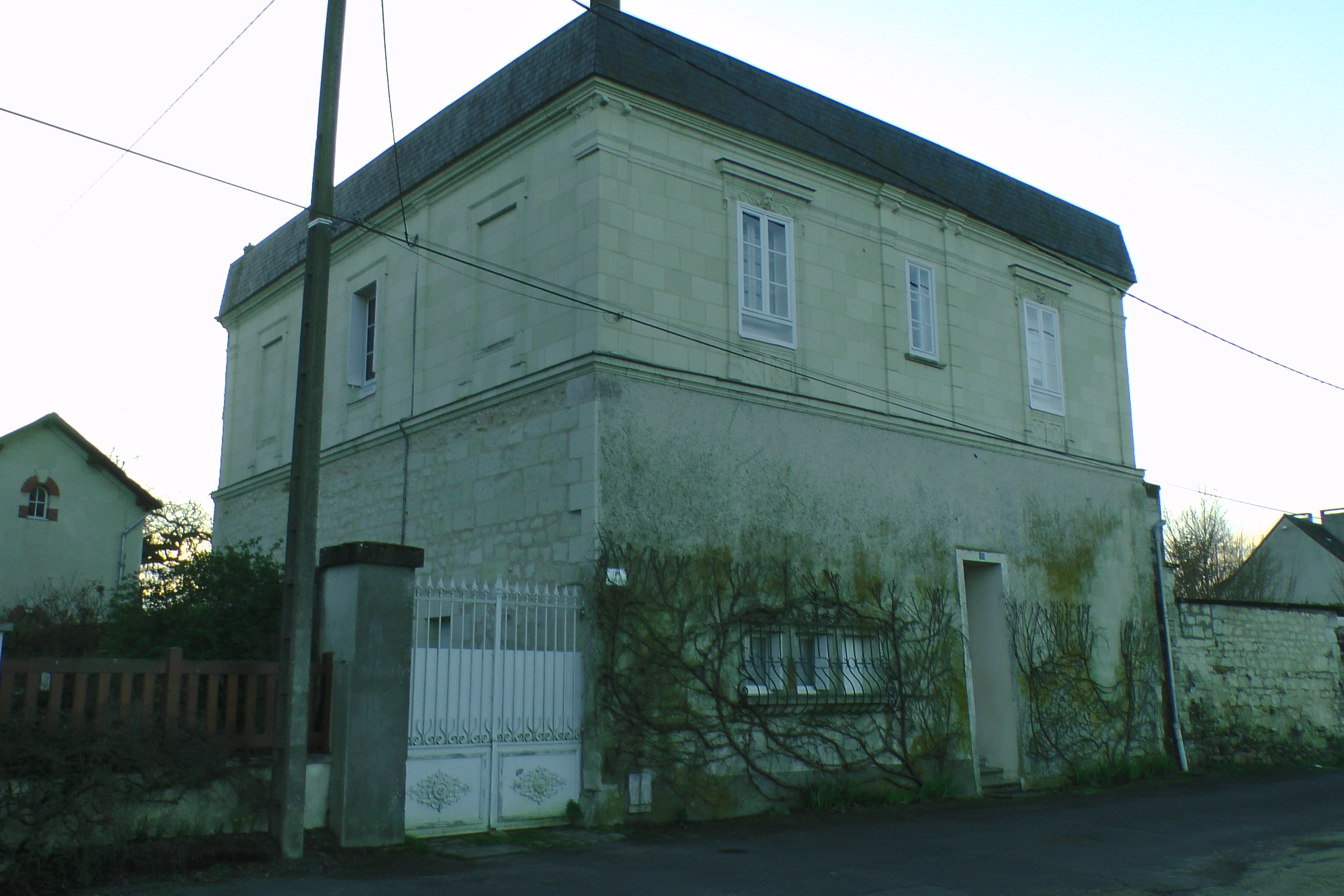
HQ Les Grandes Brises, Saumur

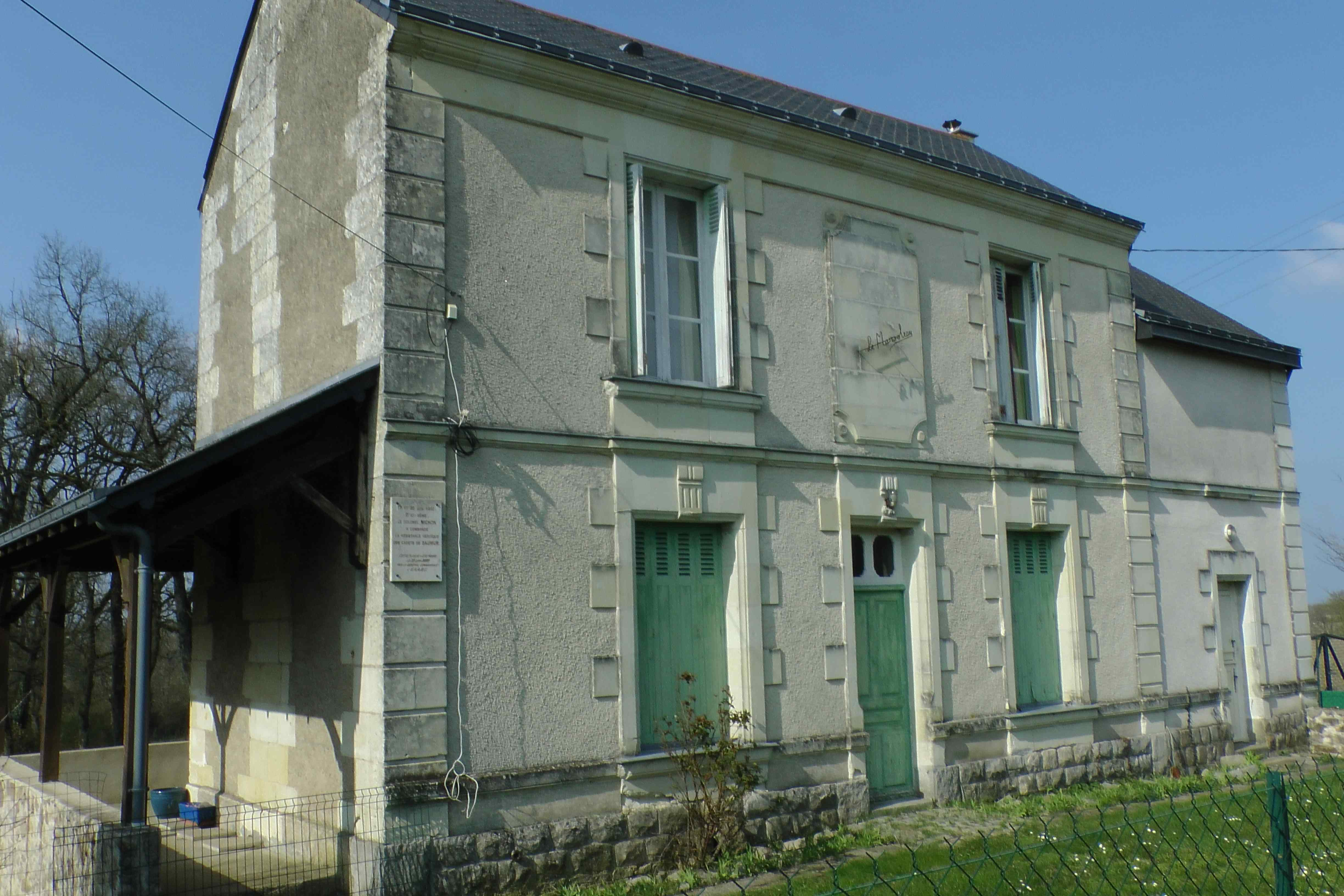
HQ Auberge de Marsoleau Saumur

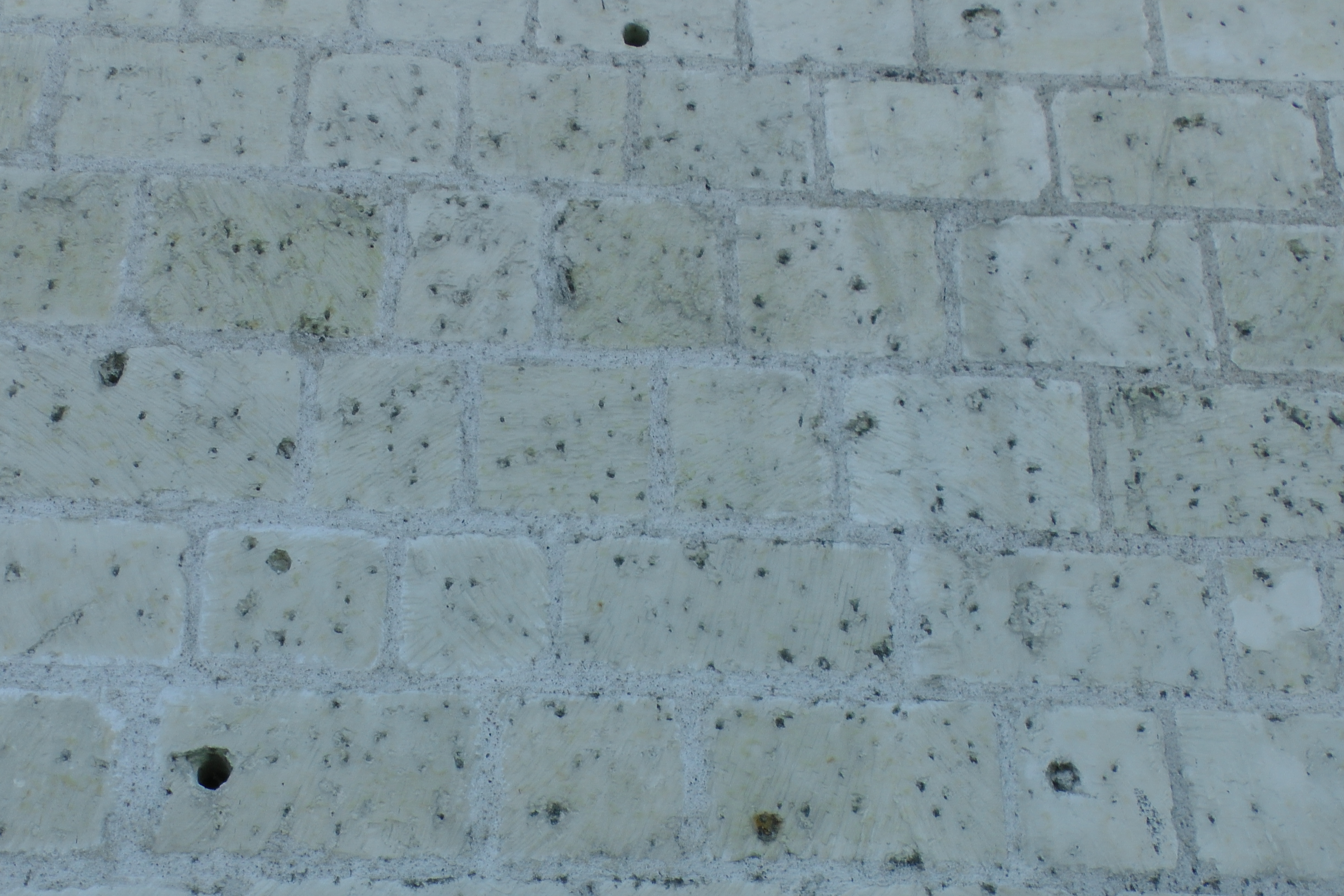
Saumur, Hotel de Ville, battle damage

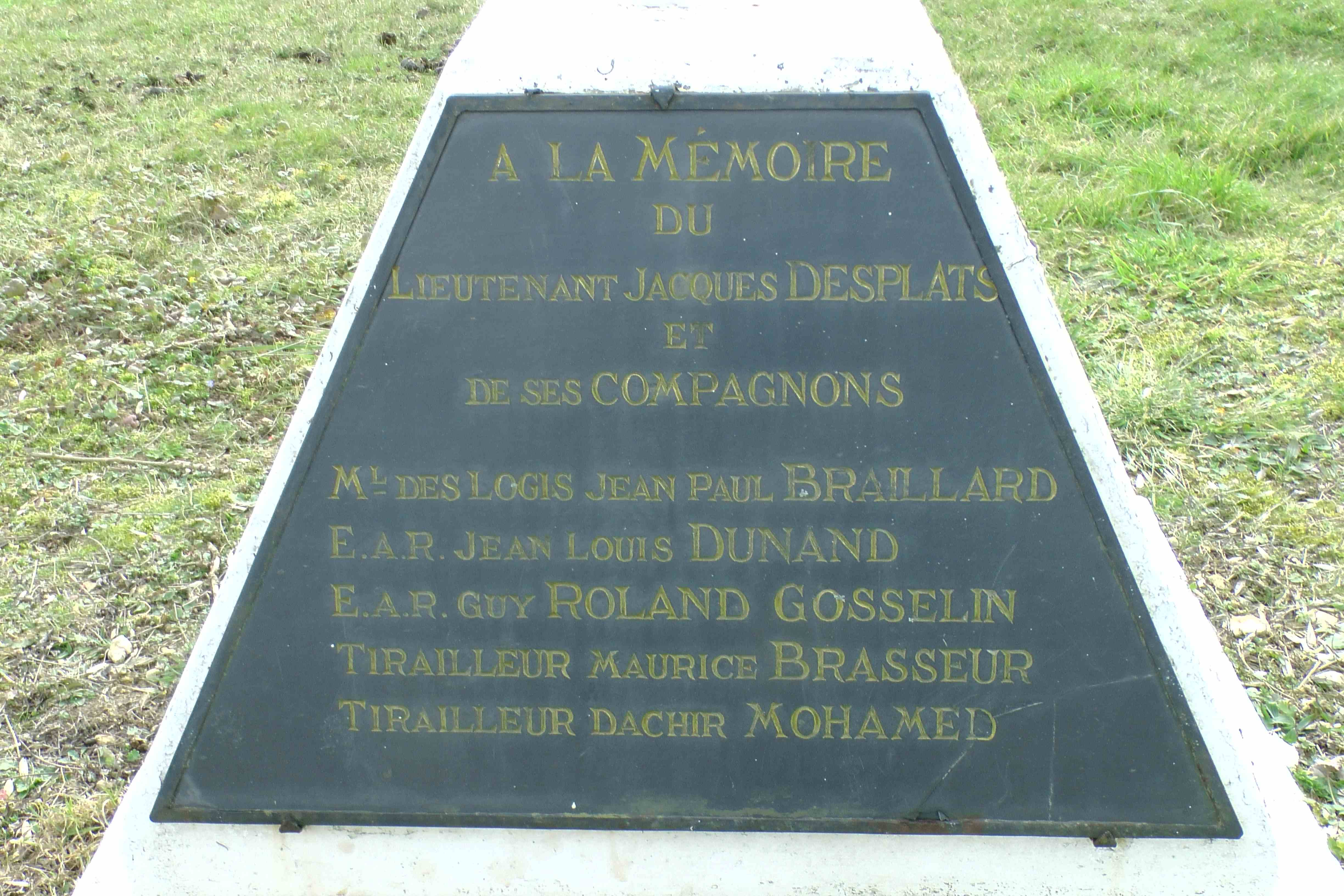
Gennes island 1940 memorial

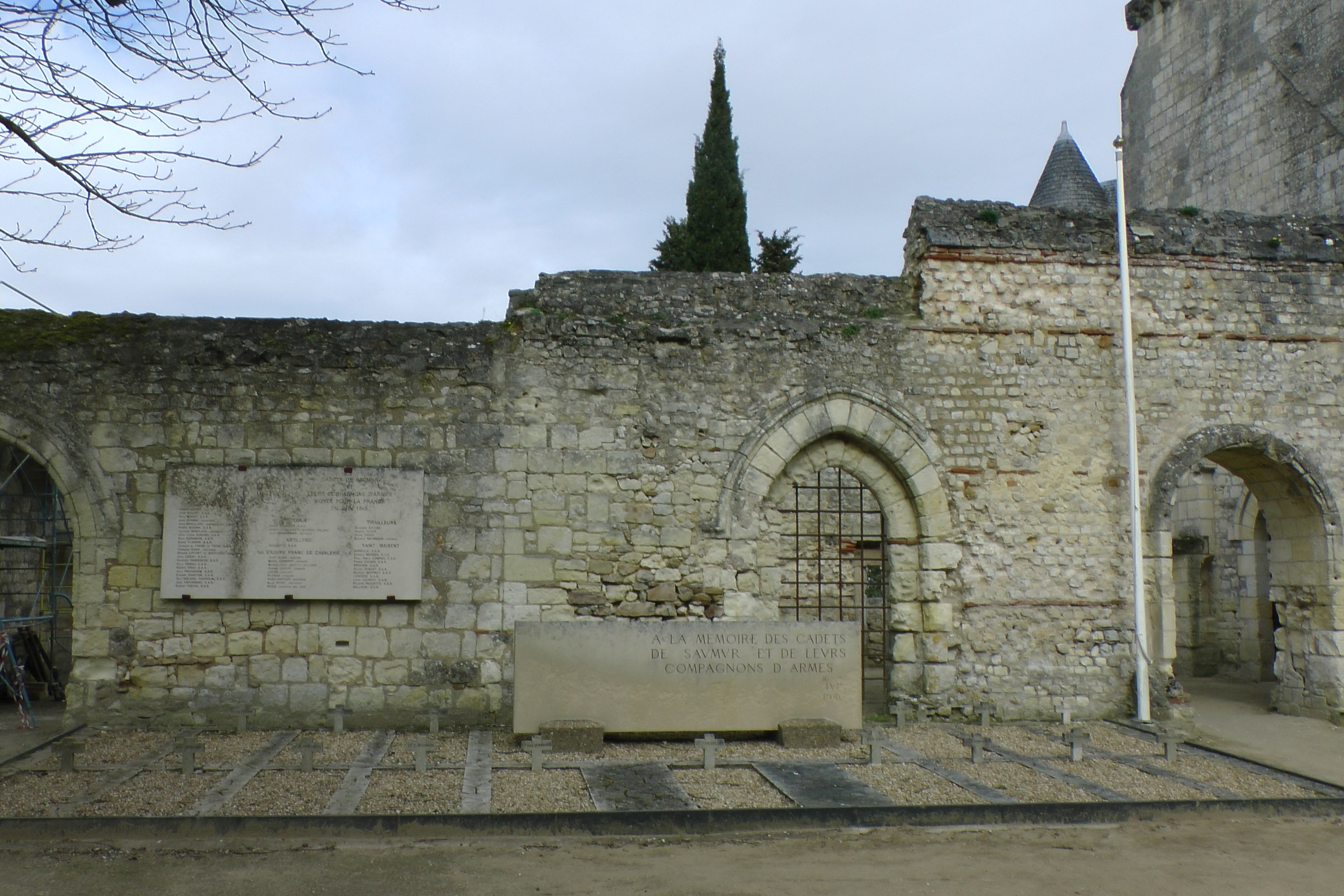
Gennes St Eusèbe cemetery

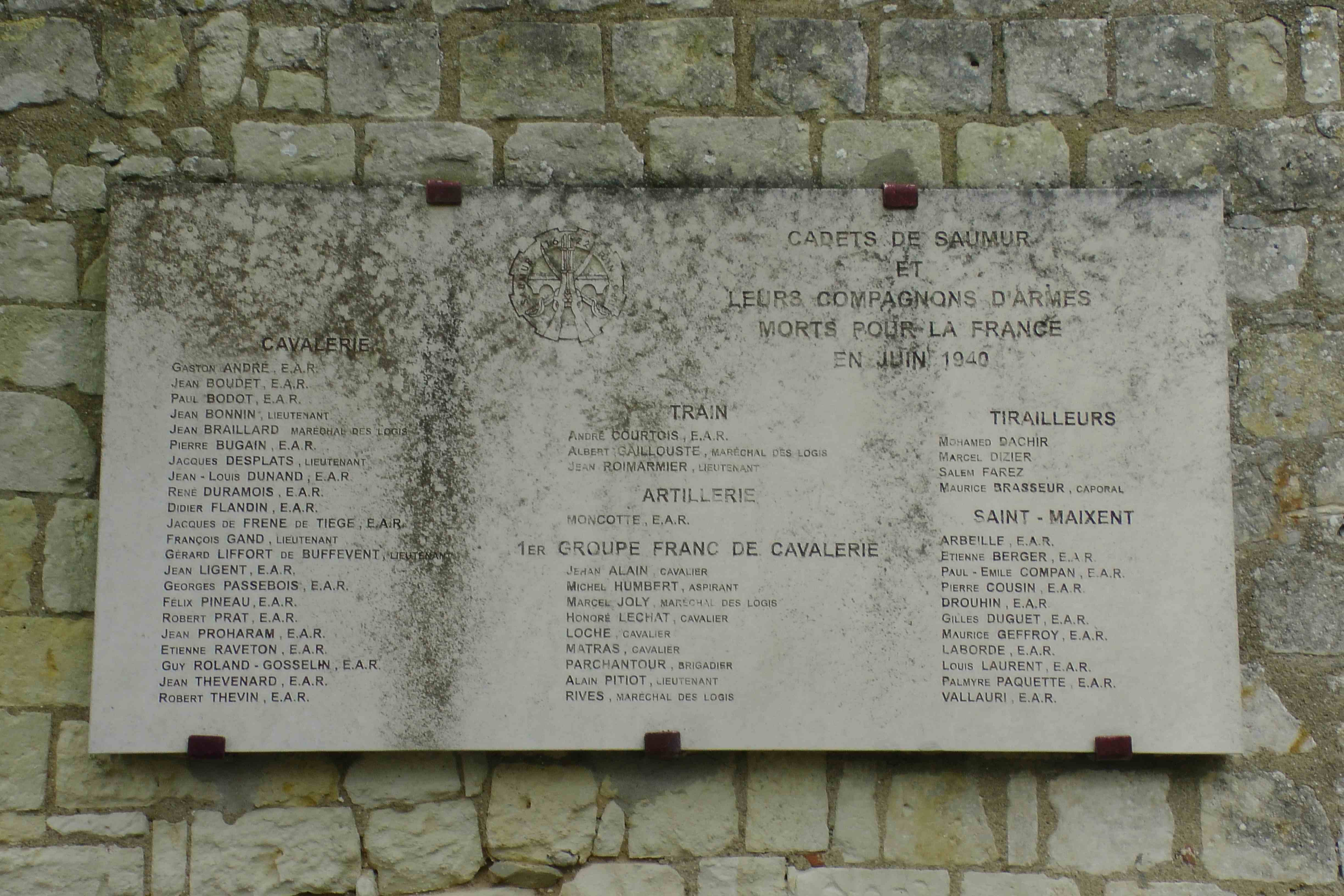
1940 St Eusèbe, Gennes, memorial

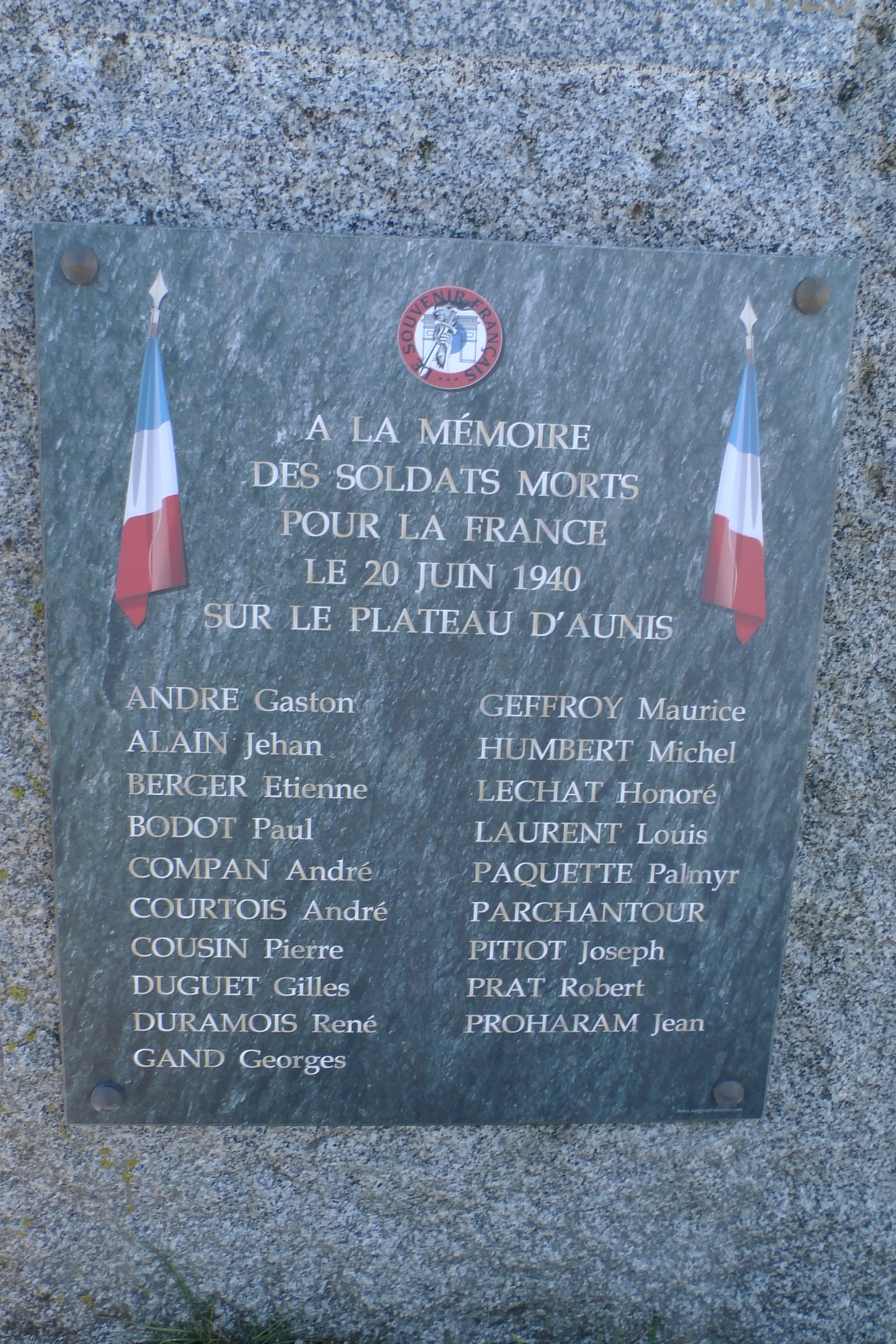
Aunis farm memorial

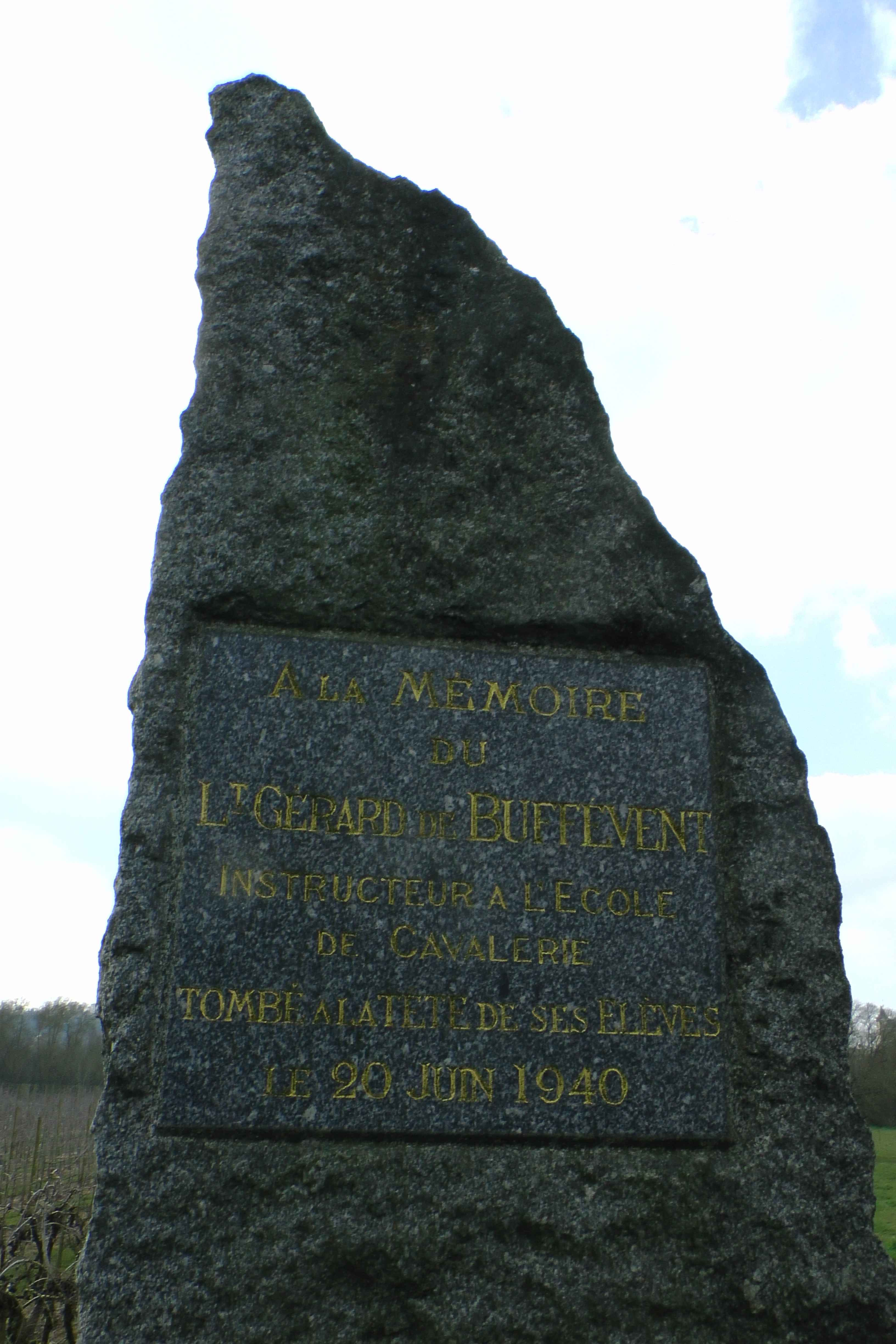
Memorial to Lt Gérard de Buffévent

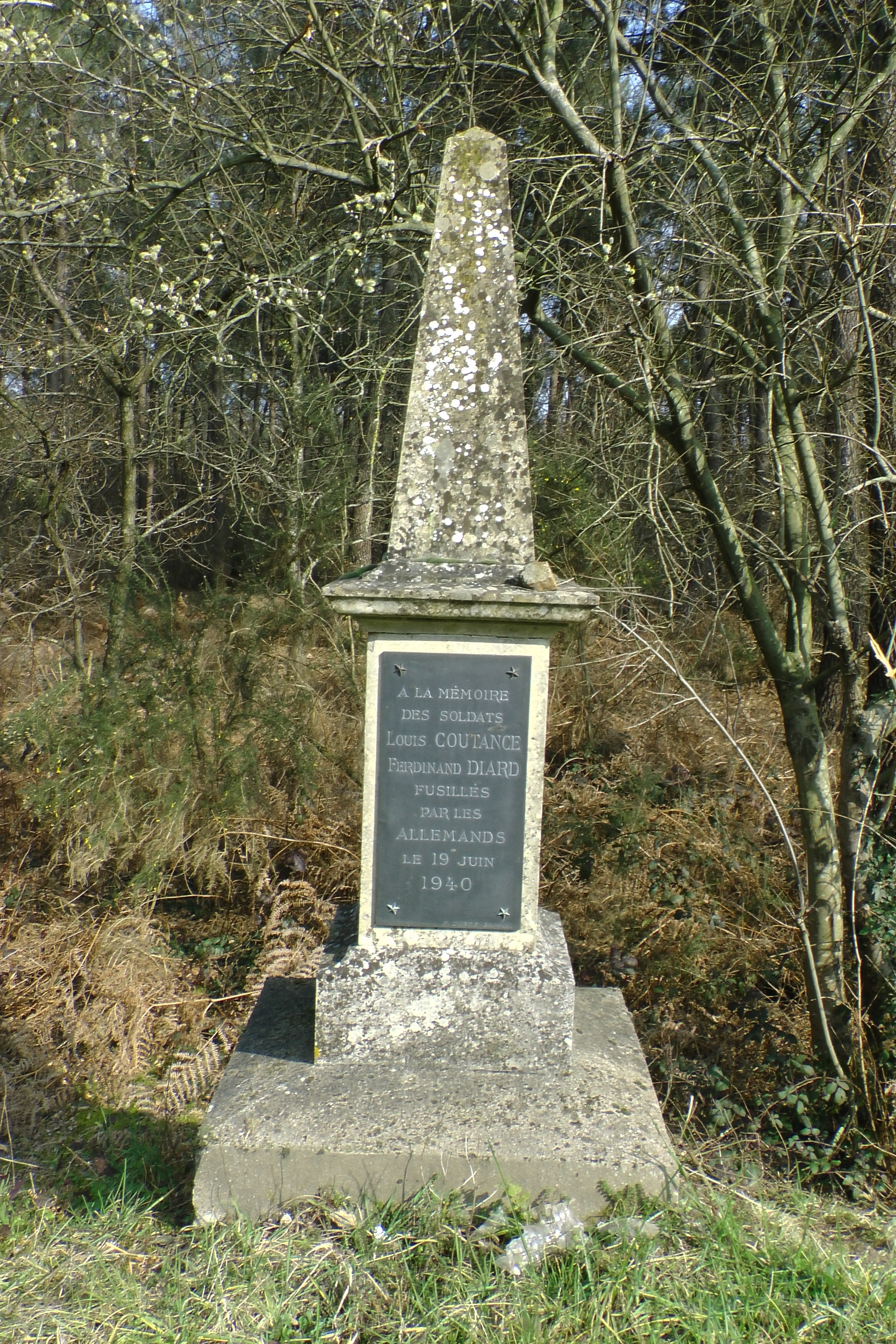
1940 memorial on road to Vernantes

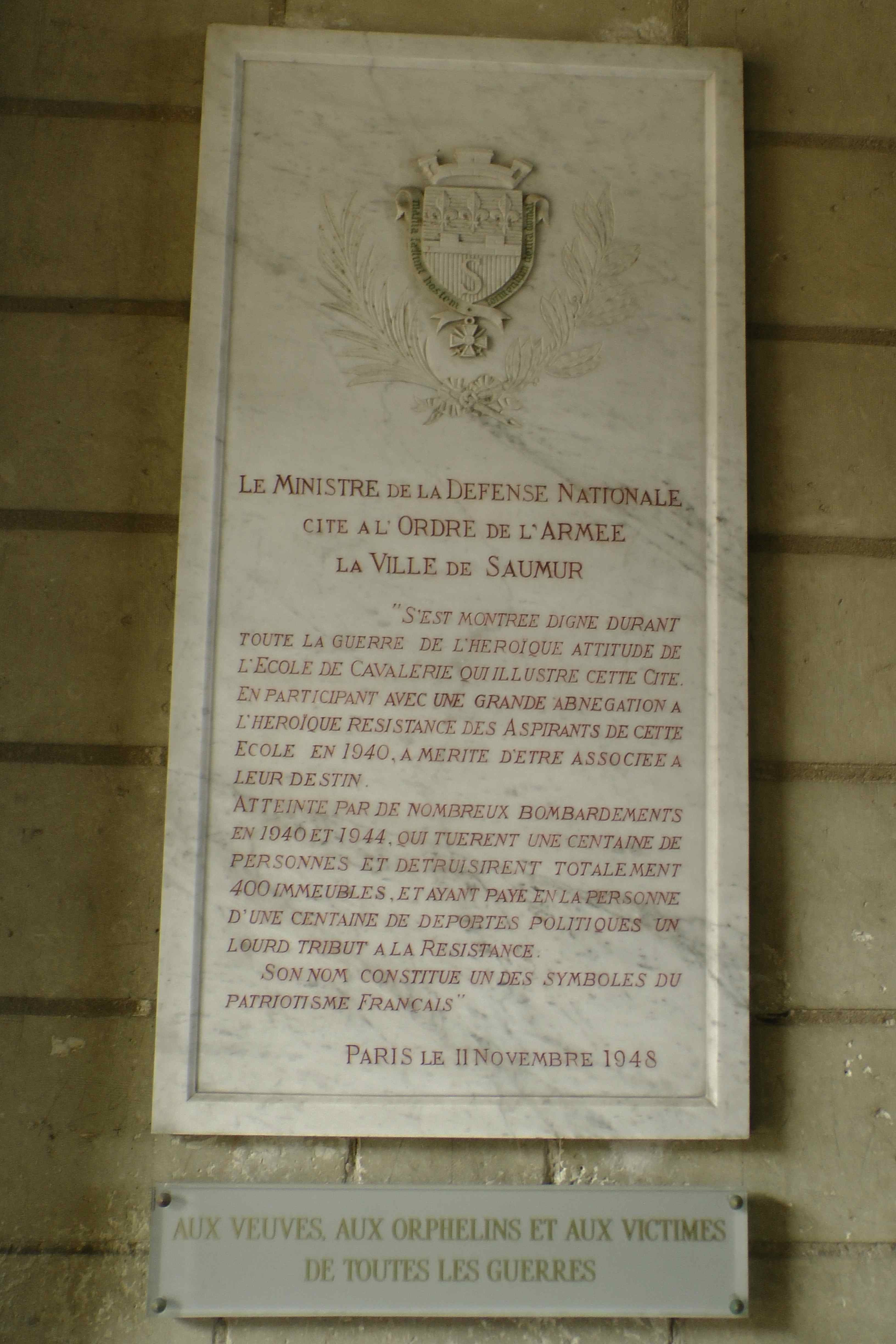
Saumur award

== See also ==
- List of French military equipment of World War II
- List of German military equipment of World War II
