= Henri Ecochard =

French military officer (1923–2020)

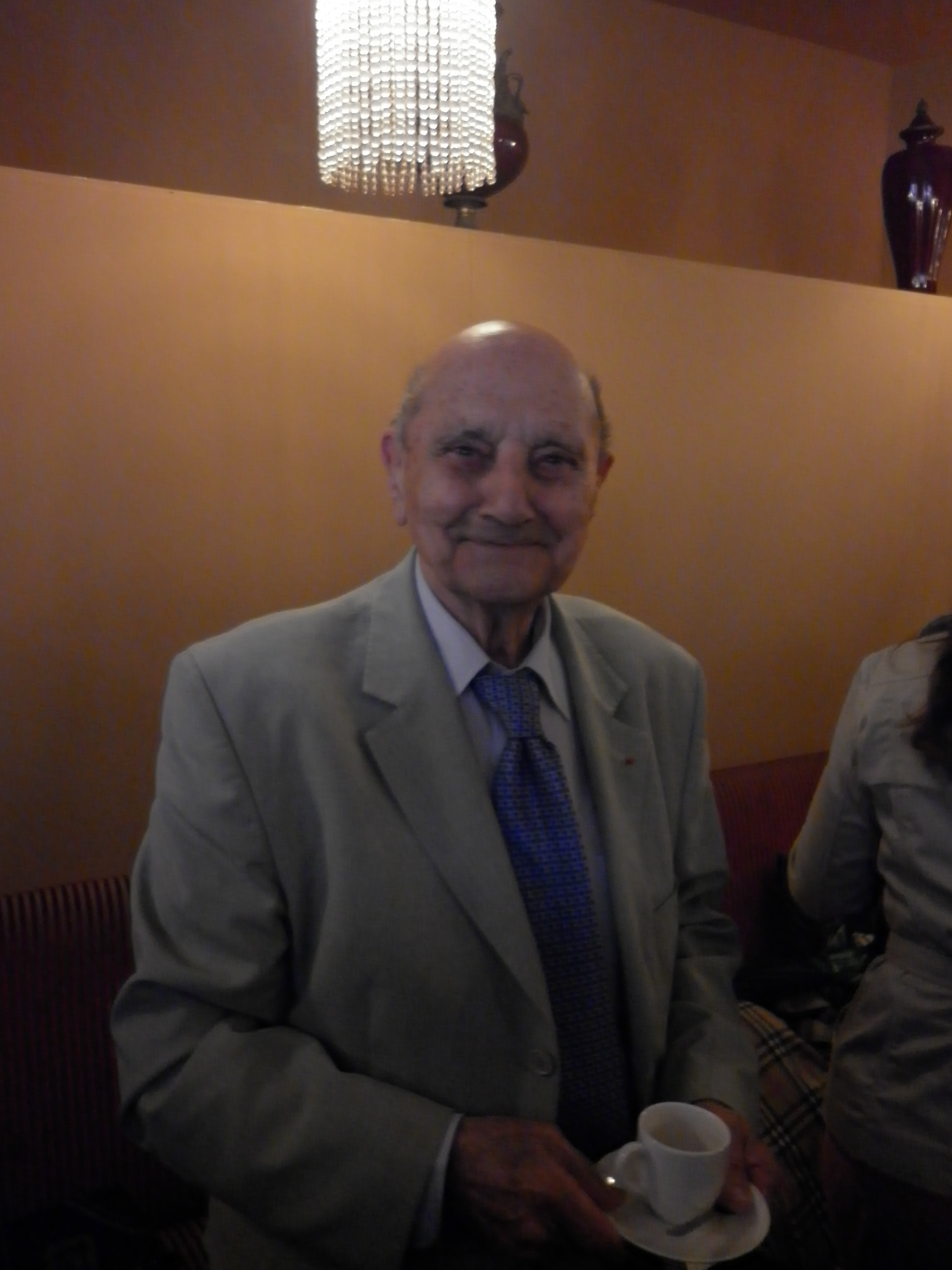
- Portrait of Henri Ecochard
- Born: 24 April 1923; Cholet, France
- Died: 3 April 2020 (aged 96); Levallois-Perret, France
- Occupation: Military Officer

Henri Ecochard (24 April 1923 – 3 April 2020) was a French military officer who served in the Free French Forces during World War II. He is known for compiling a list of fighters for Free France.

== Biography ==
Ecochard was born on 24 April 1923 in Cholet. His father was a doctor based in Airvault, who was heavily pacifist due to the memory of World War I. He was interested in international relations from a young age. Ecochard attended the Lycée Descartes in Tours. An anti-fascist, he was opposed to the anti-parliamentary ideals of François de La Rocque. He was also opposed to the Munich Agreement, which allowed Adolf Hitler to annex the Sudetenland from Czechoslovakia. When war was finally declared in France, Ecochard raised the Flag of France in front of his father's house.

Ecochard was revolted by the loss of the French Third Republic at the Battle of Saumur in 1940. He fled back to Airvault by bicycle and listened to the Armistice of 22 June 1940 on the radio. He did not hear the Appeal of 18 June by Charles de Gaulle, however he listened to Winston Churchill appeal to the French to continue fighting alongside the British. He biked to La Rochelle, where a boat took him to Cardiff.

Ecochard was imprisoned by British authorities out of suspicion for having no documents and not speaking English. He was taken to London, where he met Antoine Béthouart, Charles de Gaulle, and other refugees from the Battles of Narvik in Norway. He then joined the soldiers of Free France.

Although he was only 17, Ecochard lied about his age so that he could join the Free France infantries. He was one of the first fighters of Free France, which only had 2900 men in July 1940. He then trained, defending English troops from German paratroopers. Skilled in mechanics, he also became a motorcycle instructor.

After the United Kingdom was no longer in danger of being taken over, Ecochard joined the 1st Free French Division. He was sent to Brazzaville in April 1941 to join the Troupes coloniales. He was then sent to Syria, where he fought against troops remaining loyal to Vichy France. After a four-month trip from the French Congo, Ecochard was only available for the end of the Syria-Lebanon campaign. In Damascus, he became a sergeant, leading troops with spahi armored cars. After the Syria campaign, he went to Egypt and fought against the Afrika Korps commanded by General Erwin Rommel. In 1942, he participated in the Second Battle of El Alamein, the Battle of Bir Hakeim, and the Tunisian campaign, following orders from Philippe Leclerc de Hauteclocque. He carried out raids on supply trucks for Afrika Korps.

In 1944, Ecochard joined the 1st Artillery Regiment as an observation officer and learned to fly reconnaissance planes. He participated in the Artillery during the Italian campaign, Operation Dragoon, and the liberation of Toulon, Marseille, and Lyon. He was discharged on 30 June 1945, and returned to civilian life. After his military service, he was hired by Royal Dutch Shell.

After he retired from Shell, Ecochard compiled a list of those who participated in the Free French Forces. The list contained 53,079 names in its final edition, and was dubbed the "Ecochard list". He died on 3 April 2020 in Levallois-Perret at the age of 96 due to COVID-19.
