= 1st Cavalry Division (Wehrmacht) =

- 1. Kavallerie-Division
- Unit insignia
- Active: 20 November 1939 – 27 November 1941
- Country: Nazi Germany
- Branch: German Army
- Type: Cavalry
- Size: Division
- Garrison/HQ: Insterburg, Angerburg
- Colours: Golden Yellow
- Engagements: World War II; Invasion of Poland; Battle of France; Operation Barbarossa

Commanders
- Notable commanders: Kurt Feldt

Insignia
- Cavalry Unit Standard

The 1st Cavalry Division (German: 1. Kavallerie-Division) was formed in October 1939. It fought in the Netherlands, Belgium, France and on the Eastern Front. It was officially transformed into the 24th Panzer Division in late 1941.

== Formation ==
The division was formed on 25 October from the 1. Kavallerie-Brigade and expanded on 20 November with the addition of Reiter-Regiments 21 and 22. It was reconstituted in February 1940 when II\Reiter-Regiment 21 was disbanded and distributed to other regiments.

== Operational history ==
The campaign in Western Europe began in the Netherlands before it was assigned to the 4th Army and sent to France. The division crossed the Somme on 7 June and fought near Meulen. On 18–19 June, it fought around Saumur and attempted to capture a bridge across the Loire, but the attack failed when it was blown up with a patrol still on it. The division reached La Rochelle when the fighting in France ended.

After the French capitulation the division was stationed in France on occupation duties until the early summer of 1941 when it was moved east in preparation for the attack on the Soviet Union. It was assigned to the XXIV Army Corps in the opening stages of Operation Barbarossa, the invasion of the Soviet Union. The division fought in the southern sector of the front, seeing action around the Berezina and Dniepr rivers, especially in efforts to clear the Pripet Marshes of by-passed Red Army units.

It was withdrawn to France in November 1941 and its 17,000 horses were handed over to infantry divisions. The “Schlußappell”, the last divisional parade, was held on 5 November at Gomel before it was finally disbanded and reformed as the 24. Panzer-Division.

== Commanders ==
- General der Kavallerie Kurt Feldt (25 October 1939 – 28 November 1941)

== Area of operations ==
- The Netherlands and France (May 1940-Jun 1941)
- Eastern front, southern sector (Jun 1941-Nov 1941)

== Order of battle ==
- Headquarters
- Kavalleriebrigade 1 (1st Cavalry Brigade)
  - Kavallerieregiment 1 (1st Cavalry Regiment)
  - Kavallerieregiment 2 (2nd Cavalry Regiment)
- Kavalleriebrigade 2 (2nd Cavalry Brigade)
  - Kavallerieregiment 21 (21st Cavalry Regiment)
  - Kavallerieregiment 22 (22nd Cavalry Regiment)
- Reitendes Artillerieregiment 1 (1st Mounted Artillery Regiment)
  - I. Abteilung (1st Battalion)
  - II. Abteilung (2nd Battalion)
- Radfahrabteilung 1 (1st Bicycle Battalion)
- Panzerjägerkompanie 40 (40th Tank Destroyer Company)
- Pionierbataillon 40 (40th Engineer Battalion)
- Nachrichtenabteilung 86 (86th Signal Battalion)
- 40. Divisional Supply Group

== Literature ==
- Hubertus Schulz, ed. (1993), Die Aufklärer (Rf.1, K 4, PzAA 24) der 1. Kavallerie-Division/24. Panzer-Division (in German), Gross-Umstadt: Dohany, ISBN 3-924434-07-7
