= Gennes, Maine-et-Loire =

Gennes
- Part of Gennes-Val-de-Loire
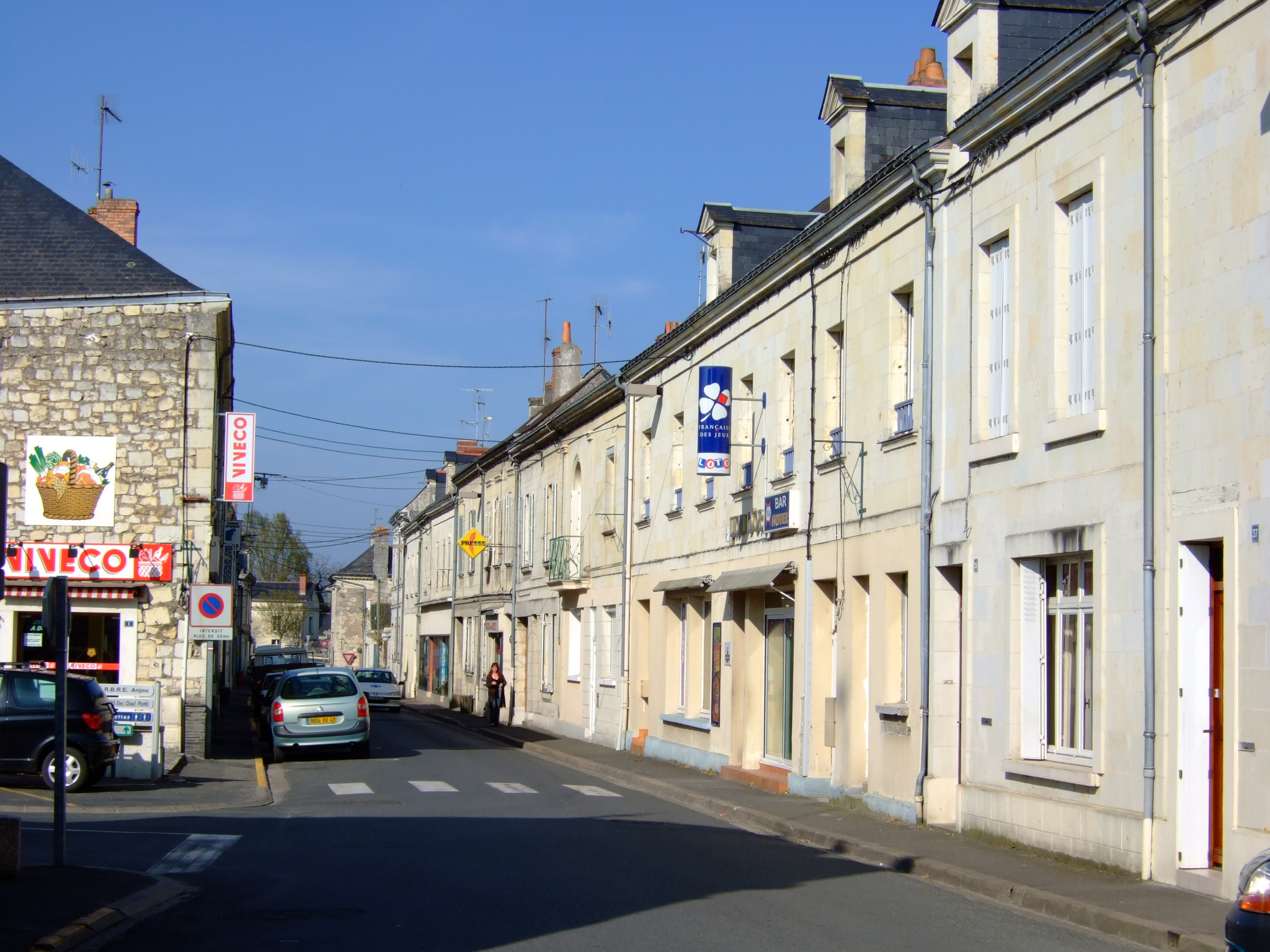

- Coat of arms
- Location of Gennes
- Location within France Location within Pays de la Loire
- Coordinates: 47°20′30″N 0°13′54″W
- Country: France
- Region: Pays de la Loire
- Department: Maine-et-Loire
- Arrondissement: Saumur
- Canton: Doué-la-Fontaine
- Commune: Gennes-Val-de-Loire
- Area^{1}: 32.52 km^{2} (12.56 sq mi)
- Elevation: 29 m (95 ft)
- Highest elevation: 98 m (322 ft)
- Lowest elevation: 22 m (72 ft)
- Population (2022): 2,353
  - Density: 72.36/km^{2} (187.4/sq mi)
- Demonym(s): Gennois, Gennoise
- Time zone: UTC+01:00 (CET)
  - Summer (DST): UTC+02:00 (CEST)
- Postal code: 49350
- ^{1} French Land Register data, which excludes lakes, ponds, glaciers > 1 km^{2} (0.386 sq mi or 247 acres) and river estuaries.

Gennes is a former commune in the Maine-et-Loire department in western France. On 1 January 2016, it was merged into the new commune of Gennes-Val-de-Loire.

== History ==
Gennes was the scene of a World War II battle in June 1940, during the Battle of Saumur during the last stages of the Battle of France. The French casualties, seventeen Cadets of the Cadre Noir Saumur Cavalry school, killed between 17 and 20 June 1940, are buried in the enclosure of the 11th century Saint-Eusèbe church built over an ancient Gallo-Roman sanctuary, on a hilltop overlooking the scene of their sacrifice.

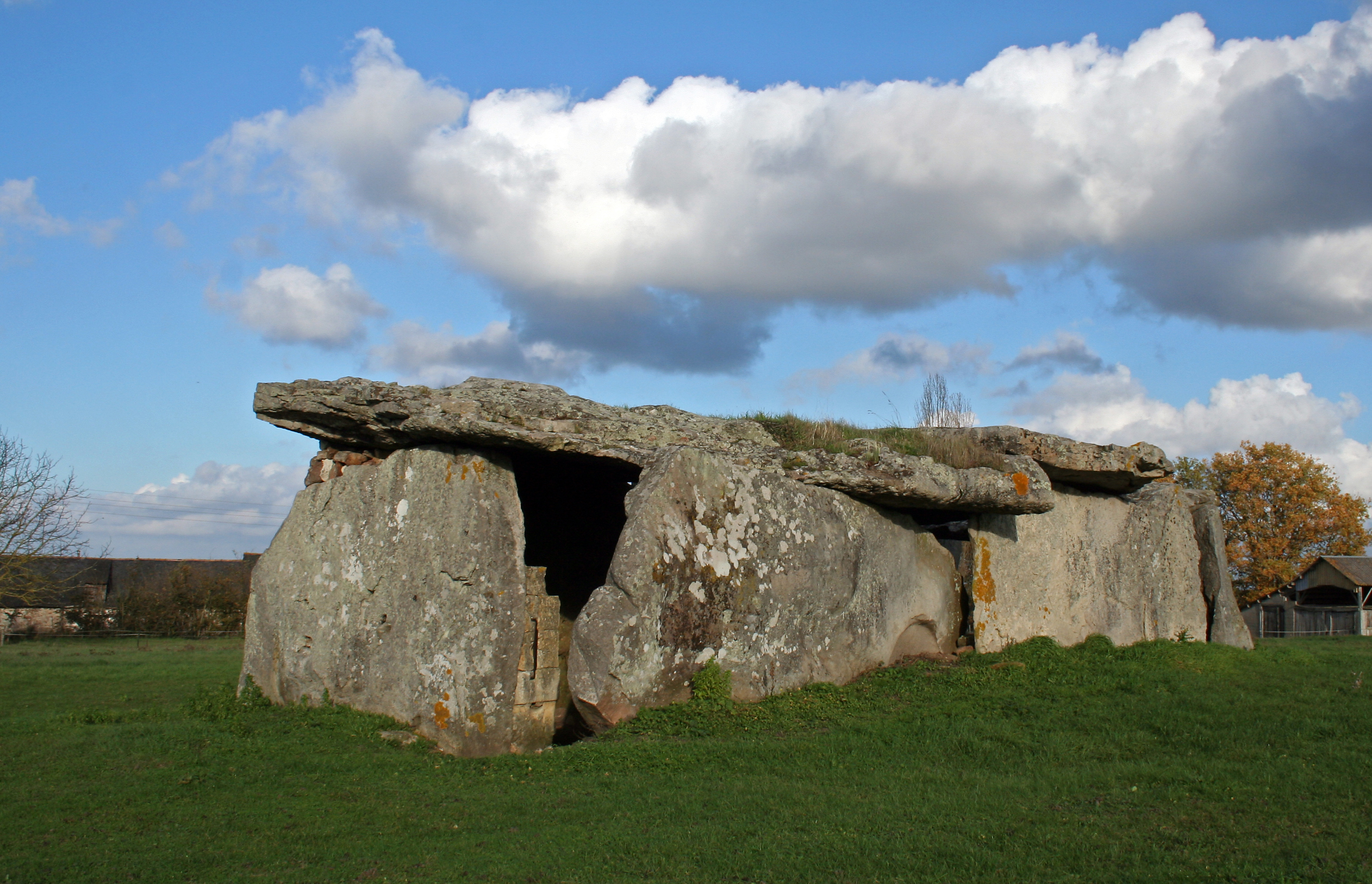
Dolmen of La Madeleine, one of the dolmens visible around Gennes

The castle of Milly-le-Meugon, in its vicinity, was the property of the Maillé-Brézé family, closely related to the French royal family through the First Prince of the Blood, Louis de Bourbon, Prince of Condé.

== See also ==
- Communes of the Maine-et-Loire department
