= Kurt Feldt =

Nazi General

- Born: November 22, 1887; Schmentau, Kreis Preußisch Stargard, German Empire
- Died: 11 March 1970 (aged 72); West Berlin, West Germany
- Burial place: Stahnsdorf South-Western Cemetery
- Military career
- Allegiance: German Empire; Weimar Republic; Nazi Germany
- Branch: Army
- Service years: 1908–1945
- Rank: General of the Cavalry
- Commands: 1st Cavalry Division; 24th Panzer Division
- Conflicts: World War II
- Awards: Knight's Cross of the Iron Cross

Kurt Feldt (22 November 1887 – 11 March 1970) was a general in the Wehrmacht of Nazi Germany during World War II. He was a recipient of the Knight's Cross of the Iron Cross. He was the German commander in the Battle of the Afsluitdijk on 12–14 May 1940.

== Awards ==
- Knight's Cross of the Iron Cross on 23 August 1941 as Generalmajor and commander of 1. Kavallerie-Division

Military offices
Preceded by None	Commander of 1. Kavallerie-Division; 25 October 1939 – 28 November 1941	Succeeded by Renamed 24. Panzer-Division
Preceded by Previously 1. Kavallerie-Division	Commander of 24. Panzer-Division; 28 November 1941 – 15 April 1942	Succeeded by Generalleutnant Bruno Ritter von Hauenschild
