= Hürtgenwald =

- Municipality
- Coat of arms

- Location of Hürtgenwald within Düren district
- Interactive map of Hürtgenwald
- Location within Germany Location within North Rhine-Westphalia
- Coordinates: 50°42′36″N 06°22′28″E
- Country: Germany
- State: North Rhine-Westphalia
- Admin. region: Köln
- District: Düren
- Subdivisions: 13

Government
  - Mayor (2025–30): Stephan Cranen (Ind.)

Area
  - Total: 88.05 km^{2} (34.00 sq mi)
- Elevation: 300 m (980 ft)

Population (2025-12-31)
  - Total: 9,119
  - Density: 103.6/km^{2} (268.2/sq mi)
- Time zone: UTC+01:00 (CET)
  - Summer (DST): UTC+02:00 (CEST)
- Postal codes: 52393
- Dialling codes: 02429
- Vehicle registration: DN
- Website: www.huertgenwald.de

Hürtgenwald (German pronunciation: [ˈhʏʁtɡn̩ˌvalt]; Ripuarian: Hüêtschewald) is a municipality in the district of Düren in the federal state of North Rhine-Westphalia, Germany. It is located in the Eifel hills, approx. 15 km south-west of Düren. Much of the area is covered by forest (Hürtgenwald in literal translation means Hürtgen Forest).

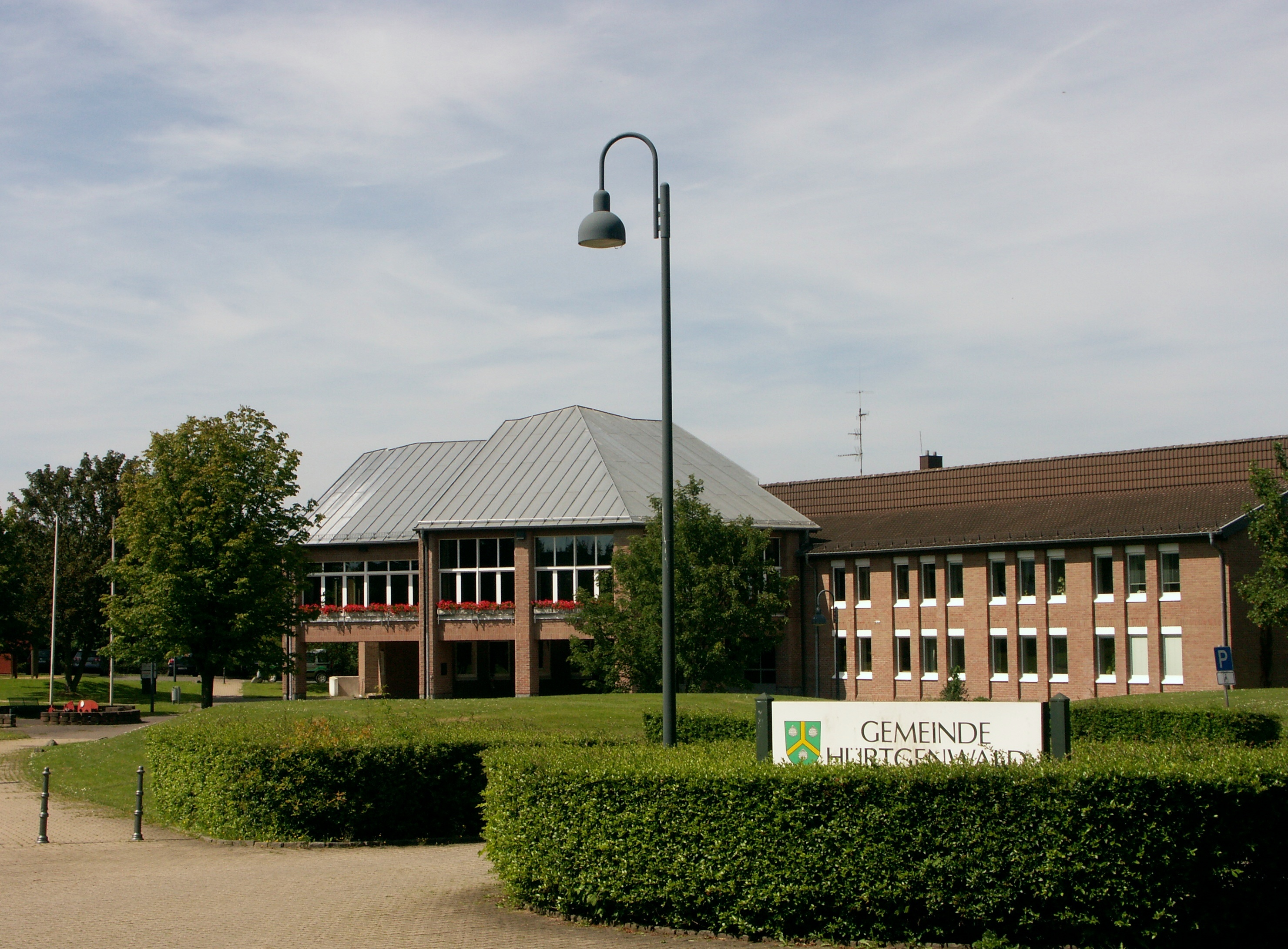
The town hall of Hürtgenwald, located in the village of Kleinhau

Hürtgenwald is composed of the villages Bergstein, Brandenberg, Gey, Großhau, Horm, Hürtgen, Kleinhau, Raffelsbrand, Schafberg, Simonskall, Strass, Vossenack and Zerkall (in alphabetical order). Kleinhau with the town hall is not only the administrational center of the community, but has become the commercial center as well (shops and a few supermarkets).

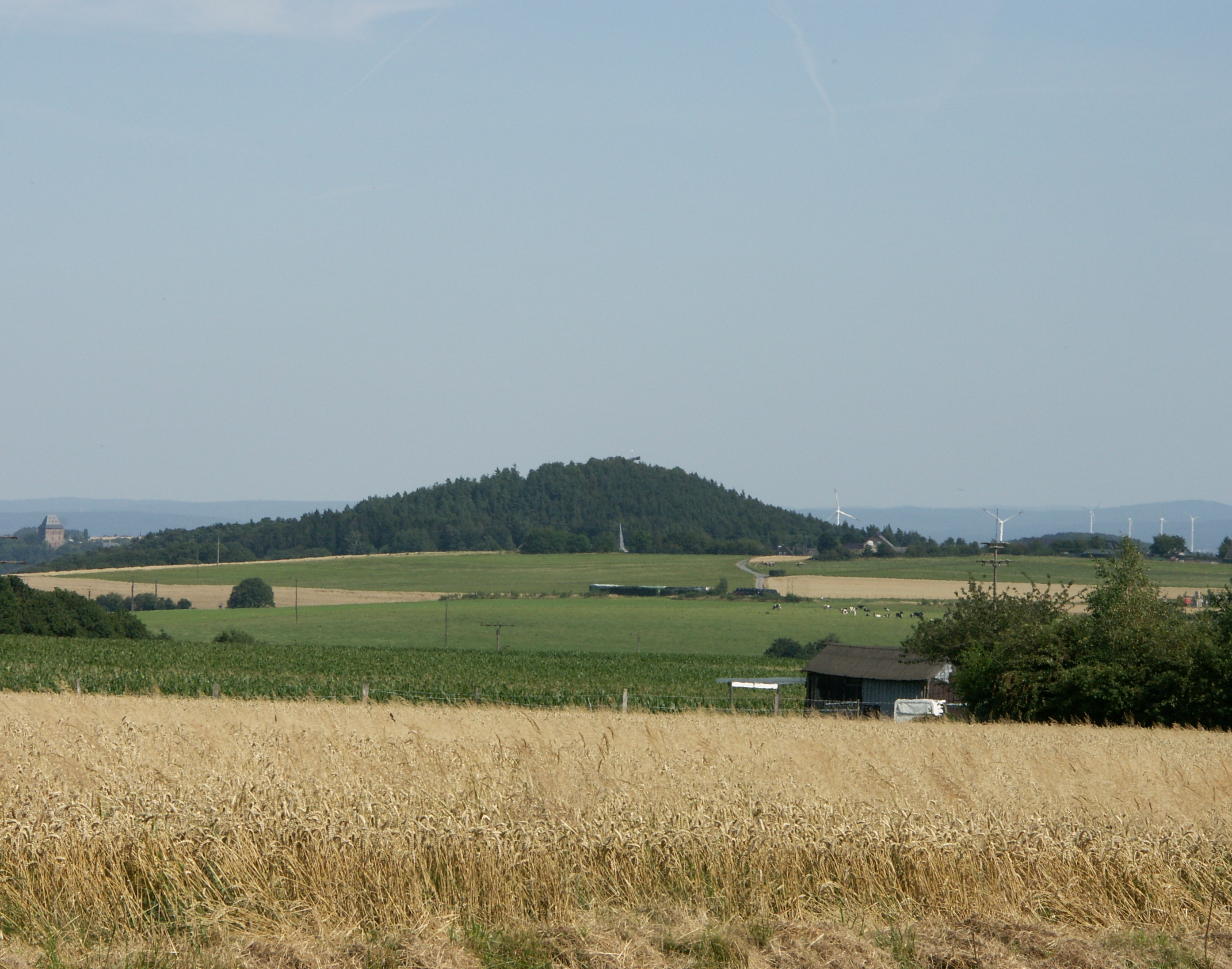
A landmark: the Burgberg ("Castle Hill") near Bergstein

In World War II, Hürtgenwald was the theater of the Battle of Hürtgen Forest, a major battle. Two large war graves (one in Hürtgen, one in Vossenack) are places to commemorate those who fell.

The landscape of forested hills, lakes and rivers attracts a lot of people from nearby densely populated areas, e.g. from the Cologne area and the Ruhr Area, for recreational reasons.

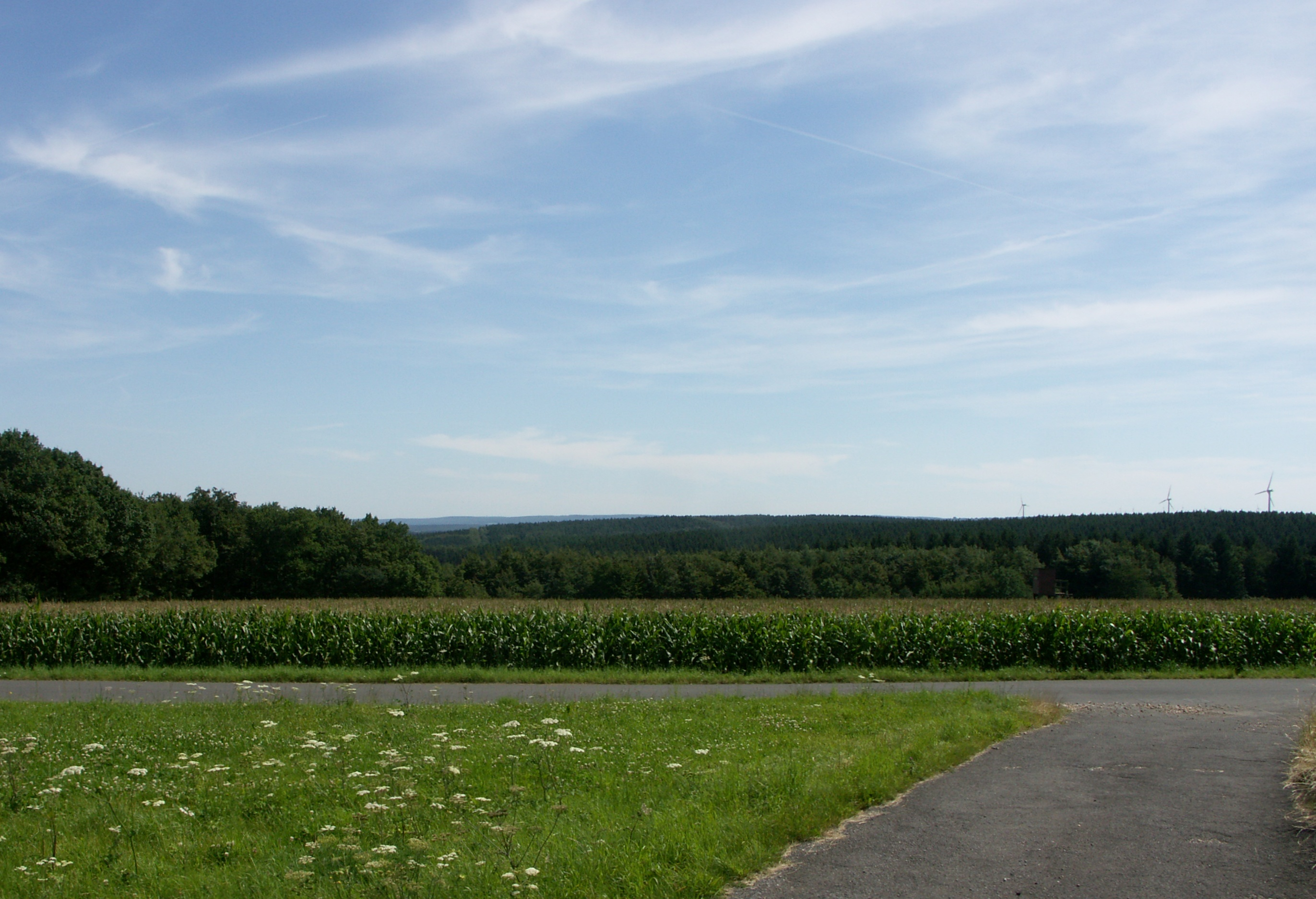
View over the landscape, looking from northeast of Kleinhau towards Brandenberg

== Population ==
Historical population

| Year | Pop. | ±% p.a. |
|---|---|---|
| 1965 | 5,843 | — |
| 1970 | 6,573 | +2.38% |
| 1975 | 6,827 | +0.76% |
| 1980 | 7,111 | +0.82% |
| 1985 | 7,428 | +0.88% |
| 1990 | 7,927 | +1.31% |
| 1995 | 8,474 | +1.34% |

| Year | Pop. | ±% p.a. |
|---|---|---|
| 2000 | 8,835 | +0.84% |
| 2005 | 8,806 | −0.07% |
| 2010 | 8,668 | −0.32% |
| 2015 | 8,780 | +0.26% |
| 2020 | 8,675 | −0.24% |
| 2025 | 9,119 | +1.00% |

Source: Landesdatabank Nordrhein-Westfalen

== See also ==
- Battle of Hürtgen Forest
- 1944 Hürtgen Forest Museum
