= Courtney Hodges =

United States Army general (1887–1966)

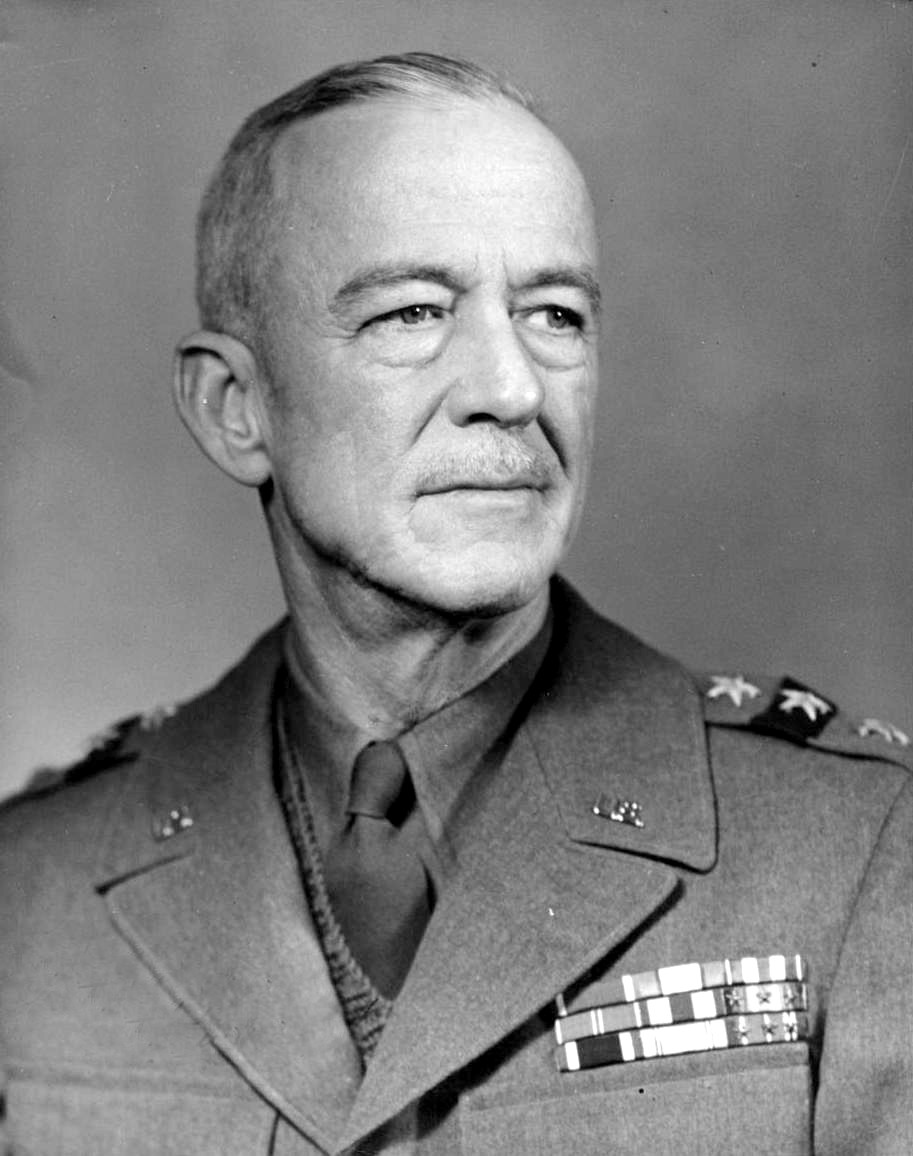
- Hodges as a lieutenant general, 1944
- Born: 5 January 1887; Perry, Georgia, United States
- Died: 16 January 1966 (aged 79); San Antonio, Texas, United States
- Burial place: Arlington National Cemetery
- Spouse: Mildred Lee Buchner (m. 1928)
- Military career
- Allegiance: United States
- Branch: United States Army
- Service years: 1906–1949
- Rank: General
- Service number: 0-2686
- Unit: Infantry Branch
- Commands: First United States Army; Third United States Army; X Corps; Army Ground Forces; United States Army Infantry School; 2nd Battalion, 6th Infantry Regiment
- Conflicts: Philippine–American War; Post-war insurgency; Border War; Pancho Villa Expedition; World War I; Hundred Days Offensive; Battle of Saint-Mihiel; Meuse-Argonne campaign; World War II; Operation Overlord; Normandy landings; Operation Cobra; Falaise pocket; Siegfried Line campaign; Battle of Hürtgen Forest; Battle of Aachen; Operation Queen; Battle of the Bulge; Western Allied invasion of Germany; Operation Lumberjack; Battle of Remagen; Battle of the Ruhr Pocket
- Awards: Distinguished Service Cross; Army Distinguished Service Medal (3); Silver Star; Bronze Star Medal; Complete list

Courtney Hicks Hodges (5 January 1887 – 16 January 1966) was a senior officer in the United States Army who commanded the First U.S. Army in the Western European Campaign of World War II. Hodges was a "mustang" officer, rising from private to general.

Born in Perry, Georgia, he initially enrolled at the United States Military Academy to become a commissioned officer but was dismissed after failing geometry. He joined the U.S. Army in 1906 as an enlisted serviceman, becoming a non-commissioned officer and later obtained a commission after passing an examination in 1909. Hodges served under John J. Pershing in the Pancho Villa Expedition and took part in the first rescue mission in U.S. military aviation history when he helped save a stranded aviator. He was a battalion commander in France during World War I and was awarded the Distinguished Service Cross for his actions.

In 1943, he was posted to England to serve under General Omar Bradley. Hodges was initially the deputy commander of the American First Army during the D-Day invasion and was appointed commander two months later. While in command of the First Army, which included 18 divisions, he commanded one of the largest forces under a single general in the European theater of World War II. The First Army liberated Paris and was the first Allied army to enter Nazi Germany. As Courtney's First Army front pushed towards Germany, he launched an offensive through the Hürtgen Forest, which resulted in severe casualties but limited gains. After the collapse of German forces at the Ruhr, the First Army advanced deep into Germany and eventually linked up with Soviet forces at the Elbe river.

== Early life and military career ==
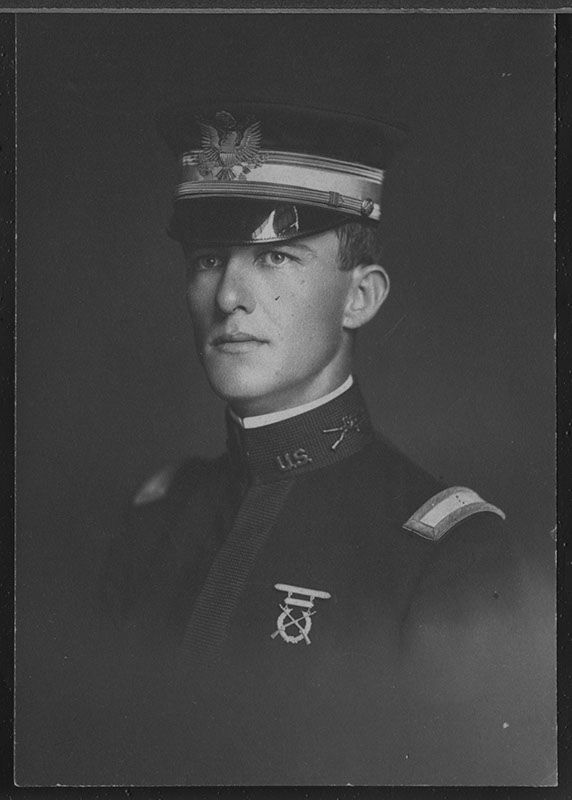
Hodges as a cadet at West Point

Hodges was born in Perry, Georgia, on 5 January 1887. He was the fourth of eight children. The Hodges family traces its roots back to England, and Hodges's branch arrived in America in 1750. After the American Revolution, they moved to Houston County, Georgia. Courtney's father, John, became the proprietor of the local newspaper, Houston Home Journal. Hodges attended Perry High School and graduated in 1903. Later, he enrolled at North Georgia Agricultural College (now known as the University of North Georgia). He became a member of the Pi Kappa Alpha Fraternity.

After his first year at North Georgia, Hodges received an appointment to the United States Military Academy (USMA) in West Point, New York. He would have graduated with the class of 1909, but instead was dismissed from the Academy after his first year because he failed a geometry course. He then worked at a grocery store for a year.

In 1906, Hodges enlisted in the United States Army as a private and was assigned to Company L, 17th Infantry, at Fort McPherson, Georgia. He was promoted to the rank of sergeant, and in 1909, he performed well on the examination for prospective officers. He was commissioned as a second lieutenant in the Infantry in November 1909, just a few months after his West Point classmates had graduated, and was assigned to the 13th Infantry. Early in his career, while stationed in the Philippines, he served with the future Army Chief of Staff, George C. Marshall, and later, while stationed in Mexico, he served with future General George S. Patton.

== Pancho Villa Expedition, World War I, and postwar years ==
Hodges served at Fort Leavenworth, Kansas, as well as in San Antonio, Texas, and the Philippines. His first significant military operation was under the command of Brigadier General John J. Pershing, who led an expedition into Mexico to capture Pancho Villa after Villa had raided the town of Columbus, New Mexico, in the spring of 1916.

Hodges served with the 6th Infantry Regiment, 5th Division, during World War I, which America entered in April 1917 (see American entry into World War I). He was promoted to lieutenant colonel and commanded a battalion in the 6th Infantry during the Saint-Mihiel and Meuse-Argonne campaigns of 1918. During the latter campaign, he led a scouting expedition across the Meuse River and penetrated the German lines, maintaining a bridgehead under 20 hours of constant enemy fire. His position became the leading point of the American advance across the Meuse. Over the course of the war, he earned the Distinguished Service Cross for extraordinary heroism while leading an attack across the Meuse River.

After occupation duty in Germany, Hodges spent the years 1920 to 1924 on the staff at West Point before attending and graduating from the United States Army Command and General Staff College in 1925. He then served as an instructor at the United States Army Infantry School, Fort Benning, Georgia, until 1926, and in a similar capacity at the Air Corps Tactical School at Maxwell Field, Alabama, until 1929.

For the next four years, he was a member of the Infantry Board at Fort Benning. Hodges then completed the United States Army War College in 1934. In 1938, he became an assistant commandant of the Army Infantry School before becoming commandant in 1940. While he was there, he formed a friendship with Omar Bradley, who would feature prominently in Hodges's future military career.

== World War II ==
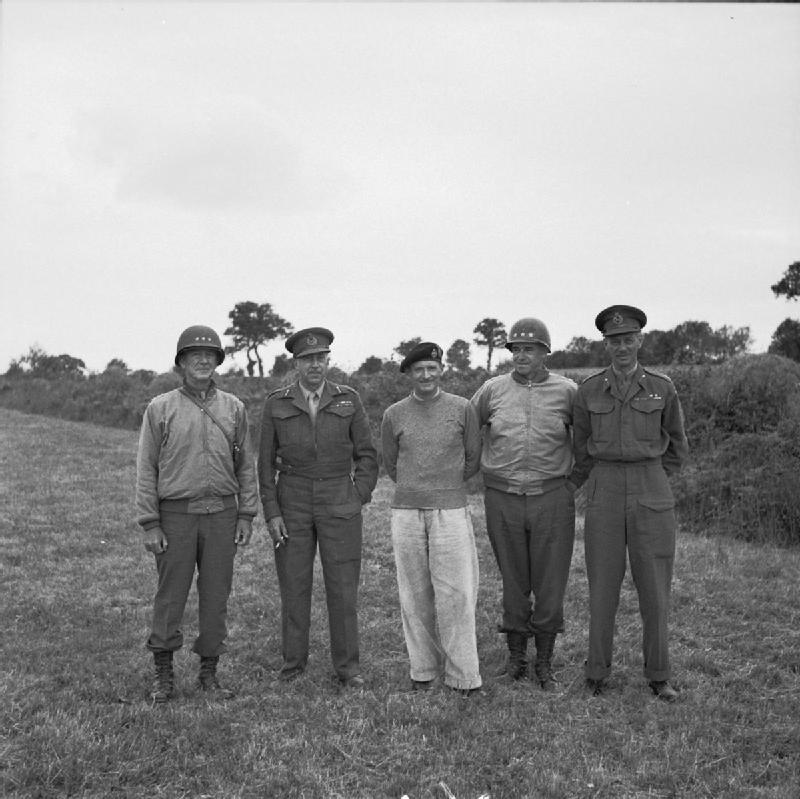
The Allied army commanders hold a conference in a hayfield in northwest France. Pictured are Lieutenant General Hodges, Lieutenant General Harry Crerar, commanding the Canadian First Army, General Sir Bernard Montgomery, commanding the Anglo-Canadian 21st Army Group, Lieutenant General Omar Bradley, commanding the 12th Army Group, and Lieutenant General Miles Dempsey, commanding the British Second Army

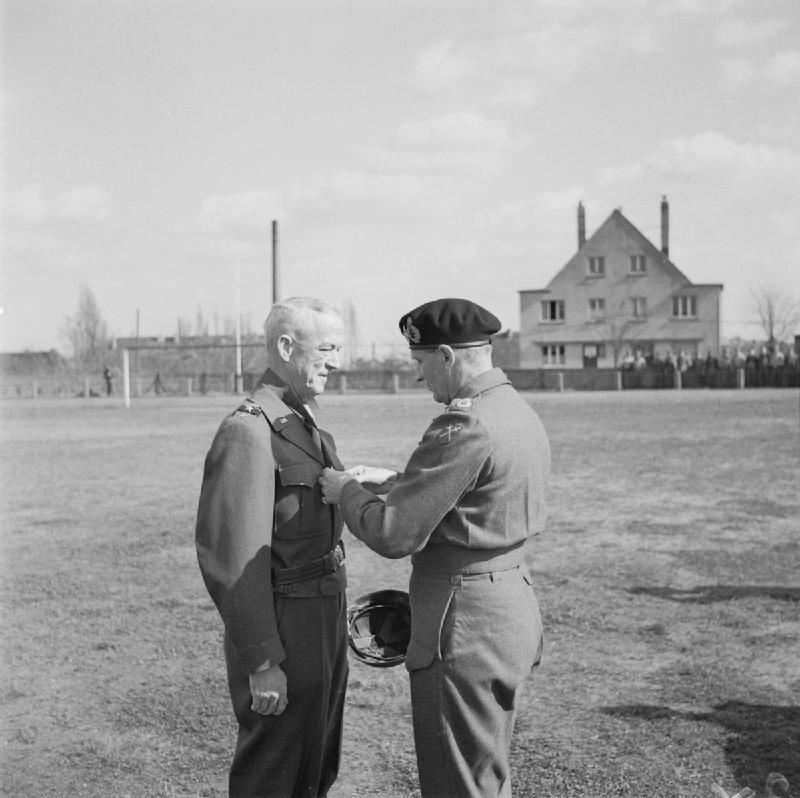
Lieutenant General Courtney H. Hodges, General Omar Bradley's deputy during the Normandy landings and subsequently commander of the U.S. First Army, part of the 12th Army Group, being decorated by Field Marshal Montgomery at Munchen Gladbach in Germany

In May 1941, Hodges was promoted to major general. He was given various assignments, including Chief of Infantry, until he received command of X Corps, which was stationed in the USA, in 1942. In 1943, having been promoted to lieutenant general, he continued to command X Corps and then the Third Army. When the Third Army moved from the United States to England for the projected invasion of Europe, command of the army was passed to General George Patton. Hodges was named deputy commanding general of the First Army under Lieutenant General Omar Bradley. During Operation Overlord in June and July 1944, Hodges served under Bradley as the deputy commander of the First Army. In August 1944, Hodges succeeded Bradley as the commander of the First Army, taking over when Bradley moved up to command the 12th Army Group. Hodges served under the command of Bradley and General Dwight D. Eisenhower until Nazi Germany's surrender in May 1945. By the time he took command, "it was the largest and most experienced American field army on the Western Front. Consisting of the V, VII, and XIX Corps and controlling nine divisions, it had approximately 250,000 men."

Hodges's First Army advanced across France to assist in the liberation of Paris on 25 August 1944, before advancing through France, Belgium, and Luxembourg on its way to Germany. His troops were the first Allied forces to penetrate Germany, reaching the German border northwest of Trier on 11 September 1944. The first unit to do so was the 5th Armored Division, part of Major General Leonard T. Gerow's V Corps.

Hodges's troops had a major role in halting the Wehrmacht's major counteroffensive in the Ardennes: the Battle of the Bulge. When the German advance cut the First Army off from Bradley's 12th Army Group, his First Army was placed under the temporary command of the Anglo-Canadian 21st Army Group, commanded by Field Marshal Bernard Montgomery, along with Ninth United States Army, on 20 December 1944. The First Army reverted to the 12th Army Group a few weeks later, on 17 January 1945.

Before, during, and after the Battle of the Bulge, the First Army fought the Germans in the Battle of Aachen and in the parallel five-month Battle of Hürtgen Forest to the southeast of Aachen, as part of the main U.S. effort to breach the Siegfried Line and advance through Germany to the Roer River. Hodges led the First Army in liberating most of Luxembourg in three days, between the 9th and 12 September 1944. The city of Aachen was captured on 22 October 1944, but the German counteroffensive in the Ardennes and the Battle of the Bulge took place before the army's other objectives could be completed. After the Battle of the Bulge, the Hürtgen Forest was secured, and on 10 February 1945 the Rur Dam was finally captured. The Siegfried Line campaign cost American forces nearly 140,000 casualties. The tremendous Allied losses sustained during the offensive into the Hürtgen Forest, led to the battle being described as an Allied "defeat of the first magnitude".

By 7 March 1945, the 9th Armored Division of the First Army had captured the Ludendorff Bridge at Remagen. The First Army was the first Allied army to cross the Rhine since the Napoleonic Wars. By the time the bridge collapsed ten days later, the First Army had built two heavy-duty bridges across the Rhine and established a bridgehead 40 km (25 mi) long, extending from Bonn in the north almost to Koblenz in the south, and 10 to 15 kilometers (6.2 to 9.3 mi) deep, held by five U.S. divisions. The army then advanced slowly while waiting for Montgomery and the 21st Army Group to launch Operation Plunder across the Rhine on 23 March 1945.

Together with the U.S. Ninth Army, the First Army encircled over 300,000 German troops in the Battle of Ruhr Pocket. A month later, Hodges's troops of the First Army met elements of the Soviet Red Army near Torgau on the Elbe River. Hodges was promoted to the rank of four-star general on 15 April 1945, thus becoming the first of two soldiers in the history of the United States Army to advance from private to general, the other being Walter Krueger, who served in the Southwest Pacific Theater. Bradley later wrote that Hodges and the First Army deserved significant credit for their performance during the conflict.

Eisenhower described Hodges as a central figure in the United States' advance into Germany and noted that his contributions were sometimes less prominently highlighted in the contemporary media than those of his peers.

After the end of World War II in Europe on 7 May 1945, Hodges and the First Army were ordered to prepare to be sent to the Pacific Theater for the proposed invasion of Japan from late 1945 to March 1946. However, that planned deployment was canceled following the surrender of Japan, with the official surrender documents signed in Tokyo Bay on 2 September 1945. Hodges was one of the few individuals present at the surrenders of both Nazi Germany in Reims, France, and the Empire of Japan in Tokyo Bay.

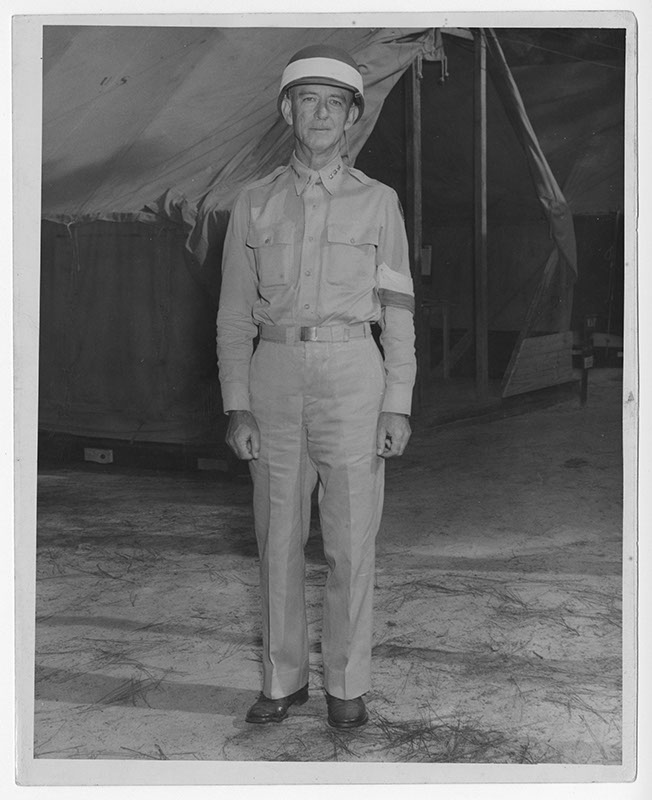
Lt. Gen. Courtney Hodges

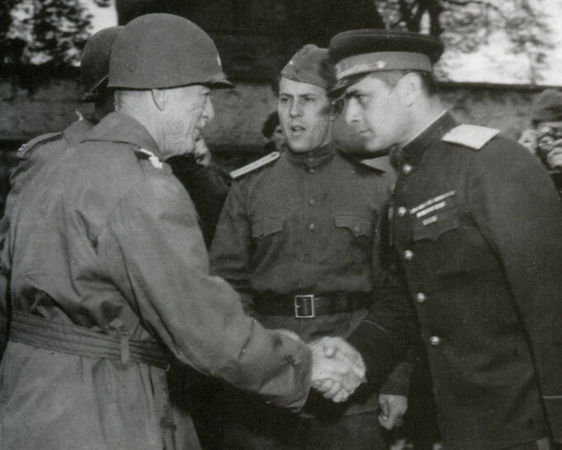
U.S. Army General Courtney Hodges (left) greets Soviet Army Major General Gleb Baklanov (right) after the meeting of Soviet and U.S. forces on the Elbe

== Post-war life ==
After World War II, Hodges continued in command of the First Army at Fort Jay on Governors Island, New York, until his retirement in March 1949. He later served as military advisor to Sir Owen Dixon, United Nations mediator to Kashmir.

== Personal life ==
On 22 June 1928, Hodges married Mildred Lee Buchner, a young widow. He reportedly courted her by inviting her along to walk his dog and go shooting. They had no children.

== Death and legacy ==
Hodges died in San Antonio, Texas, on 16 January 1966. He was buried at Arlington National Cemetery, Section 2, Grave 890-A.

In Perry, Georgia, the State Route 7 Spur, a former section of U.S. Route 41/State Route 7, was named General Courtney Hodges Boulevard. A road in Dinant (Belgium) is named Avenue Général Hodges. In Maastricht (Netherlands), the Generaal Hodgesstraat is named after him.

Although he possessed a military reputation as a firm and skilled commander, Hodges was quiet and little known to his troops despite significant efforts to enhance his image. Eisenhower characterized General Courtney Hodges as a leader of the United States' military advance into Germany. Eisenhower also worked to ensure that Hodges received recognition for his command, noting that Hodges appeared to receive less attention from contemporary news media than other military figures. In his postwar memoirs, Omar Bradley, who knew Hodges well, described him as a quiet Georgian whose tactical knowledge and infantry expertise made him one of the most skilled commanders among Bradley's commanders. Bradley wrote that only William H. Simpson rivaled Hodges among U.S. commanders, and that "of all my Army commanders he required the least supervision".

Hodges has been criticized for his decision to launch a failed offensive into the Hürtgen Forest, leading to a costly battle described as an Allied "defeat of the first magnitude". British historian Jonathan Trigg called it one of the "most ill-conceived and unnecessary offensives of the whole northwest Europe campaign", adding that Hodges "lacked tactical imagination" and that "it was a miracle that he retained Eisenhower’s confidence". Historian Antony Beevor described Hodges as a reluctant commander who did not make quick decisions, "believed in simply going head-on at the enemy”, and lacked an "imagination for manoeuvre". According to Beevor, Hodges' decision to attack straight through the Hürtgen Forest led to "the most gruesome part of the whole north-west Europe campaign."

Hodges himself wrote in his war diaries that "too many of these battalions and regiments of ours have tried to flank and skirt their way around and never meet the enemy straight on." and that it was "safer sounder and in the end quicker to keep smashing ahead." As part of his rationale for the direct attack on the forest.

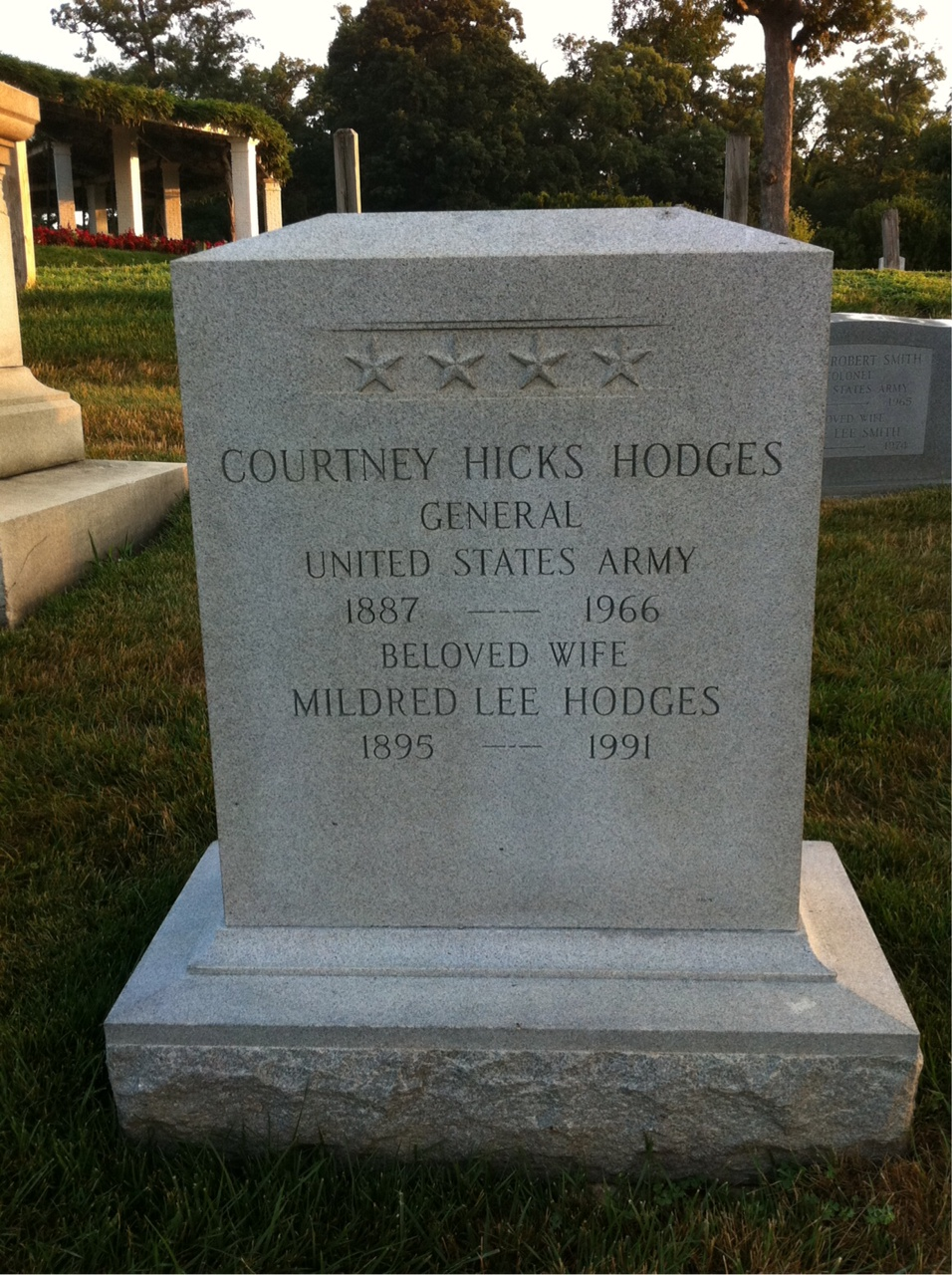
Headstone in Arlington National Cemetery

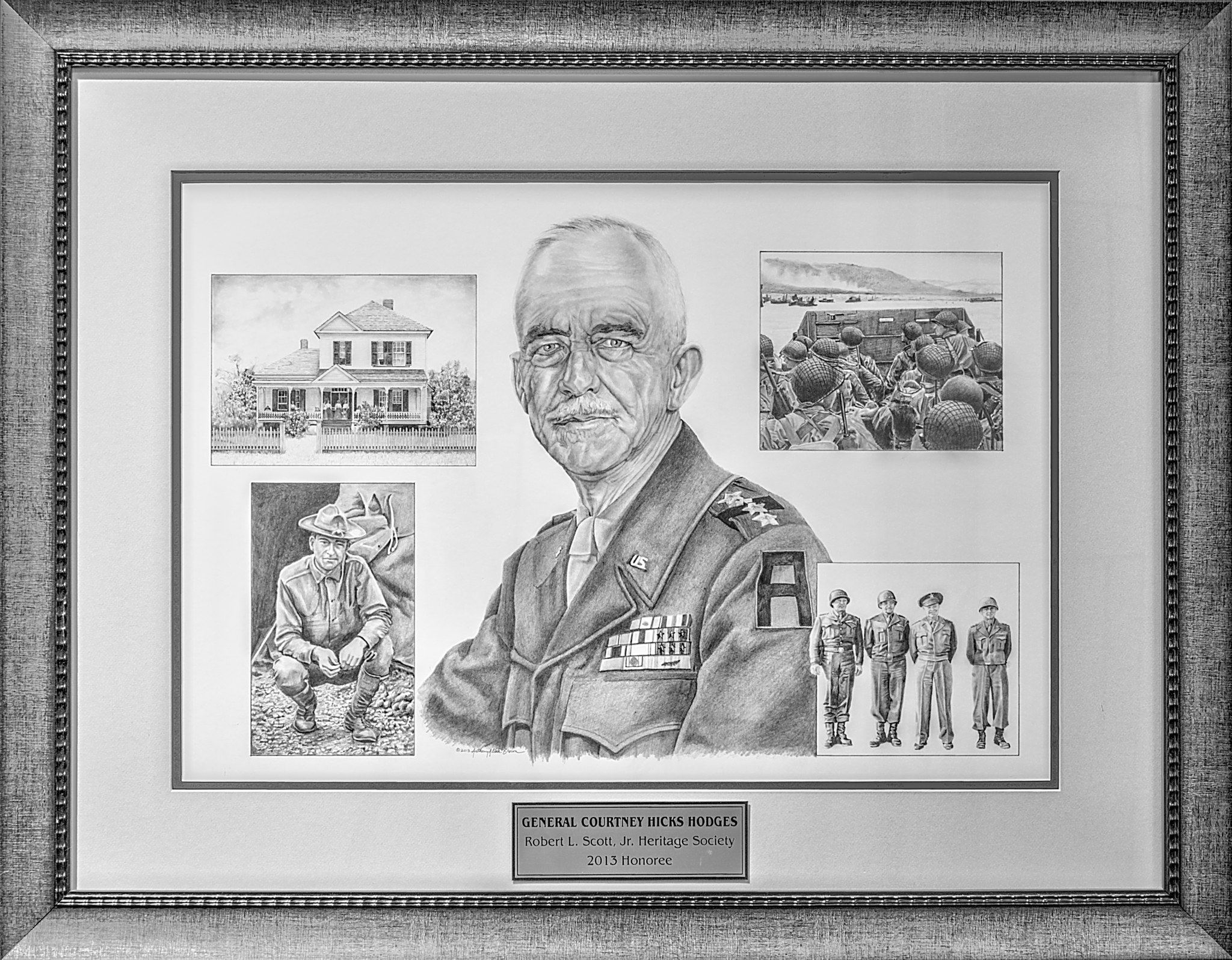
Composite portrait of General Hodges at the Museum of Aviation

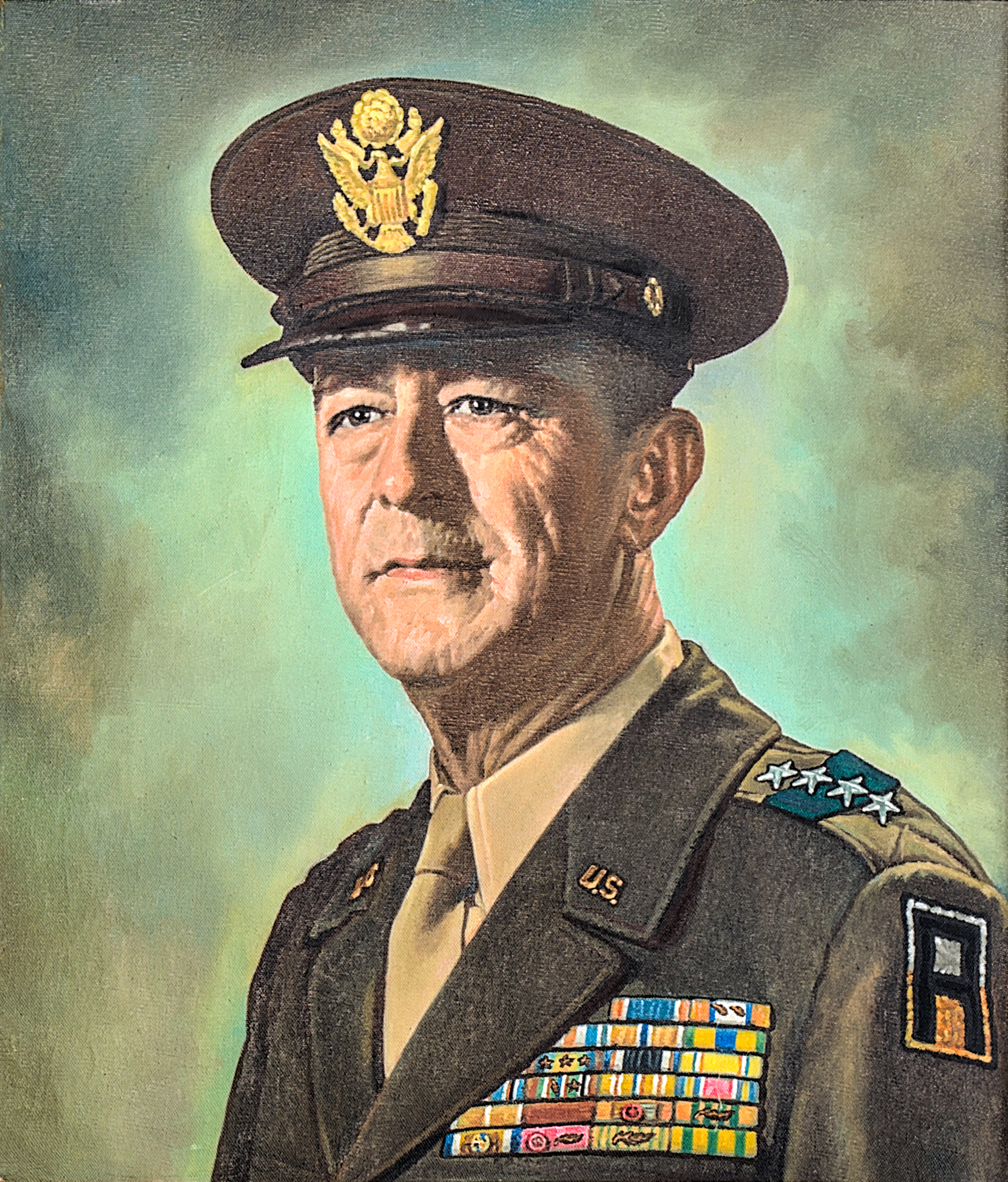
Painting of General Hodges at the Perry Area Historical Museum in Perry, Georgia

== Awards ==
Hodges's honors and awards included:

=== United States ===
Distinguished Service Cross
Army Distinguished Service Medal with two Oak Leaf Clusters
Silver Star
Bronze Star Medal
Mexican Service Medal
World War I Victory Medal with three Campaign Stars
Army of Occupation of Germany Medal
American Defense Service Medal
American Campaign Medal
Asiatic-Pacific Campaign Medal
European-African-Middle Eastern Campaign Medal with five service stars
World War II Victory Medal

=== Foreign orders and decorations ===
- Knight Commander of the Order of the British Empire (United Kingdom)
- Grand Officer of the Legion of Honour (France)
- Grand Officer of the Order of Leopold (Belgium)
- Companion of the Order of the Bath (United Kingdom)
- Grand Officer of the Order of the Liberator San Martín (Argentina)
- Order of Suvorov First Class (Union of Soviet Socialist Republics)
- Order of the Oak Crown (Luxembourg)
- Croix de Guerre 1939-1945 with palm (France)
- Croix de Guerre 1939–1945 with palm (Belgium)

=== Distinguished Service Cross citation ===
"The President of the United States of America, authorized by Act of Congress, 9 July 1918, takes pleasure in presenting the Distinguished Service Cross to Lieutenant Colonel (Infantry) Courtney Hicks Hodges (ASN: 0–2686), United States Army, for extraordinary heroism in action while serving with 6th Infantry Regiment, 5th Division, A.E.F., near Brieulles, France, 2–4 November 1918. Lieutenant Colonel Hodges personally conducted a reconnaissance of the Meuse River to determine the most advantageous location for a crossing and for a bridge site. Having organised a storming party, he attacked the enemy not 100 paces distant, and, although failing, he managed to effect the crossing of the canal after 20 hours of ceaseless struggling. His fearlessness and courage were mainly responsible for the advance of his brigade to the heights east of the Meuse."

Division: 5th Division, American Expeditionary Forces General Orders: War Department, General Orders No. 3 (1919)

== Dates of rank ==
Insignia	Rank	Component	Date
No insignia	Cadet	United States Military Academy	16 June 1904 (Resigned 17 June 1905)
Various	Enlisted	Regular Army	1 May 1906
No insignia in 1909	Second lieutenant	Regular Army	13 November 1909
	First lieutenant	Regular Army	1 July 1916
	Captain	Regular Army	15 May 1917
	Major	National Army	7 June 1918
	Lieutenant colonel	National Army	31 October 1918
	Major	Regular Army	1 July 1920
	Lieutenant colonel	Regular Army	1 October 1934
	Colonel	Regular Army	1 October 1938
	Brigadier general	Regular Army	1 April 1940
	Major general	Regular Army	31 May 1941
	Lieutenant general	Army of the United States	16 February 1943
	General	Army of the United States	15 April 1945
	General	Retired List	31 March 1949

== Footnotes ==
Military offices
Preceded by Asa L. Singleton	Commandant of the United States Army Infantry School; 1940–1941	Succeeded by Omar Bradley
Preceded by Newly activated organization	Commanding General X Corps; 1942–1943	Succeeded by Jonathan W. Anderson
Preceded by Walter Krueger	Commanding General Third Army; 1943–1944	Succeeded by George S. Patton
Preceded by Omar Bradley	Commanding General First Army; 1944–1949	Succeeded by Roscoe B. Woodruff
