= 1944 Hürtgen Forest Museum =

Military history museum in Vossenack, Germany

Coordinates: 50.686993°N 6.369535°E

- Museum Hürtgenwald 1944 und im Frieden
- Logo

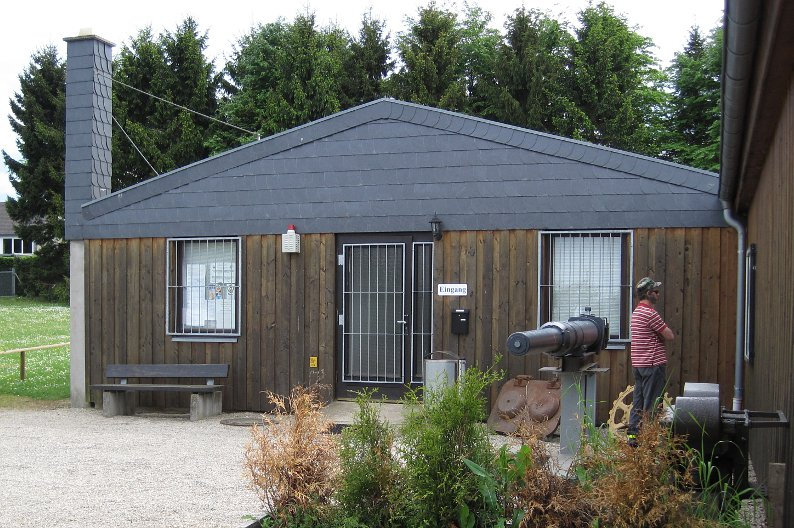
- Museum entrance in 2010
- Established: 29 March 1983
- Location: Hürtgen Forest
- Type: War museum
- Owner: Hürtgen Forest History Society
- Website: museum-huertgenwald.de

The 1944 Hürtgen Forest Museum (German: Museum Hürtgenwald 1944 und im Frieden) is located in Vossenack, in the municipality of Hürtgenwald, in the county of Düren, in the German state of North Rhine-Westphalia.

The 1944 Hürtgen Forest Peace Museum (Friedensmuseum Hürtgenwald 1944) was opened on 29 March 1983 in Kleinhau in a stone barn. Its aim was to recall the heavy fighting during the Second World War in the Battle of Hürtgen Forest. In setting up the museum, Konrad Schall from Winden gathered many exhibits: vehicles, documents, uniforms, and other artefacts that witness to the battles in the surrounding area.

Later, part of the exhibition was taken over by the municipality from Schall's legacy. It in turn transferred the exhibit to the Hürtgen Forest History Society (Geschichtsverein Hürtgenwald). On 15 September 2001, the current 1944 Hürtgen Forest Museum (Museum Hürtgenwald 1944 und im Frieden) was opened.

The peace museum is divided into the following themed rooms:

- Hürtgen Forest Local History
- The Siegfried Line in the area of the Hürtgen Forest
- Card room
- The Wehrmacht in the Hürtgen Forest
- The US Army in the Hürtgen Forest
- The Hürtgen Forest in the postwar period
