= Brieulles =

Brieulles may refer to two communes in France:

- Brieulles-sur-Bar, in the Ardennes department
- Brieulles-sur-Meuse, in the Meuse department
