= Battle of Hürtgen Forest =

Series of battles during World War II

- Part of the Western Front of World War II
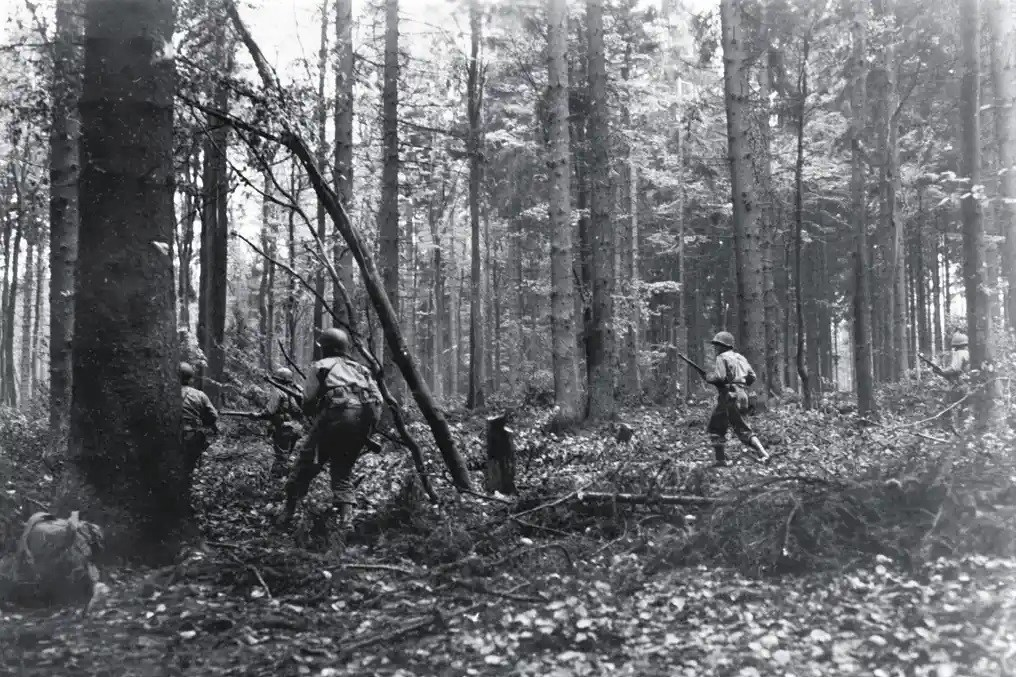
- Troops of the 28th Infantry Division advancing through the dense woodland of the Hürtgen Forest, November 2, 1944
Date	19 September – 16 December 1944 (2 months, 3 weeks and 6 days)
Location	50°42′31″N 6°21′46″E; North Rhine-Westphalia, Germany
Result	German victory

Belligerents
United States	Germany

Commanders and leaders
(United States) Omar Bradley (United States) Courtney Hodges	(Nazi Germany) Walter Model

Strength
120,000	80,000

Casualties and losses
Total number 33,000 to 55,000 casualties	About 28,000 casualties

The Battle of Hürtgen Forest (German: Schlacht im Hürtgenwald) was a series of battles fought from 19 September to 16 December 1944, between American and German forces on the Western Front during World War II, in the Hürtgen Forest, a 140 km^{2} (54 mi^{2}) area about 5 km (3.1 mi) east of the Belgian–German border. Lasting 88 days, it was the longest battle on German ground during World War II and it is the second longest single battle the U.S. Army has ever fought after the three-month-long Battle of Bataan.

The U.S. commanders' initial goal was to pin down German forces in the area to keep them from reinforcing the front lines farther north in the Battle of Aachen, where the US forces were fighting against the Siegfried Line network of fortified industrial towns and villages speckled with pillboxes, tank traps, and minefields. The Americans' initial tactical objectives were to take the village of Schmidt and clear Monschau. In a second phase the Allies wanted to advance to the Rur River as part of Operation Queen.

Generalfeldmarschall Walter Model intended to bring the Allied thrust to a standstill. While he interfered less in the day-to-day movements of units than at the Battle of Arnhem, he still kept himself fully informed on the situation, slowing the Allies' progress, inflicting heavy casualties, and taking full advantage of the fortifications the Germans called the Westwall, and which the Allies knew as the Siegfried Line. The Hürtgen Forest cost the U.S. First Army at least 33,000 killed and wounded, including both combat and non-combat losses, with upper estimates at 55,000; German casualties were 28,000. The city of Aachen in the north eventually fell on 22 October at high cost to the U.S. Ninth Army, but they failed to cross the Rur river or wrest control of its dams from the Germans. The battle was so costly that it has been described as an Allied "defeat of the first magnitude," with specific credit given to Model.

The Germans fiercely defended the area because it served as a staging area for the 1944 winter offensive Wacht am Rhein (known in English-speaking countries as the Battle of the Bulge), and because the mountains commanded access to the Rur Dam (Note: The Rur Dam holds back the Rurstausee and is the major structure in a network. Upstream are other, smaller, structures: the Paulushof Dam holding the Obersee and the Urft Dam holding the Urftstausee. If the floodgates were opened, the resulting surge would flood low-lying areas downstream and temporarily prevent forces from crossing the river.) at the head of the Rur Reservoir (Rurstausee). The Allies failed to capture the area after several heavy setbacks, and the Germans successfully held the region until they launched their last-ditch offensive into the Ardennes. This was launched on 16 December and ended the Hürtgen offensive. The Battle of the Bulge gained widespread press and public attention, leaving the battle of Hürtgen Forest less well remembered.

The overall cost of the Siegfried Line campaign in American personnel was close to 140,000.

== Background ==
By mid-September 1944, the Allied pursuit of the German army after the landings at Normandy was slowing down due to extended supply lines and increasing German resistance. The next strategic objective was to move up to the Rhine River along its entire length and prepare to cross it. Courtney Hodges′ First Army experienced hard resistance pushing through the Aachen Gap and perceived a potential threat from enemy forces using the Hürtgen Forest as a base.

The U.S. 1st Infantry Division arrived in early October, joining elements of the XIX Corps and VII Corps, which had encircled Aachen. Although the 1st Infantry Division called for the surrender of the German garrison in the city, German commander Oberst Gerhard Wilck refused to capitulate until 21 October.

The Allies also thought it was necessary to remove the threat posed by the Rur Dam. The stored water could be released by the Germans, swamping any forces operating downstream. In the view of the American commanders, Omar Bradley, Hodges, and J. Lawton Collins, the direct route to the dam was through the forest.

Some military historians are no longer convinced by these arguments. Charles B. MacDonald—a U.S. Army historian and former company commander who served in the Hürtgen battle—has described it as "...a misconceived and basically fruitless battle that should have been avoided."

== Geography ==
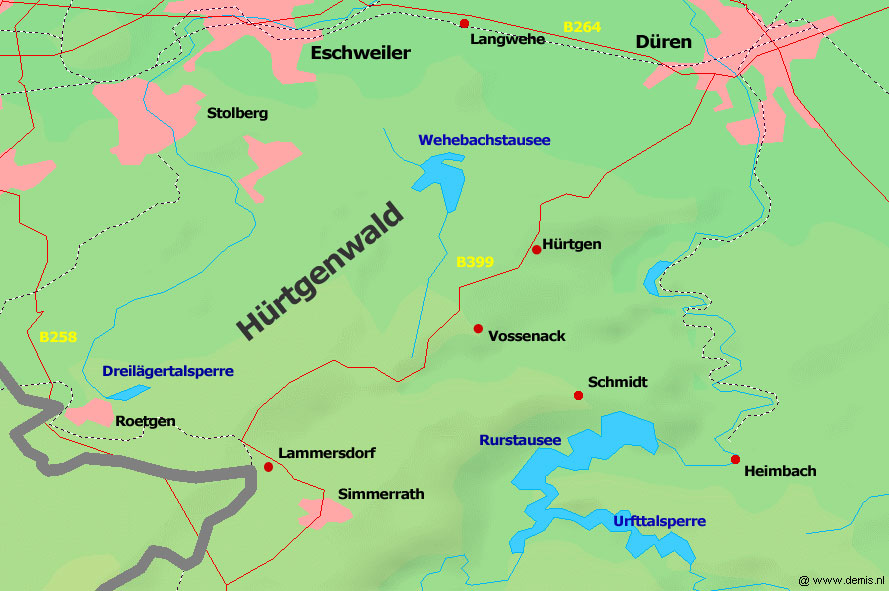
Map showing the area of the battle

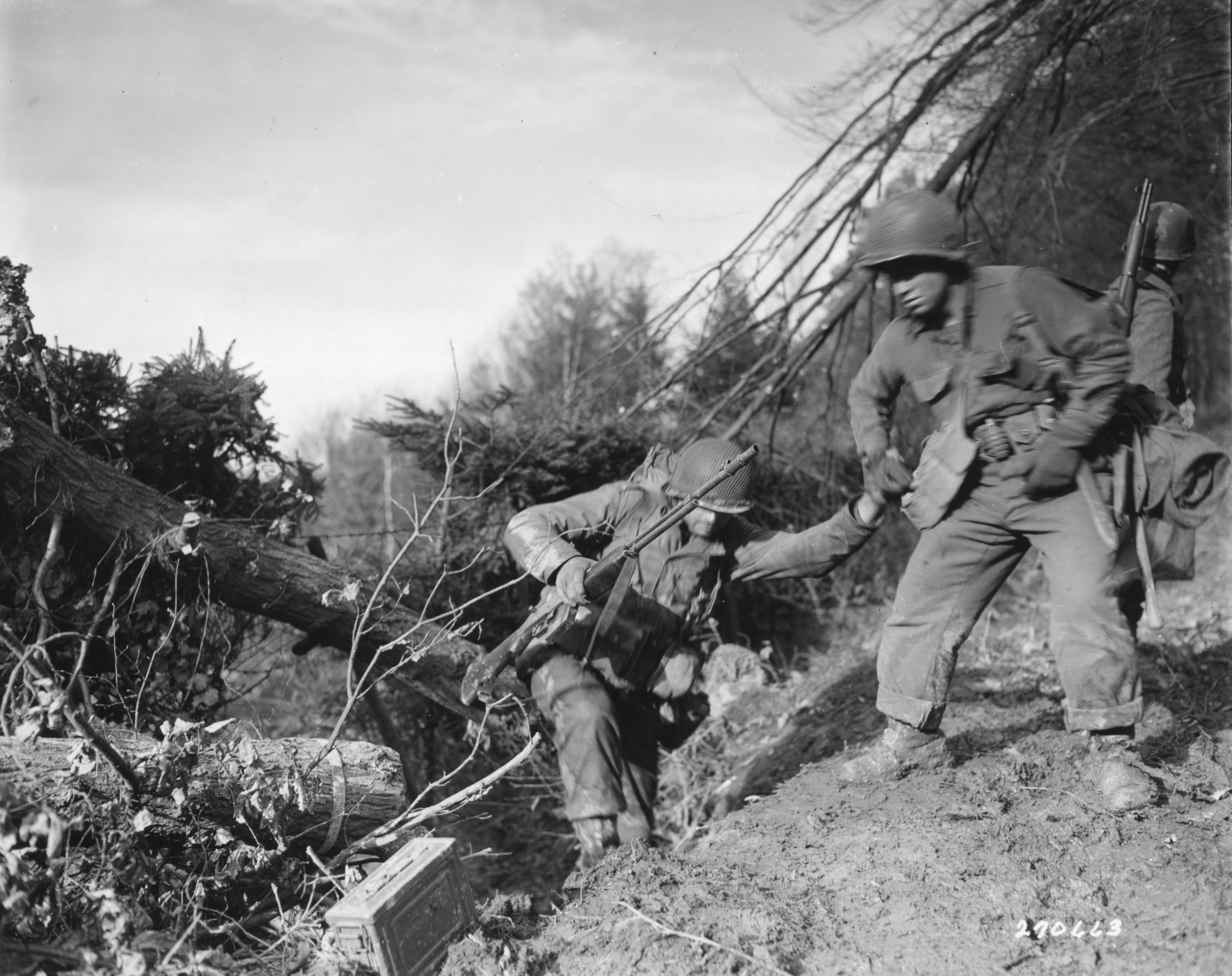
Soldiers of 3rd Battalion, 8th Infantry Regiment, 4th Infantry Division, moving through difficult terrain and trees broken by artillery. Hürtgen Forest, southwest of Düren, 18 November, 1944.

The Hürtgen Forest occupies a rugged area between the Rur River and Aachen. In the autumn and early winter of 1944, the weather was cold, wet, and cloudy, and often prevented air support. Apart from the poor weather, the dense forest and rough terrain also prevented proper use of Allied air superiority, which had great difficulties in spotting any targets. The dense conifer forest is broken by few roads, tracks, and firebreaks, it is also riven by deep ravines and had many steep slopes, restricting vehicular movement. The steep winding tracks sometimes turned into a muddy morass, further impeding vehicular traffic, especially heavy vehicles such as tanks. Equipment-laden infantry likewise had difficulty traversing the terrain, and often lost their footing on the slopes.

The German defenders had prepared the area with improvised blockhouses, minefields, barbed wire, and booby-traps, hidden by the mud and snow. There were also numerous concrete bunkers in the southern forests, mostly belonging to the deep defenses of the Siegfried Line, which were also centers of resistance. To increase the defensive value of the terrain, the Germans cut narrow lanes into the forest so their machine guns had clear fields of fire and toppled trees in specific locations in an effort to channelize the impending attack. The few available trails were extensively mined. The dense forest allowed infiltration and flanking attacks, and it was sometimes difficult to establish a front line or to be confident that an area had been cleared of the enemy. The small numbers of routes and clearings in the forest had also allowed German machine gun, mortar, and artillery teams to pre-range their weapons and fire accurately. Navigation through the terrain was difficult, as American infantry would sometimes have to request artillery fire to reorientate themselves.

The American advantage in numbers (as high as 5:1), armor, mobility, and air support was thus greatly negated by weather and terrain. In the forest, relatively small numbers of determined and prepared defenders could be highly effective. To exacerbate matters, as the American divisions took casualties, inexperienced replacements had to be fed directly into combat.

The densely forested terrain also limited the use of tanks and provided cover for German anti-tank teams equipped with Panzerfaust shaped-charge grenade launchers. The Allies made improvised rocket launchers, using rocket tubes from aircraft and spare Jeep trailers. Later in the battle, it proved necessary to blast tank routes through the forest. Transportation was similarly limited by the lack of routes: at critical times, it proved difficult to reinforce or supply front-line units or to evacuate the dead and wounded.

The Germans were hampered by much the same difficulties, worsened because their divisions had already taken heavy losses on the retreat through France and were hastily filled up with untrained boys and old men, often unfit for normal military service. Reinforcements thrown into the fighting include Arbeitsbattalion (work battalion) men and Luftwaffe officer cadets. Transportation was also a problem, because of the difficult roads and the lack of trucks and fuel; most supplies had to be manhandled to the front line. Nonetheless, despite increasing numbers of replacements lacking experience, German defenders had the advantage in that their commanders and many of their soldiers had been fighting for years, many had learned the necessary tactics for fighting efficiently in winter and forested areas. German commanders could also rely on local foresters for accurate intelligence. The Americans on the other hand were often better trained but inexperienced.

== Order of battle ==
The Hürtgen Forest lay within the area of the U.S. First Army under Hodges. Responsibility fluctuated between the V Corps and VII Corps.

At the start, the forest was defended by the German 275th and 353rd Infantry Divisions; understrength but well prepared—5,000 men (1,000 in reserve)—and commanded by Generalleutnant Hans Schmidt. They had little artillery and no tanks. As the battle progressed, German reinforcements were added. American expectations that these troops were weak and ready to withdraw were overly optimistic.

The following units were not committed simultaneously:

=== U.S. divisions and formations ===
- 1st Infantry Division (Maj. Gen. Clarence R. Huebner)
- 4th Infantry Division (Maj. Gen. Raymond O. Barton)
- 8th Infantry Division (Maj. Gen. Donald A. Stroh)
- 9th Infantry Division (Maj. Gen. Louis A. Craig)
- 28th Infantry Division (Maj. Gen. Norman Cota)
- 29th Infantry Division (Elements) (Maj. Gen. Charles H. Gerhardt)
- 78th Infantry Division (Maj. Gen. Edwin P. Parker Jr.)
- 82nd Airborne Division (Maj. Gen. James M. Gavin)
- 83rd Infantry Division (Maj. Gen. Robert C. Macon)
- 99th Infantry Division (Maj. Gen. Walter E. Lauer)
- 104th Infantry Division (Maj. Gen. Terry de la Mesa Allen Sr.)
- 3rd Armored Division (Maj. Gen. Maurice Rose)
- 5th Armored Division (Maj. Gen. Lunsford E. Oliver)
- 893rd Tank Destroyer Battalion (Lt. Col. Samuel E. Mays)
- 2nd Ranger Battalion
- 5th Ranger Battalion
- 366th Fighter Group

=== German divisions ===
- 89th Infantry Division
- 275th Infantry Division
- 344th Infantry Division
- 347th Infantry Division
- 353rd Infantry Division
- 3rd Parachute Division
- 3rd Panzergrenadier Division
- 116th Panzer Division
- 12th Volksgrenadier Division
- 47th Volksgrenadier Division
- 246th Volksgrenadier Division
- 272nd Volksgrenadier Division
- 326th Volksgrenadier Division

== Battle ==
=== First phase ===
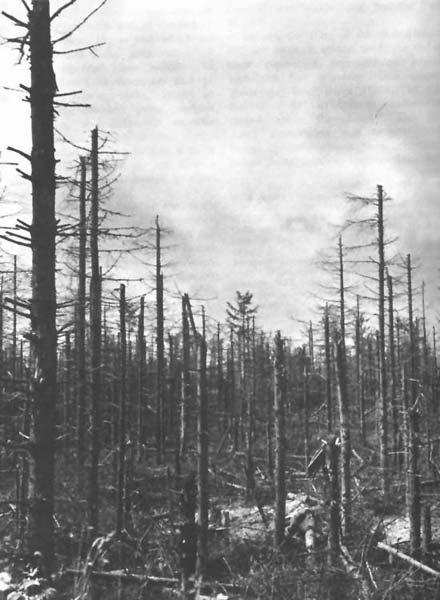
Artillery-damaged trees in the Hürtgen Forest

The 9th Infantry Division's ultimate objective were the Rur River crossings at Düren. On September 16, 1944, an attack by the 47th Infantry Regiment captured Schevenhütte, on the northern fringes of the forest, with few casualties. The division had surprised the Germans, but lacked the strength to push on as two of their regiments were committed to the south. Attacks on and around the Höfen-Alzen ridge by the 39th and 60th Infantry Regiments were met with heavy resistance and pushed back. The 1st and 2nd Battalions of the 39th captured Lammersdorf, but could not dislodge enemies entrenched in the woods behind the village; the 3rd Battalion suffered heavy losses attacking Hill 554, near Lammersdorf. In these early engagements, the 9th Infantry Division was unable to eject the Germans from the periphery of the forest, and decided to push through it to the northeast and capture Hürtgen and Kleinhau. The engagement began on September 19, 1944. Repeated probes entered the forest toward their objective, but were beaten back by the terrain and Germans dug into prepared positions. On October 5, the 39th and 60th Infantry Regiments attacked towards the town of Schmidt while the 47th held a defensive position. The Monschau-Düren road was quickly cut, but both regiments were slowed by defenses and suffered significant casualties: The 60th's 2nd Battalion was reduced to a third after the first day. The 39th was halted at the Weisser Weh Creek; there were problems with narrow paths, air bursts in trees, and fire breaks which were blocked or enfiladed. Evacuation and supply was difficult or impossible. By 16 October, 3,000 yd (2,700 m) had been gained at the cost of 4,500 casualties. The U.S. 28th Infantry Division—a Pennsylvania National Guard unit—arrived the same day to relieve the battered 9th. Cota established his division command post in the village of Rott on 25 October and began coordination with the V Corps staff for future operations as his units began to occupy the 9th's positions north of Lammersdorf.

When Cota received the operations order for the attack he was perplexed and none too happy. It was far too directive and detailed and left little for him, his staff and his regimental commanders to do except execute it. It was basically the same plan that had been given to the 9th Infantry Division and that plan had failed. Hodges dictated that the 28th was to capture Vossenack and the treeline facing the village of Huertgen. Gerow directed that an entire regiment would assault Huertgen to the north; a second regiment would attack and capture Schmidt in the center and a third regiment attack south towards Raffelsbrand. The 28th Division was reinforced with the attached 707th Tank Battalion, tracked M29 Weasel transport and air support. Of its three regiments, one was deployed to protect the northern flank, another to attack Germeter, and the third to capture Schmidt, the main objective. The area had terrible terrain with the Kall Trail running along a deep river ravine. The terrain was not suited to tanks, despite the need for armor to support the infantry.

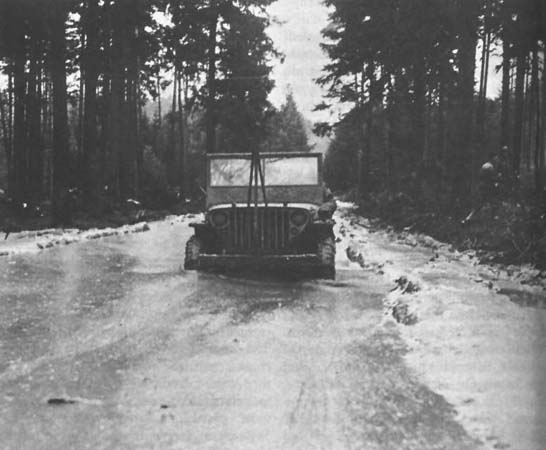
An American Jeep moving through a sea of mud in the Hürtgen Forest

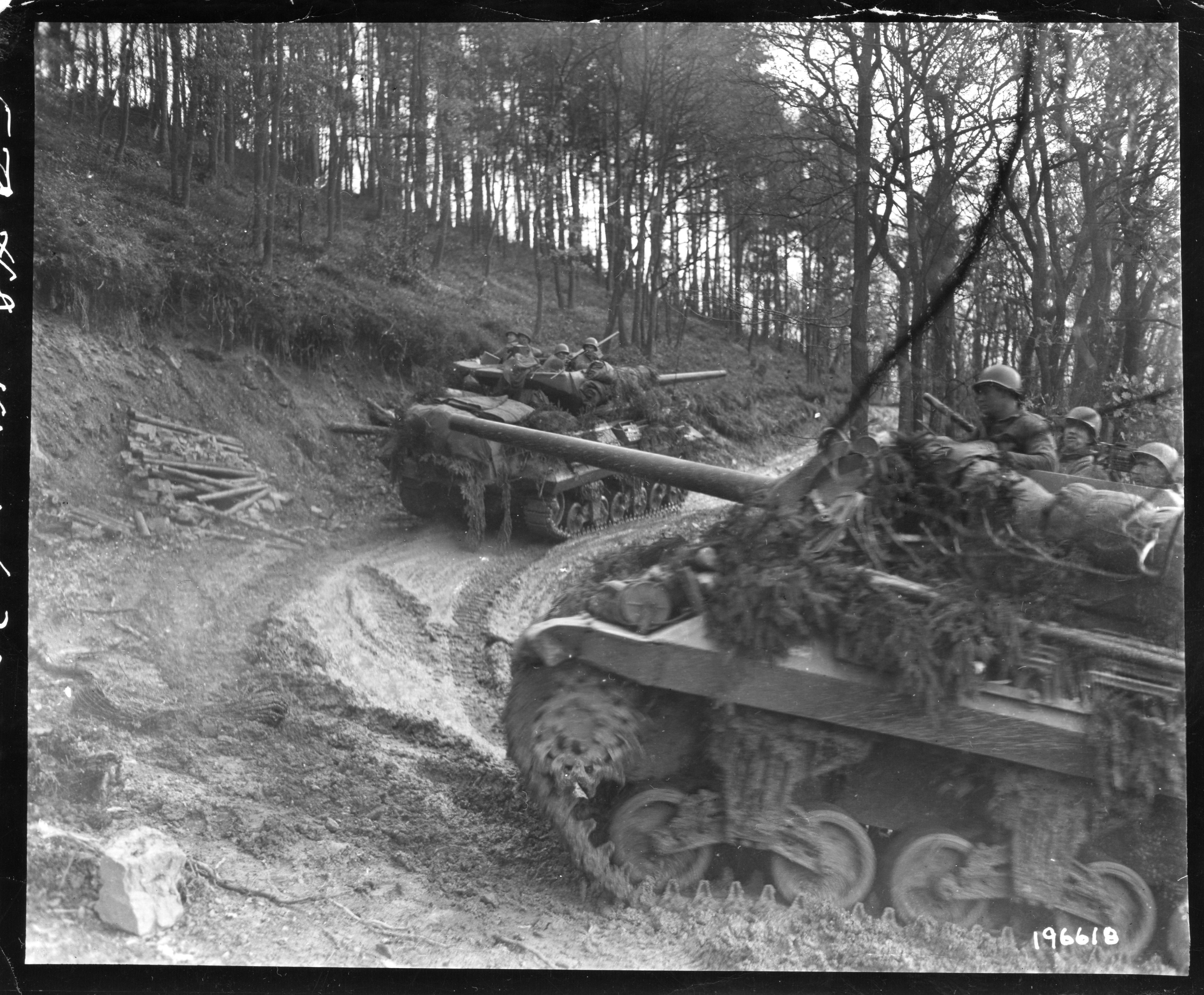
Camouflaged M10 tank destroyers moving up a winding forest trail, November 1944

"It was during the final days of preparation before the attack that Cota made three crucial mistakes that would have far reaching effects on his division's assault into the Huertgen. The first was that neither he nor his staff directed subordinate units to conduct patrolling into the Huertgen Forest [...]; the second mistake was tied to the first. Cota had approved the extremely narrow Kall trail to serve as the division's main supply route [...]. Aerial reconnaissance could not confirm the trail's condition due to the dense forest covering it but ground patrols would have provided much valuable information, both about the enemy and the trail. The third mistake was his decision not to use armor to support his infantry. Believing that the forest would not allow access and the required road network to support tanks, he kept all but two of his tank companies and all of his tank destroyer units in the rear to augment his division artillery. Had he discussed this with the commander of 9th Infantry Division, he would have learned that tanks could operate in many areas of the forest and with some training and prior coordination they could provide valuable support to the infantry."

The attack by the 28th Division started on 2 November; the defenders were expecting it and were ready. The U.S. 109th Infantry Regiment, assigned to capture the woods north of Germeter, was impeded after 300 yards (270 m) by an unexpected minefield (the "Wild Pig"), pinned down by mortar and artillery fire and harassed by local counterattacks. Just one mile (1.6 km) was gained after two days, after which the 109th dug in and endured casualties. This initial attack was nearly all the ground the 109th would take during the battle. The U.S. 110th Infantry Regiment had to clear the woods next to the Kall River, capture Simonskall, and maintain a supply route for the advance on Schmidt: Again, these were very difficult tasks due to weather, prepared defenses, determined defenders, and terrain. The weather prevented tactical air support until 5 November.

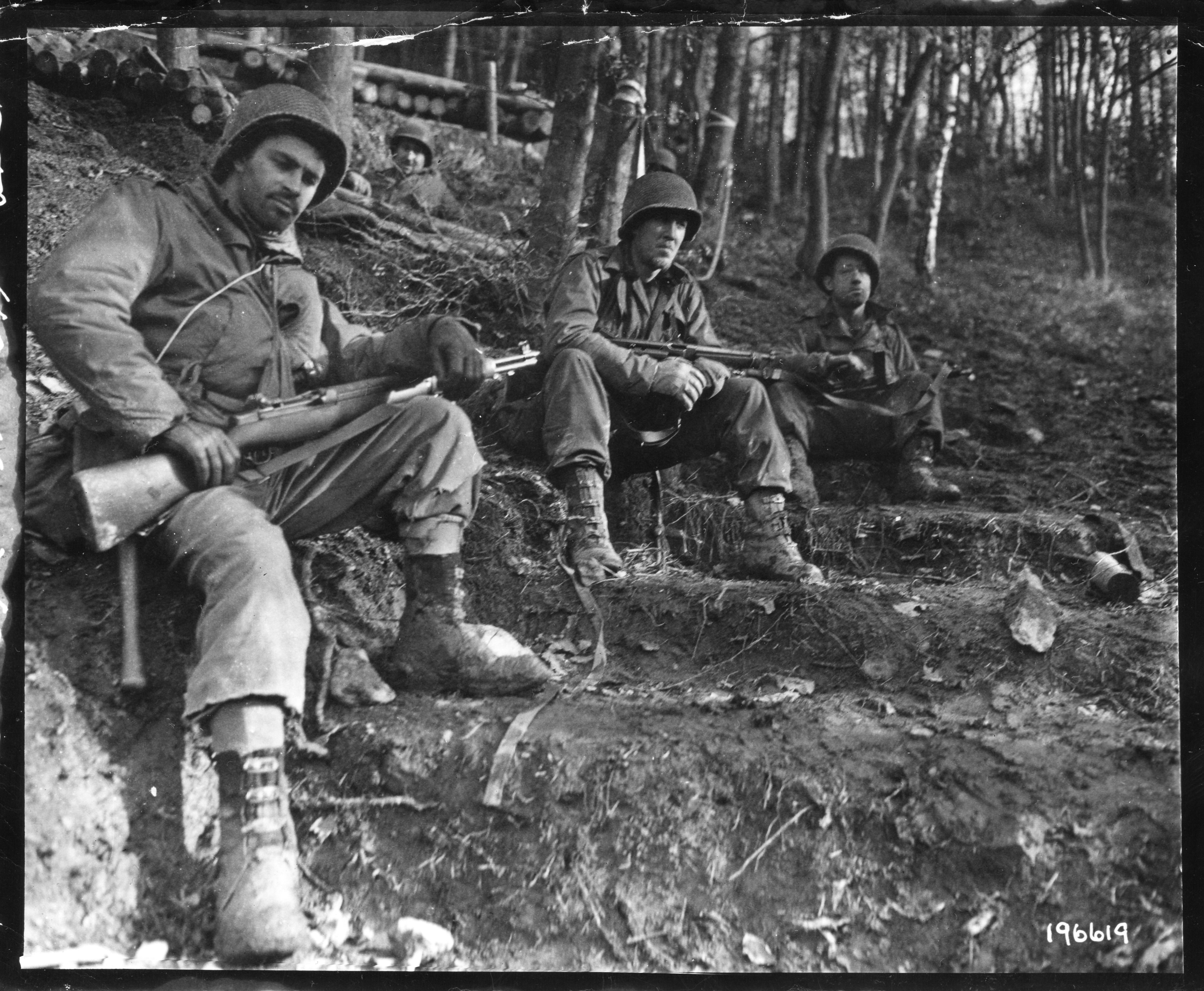
American infantrymen resting on a slope in the Hürtgen Forest, 18 November 1944

The U.S. 112th Infantry Regiment, attacking from Germeter, took Vossenack and the neighboring ridge by the afternoon. The 112th was then halted by strong defenses and difficult terrain. The 1st and 3rd Battalions of the 112th moved across the Kall Valley and captured Kommerscheidt and Schmidt, respectively, on 3 November. The German supply route to Monschau was cut, but American supply, reinforcement, and evacuation were very limited as the Kall Trail had poor terrain and was infiltrated by the Germans. At dawn on November 4, a strong German counter-attack by tanks of the 116th Panzer Division and a chance encirclement by troops from the 89th Infantry Division rapidly expelled the 3rd Battalion from Schmidt, and they were unable to counter-attack. The battalion disintegrated after constant shelling and a fierce attack by the 116th Panzer Division and some men inadvertently fled east, to be captured by the Germans. The rest of the battalion retreated to Kommerscheidt to join the 112th's 1st Battalion. Realizing the gravity of the situation, eight M4 Shermans of Company A, 707th Tank Battalion attempted to cross the Kall Valley, but only three actually made it across to support the beleaguered 112th. The 116th Panzer Division again attacked with tanks and infantry several times. The American tanks, along with infantry and air support, destroyed five German Panzer IV tanks. At Vossenack, the 112th's 2nd Battalion was nearly forced out of the town on November 6 by a fierce German counterattack, but were assisted by engineers in retaking the western part of the town. The Americans across the Kall Valley at Kommerscheidt held on until November 8, when an order to withdraw was given. The positions at Schmidt and the Kall Trail were abandoned. It wasn't until February 1945 that the 82nd Airborne Division permanently captured the Kall Trail and Schmidt.

A German regimental doctor, Hauptmann Günter Stüttgen, negotiated an unofficial ceasefire with the Americans at the Kall Bridge from 7–12 November, in order to attend to the wounded of both sides, numbering in the thousands. The lives of many American soldiers were saved by German medics.

Throughout November and December, it rained and snowed daily as temperatures hovered close to freezing. The soil of Hurtgen had a high clay content, which resulted in a slippery mud that clung to everything in touched. Trails became axel deep in mud only after a handful of vehicles used them.

=== Second phase ===
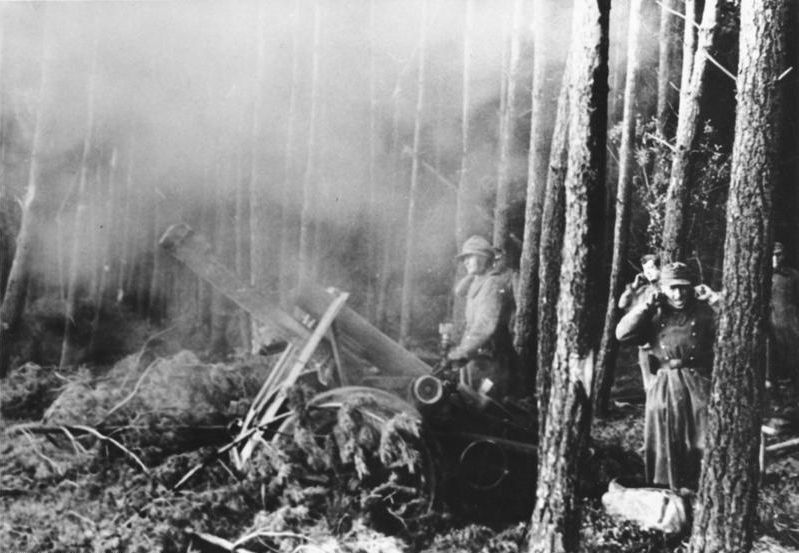
A German infantry gun firing in defense against a U.S. attack on 22 November 1944 in the Hürtgen forest

The second phase was part of Operation Queen, the Allied thrust to the Rur River. In this phase, the U.S. 4th Infantry Division was to clear the northern half of the forest between Schevenhütte and Hürtgen, capture Hürtgen, and advance to the Rur south of Düren. From 10 November, this would be VII Corps′ responsibility and it was part of the main VII Corps effort to reach the Rur. The 4th Division was now fully committed to the Hürtgen, although its 12th Infantry Regiment was already mauled from its action at Schmidt, leaving just two fully effective regiments to achieve the divisional objectives. U.S. VII Corps was opposed by German forces, mainly from the LXXXI Corps, consisting of three understrength divisions. In the Hürtgen, there was the 275th Infantry Division—6,500 men with 150 artillery pieces. They were well dug-in and prepared.

The abstract of a U.S. report describes what happened:

The VII (U.S.) Corps, First Army attacked 16 November 1944, with 1st Inf Div, 4th Inf Div, 104th Inf Div, and CCR 5th AD to clear Huertgen Forest and the path of First Army to the Rur River. After heavy fighting, primarily by the 4th Infantry Division, VII Corps' attack ground to a halt. V Corps was committed on 21 November 1944. Attacking with 8th Inf Div, and CCR 5th AD, the V Corps managed to capture Huertgen after stiff fighting on 28 November 1944.

The attack started on 16 November. The two infantry regiments attacked in parallel columns: the 8th along the northern edge of the forest towards Düren, the 22nd further south in parallel. The open flanks invited infiltration. Similar tactics elsewhere in Hürtgen had "invited disaster".

Attacks by the 8th Infantry Regiment on Rother Weh Creek hit heavy resistance and were repulsed with heavy losses. The 22nd failed to take Raven's Hedge (Rabenheck), beaten back by heavy machine-gun and artillery fire along the fire-breaks. After three days, there were 300 casualties, including numerous officers and NCOs.

By 18 November, tanks were deemed essential, so engineers blasted tank routes through the forest. Communications and logistics remained a problem, so the next day the attack paused to allow re-supply and evacuation of the wounded. German reinforcements arrived from 344th and 353rd Infantry Divisions and resistance stiffened further.

Responsibility was returned to V Corps and, on 21 November, 8th Division attacked the Weisser Weh Valley, continuing toward Hürtgen. The 121st Infantry Regiment hit heavy defenses immediately. Despite armored support from the 10th Tank Battalion, daily advances were less than 600 yd (550 m). Hürtgen was taken on 29 November and the battle continued to Kleinhau, 1 mi (1.6 km) north.

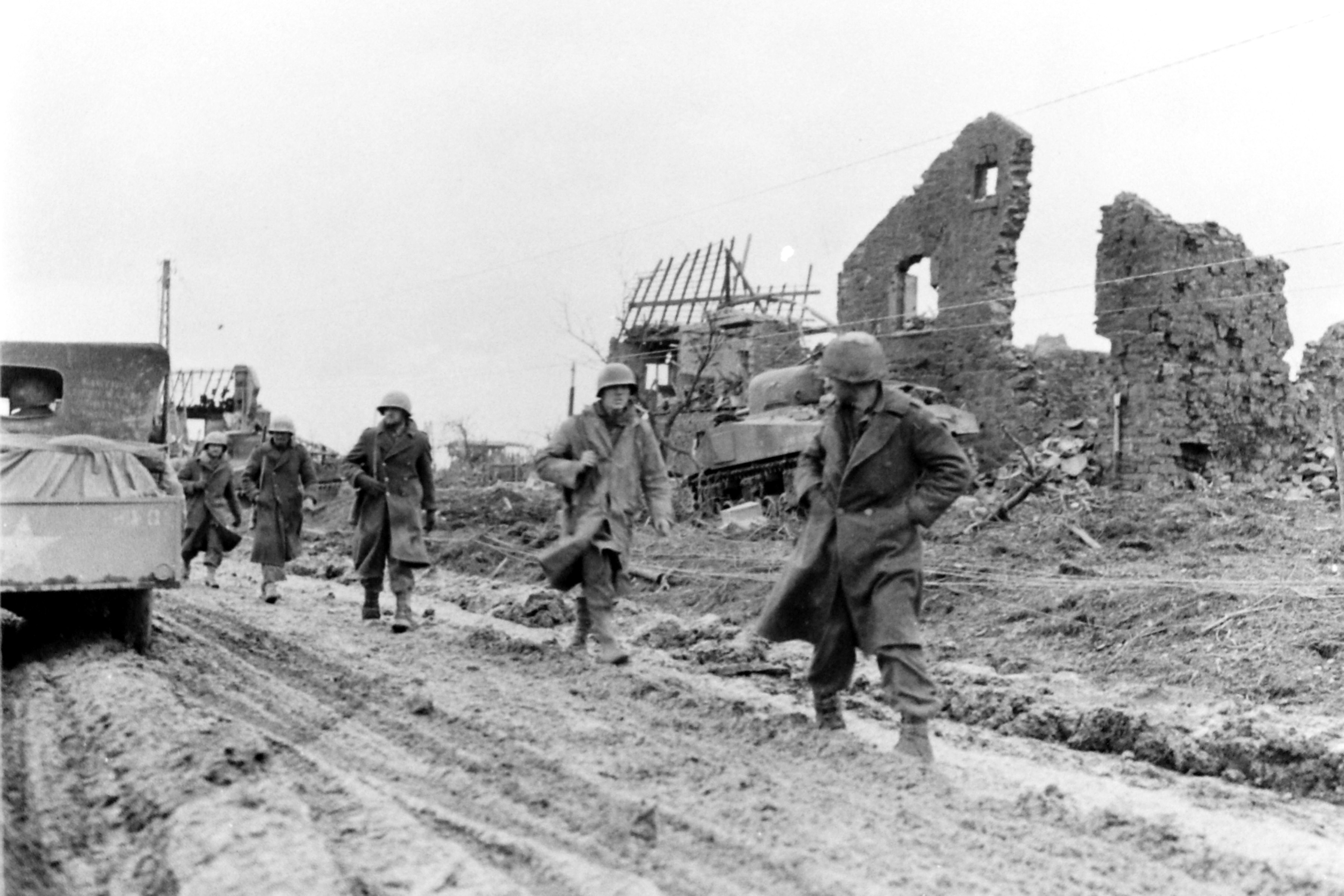
American infantrymen of the 121st Infantry Regiment, 8th Infantry Division move through the bombed out ruins of Hürtgen

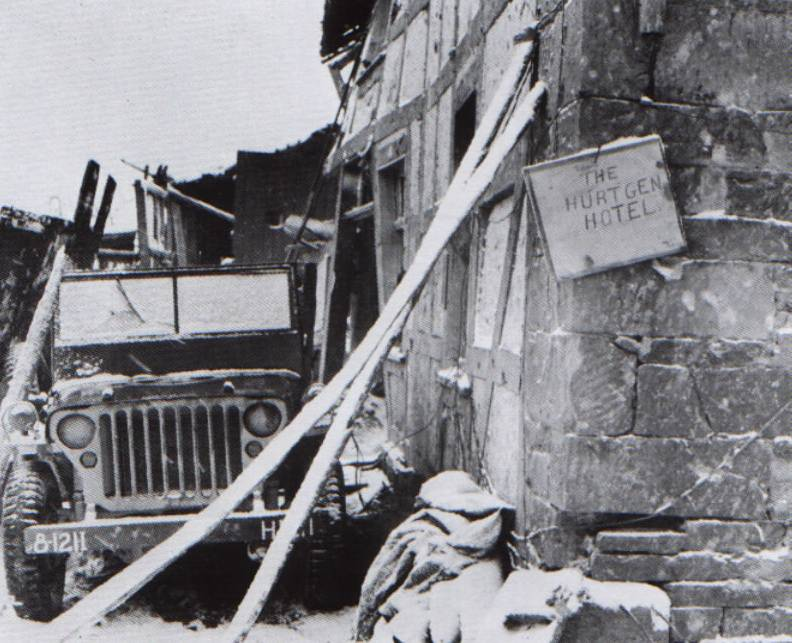
"Hürtgen Hotel", a farmhouse in Hürtgen that served as the shelter of HQ Company, 121st Infantry Regiment

The final action in the Hürtgen Forest was at Langerwehe-Merode, on the northeastern edge of the forest. Two American companies took the village, but they were later destroyed in a German counter-attack. More than 300 soldiers of the 1st Infantry Division were killed in action on November 29 and 30, 1944.

Later, the secret daily report of the Supreme High Command of the German Army (''Oberkommando des Heeres'' (OKH)) of 27 November, stated that in the old Langerwehe penetration area, the U.S. Army (enemy) won terrain.

Elements of the 8th and the 28th Infantry Divisions then advanced on Brandenberg. The 28th Division—just like the 9th before it (and the 4th Infantry Division, which would relieve the 28th)—also took heavy casualties during its stay in the Hürtgen Forest. On 14 November, the 2nd Ranger Battalion arrived to relieve elements of the 112th Infantry Regiment. On 6 December, the Rangers moved on Bergstein and subsequently took the strategic position of Hill 400 from defending troops from 980th Grenadier Regiment of the 272nd Volksgrenadier Division. Shortly thereafter, on 12 December, the towns of Gey and Strass were taken by American Forces. On the last day of the Hürtgen battle the Germans retook the hill from the 13th Regiment who had replaced the Rangers. The U.S. Army would not seize Hill 400 again until February 1945.

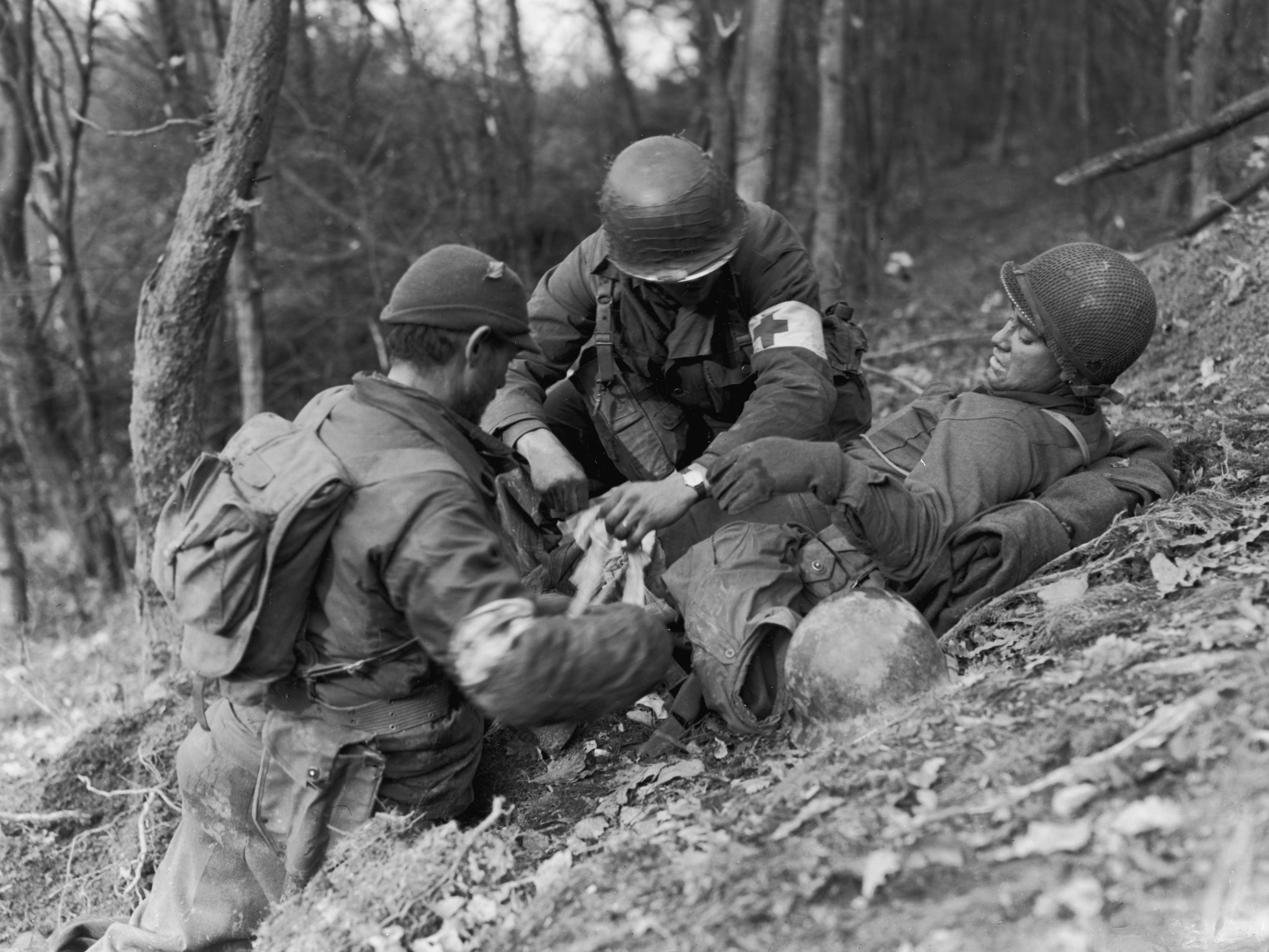
American medics bandaging a wounded soldier of the 4th Infantry Division, November 1944

From 1–12 December, the 309th, 310th and 311th Infantry Regiments of the 78th Infantry Division ("Lightning") relieved elements of the 1st Infantry Division in the line in the vicinity of Entenpfuhl. On 13 December, these regiments smashed into Simmerath, Witzerath, and Bikerath, Germany, and were fighting the Battle of Kesternich against the 272nd Volksgrenadier Division when General Gerd von Rundstedt launched his counteroffensive in the Monschau area. On December 15 the 2nd battalion, 309th Infantry was annihilated when the 272nd Volksgrenadiers counterattacked and took back Kesternich. The Germans knew that from the heights at Kesternich the Americans could detect the troop buildup for the Ardennes Offensive and place artillery there to fire on advancing German troops.

Military actions at the Siegfried Line up to 15 December alone brought death, injury or captivity to more than 250,000 soldiers from both sides. The First and Ninth U.S. Army suffered 57,039 battle casualties (dead, wounded, captured, missing in action); 71,654 non-battle casualties, i.e. accidents, diseases such as pneumonia, trench foot, frostbite, and trauma. German Armed Forces are presumed to be 12,000 dead, 95,000 captured (documented), and an unknown number of wounded.

On 16 December 1944, German forces began the Ardennes Offensive, more commonly known as the Battle of the Bulge and as a result further fighting in the Hürtgen ended.

== Aftermath ==
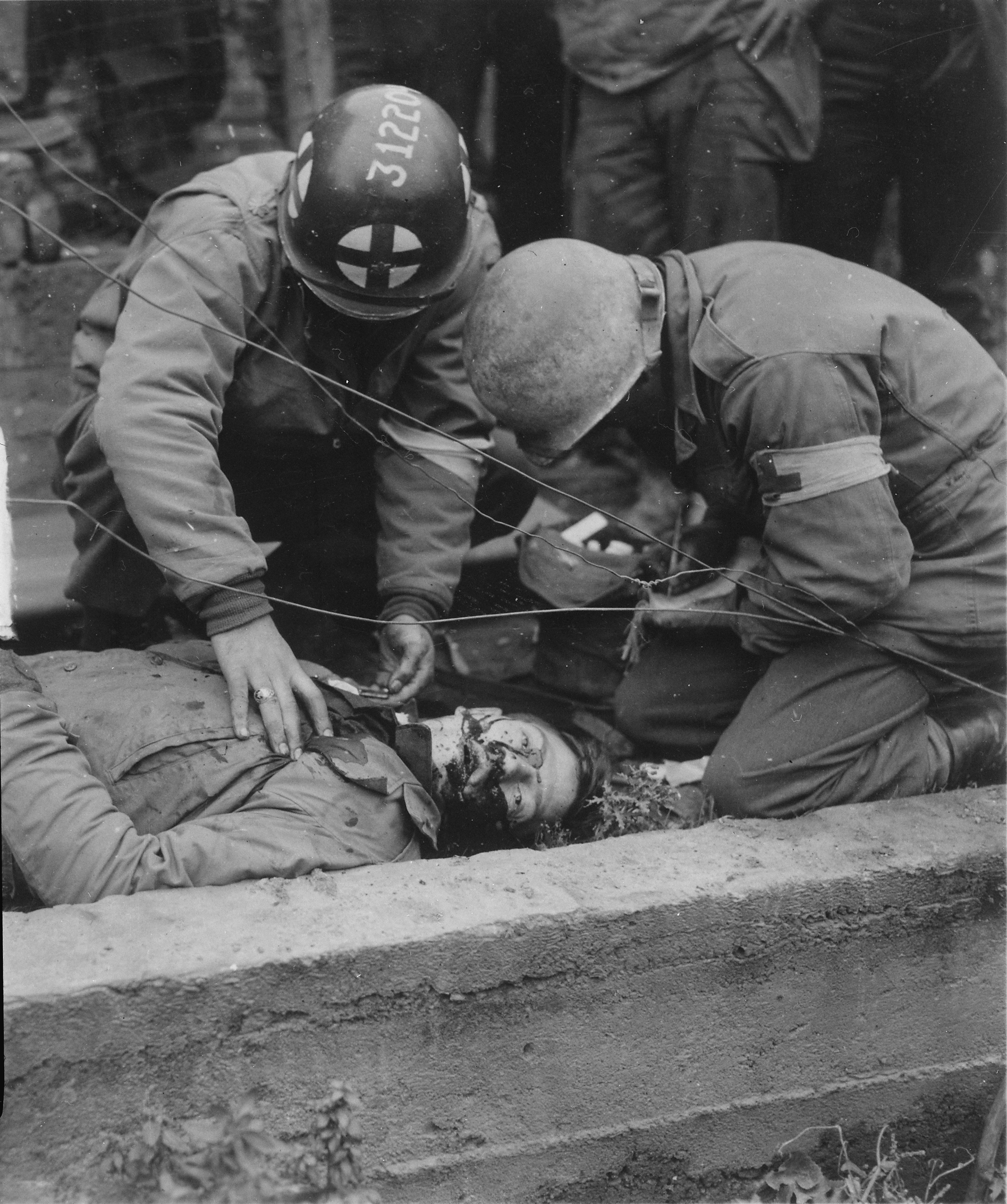
American medics tending to a soldier mortally wounded by German artillery near Schevenhütte, 22 December 1944

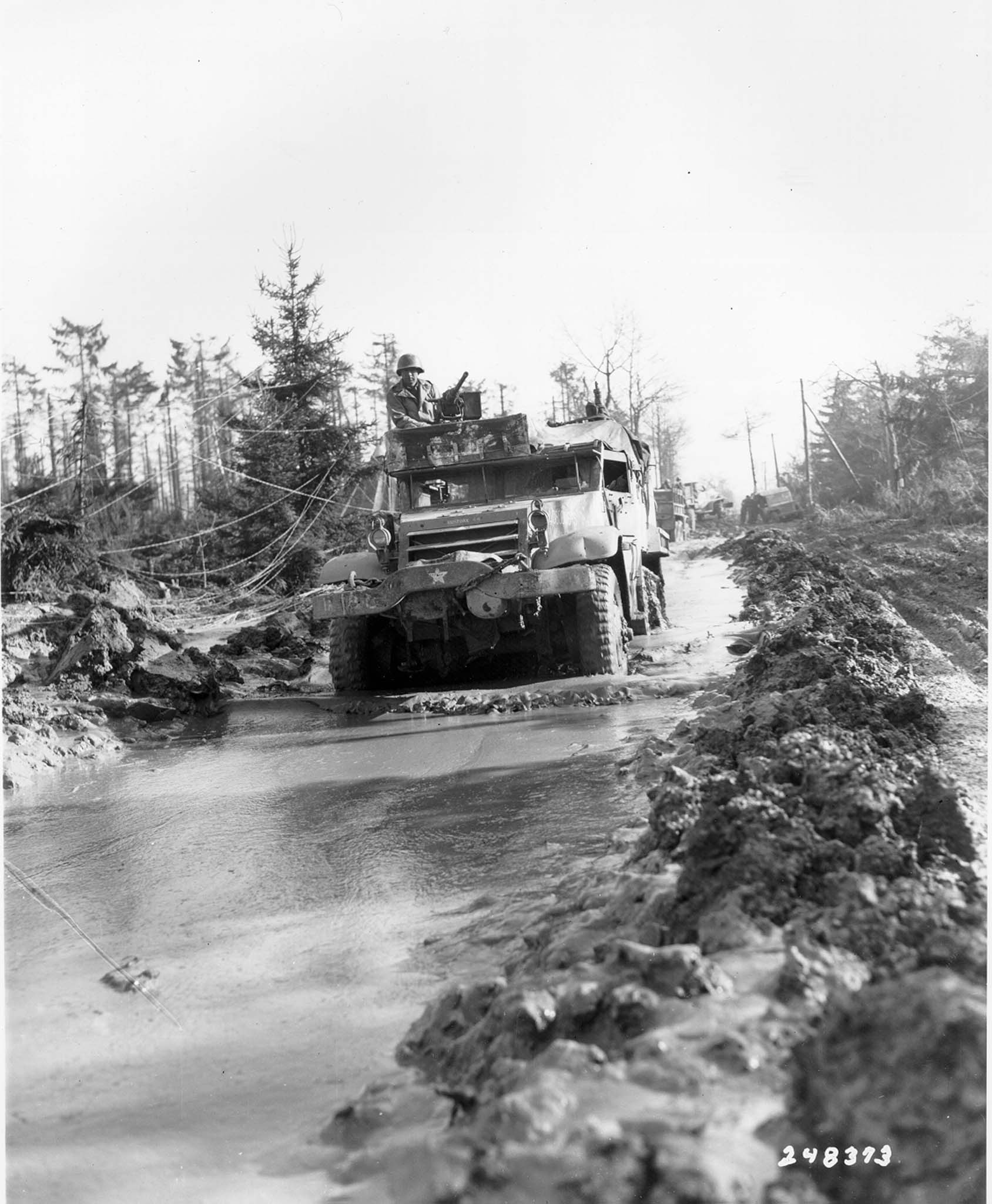
An M3 half-track of the 16th Infantry Regiment, 1st Infantry Division moving through a muddy road in the Hürtgen Forest, 15 February 1945

The battle of the Hürtgen ended in a German defensive victory and the whole offensive was a dismal failure for the Allies. The Americans suffered 33,000 casualties during the course of the battle which ranged up to 55,000 casualties, included 9,000 non-combat losses and represented a 25 percent casualty rate. The Germans had also suffered heavy losses with 28,000 casualties—many of these were non-combatants and prisoners of war.

The surprise German Ardennes offensive caught Allied forces off guard. The Germans attacked with nearly 30 divisions; including the elite 1st SS, 2nd SS, and the 12th SS Panzer Divisions, with the northernmost point of the battlefront centered on Monschau. They forced a large salient in the American lines almost sixty miles (100 km) deep at its maximum extent. However, the Germans never came close to their primary objective, the capture of Antwerp. The Ardennes Offensive came to a complete halt in early January, when German forces in the northern shoulder of the bulge were blocked by a strong American defence, the destruction of bridges by American engineers, and a lack of fuel.

In early February, American forces attacked through the Hürtgen Forest for the final time. On 10 February 1945, the Rur Dam was taken by American forces and the forest itself was not cleared until the 17th when the 82nd Airborne Division reached the Roer river.

== Historical analysis ==
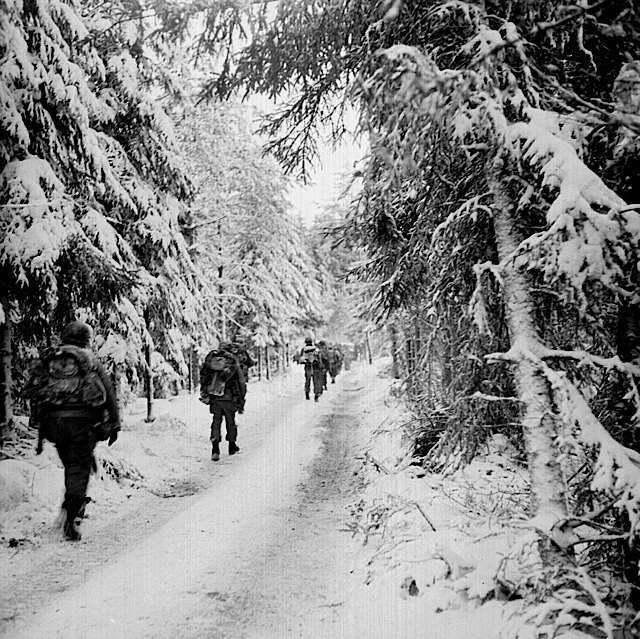
Men of the 517th Parachute Regimental Combat Team in the Hürtgen Forest, February 1945, during the final combat operations through the forest

Historical discussion revolves around whether or not the American battle plan made any operational or tactical sense. One analysis is that the Allies under-estimated the strength and determination remaining in the psyche of the German soldier, believing his fighting spirit had collapsed under the stress of the Normandy breakout and the reduction of the Falaise pocket.

Trigg describes the battle as one of the "most ill-conceived and unnecessary offensives of the whole northwest Europe campaign" and said that Hodges "lacked tactical imagination" and that "it was a miracle that he retained Eisenhower's confidence".

American commanders, in particular, misunderstood the impassability of the dense Hürtgen Forest, and its effects of reducing artillery effectiveness and making air or armoured support impracticable. The better alternative—breaking through south-east out into the open valley, where their advantages in mobility and airpower could come into play, and then heading northeast towards the actual objectives—seems not to have been really considered by the higher headquarters.

In addition, American forces were concentrated in the village of Schmidt, and neither tried to conquer the strategic Rur Dams nor recognized the importance of Hill 400 until an advanced stage of the battle.

World War Two lieutenant and History professor and academician Paul Fussell blames the impracticality of Hodges' command and untrained troops' demoralization for the defeat in the battle, citing the violation of Patton's observation that "Plans should be made by those who are going to execute them." (Note: Fussell, Paul. The Boys' Crusade: American G.I.s in Europe: chaos and fear in World War Two. Pages 85-86. 2004. Retrieved on 22 Sept. 2023."'Officially,' the American in charge of all this was Lieutenant General Courtney H. Hodges, commander of First Army. He was running the battle from Spa, in Belgium, thirty miles away. At his best he must have been calm and impressive, but, as a military thinker, he was, says one historian, a 'most conservative tactician, forever worried about his flanks.' Having commanded a machine-gun company in the earlier world war and having experienced the Argonne, he might have been familiar with the special problem of fighting in a forest, where the troops cannot see the signals of the leader. On his visits to the line, he didn't often get farther forward than a division headquarters, and he was thus out of contact with the troops who had to obey his orders. He was innocently violating one of General Patton's wise observations: 'Plans should be made by those who are going to execute them.' Hodges had not exactly lost touch with his soldiers, but he seemed not to realize that he was commanding not professional troops but terribly scared boy draftees. Hodges brought to the battle a bundle of conventional approaches, while the battle demanded nothing but the unconventional. His corps commanders kept sending into the Hürtgen area division after division to replace those that had failed. The 28th Division was one of the first assigned to this hell. It failed, like the 9th Division it relieved. Next was the 8th Division, so badly mauled that it too had to be withdrawn, to be relieved by the 1st Division. Beaten up in turn, it yielded the job to the 4th Division. Then the 83rd Division. Then the 5th Armored. More than a quarter of all these troops became casualties, and what shell fragments, bullets, grenades, mines, and trench foot didn't take care of, diarrhea did. These varied troops were brave enough and willing enough, but their experience in the forest was so awful that it produced a whole parade of 'unmanly' behaviors: unordered flight and even rout; flagrant disobedience; bursting into tears; faking illnesses; and self-inflicted wounds. Here is radioman George Barrette's reaction to his first artillery barrage: 'Me and this buddy of mine were in the same hole with only a little brush on top, and I remember I was actually bawling. We were both praying to the Lord over and over again to please stop the barrage, shaking and shivering and crying and praying all at the same time.' One cause of troop weakness was training failure: despite Lesley McNair's efforts, apparently no one had thought very hard about tactics to be used in heavy woods and defensive measures to be taken in such a setting. Apparently no officer or noncom had ever lectured on tree bursts, and there were few other kinds in a forest. (A tree burst is a shell burst not at ground level but up in the air. At ground level, a foxhole or trench will offer some protection, for the shell fragments come horizontally. But a tree burst delivers the fragments downward, and the only protection is to hug a tree.) One of Patton's maxims was, 'Do not dig slit trenches under trees, if you can avoid it.' Yes, but where else in this thick, dark forest could you find protection from shells bursting everywhere?)

== Memorials ==
There is a stone monument with a bronze plaque at the Hürtgen Military Cemetery, dedicated by veterans of the U.S. 4th Infantry Division to the memory of Friedrich Lengfeld (29 September 1921 – 12 November 1944), a German lieutenant. Lengfeld died on 12 November 1944, of severe wounds sustained while helping a wounded American soldier out of the "Wild Sow" ("Wilde Sau") minefield. It is the only such memorial for a German soldier placed by his erstwhile opponents in a German military cemetery.

A memorial sculpture on Kall Bridge recalls that moment of humanity amidst the horrors of war. It was officially dedicated on the 60th anniversary of the ceasefire on the Kall Bridge, November 7, 2004. It was created by Michael Pohlmann, who commented:

I didn't want to create a monument to heroes, no theatrical representation, no pathos, but wanted to appear more unassumingly with a frugal shape, hewn in stone, dignifying the actual place of the incident. A place perhaps, at which once everything may have started rationally, then however, became more and more irrational and totally out of control until a return to sanity—or was it still emotion?—made a humanitarian encounter come true.

The plaque was created by the sculptor Tilman Schmitten, Eupen. The memorial sculpture and plaque were endowed by the Konejung Foundation: Culture

The 1944 Hürtgen Forest Museum was opened on 29 March 1983 in Kleinhau, in a stone barn to commemorate the battle.

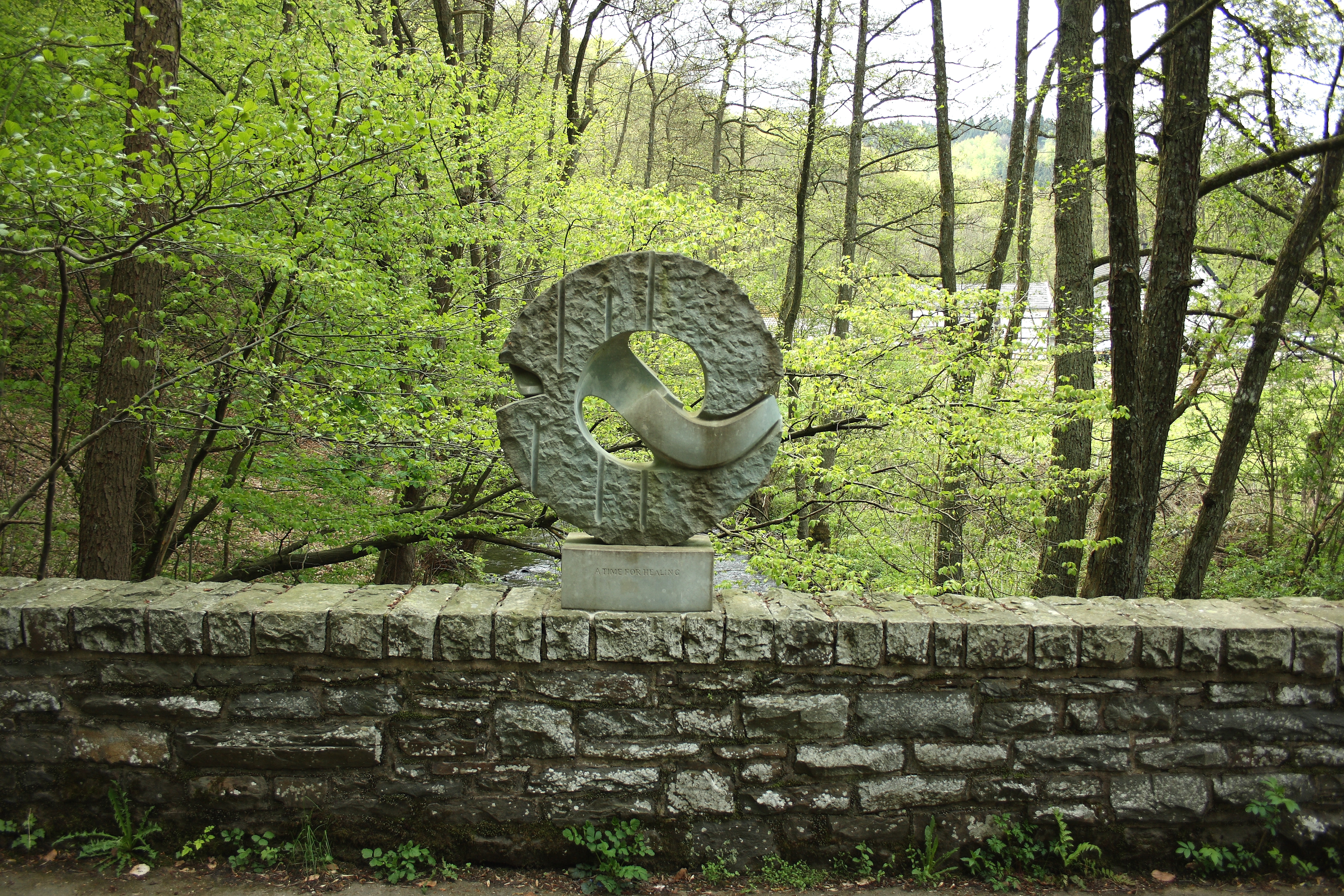
"A Time For Healing" sculpture on the Kall Bridge

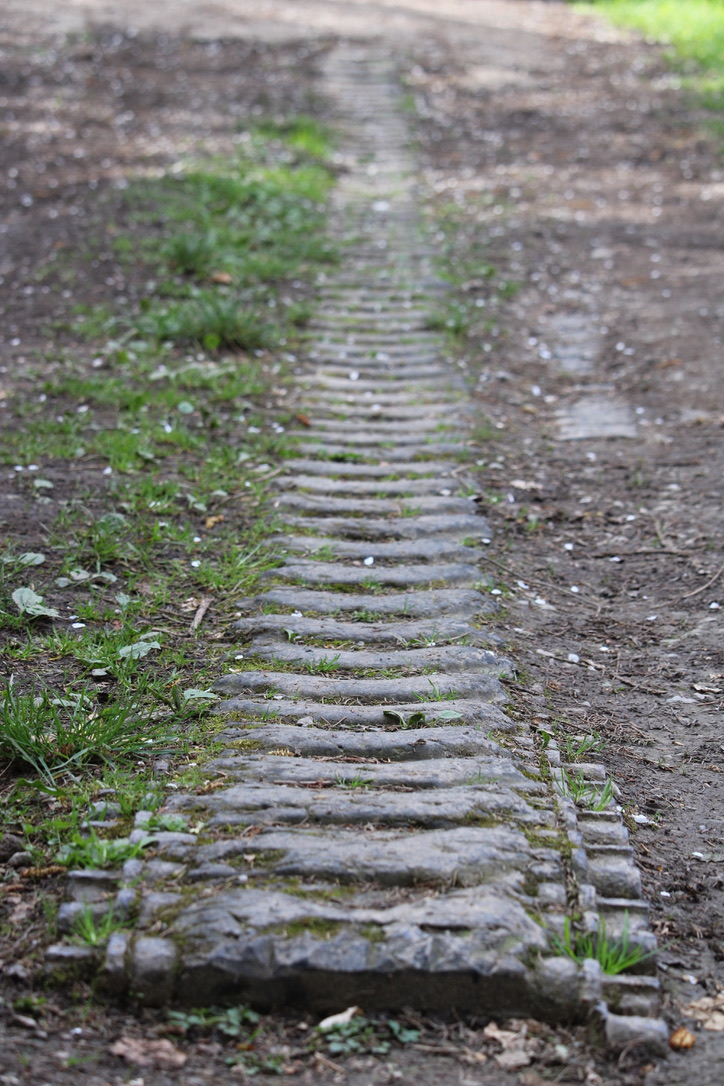
The track of an American vehicle still embedded in the Kall Trail

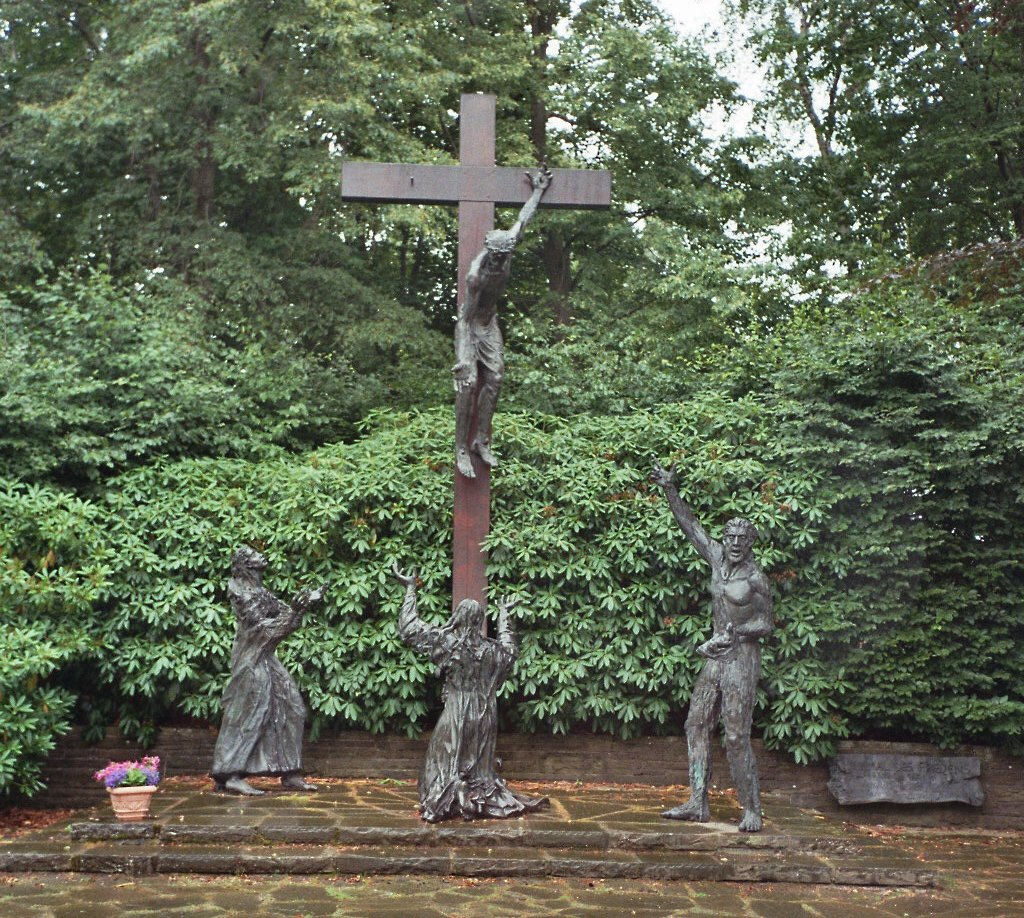
A memorial in Vossenack dedicated to the battle by Father Laurentius Englisch

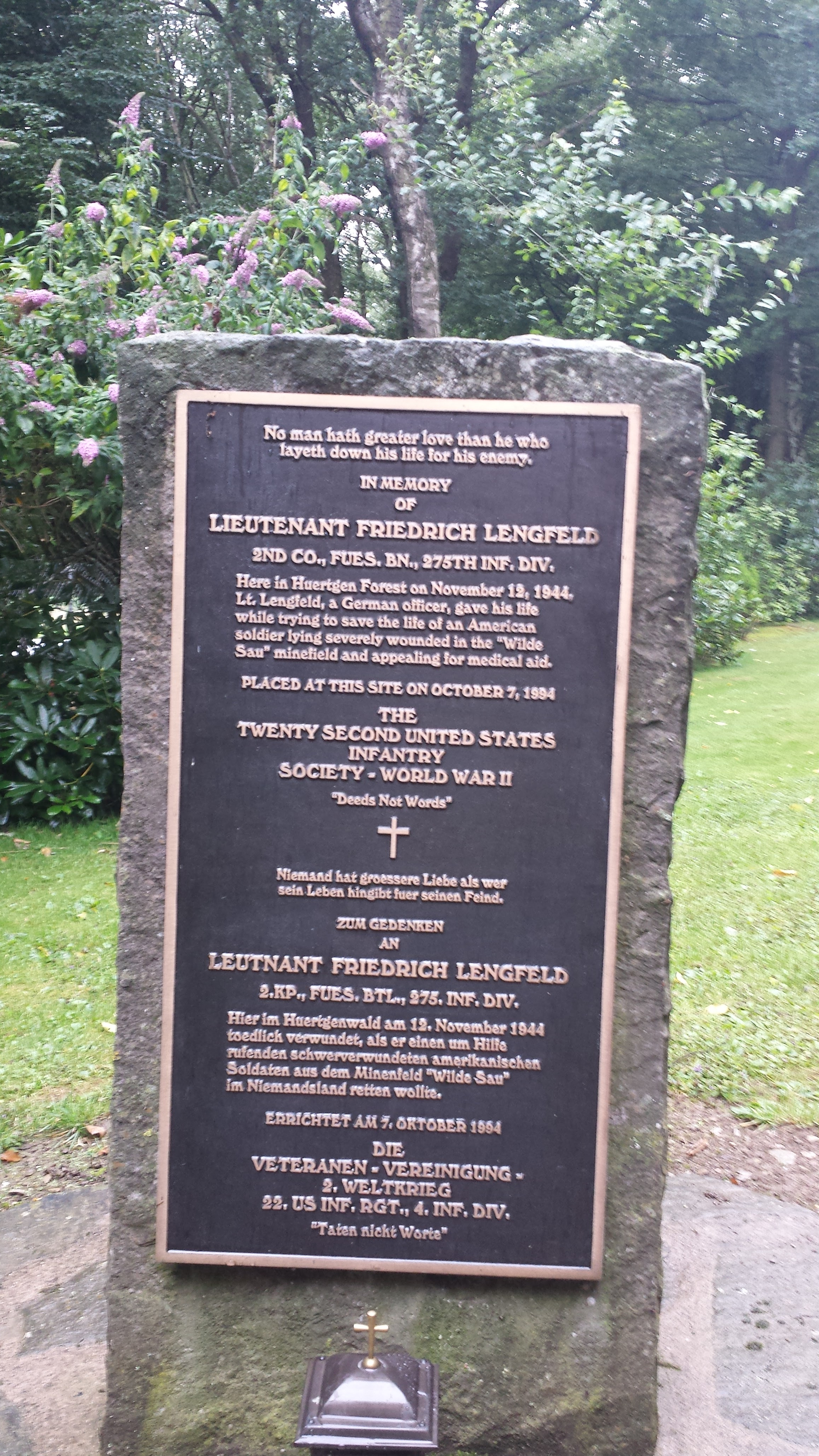
A marker in the Germany Military Cemetery honoring Lieutenant Lengfeld

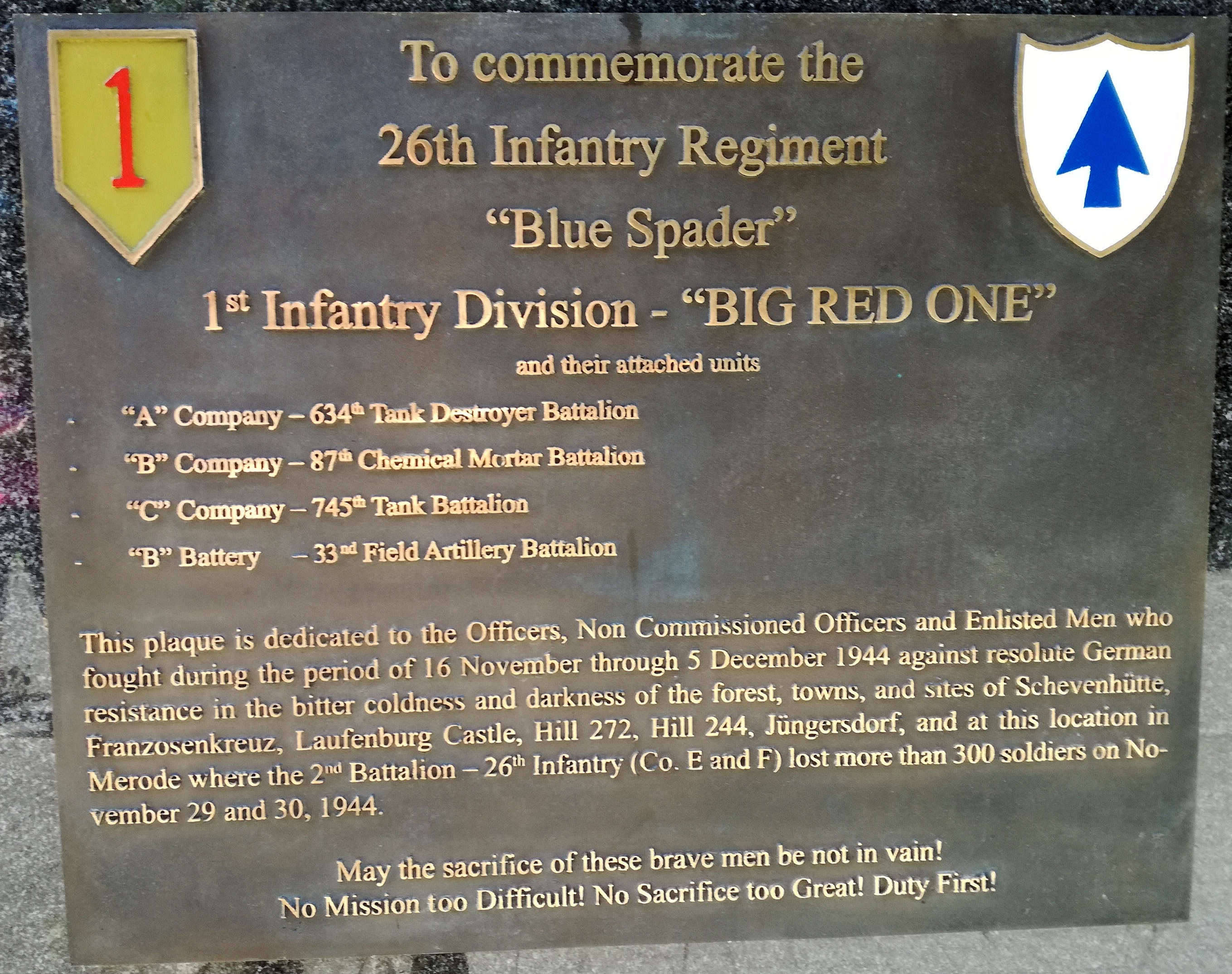
Commemorative plaque at a house in Merode remembering the soldiers of the 1st Infantry Division lost in action at the Merode area 1944

== See also ==
- Battle of Crucifix Hill
- When Trumpets Fade, a 1998 HBO film which depicts the battle
- Assault on Hill 400, a 2023 film with William Baldwin and Michael Madsen (Assault on Hill 400 at IMDb)

== Bibliography ==
- Andrews, Ernest A.; Hurt, David B. (2022). A Machine Gunner's War: From Normandy to Victory with the 1st Infantry Division in World War II. Philadelphia & Oxford: Casemate. ISBN 978-1636241043.
- Astor, Gerald. The Bloody Forest: Battle for Huertgen September 1944 – January 1945. Presidio Press, 2000. ISBN 0891416994 OCLC 43810800
- Atkinson, Rick (2013). The Guns at Last Light. New York: Henry Holt and Company. ISBN 978-0-8050-6290-8.
- Beevor, Antony (2015). Ardennes 1944: Hitler's Last Gamble. Viking. ISBN 978-0-670-91864-5.
- Bergström, Christer [in Swedish] (2014). The Ardennes, 1944–1945 Hitler's Winter Offensive. Casemate / Vaktel Forlag. ISBN 978-1612002774.
- Cole, Hugh M. (1965). The Ardennes: Battle of the Bulge. Washington, D.C.: Office of the Chief of Military History Department of the Army. LCCN 65-60001.
- Currey, Cecil B. (1984). Follow Me and Die: The Destruction of an American Division in World War II. New York: Stein & Day.
- Fabianek, Paul (2012). Folgen der Säkularisierung für die Klöster im Rheinland – Am Beispiel der Klöster Schwarzenbroich und Kornelimünster. Aachen: BoD. ISBN 978-3-8482-1795-3.
- MacDonald, Charles B. (1984) [1963]. The Siegfried Line campaign. Center of Military History, United States Army. OCLC 1351714.
- MacDonald, Charles B., and Sidney T. Mathews, Three battles: Arneville, Altuzzo, and Schmidt. Center of Military History, United States Army, 1993. Previously published in 1952. OCLC 1350067
- MacLean, French L. (2024), Dying Hard: Company B, 39th Infantry Regiment, 9th Infantry Division in World War II, Schiffer Military History, ISBN 978-0-7643-6829-5
- Miller, Edward (1995). A Dark and Bloody Ground: The Hürtgen Forest and the Roer River Dams, 1944–1945. College Station, TX: Texas: A & M University Press. ISBN 1585442585.
- Miller, Robert A. (1989). Division commander : a biography of Major General Norman D. Cota. Spartanburg, S.C.: Reprint Company, Publishers. ISBN 0-87152-438-4. OCLC 20218839.
- "His Dad, The WWII Soldier, Is Resting in Flanders Fields". Mobile Register. Mobile, AL. 16 October 2004. p. 19. Archived from the original on 6 October 2018. (An article by the son of an American soldier who died in the Battle of the Hürtgen Forest.)
- Nash, Douglas (2008). Victory was Beyond Their Grasp: With the 272nd Volks-Grenadier Division from the Hürtgen Forest to the Heart of the Reich. Bedford: The Aberjona Press. Archived from the original on 9 February 2008.
- Neillands, Robin (2005). The Battle for the Rhine 1945. London: Orion Publishing Group. ISBN 0-297-84617-5.
- Owens, Emiel W. (2006). Blood on German Snow: An African American Artilleryman in World War II and Beyond. Texas A&M University Press. p. 58. ISBN 978-1585445370.
- Regan, Geoffrey (1993). The Guinness book of more military blunders. Carlton Books. ISBN 978-0-85112-728-6.
- Rush, Robert Sterling, Hell in Hürtgen Forest: The Ordeal and Triumph of an American Infantry Regiment. University Press of Kansas, Lawrence, KS (2001) ISBN 0700611282 OCLC 47081237
- Thomas, Peter (15 December 2008). "We owe our freedom to GIs who fought". Naples News. Archived from the original on 18 December 2008.
- Trigg, Jonathan (2020). To VE-Day through German Eyes: The Final Defeat of Nazi Germany. Stroud UK: Amberley. ISBN 978-1-4456-9944-8.
- Whiting, Charles (1976). Bloody Aachen. New York: Stein and Day. ISBN 978-0-88029-229-0. OCLC 2188959.
- Whiting, Charles (1989). The Battle of Hürtgen Forest. New York: Orion Books. ISBN 978-0-671-68636-9. OCLC 22443408.
- Wilson, George, If you survive. New York, Ballantine Books, 1987 ISBN 978-0804100038 Eyewitness account 4th Infantry Division
- Zabecki, David T, ed. (2015). World War II in Europe: An Encyclopedia Military History of the United States. Routledge. ISBN 978-1135812492.
- Zaloga, Steven J (2007). Siegfried Line 1944–45: Battles on the German frontier. Osprey Publishing Ltd. ISBN 978-1-84603-121-2.

=== Attribution ===
- This article incorporates public domain material from Lieutenant Colonel (ret) Thomas G. Bradbeer. Major General Cota and the Battle of the Huertgen Forest: A Failure of Battle Command?
