= Hürtgen Forest =

Forest along the border between Belgium and Germany

Hürtgen forest German: Hürtgenwald
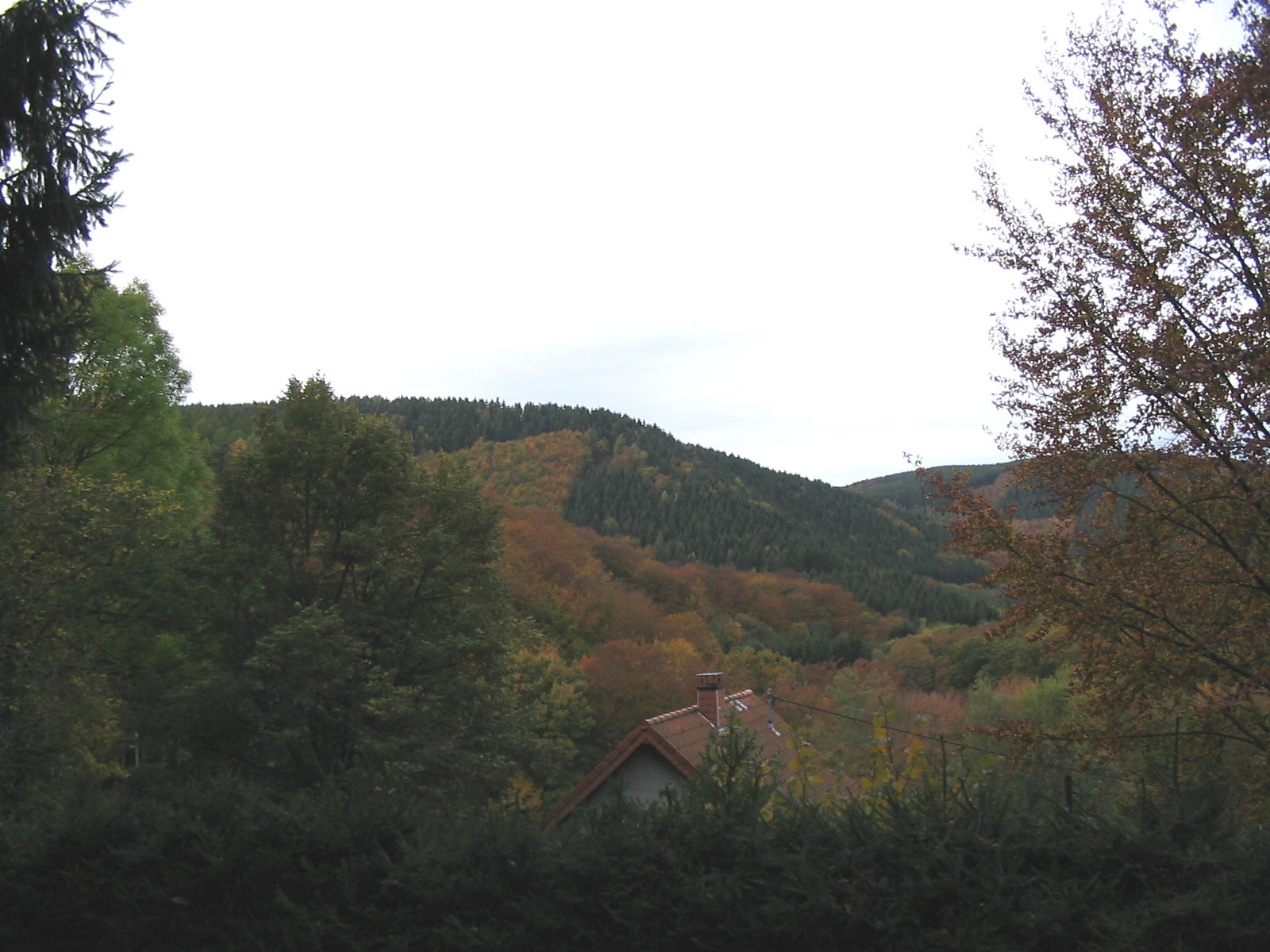
- View looking west over the Kall Valley in the Hürtgen Forest

- Location within North Rhine-Westphalia Location within Germany

Geography
- Coordinates: 50.7008°N 6.4284°E

The Hürtgen forest (also: Huertgen Forest; German: Hürtgenwald [ˈhʏʁtɡn̩ˌvalt]) is located along the border between Belgium and Germany, in the southwest corner of the German federal state of North Rhine-Westphalia. The forest lies within a triangle outlined by the German towns of Aachen, Monschau, and Düren, covering 130 square kilometres (50 square miles) in area. The Rur River runs along the forest's eastern edge.

== History ==
Before World War II, the Hürtgen Forest was a dense, rugged woodland, spanning about 50 square kilometers, mostly used for timber production. The area was sparsely populated with small villages and had limited strategic importance.

Between the 13th and 21st of August 2026, the largest wildfire in North-Rhine Westphalia since records raged in the Hürtgen Forest. Between 300 and 400 hectares (740 - 990 acres) were destroyed. At its peak, 1,800 personnel from numerous fire brigades, the Bundeswehr, Federal and State Police, the Technisches Hilfswerk, the State Forest Authority of North Rhine-Westphalia (Landesbetrieb Wald und Holz NRW), numerous other aid organizations and local farmers fought against the fire. At times, of four military engineering vehicles, 10 helicopters and the EU wildfire fighting module GFFFV-DE1 were deployed. Due to the Battle of the Hürtgen Forest, the area is to this day contaminated with munitions, which complicated the fire-fighting operations. 1800 people from the town Gey in the municipality of Hürtgenwald had to be evacuated.

== Geography ==
The Hürtgen Forest lies at the northern edge of the Eifel mountains and High Fens – Eifel Nature Park. Its terrain is characterized by plunging valleys that carve through broad plateaus, with hilltop plateaus that have been cleared for agriculture.

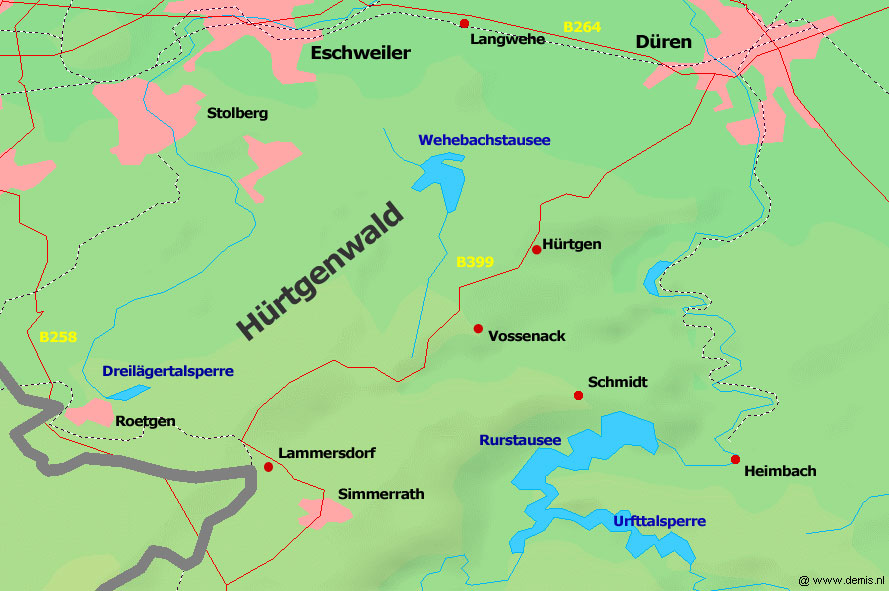
Map of the Huertgen Forest (Hürtgenwald)

== Battle of Hürtgen Forest ==
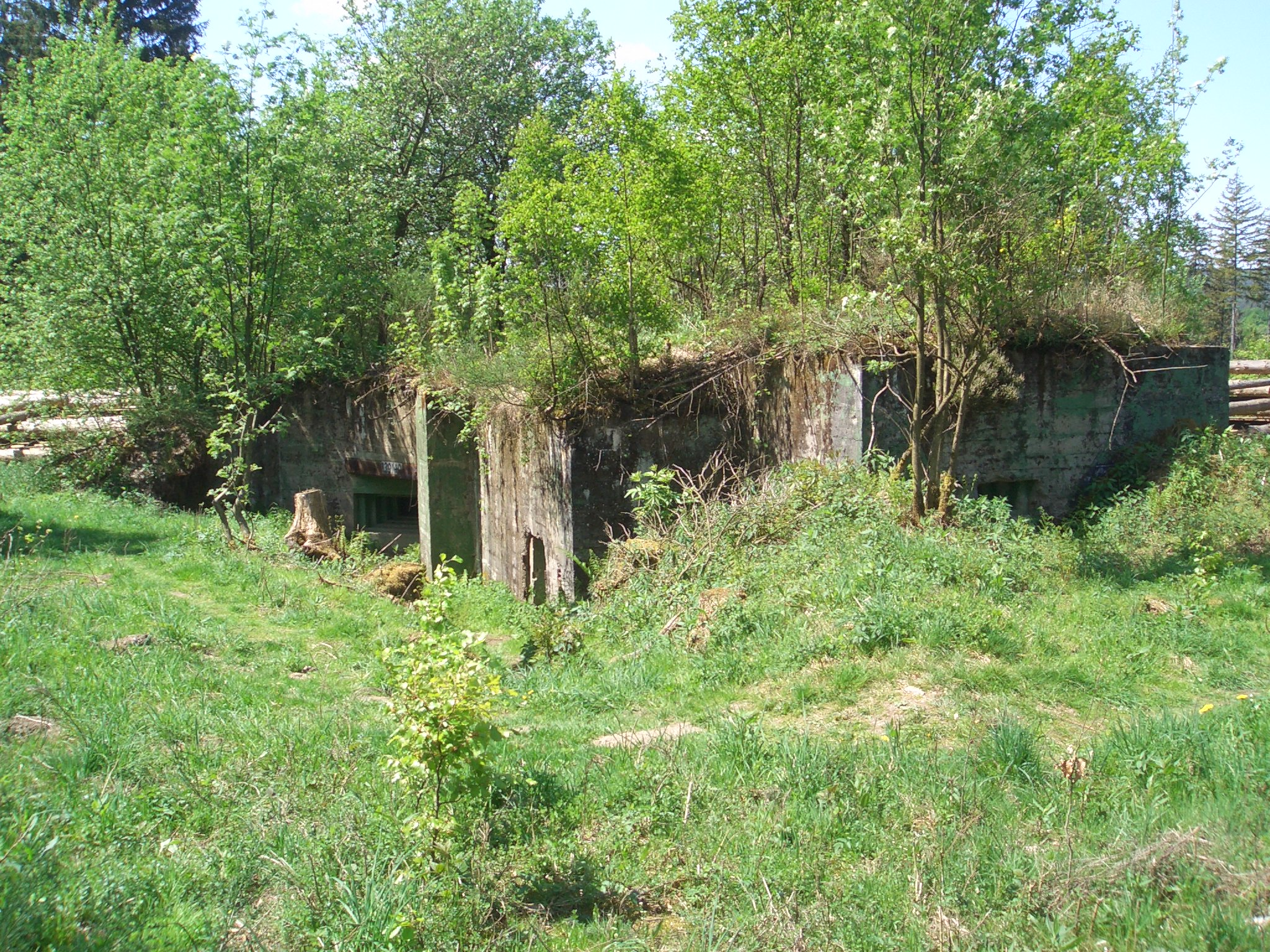
Siegfried Line bunker in the northern Eifel.

During World War II, the rugged terrain of this area was the scene of the long, bloody, drawn-out Battle of Hürtgen Forest, which took place over three months during a cold fall from 19 September 1944 to 16 December 1944. The Germans successfully defended the area while gaining time to launch a surprise counter offensive in the Ardennes on 16 December 1944, the Battle of the Bulge.

The forest was further devastated by fires in the summer of 1945, ignited as the weather warmed leftover white phosphorus munitions.

The battle is commemorated in the 1944 Hürtgen Forest Museum, opened in 1983. There are three German war cemeteries; the one at Hürtgen was opened in 1952 and is the resting place of some one hundred postwar victims of mines and unexploded ordnance. Beside other small memorials, the road that rises from the Kall River Valley to the town of Schmidt incorporated the track of a destroyed Sherman tank.
