= Invasion of Germany =

Germany and Germanic lands have been invaded by foreign powers several times. Invasion of Germany may refer to the following:

- Various invasions of Germania by the Roman Empire.
  - Roman campaigns in Germania (12 BC – AD 16)
  - Marcomannic Wars
  - Battle at the Harzhorn
  - Constantine the Great's German campaign
- Invasion of Germania by the Huns in 375.
- Various invasions of the Holy Roman Empire and other German states between 1618 and 1648 during the Thirty Years War.
- Invasion of the Margraviate of Brandenburg by the Swedish Empire during the Scanian War.
- Austrian and Russian invasions of Prussia during the Third Silesian War (part of the Seven Years' War).
  - 1757 raid on Berlin
  - 1760 raid on Berlin
- French invasion of Prussia during the Napoleonic Wars in 1806.
- Plan XVII, the French plan that was put into effect in 1914 at the outbreak of World War I
- Invasion of Nazi Germany, in 1945, by the Allies during World War II.
  - The Saar Offensive, a failed invasion of the Saarland by France during the Phoney War
  - The Siegfried Line campaign
    - Operation Clipper
    - Battle of Aachen
    - Battle of the Hurtgen Forest
    - Battle of Crucifix Hill
    - Battle of Fort Driant
  - The Western Allied invasion of Germany
    - Rhineland Offensive
    - Operation Veritable
    - Operation Grenade
    - Operation Plunder
    - Operation Varsity
    - Battle of Cologne
    - Battle of the Ruhr Pocket
    - Battle of Remagen
    - Battle of Heilbronn
    - Battle of Frankfurt
    - Battle of Nuremberg
    - Battle of Hamburg
  - The Soviet Union invasion of Germany
    - Vistula-Oder Offensive
    - East Prussian Offensive
    - East Pomeranian Offensive
    - Vienna Offensive
    - Silesian Offensives
    - Battle of Seelow Heights
    - Battle of Berlin
