= Battle of Aachen =

Battle on the Western Front of World War II

- Part of the Allied advance from Paris to the Rhine during the Western Front of World War II
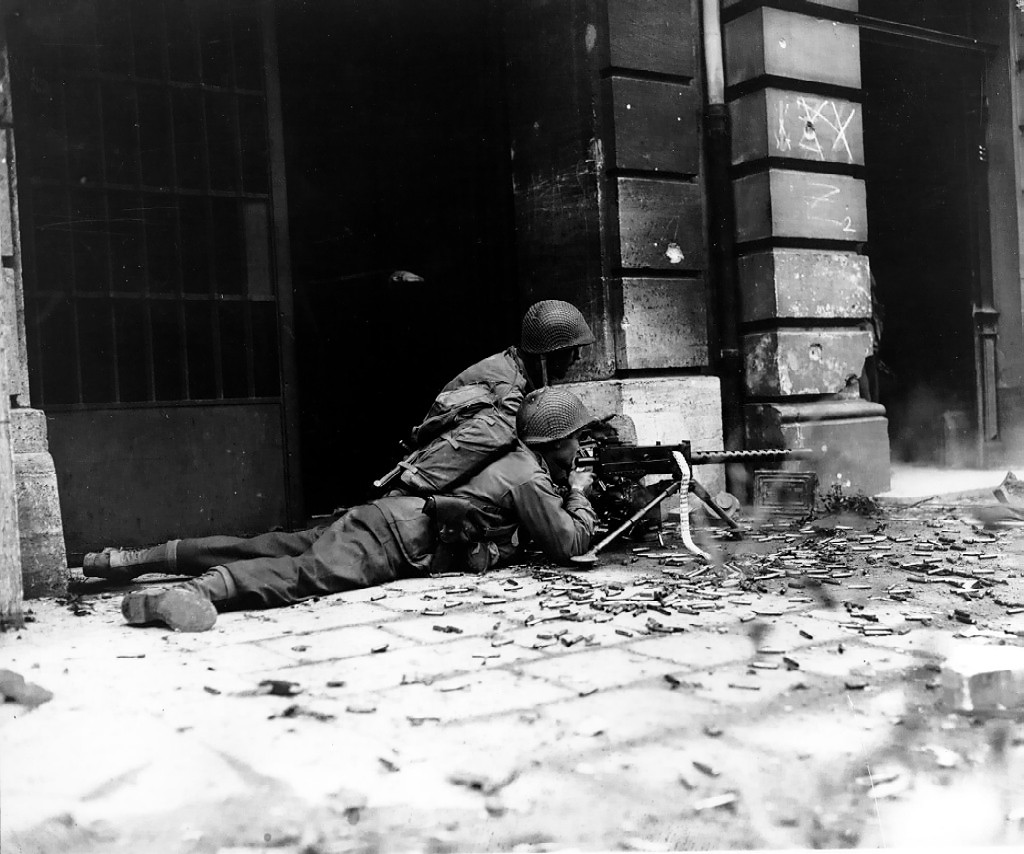
- American M1919 machine gun crew in action against German defenders in the streets of Aachen on 15 October 1944
Date	12 September – 21 October 1944 (1 month, 1 week and 2 days)
Location	Aachen, Germany 50°46′35″N 06°05′00″E
Result	American victory

Belligerents
United States	Germany

Commanders and leaders
(United States) Courtney Hodges; (United States) Clarence R. Huebner; (United States) Leland S. Hobbs	(Nazi Germany) Gerd von Rundstedt (Note: Overall commander); (Nazi Germany) Walter Model; (Nazi Germany) Friedrich Köchling; (Nazi Germany) Gerhard von Schwerin (Note: Replaced); (Nazi Germany) Gerhard Wilck

Units involved
(United States) First Army: 1st Infantry Division; 9th Infantry Division; 29th Infantry Division; 30th Infantry Division; 2nd Armored division; 3rd Armored division; 28th Infantry Division	(Nazi Germany) LXXXI Army Corps: 116th Panzer Division; 183rd Volksgrenadier Division; 246th Volksgrenadier Division; 12th Volksgrenadier Division; 49th Infantry Division

Strength
119,000 soldiers	32,000 soldiers 5,000 Volkssturm

Casualties and losses
7,000+ casualties including 2,000 killed	5,000 casualties (estimate), 5,600 captured

The Battle of Aachen was a battle of World War II, fought by American and German forces in and around Aachen, Germany, between 12 September and 21 October 1944. The city had been incorporated into the Siegfried Line, the main defensive network on Germany's western border; the Allies had hoped to capture it quickly and advance into the industrialized Ruhr basin. Although most of Aachen's civilian population was evacuated before the battle began, much of the city was destroyed and both sides suffered heavy losses during the battle.

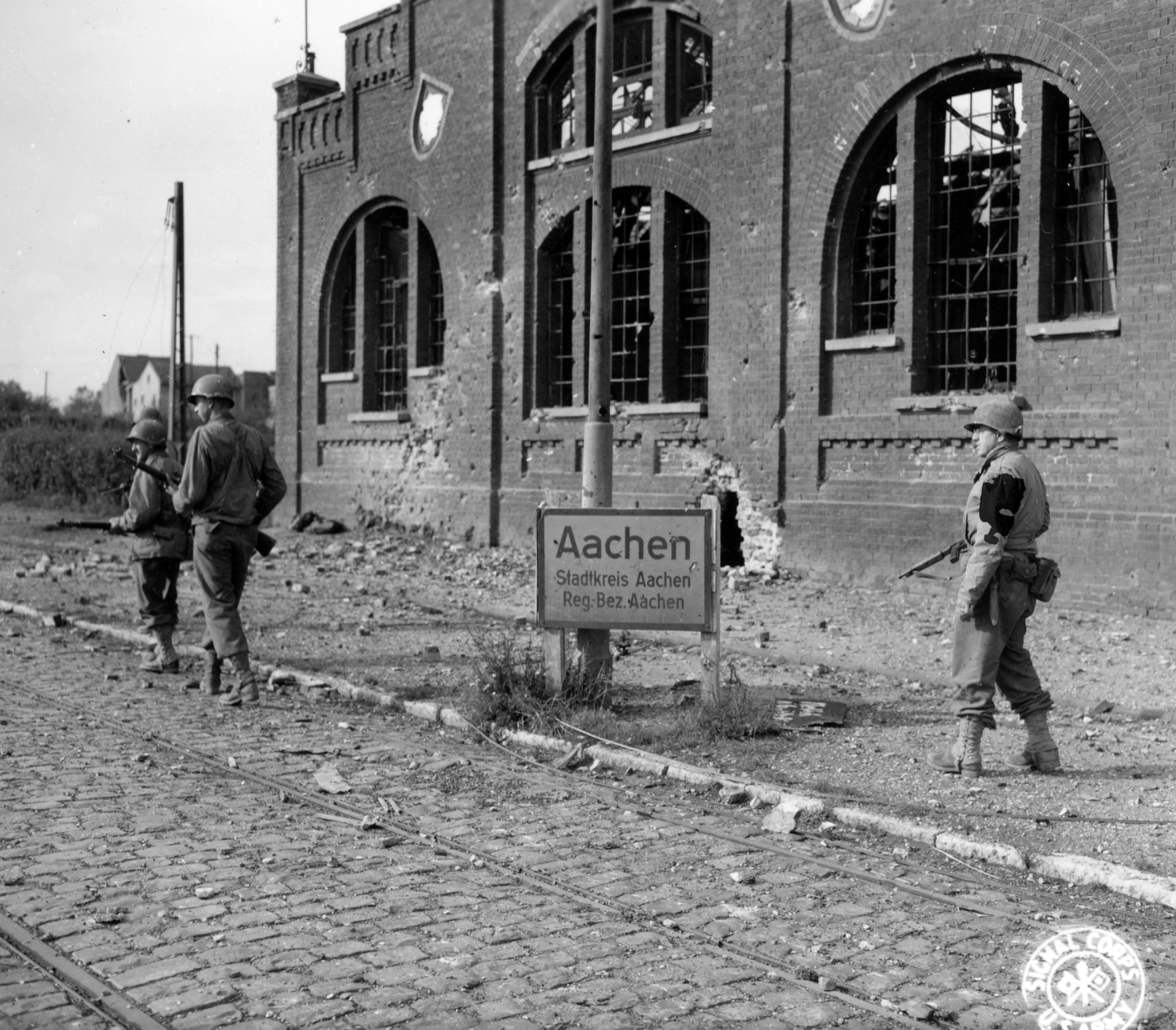
Soldiers of the U.S. 1st Infantry Division beside the "Aachen" road sign.

It was one of the largest urban battles fought by U.S. forces in World War II, and is considered one of the toughest urban encounters in the entire war. As a result, Aachen became the first city on internationally recognized German soil to be captured by the Allies. (Note: Several non-internationally-recognized cities in German annexed territory in the East had already been liberated earlier that year during Operation Bagration.) Despite their eventual surrender, German defence of the city was robust and significantly disrupted Allied plans for further advance into the country.

== Background ==
Since May 1940, Aachen had been under constant bombing from the Royal Air Force. An indication of what was to come was the raid of 23/24 May 1940 with over 120 bombers. Several raids were witnessed by the famous American war correspondent William Shirer. After increasing tonnages of high explosive bombs, Aachen became one of the first German cities to receive a fire-raid on 12/13 July 1943. The fires destroyed the heart of the old Baroque centre. Subsequent raids in 1944, in particular 11 April and 24-27 May, effectively ‘paralysed’ the City.

By September 1944, the Western Allies had reached Germany's western border, which was protected by the extensive Siegfried Line. On 17 September, British, American, and Polish forces launched Operation Market Garden, an ambitious attempt to bypass the Siegfried Line by crossing the Lower Rhine River in the Netherlands. The failure of this operation, and an acute supply problem brought about by the long distances involved in the rapid drive through France, brought an end to the headlong Allied race toward Berlin. German casualties in France had been high – Field Marshal Walter Model estimated that his 74 divisions had the actual strength of just 25 – but the Western Allies' logistical problems gave the Germans a respite, which they used to begin rebuilding their strength. In September, the Wehrmacht high command's reinforcement of the Siegfried Line brought total troop strength up to an estimated 230,000 soldiers, including 100,000 fresh personnel. At the start of the month, the Germans had had about 100 tanks in the West; by the end, they had roughly 500. As men and equipment continued to flow into the Siegfried Line they were able to establish an average defensive depth of 3.0 mi (4.8 km).

Supreme Headquarters Allied Expeditionary Force (SHAEF), under the command of General Dwight D. Eisenhower, set their sights on the occupation of the Ruhr, Germany's industrial heartland. General George S. Patton's Third Army was given the task of occupying the French region of Lorraine, while General Courtney Hodges's First Army was ordered to break through the front near Aachen. Hodges had initially hoped to bypass the city itself, believing it to be held only by a small garrison, which would presumably surrender once isolated.

The ancient, picturesque city of Aachen had little military value in itself, as it was not a major center of war production. Its population of around 165,000 had not been subject to heavy bombing by the Allies. It was, however, an important symbol to both the Nazi regime and the German people; not only was it the first German city threatened by an enemy during World War II, it was also the historic capital of Charlemagne, founder of the Holy Roman Empire. Historical propaganda produced under Nazi Germany had portrayed Charlemagne as the founder of Germany's "first" empire and whose legacy the Nazis claimed; as such, it was of immense psychological value. The mindset of the city's defenders was further altered by the different attitude the local population had toward them as they fought on home soil for the first time; one German officer commented, "Suddenly we were no longer the Nazis, we were German soldiers."

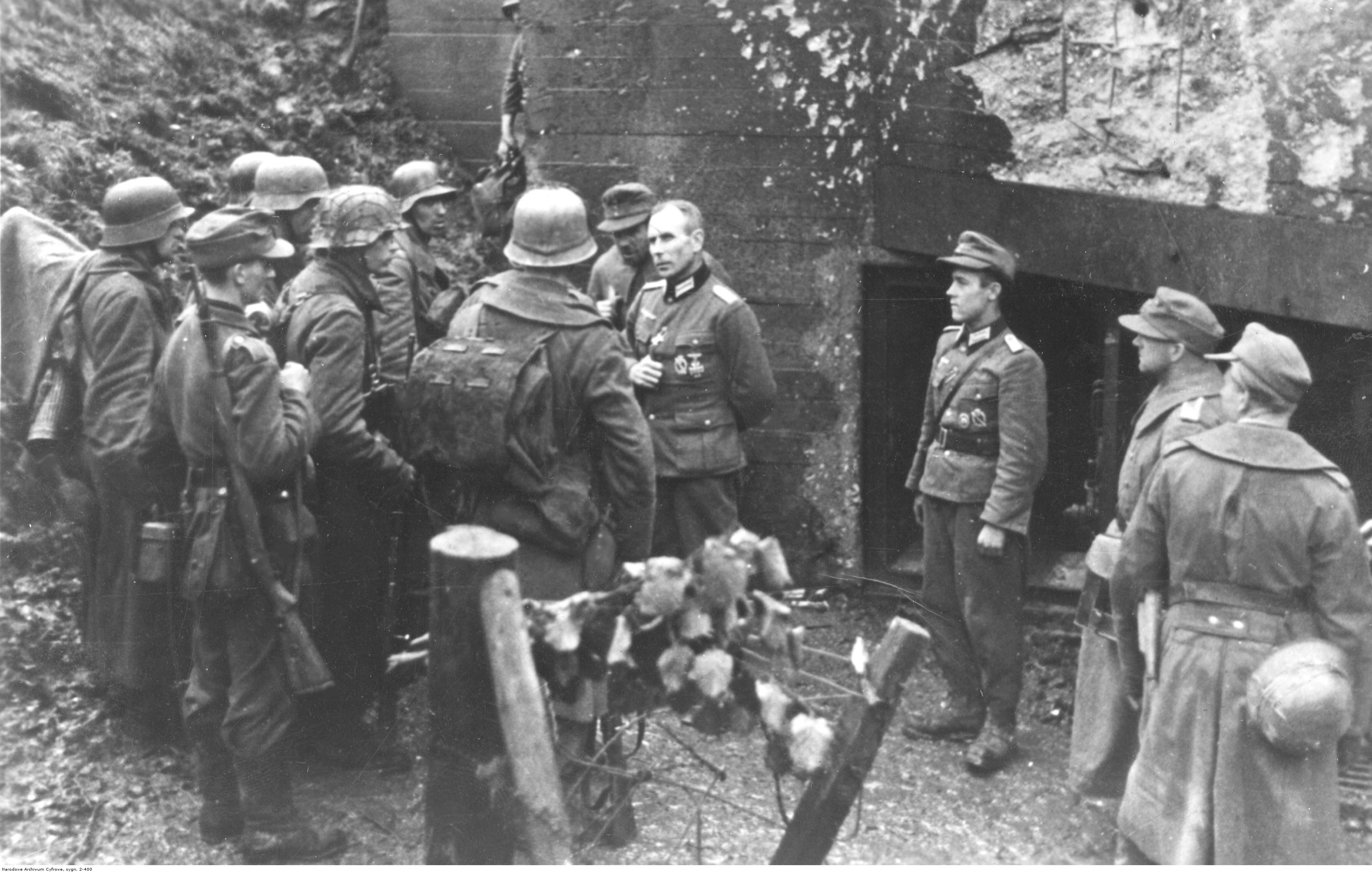
A German reconnaissance patrol during the Battle of Aachen

Aachen and its sector of the front were protected by the Siegfried Line, consisting of several belts of inter-connected pillboxes, forts, and bunkers protected by extensive minefields, "dragon's teeth" anti-tank obstacles, and barbed wire entanglements. In several areas, German defenses were over 10 mi (16 km) deep. Learning from their experiences on the Eastern Front, the Germans ran their main line of resistance down the center of towns located in the defensive wall, taking advantage of narrow streets to limit the mobility of enemy armored vehicles. Despite the low quality of many of the troops manning them, the fortifications protecting Aachen and the Ruhr were a formidable obstacle to the progress of American forces, who saw a breakthrough in this sector as crucial, as the terrain behind Aachen was generally flat, and therefore highly favorable to the motorized Allied armies.

Fighting around Aachen began as early as the second week of September, in a period known to the Germans as the "First Battle of Aachen". At this time, the city was defended by the 116th Panzer Division, under the command of General Gerhard von Schwerin. The proximity of Allied forces had caused the majority of the city's government officials to flee before the evacuation of its citizens was complete. (For this, Hitler had all Nazi officials who had fled stripped of rank and sent to the Eastern front as privates.) Instead of continuing the evacuation, von Schwerin opted to surrender the city to Allied forces; however, on 13 September, before he could deliver a letter of capitulation he had written, von Schwerin was ordered to launch a counterattack against American forces penetrating southwest of Aachen, which he did, using elements of his panzergrenadier forces. The German general's attempt to surrender the city would soon become irrelevant, as his letter was never delivered; instead, it fell into the hands of Adolf Hitler, who ordered the general's immediate arrest. He was replaced by Colonel Gerhard Wilck. (Von Schwerin was ultimately only reprimanded, and later served on the Italian front.) The United States' VII Corps continued to probe German defenses, despite the resistance encountered on 12–13 September. Between 14 and 16 September the US 1st Infantry Division continued its advance in the face of strong defenses and repeated counterattacks, ultimately creating a half-moon arc around the city. This slow advance came to a halt in late September, due to the supply problem, and the diversion of existing stocks of fuel and ammunition for Operation Market Garden in the Netherlands.

== Comparison of forces ==
=== German defenders in Aachen ===
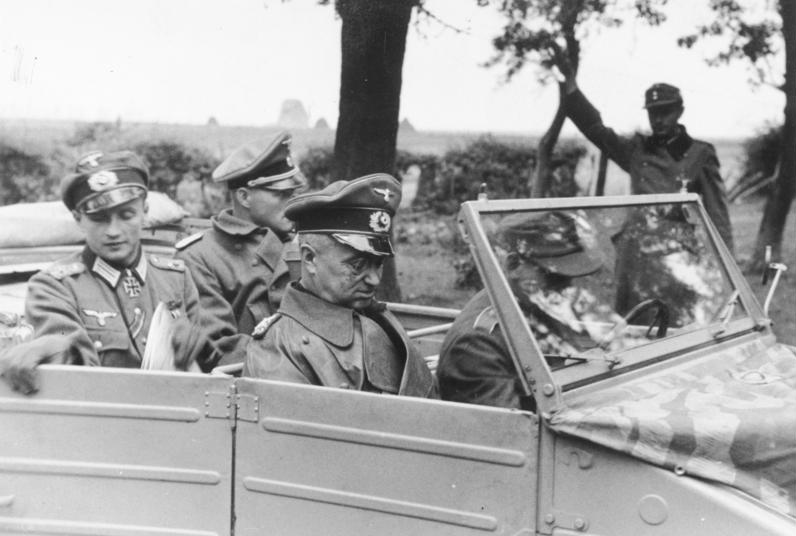
Field Marshal Model visiting the 246th Volksgrenadier Division in Aachen

The Wehrmacht took advantage of the brief respite on the front by pulling the 1st, 2nd, and 12th SS Panzer Divisions, as well as the 9th and 116th Panzer Divisions, off the line. In October, responsibility for the Aachen sector's defense was given to General Friedrich Köchling's LXXXI Corps, which included the 183rd and 246th Volksgrenadier Divisions, as well as the 12th and 49th Infantry Divisions. These forces, along with the attached 506th Tank Battalion and 108th Tank Brigade, numbered roughly 20,000 men and 11 tanks. Köchling was also promised a reformed 116th Panzer Division and the 3rd Panzergrenadier Division, numbering a total of some 24,000 personnel. The 246th Volksgrenadier Division replaced the 116th Panzer Division in Aachen proper, the 183rd Volksgrenadier Division and 49th Infantry Division defended the northern approaches, and the 12th Infantry Division was positioned to the south. On 7 October, elements of the 1st SS Panzer Division Leibstandarte SS Adolf Hitler were released to reinforce the defense of Aachen.

Although reinforcements continued to arrive, LXXXI Corps' units suffered heavily; the 12th Infantry Division had lost half its combat strength between 16 and 23 September, and the 49th and 275th Infantry Divisions had had to be pulled off the line to recuperate. While German infantry divisions generally had a strength of 15,000–17,000 soldiers at the start of World War II, this had gradually been reduced to an official (table of organization) size of 12,500, and by November 1944, the average actual strength of a Heer division was 8,761 men. In an attempt to cope with the manpower shortages plaguing the Wehrmacht, the Volksgrenadier divisions were created in 1944. Their average total strength was just over 10,000 men per division. Although about 1/4 of these were experienced veterans, half were fresh conscripts and convalescents, while the remainder were transferees from the Luftwaffe and Kriegsmarine. These divisions often received the newest small-arms, but were deficient in artillery and motorization, severely limiting their tactical usefulness. In the case of LXXXI Corps, the 183rd Volksgrenadier Division, though overstrength by 643 men, had only been activated in September, meaning that the division had not had time to train as a unit. The 246th Volksgrenadier Division was in a similar state, many of its personnel having received fewer than ten days of infantry training. All of these deficiencies of personnel were offset somewhat by the inherent strength of the well-planned, well-constructed fortifications surrounding Aachen.

=== American forces ===
US General Marshall near Aachen on 11 October 1944

The task of taking Aachen fell to General Charles H. Corlett's XIX Corps' 30th Infantry Division (along with the attached 743rd Tank Battalion) and Joseph Collins' VII Corps' 1st Infantry Division. General Leland Hobbs' 30th Infantry Division would be assisted by the 2nd Armored Division, which would exploit the 30th Division's penetration of the Siegfried Line, while their flanks were protected by the 29th Infantry Division. In the south, the 1st Infantry Division was supported by the 9th Infantry Division and the 3rd Armored Division. These divisions had used the brief respite in the fighting during the last two weeks of September to rest and refit, taking in a large number of replacements. By 1 October, over 70% of the men of General Clarence Huebner's 1st Infantry Division were replacements, and the last two weeks of September were spent giving these men village-fighting and weapons training. The impending offensive's plan called for both infantry divisions to avoid street fighting in Aachen; instead, the two divisions would link up and encircle the city, assigning a relatively small force to capture it while the bulk of US forces continued pushing east.

Although American units were usually able to replenish their numbers quickly, the replacements rarely had sufficient tactical training. Many junior officers were short on tactical and leadership abilities. Some tankers were shipped to Europe without having so much as driven a car before; some tank commanders were forced to teach their men how to load and fire their tank guns in the field prior to missions. The American replacement system, which focused on quantity over quality, ensured that the majority of fresh troops reaching the front lines were not properly trained for combat. It was not unusual for half of a unit's replacements to become casualties within the first few days of combat. These tremendous frontline losses required ever-more troops to be fed into the fighting; for instance, a freshly reinforced battalion of the US 28th Infantry Division was immediately thrown into direct assaults against Aachen to buttress the depleted US 1st Infantry Division during the final stages of the battle on 18–21 October.

These forces were supported by the Ninth Air Force, which had pin-pointed 75% of the pillboxes along the frontlines and planned an opening bombardment including 360 bombers and 72 fighters; fresh aircraft would be used for a second aerial wave, which included the use of napalm. With the Germans having few anti-aircraft batteries and severely limited support from the Luftwaffe, Allied dominance of the sky over Aachen was near total.

== Battle ==
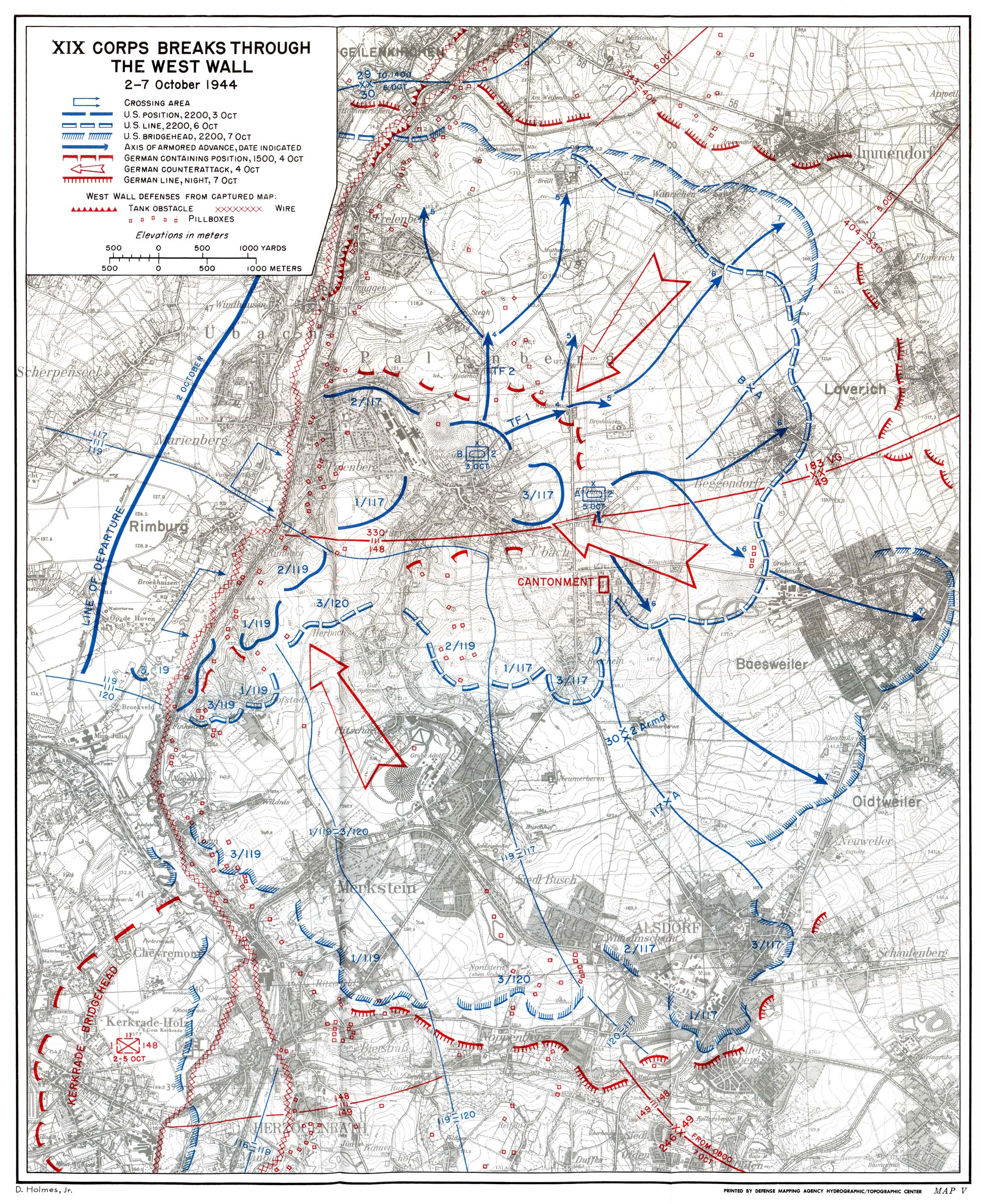
Map of the Battle of Aachen. The map actually shows the front immediately north of Aachen; the main city is south of the map.

On September 12, the American 3rd Armoured Division, supported by the 1st Infantry Division, attacked the lightly held southern flank of Aachen. The Division had split itself into two combat commands (A and B) whereby A, under Lt. Col. Leander L. Doan, would advance in the direction of Oberforstbach and B, under Lt. Col. Truman E. Boudinot, toward Roetgen. Facing them were elements of Paul Mahlmann's 353rd Infantry Division, which had been badly mauled the previous month after the Battle of the Falaise Pocket and Gerhard Müller’s 9th Panzer Division. They held the neglected Scharnhorst Line, a split portion of the Siegfried Line that sat in front of Aachen.

For six days prior to the beginning of the American offensive, Allied heavy artillery targeted German defenses around Aachen. Although the heavy bombardment forced the German LXXXI Corps to halt all daylight personnel and supply movements, it had little effect on the pillboxes and strongpoints. The opening aerial bombardment on 2 October also caused little damage to German defensive positions; the 450 aircraft which took part in the first wave failed to register a single direct hit on any German pillbox. Their targets had been largely obscured by thick smoke from the Allied artillery barrage. As the aircraft finished their assault, the artillery resumed bombarding the front lines, firing 18,696 shells from 372 gun tubes within a couple of hours. It was the first time since the 1939 Saar Offensive that Allied troops stepped into pre-1938 German territory.

=== Advance from the north: 2–8 October ===
The 30th Infantry Division began its advance on 2 October, using divisional heavy artillery to target German pillboxes; even then it took, on average, thirty minutes to capture a single pillbox. The Americans found that if they failed to immediately press on to the next pillbox, the Germans were sure to counterattack. Heavy resistance had not been expected, and one company lost 87 combatants in an hour; another lost 93 out of 120 soldiers to a German artillery strike. The attackers were slowly able to cross the Wurm River and engage German pillboxes with flamethrowers and explosive charges. By the afternoon of 2 October, elements of the 30th Infantry Division had breached German defenses and reached the town of Palenberg. Here, GIs advanced house-to-house and fought a number of gruesome hand grenade duels. (Private Harold G. Kiner would be awarded the Medal of Honor for throwing himself on a German grenade near Palenberg, thus saving the lives of two fellow soldiers.) Fighting in the town of Rimburg was equally terrible; American armor had not been able to get across the Wurm River, and therefore could not provide fire support to infantrymen who were attempting to storm a medieval castle being used as a fort by the Germans. The 30th Infantry Division subdued roughly 50 German pillboxes on the first day of the advance, often having to envelop the structure and attack from the rear. The division's effort was aided by the 29th Infantry Division's diversionary attacks on their flank, leading the Germans to believe that that was the Americans' main attack. On the night of 2 October, the German 902nd Assault Gun Battalion was ordered to launch a counterattack against the 30th Infantry Division, but Allied artillery delayed the start of the raid, and ultimately the attempt failed.

Although American armor became available to support the advance on 3 October, the attacking forces were brought to an abrupt halt after a number of German counterattacks. The town of Rimburg was taken on the second day of the offensive, but fighting through German defenses remained slow as M4 Sherman tanks and M12 Gun Motor Carriage 155 mm (6.1 in) artillery guns were brought up to blast pillboxes at point blank range. Fighting had also begun to develop for the town of Übach, where American tanks rushed in to take the town, only to be pinned down by German artillery. Fierce counterattacks followed, with American artillery fire narrowly preventing the Germans from retaking it. By the end of the day, the forcing of the Wurm River and the creation of a bridgehead had cost the 30th Infantry Division around 300 dead and wounded.

German forces continued their counterattacks on Übach, suffering heavy casualties to American artillery and infantry fire. Although the inability to retake Übach persuaded German commanders that they had insufficient forces to properly defend the approaches to Aachen, the counterattacks did tie down American troops which could have otherwise continued the advance. On 4 October, the Allied advance was limited, with only the towns of Hoverdor and Beggendorf taken, the Americans having lost roughly 1,800 soldiers in the past three days of combat. Better progress was made on 5 October, as the 119th Regiment of the 30th Infantry Division captured Merkstein-Herbach. The following day the Germans launched another counterattack against Übach, again failing to dislodge the Americans. German armor was unable to cope with the overwhelming numerical superiority of the American tanks, and as a last-ditch effort to halt the advance the Germans began concentrated attacks on American positions with what artillery and aircraft they could muster. They found themselves severely hamstrung by lack of reserves, although General Koechling was able to deploy a Tiger detachment to the town of Alsdorf in an attempt to plug the American penetration of Aachen's northern defenses.

A counterattack developed on 8 October, composed of an infantry regiment, the 1st Assault Battalion, a battle group of the 108th Panzer Brigade, and some 40 armored fighting vehicles scavenged from available units. Although hindered by American artillery, the left wing of the attack managed to cut off an American platoon, while the right wing reached a road junction north of the town of Alsdorf. A platoon of Shermans supporting an attack on the town of Mariadorf suddenly found themselves being attacked from the rear, and were able to repel the Germans only after heavy fighting. Two German Sturmgeschütz IV self-propelled assault guns and a squad of infantry entered Alsdorf, where they were heavily counterattacked. Although the two lumbering vehicles somehow eluded American tanks, they were finally engaged by American infantry and forced back to their starting point. With casualties mounting and the Americans drawing closer, the German high command transferred the 3rd Panzergrenadier Division to Aachen, followed by the I SS Panzer Corps, which included the 116th Panzer Division and SS Heavy Panzer Battalion 101, an element of the 1st SS Panzer Division.

=== Advance from the south: 8–11 October ===
In the south, the 1st Infantry Division began its offensive on 8 October, aiming to capture the town of Verlautenheide and Hill 231 near the town of Ravelsberg. Their attack was preceded by a massive artillery barrage, which helped them seize their objectives quickly. On Crucifix Hill, Captain Bobbie E. Brown, commander of C Company, 18th Infantry, personally silenced three pillboxes with pole charges and, despite being wounded, continued to lead his men into the attack, earning the Medal of Honor. By 10 October, the 1st Infantry Division was at its designated position for link-up with the 30th Infantry Division. This success was met with a German counterattack toward Hill 231, which was the scene of an intense firefight; the battle ended with the Germans leaving over 40 dead and 35 prisoners. Despite repeated German counterattacks slowing its advance, the 1st Infantry Division was able to capture the high ground surrounding the city.

On 10 October, General Huebner delivered an ultimatum to German forces in Aachen, threatening to bomb the city into submission if the garrison did not surrender. The German commander categorically refused. In response, American artillery began to pound the city on 11 October, firing an estimated 5,000 shells, or over 169 short tons (153 t) of explosives; it was also subjected to intense bombardment by American aircraft.

=== Link up: 11–16 October ===
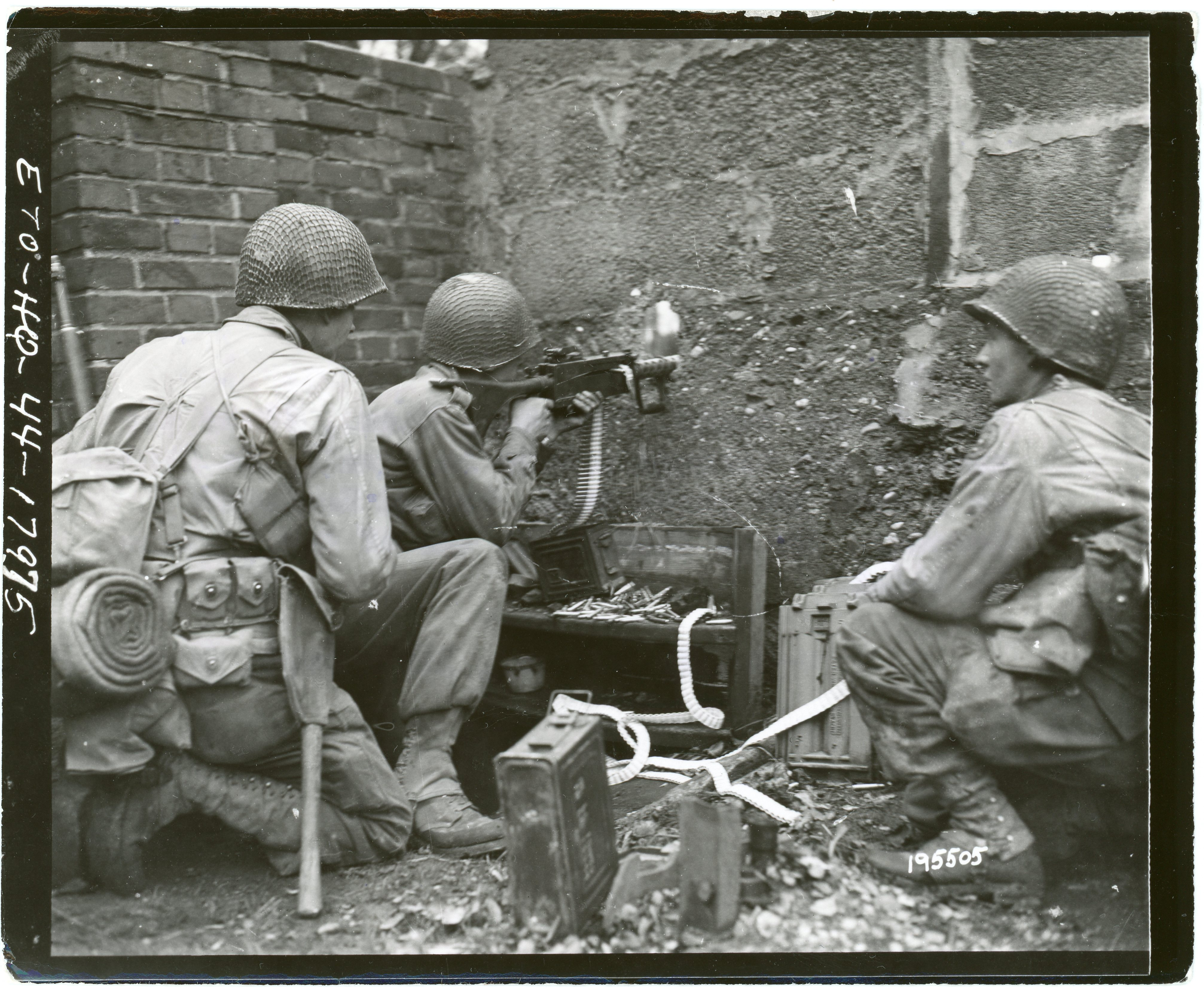
PFC Victor Henry fires a M1919A6 machine gun through a wall

American casualties were climbing, both from frequent German counterattacks and the cost of storming pillboxes. The Germans had spent the night of 10 October turning cellars of houses in the town of Bardenberg into fortified pillboxes; American attackers were forced to withdraw and instead shell the town into submission. On 12 October, the Germans launched a major counterattack against the American 30th Infantry Division. It was disrupted by heavy artillery fire and well-placed anti-tank defenses. At the village of Birk, a three-hour fight broke out between German tanks and a single American Sherman; the Sherman managed to knock out an enemy Panzer IV and force another one to withdraw, but was soon attacked by others. This lone tank was eventually joined by elements of the 2nd Armored Division, and the Germans were driven from the town. The 30th Infantry Division soon found itself in defensive positions all along its front; nevertheless, it was ordered to continue pushing south for its intended link-up with the 1st Infantry Division. To accomplish this, two infantry battalions from the 29th Infantry Division were attached to the hard-pressed 30th.

The same day (12 October), to the south, two German infantry regiments attempted to retake Crucifix Hill from GIs of the 1st Infantry Division. In fierce fighting, the Germans temporarily took control of the hill but were dislodged by the end of the day, with both regiments virtually destroyed. From 11 to 13 October, Allied aircraft bombarded Aachen, selecting targets closest to American lines; on 14 October, the 26th Infantry Regiment was ordered to clear an industrial zone on the edge of Aachen in preparation for the attack on the city itself. On 15 October, in an effort to widen the gap between the two American pincers, the Germans again counterattacked the 1st Infantry Division; although a number of heavy tanks managed to break through American lines, the bulk of the German forces were destroyed by artillery and air support. On the next day, the Germans attempted to mount local counterattacks with the 3rd Panzergrenadier Division, but, after sustaining heavy losses, were forced to suspend further offensive action.

The 30th Infantry Division, with elements of the 29th Infantry and 2nd Armored divisions, continued its push southwards between 13 and 16 October, in the sector of the village of Würselen; however, even with heavy air support, they were unsuccessful in breaking through German defenses and linking up with allied forces to the south. The Germans took advantage of the narrow front to pound advancing attackers with artillery, and progress remained slow as German tanks used houses as bunkers to surprise and overwhelm American foot soldiers. General Hobbs, commander of the 30th Infantry Division, then attempted to outflank the German defenses by attacking along another sector with two infantry battalions. The attack was a success, allowing the 30th and 1st Infantry Divisions to link up on 16 October. The fighting had so far cost the American XIX Corps over 400 dead and 2,000 wounded, with 72% of those from the 30th Infantry Division. The Germans had not fared any better, as up to 14 October around 630 of their soldiers had been killed and 4,400 wounded; another 600 were lost in the 3rd Panzergrenadier Division's counterattack on the US 1st Infantry Division on 16 October.

=== Fight for the city: 13–21 October ===
Films shot on 13, 14 and 15 October 1944 in Aachen by US forces.

Unedited 35mm film footage of the battle filmed by US forces on 15 October 1944.

Needing most of its manpower to stave off German counterattacks and secure the area around Aachen, the 1st Infantry Division was able to earmark only a single regiment for the job of taking the city. The task fell to the 26th Infantry Regiment, under the command of Colonel John F. R. Seitz, which had only two of its three battalions on hand. Armed with machine guns and flamethrowers, the 2nd and 3rd Infantry Battalions would at first be aided only by a few tanks and a single 155 mm (6.1 in) howitzer. The city was defended by roughly 5,000 German troops, including converted navy, air force and city police personnel. For the most part, these soldiers were inexperienced and untrained, and were only supported by a handful of tanks and assault guns. However, Aachen's defenders could make use of the maze of streets which occupied its historical center.

The 26th Infantry's initial attack on 13 October provided important insight on the nature of the fighting; American infantry had been ambushed by German defenders using sewers and cellars, forcing the advancing American infantry to clear each opening before continuing down streets, while Sherman tanks found it impossible to maneuver to suppress enemy fire. German civilians were cleared as the 26th Infantry advanced; no Germans were allowed to remain in the Americans' rear. Success in Aachen was measured by the number of houses captured, as the advance proved to be sluggish; in order to cope with the thick walls of the older buildings in the city, the 26th Infantry Regiment used its howitzer at point blank range to destroy German fortifications. The howitzer created passageways that allowed infantrymen to advance from building to building without having to enter the city's streets, where they could be pinned down by enemy fire. Sherman tanks were ambushed, as they entered intersections, by concealed German anti-tank guns. Soon thereafter, American tanks and other armored vehicles would advance cautiously, often shooting buildings ahead of the accompanying infantry to clear them of possible defenders. Pinned on the surface by Allied aircraft, German infantrymen would use sewers to deploy behind American formations to attack them from the rear. German resistance was fierce, as they launched small counterattacks and used armor to halt American movements.

Additional American armor was needed to break the German resistance. General Huebner requested a tank battalion which was detached from the 3rd Armored Division. The 3rd Battalion, 33rd Armored Regiment, commanded by Lieutenant Colonel Samuel M Hogan, was attached to the 1st Infantry Division. Their mission was to assault in the north, protecting the flank of the 3rd Battalion of the 26th Infantry while seizing the heights that dominated the central part of Aachen overlooking the German command posts located at the Hotel Quellenhof. Once the Lousberg heights were captured, Task Force Hogan would proceed down the reverse slope in order to cut off the Aachen-Laurensberg highway, thus preventing a German counterattack from the Northeast.

On 18 October, the 3rd Battalion of the 26th Infantry Regiment prepared to assault the Hotel Quellenhof, which was one of the last areas of resistance in the city. American tanks and other guns were firing on the hotel, which was the city's defense headquarters, at point blank range. That night, 300 soldiers of the 1st SS Battalion were able to reinforce the hotel and defeat several attacks on the building. A furious German counterattack managed to overrun a number of American infantry positions outside of the hotel, and temporarily released pressure on the Quellenhof before being beaten off by concerted American mortar fire.

Two events then aided the final advance. First, to lessen frontline infantry casualties, it was decided to barrage remaining German strongpoints with 155 mm guns. Secondly, to assist the 1st Infantry Division, a battalion of the 110th Infantry Regiment, US 28th Infantry Division, had been moved up from the V Corps sector on 18 October to close a gap between forward 26th Infantry Regiment elements within the city. The defensive mission of this new battalion was changed on 19–20 October to closely support the urban assault, participating as the depleted regiment's missing third battalion. On 21 October, soldiers of the 26th Infantry Regiment, supported by the reinforced battalion of the 110th Infantry Regiment finally conquered central Aachen; that day also marked the surrender of the last German garrison, in the Hotel Quellenhof, ending the battle for the city.

== Aftermath ==
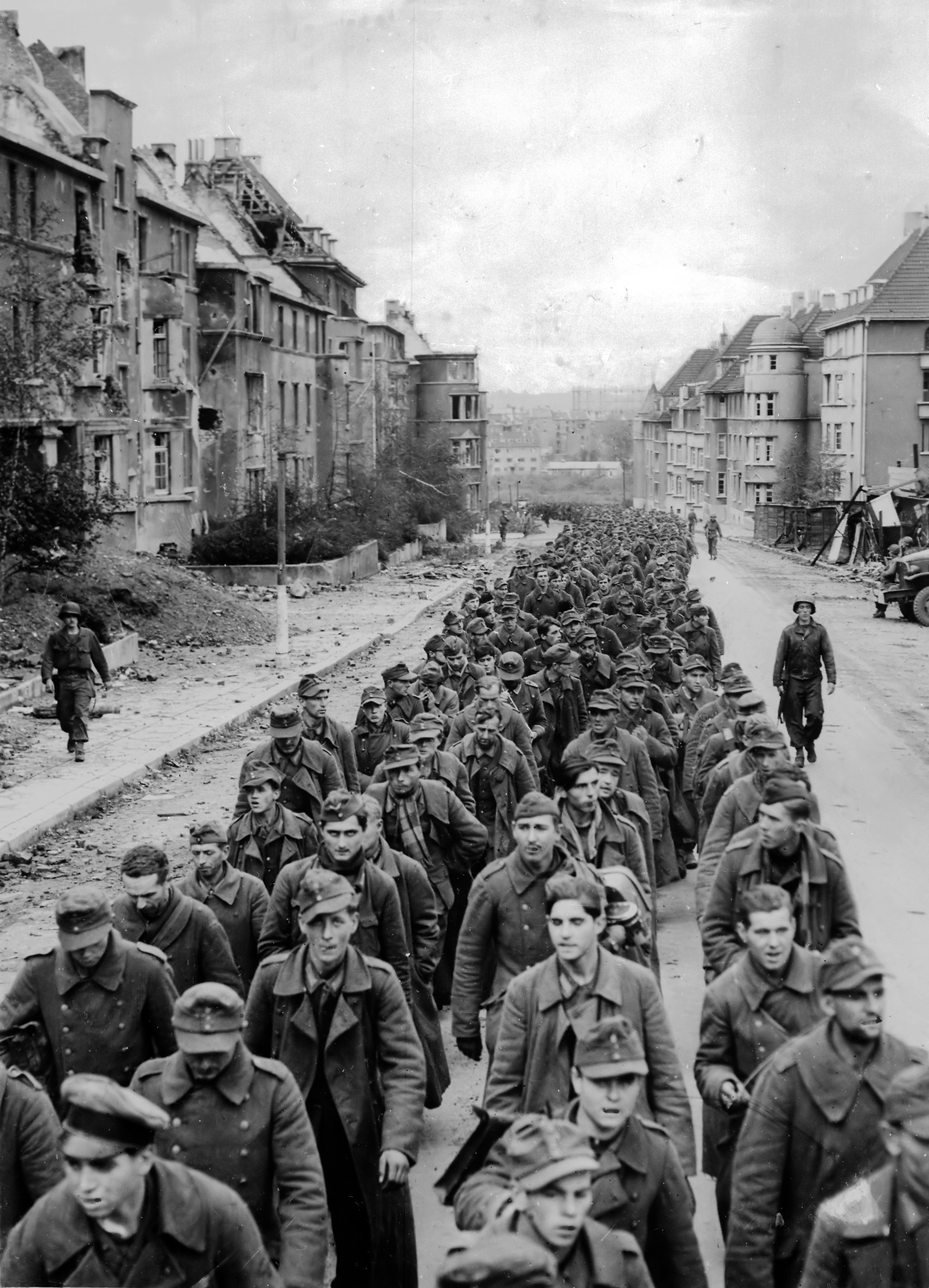
German prisoners in Aachen

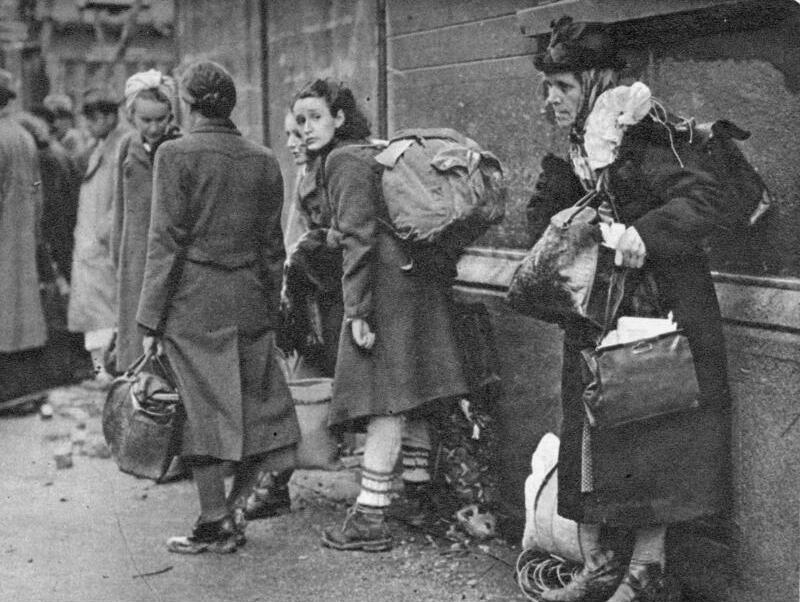
Refugees leaving the destroyed city of Aachen, October 23, 1944.

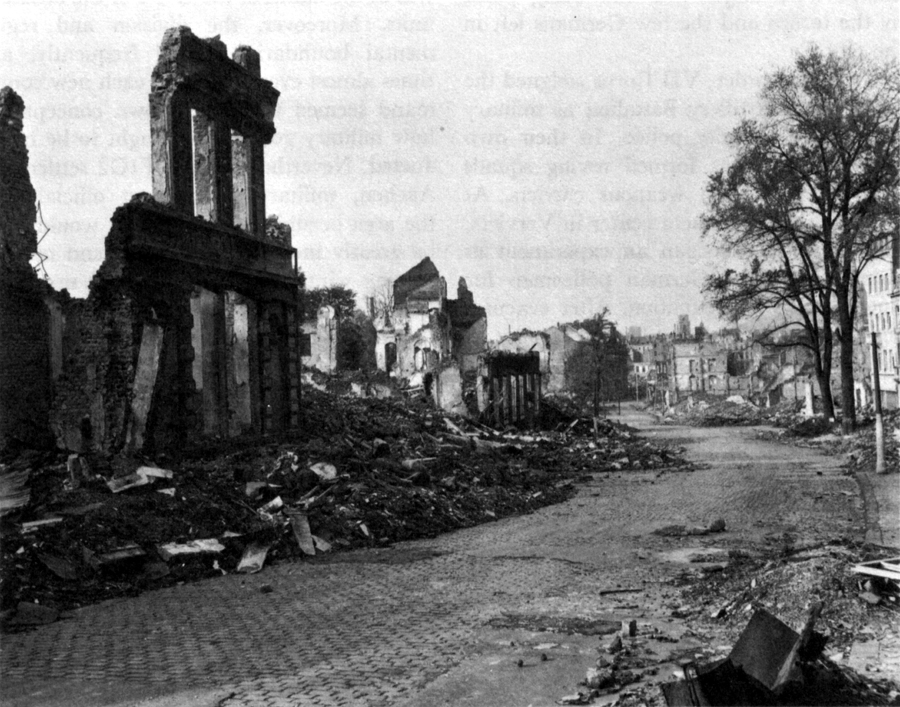
The city in ruins, November 1, 1944

The Battle of Aachen had cost both sides dearly; the Americans suffered over 7,000 casualties, the Germans over 5,000, with a further 5,600 taken prisoner. Already bombed many times during the war, 85% of Aachen was destroyed when captured. Since 2 October 1944, the 30th Infantry Division suffered roughly 3,000 men killed and wounded, while the 1st Infantry Division took at least 1,350 casualties (150 killed and 1,200 wounded). The Germans lost another 5,100 casualties during the fighting in Aachen itself, including 3,473 prisoners. In the process of the battle, the Wehrmacht lost two complete divisions and had another eight severely depleted, including three fresh infantry divisions and a single refitted armored division; this was largely attributed to how they fought, as although an equivalent of 20 infantry battalions had been used during various counterattacks against the 30th Infantry Division alone, on average each separate attack only involved two infantry regiments. During the conflict, the Germans also developed a respect for the fighting ability of American forces, noting their capability to fire indiscriminately with overwhelming amounts of artillery fire support and armored forces. Both the 30th Infantry and 1st Infantry divisions received distinguished unit citations for their actions at Aachen.

However, German resistance in Aachen upset Allied plans to continue their eastward advance. Following the end of fighting in Aachen, the Western Allies' First Army was tasked with the capture of a series of dams behind the Hürtgen Forest, which could be used by the Germans to flood the valleys which opened the road to Berlin. This would lead to the Battle of Hürtgen Forest, which was to prove more difficult than the Battle of Aachen. Aachen was for almost six months the only large German city captured by the Western Allies; the 400 square miles (1,000 km^{2}) south of Aachen that the Allies occupied by 16 September would be 40% of all German soil SHAEF held before 1945.

On November 16, fighting in areas to the north and to the east of Aachen reignited (the Battle of the Roer Plain, see Operation Queen). The 30th Infantry Division eliminated an enemy salient northeast of Aachen (16 November), then pushed to the Inde River at Inden/Altdorf (28 November). The 2nd Armored Division has, by the end of the month, captured Barmen, which overlooks the Roer River valley (but the river was not crossed until the next year). British and American forces made progress near Geilenkirchen in Operation Clipper.

The United States flag was probably raised for the first time above German soil in Monschau on 29 September. The occupation of Aachen gave the Army its first experience of what would become the Office of Military Government, United States. Because of the lack of records Germans had to be hired to investigate German candidates for public office, and Nazi press threatened those who accepted positions. Franz Oppenhoff was appointed Mayor of Aachen by the Allies on 31 October, but was assassinated by Werwolf on Heinrich Himmler's orders on 25 March 1945.
