= 357th Infantry Division =

- Active: March 1944-1945
- Country: Nazi Germany
- Branch: Heer (Wehrmacht)
- Type: Infantry
- Size: Division
- Engagements: World War II: Proskurov–Chernovtsy Offensive; Battle of the Dukla Pass; Operation Southwind; Bratislava–Brno Offensive

The 357th Infantry Division (German: 357. Infanterie-Division) was a German infantry division in World War II.

== History ==
It was formed on 11 November 1943 in Radom, General Government (Poland) from personnel of the 327. Infantry-Division and new recruits born in 1926, as part of the 21. Welle (21st wave of mobilization).

After her training, in March 1944, she was transferred to the Eastern Front. It fought near Tarnopol and Mukachevo and suffered heavy casualties.

It was reorganized in August 1944 as part of the 31. Welle (31st wave of mobilization) from the Schatten-Division Breslau. The unit was deployed again on the Eastern Front against the Red Army and fought in Hungary, Slovakia and later in the South Moravian region. On May 8, 1945, the unit surrendered to the Red Army in the Deutsch-Brod area in Bohemia.

== Commanding officers ==
- Generalleutnant Wolfgang von Kluge, (1 December 1943 – 1 April 1944)
- Generalmajor Knut Eberding, (1 April 1944 - 10 May 1944)
- Generalmajor Norbert Holm, (10 May 1944 - 12 September 1944)
- Generalleutnant Josef Rintelen. (12 September 1944 - 8 May 1945).
