= 564th Volksgrenadier Division =

Wehrmacht division

564th Volksgrenadier Division 564th Grenadier Division
- 564. Volksgrenadier-Division; 564. Grenadier-Division
- Active: 1944
- Country: Germany
- Branch: German Army
- Type: Volksgrenadier
- Size: Division

Commanders
- Notable commanders: Wolfgang Lange

The 564th Volksgrenadier Division (German: 564. Volksgrenadier-Division) was a volksgrenadier division of the German Army during the Second World War that existed from 26 August to 15 September 1944.

== History ==
The division was formed on 26 August 1944 at the Döllersheim area in Austria as the 564th Grenadier Division, and was renamed Volksgrenadier at the end of August. In the middle of September it was combined with the 183rd Infantry Division and was redesignated as the 183rd Volksgrenadier Division. During the existence of the 564th, it was commanded by Wolfgang Lange.

== Structure ==
It consisted of the following units.

- 1150th Grenadier Regiment
- 1151st Grenadier Regiment
- 1152nd Grenadier Regiment
- 1564th Artillery Regiment
- 1564th Fusilier Battalion
- 1564th Engineer Battalion
- 1564th Signal Battalion
- 1564th Tank Destroyer Battalion
- 1564th Divisional Supply Troops

== Bibliography ==
- Mitcham, Samuel W. (2007). German Order of Battle: 291st–999th Infantry Divisions, Named Infantry Divisions, and Special Divisions in WWII. Vol. 2. Mechanicsburg: Stackpole Books. ISBN 978-0-8117-3437-0.
