= Sieler =

Sieler is a German surname.

Notable people with this surname include:

- Alan Sieler (born 1948), Australian cricketer
- Cynthia Sieler, former name of Cynthia Doerner (born 1951), Australian tennis player and coach
- Ernst Sieler (1893–1983), German general
- Zach Sieler (born 1995), American footballer
