= 116th Panzer Division =

German army division during World War II

- 116. Panzer-Division
- Unit insignia
- Active: 1944–45
- Country: Germany
- Branch: Army
- Type: Panzer
- Role: Armoured warfare
- Size: Division
- Nickname(s): Greyhound Division (Windhund-Division)
- Motto(s): Schnell wie ein Windhund, Zäh wie Leder, Hart wie Kruppstahl, Windhund Vor! "Fast as a greyhound, tough as leather, hard as Kruppsteel, Greyhound forward!"
- Engagements: Western Front (1944-45): Operation Overlord; Operation Cobra; Siegfried Line campaign; Battle of Aachen; Battle of Hürtgen Forest; Battle of the Bulge; Western invasion of Germany; Ruhr Pocket

Commanders
- Notable Commanders: Gerhard Graf von Schwerin; Gerhard Wilck

The 116th Panzer Division, also known as the "Windhund (Greyhound) Division", was a German armoured formation that saw combat during World War II.

== History ==
=== Formation ===
The 116th Division was constituted in the Rhineland and Westphalia areas of western Germany in March 1944 from the remnants of the 16th Panzergrenadier Division, and the 179th Reserve Panzer Division. The 16th had suffered heavy casualties in combat on the Eastern Front near Stalingrad, and the 179th was a second-line formation that had been on occupation duty in France since 1943.

=== Western Front ===
In 1944, it participated in opposing the Normandy landings, the Battle of Normandy, and was later trapped in the Falaise Pocket following Operation Cobra, Operation Bluecoat, Operation Totalize, and Operation Tractable.

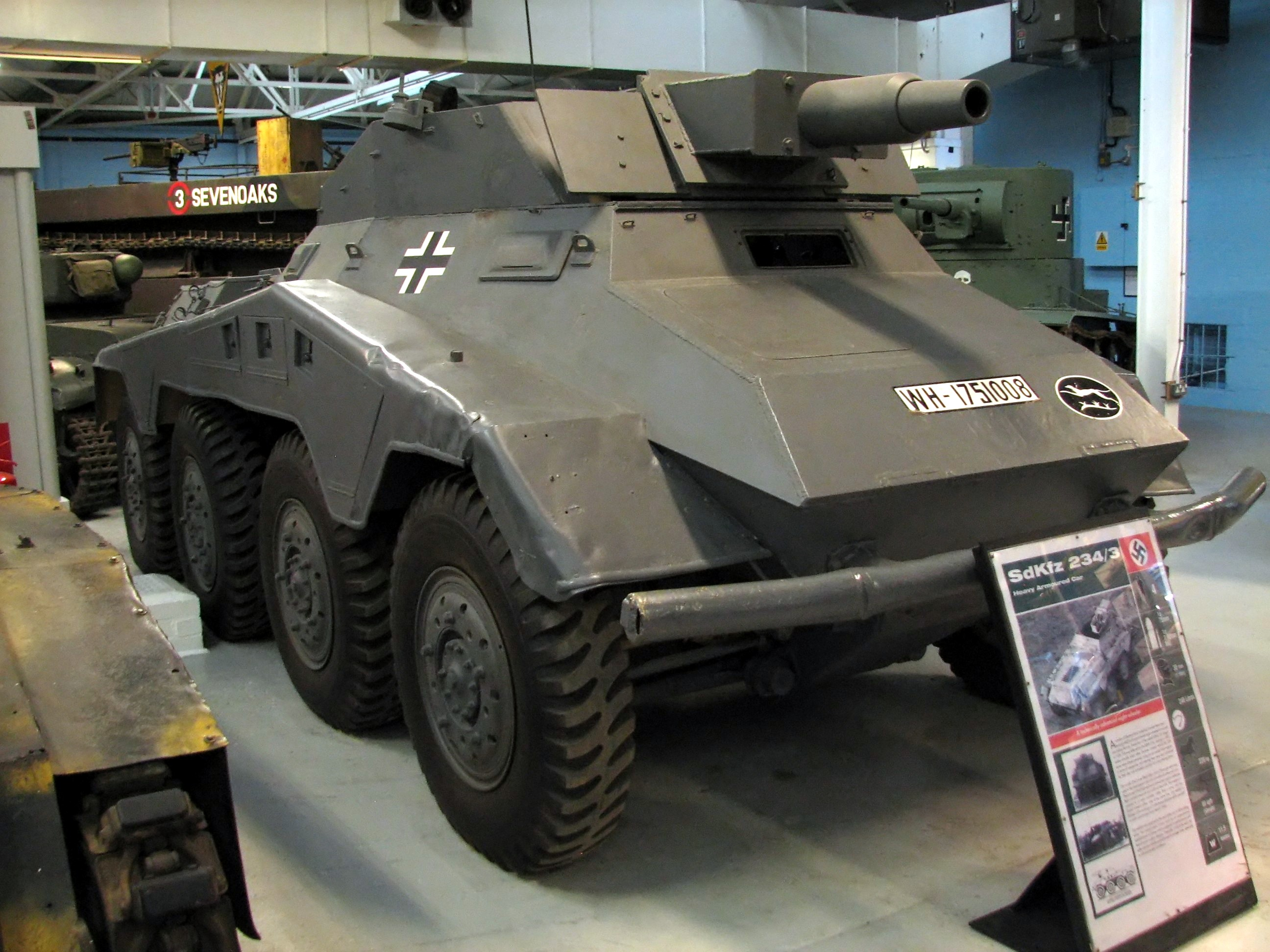
German Sd.Kfz. 234/3 armored car at The Tank Museum, Bovington. This vehicle bears the insignia of the 116th Panzer Division.

Along with the 2nd SS Panzer Division, it was responsible for holding the pocket open to allow German troops to escape. It managed to escape, although with only 600 infantry and 12 tanks intact. In October, it fought against American forces in the Battle of Aachen, with the town falling to the Americans on 21 October. It was moved to Düsseldorf for refitting. On 8 November, the division repulsed an attack from the U.S. 28th Infantry Division in the Hürtgen Forest during the larger Battle of Hürtgen Forest, recapturing the town of Schmidt, thus providing the name to the 28th of the "Bloody Bucket Division".

The 116th then participated in the failed "Wacht am Rhein" Operation in the Ardennes. On 10 December, before the offensive, it was partly refitted, with 26 Panzer IV and 43 Panther tanks and 25 Jagdpanzer IV tank destroyers (of which 13 were combat ready). However, it was still missing much of its organic transport. Initially stalled by the resistance and then poor bridges in attacks to cross the Our River at Luetzkampen and Ouren, it back-tracked to march through Belgium from Dasburg to Houffalize. The division then fought its way as the middle spearhead of the advance on the Meuse from Samree to La Roche. It was then involved in heavy fighting at Hotton and Verdenne, where it was turned back at its furthest advance in the Ardennes.

It later delayed Allied forces allowing other German units to retreat, before being withdrawn over the Rhine in March. It then opposed the U.S. Ninth Army's advance across the Rhine, thus stopping the planned Allied breakthrough as well as opposing Operation Varsity's airborne landings. With 2,800 men and 10 tanks against 50,000 Allied troops and supporting tanks, the division faced the U.S. 30th, the U.S. 35th, the U.S. 84th, the 4th Canadian and the U.S. 8th Armored Divisions. On 16 April 1945, the majority of the division was forced to surrender to the U.S. Ninth Army, having been trapped in the Ruhr Pocket. Remnants of the division continued to fight in the Harz mountains until 30 April, surrendering only after all of their resources had been exhausted.

== Commanders ==
- Oberst Günther von Manteuffel, creation – 30 April 1944
- General der Panzertruppe Gerhard Graf von Schwerin, 1 May 1944 – 7 August 1944 and 24 August 1944 – 14 September 1944
- Generalmajor Heinrich Voigtsberger - 15 September 1944 – 19 September 1944
- Generalmajor Siegfried von Waldenburg, 19 September 1944 – German surrender (4 May 1945)

== Order of battle ==
- 16th Panzer Regiment
- 60th Panzergrenadier Regiment
- 156th Panzergrenadier Regiment
- 146th Panzer Artillery Regiment
- 116th Panzer Reconnaissance Battalion
- 281st Army Flak Battalion
- 228th Panzerjager Battalion
- 675th Panzer Engineer Battalion
- 228th Panzer Signals Battalion
- 146th Field-Replacement Battalion

== See also ==
- List of German divisions in World War II
- Organisation of a SS Panzer Division
- Panzer division

== Sources ==
- Blumenson, Martin (1961). Breakout and Pursuit. Archived from the original on 31 October 2011.
- Cole, Hugh M. (1965). The Ardennes: Battle of the Bulge. Archived from the original on 12 December 2012.
- Jung, Hermann (1971). Die Ardennen Offensive: 1944/45. ISBN 3-7881-1413-4.
- MacDonald, Charles B. (1963). The Siegfried Line Campaign. Archived from the original on 15 June 2010.
- MacDonald, Charles B. (1973). The Last Offensive. Archived from the original on 31 October 2011.
- Rosado, Jorge; Bishop, Chris (2005). The Essential Tank Identification Guide—Wehrmacht Panzer Divisions 1939–1945. Amber Books. ISBN 1-904687-46-6.
- Deprin, Yves (2011). Panzer En Normandie : Histoire des Équipages de Char de la 116. Panzerdivision (Juillet-Août 1944). YSEC Éditions. ISBN 978-2-84673-135-5.
