= General Holmes =

General Holmes may refer to:

- Arthur Holmes Jr. (born 1931), U.S. Army major general
- Henry Holmes (British Army officer) (1703–1762), British Army lieutenant general
- James M. Holmes (born 1957), U.S. Air Force general
- John Holmes (British Army officer) (born 1949), British Army major general
- Julius C. Holmes (1899–1968), U.S. Army brigadier general
- Matt Holmes (Royal Marines officer) (1967–2021), Royal Marines major general
- Noel Holmes (1891–1982), British Army major general
- Theophilus H. Holmes (1804–1880), Confederate States Army lieutenant general
- William Holmes (Australian general) (1862–1917), Australian Army major general
- William Holmes (British Army officer, born 1892) (1892–1969), British Army lieutenant general

== See also ==
- General Holm (disambiguation)
