= General Holm =

General Holm may refer to:

- Jeanne M. Holm (1921–2010), U.S. Air Force major general
- Karl Eric Holm (1919–2016), Swedish Army lieutenant general
- Norbert Holm (1895–1962), German Wehrmacht major general

== See also ==
- General Holmes (disambiguation)
