= 304th Infantry Division (Wehrmacht) =

Infantry division of the German Heer

The 304th Infantry Division (German: 304. Infanterie-Division) was an infantry division of the German Heer during World War II. The 304th Infantry Division was deployed twice, once in November 1940 and once again in February 1945, after the destruction of the previous formation in January of that same year.

== History ==
=== First deployment ===
The 304th Infantry Division was formed as a static infantry division on 15 November 1940 as part of the 13th Aufstellungswelle in the area north of Leipzig. Its initial recruits were drawn from a third each of the 56th and 294th Infantry Divisions. The division was initially commanded by Heinrich Krampf.

Initially, the 304th Infantry Division consisted of the following parts:

- Infantry Regiment 573 (three battalions), drawn from members of the 56th Infantry Division.
- Infantry Regiment 574 (three battalions), drawn from members of the 294th Infantry Division.
- Infantry Regiment 575 (three battalions), drawn from members of both the 56th and the 294th Infantry Divisions.
- Artillery Regiment 304 (three detachments), drawn from members of the 56th, 294th, and 162nd Infantry Divisions.
- Division Units 304

The Artillery Regiment initially consisted of three detachments rather than the usual four, and those three detachment were understaffed in terms of batteries, only receiving the third battery of each detachment as late as 19 July 1942. On that same day, the three infantry regiments received their respective fourteenth companies. The thirteenth companies were only added in December 1942.

In May 1941, the 304th Infantry Division was transferred to Belgium for occupation duties.

The division was restructured from a static division to an attack division on 21 October 1942. It was transferred to the Eastern Front in December 1942. There, it fought against Red Army formations in the southern Don river area in the winter of 1942/1943. The division's first action was in the Donets sector, where it performed poorly. Starting on 16 November 1942, Ernst Sieler took command of the division, beginning his first of four tenures as division commander of the 304th Infantry Division. Said tenure ended on 1 February 1943, when he was briefly replaced by Alfred Philippi, but Sieler once again took the post on 1 March 1943 to begin his second tenure.

On 20 February 1943, during the military reorganizations in the immediate aftermath of the German defeat in the Battle of Stalingrad, Infantry Regiment 574 was dissolved. Another regiment carrying the same ordinal number, the Grenadier Regiment 574, was reassembled on 4 May 1943, using forces from Security Regiment 610, then part of the 403rd Security Division.

The retreat of Army Group Don from Stalingrad caused significant disarray in the sector at large and in the 304th Infantry Division in particular.

The 304th Infantry Division was refreshed with new reinforcements in April 1943. The second and third battalions of Infantry Regiment 375, then attached to the 454th Security Division, became the new third battalion of Infantry Regiment 575 and the new third battalion of Infantry Regiment 573, respectively. These two new battalions were short-lived; they were deleted from the registry of the German military postal service in December 1943.

Between March and September 1943, the 304th Infantry Division defended a sector of the Mius river. The division suffered heavy losses at Taganrog, and withdrew under significant Soviet pressure to the Dnieper bend. On 30 August 1943, Sieler was replaced as divisional commander by Norbert Holm, but once again returned to the post for a third tenure starting in October 1943. In the spring of 1944 it fought during the Odessa Offensive.

After Army Group North Ukraine was redeployed to the Generalgouvernement, the 304th Infantry Division was strengthened by the third battalion of Grenadier Regiment 685, previously part of the 336th ("Crimean") Infantry Division. The attached artillery regiment, Artillery Regiment 304, was supplied with parts of the first battery of Artillery Regiment 214 and of Reserve Artillery Detachment 14, the latter having previously been part of the 174th Reserve Division. as well as four additional artillery batteries.

On 1 January 1945, the division, then under command of the 4th Panzer Army of Army Group A, had a strength of 10,667 men.

The 304th Infantry Division was destroyed in January 1945 in the southern Vistula region. The Soviet penetration of the Baranov/Sandomierz bridgehead had shattered the German defense in the region. The remaining survivors of the 304th Division were sent to Prague to prepare for the division's redeployment. On 10 January, Sieler had been replaced temporarily as divisional commander by Ulrich Liss, only for Liss to be heavily wounded and captured on 22 January.

Sieler then returned for his fourth and final tenure as divisional commander of the 304th Infantry Division, a post he would hold until 6 April.

=== Second deployment ===
The 304th Infantry Division was redeployed on 28 February 1945. By April, the division consisted of the following parts:

- Grenadier Regiment 573 (two battalions), drawn from the first and second battalions of Grenadier Regiment Böhmen-Mähren.
- Grenadier Regiment 574 (two battalions), drawn from the remnants of the previous iteration of the 304th Infantry Division.
- Grenadier Regiment 575 (two battalions), drawn from the Führer Youth Grenadier Regiment 1247.
- Division Fusilier Battalion 304, drawn from the first battalion of Grenadier Regiment Böhmen-Mähren.
- Artillery Regiment 304 (three detachments (numbered I, III, IV)), fourth detachment drawn from the fourth detachment of Artillery Regiment 83 of the 100th Jäger Division.

The redeployed 304th Infantry Division was trapped in the Deutsch-Brod pocket and taken prisoner by the Red Army, capitulating after German surrender on 9 May 1945.

The final two commanders of the division had been Robert Bader, who took the post from Sieler on 6 April 1945, and one Oberst Friedrich Krüger (not to be confused with Friedrich-Wilhelm Krüger of the SS), who surrendered to the Soviet forces on 9 May 1945.

== Noteworthy individuals ==
- Heinrich Krampf, commander of the 304th Infantry Division (15 November 1940 – 16 November 1942).
- Ernst Sieler, commander of the 304th Infantry Division (16 November 1942 – 1 February 1943, 1 March 1943 – 30 August 1943, October 1943 – 10 January 1945, 22 January 1945 – 6 April 1945).
- Alfred Philippi, commander of the 304th Infantry Division (1 February 1943 – 1 March 1943).
- Norbert Holm, commander of the 304th Infantry Division (30 August 1943 – October 1943).
- Ulrich Liss, commander of the 304th Infantry Division (10 January 1945 – 22 January 1945).
- Robert Bader, commander of the 304th Infantry Division (6 April 1945 – April 1945).
- Friedrich Krüger, commander of the 304th Infantry Division (April 1945 – 9 May 1945).
