= Battle of Otterlo =

1945 battle in the Netherlands

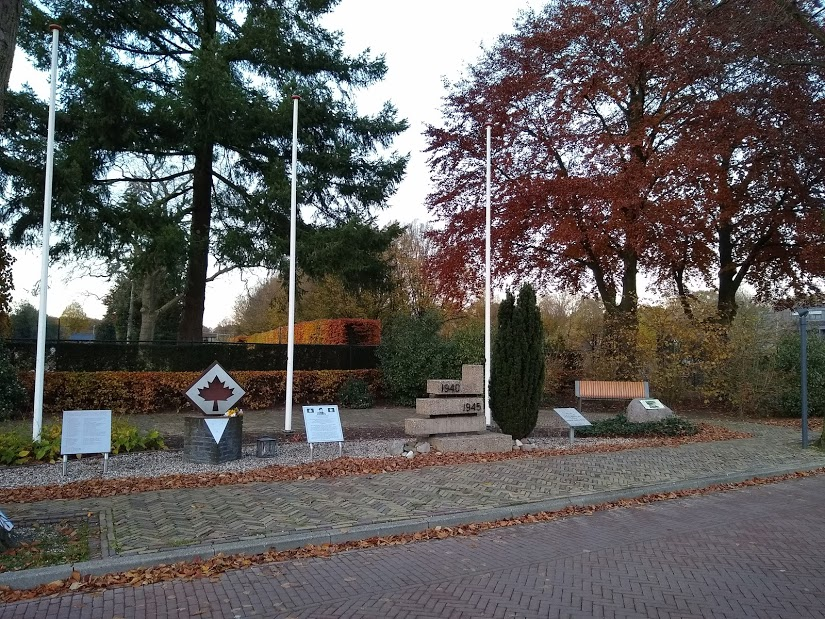
- Monument dedicated to the battle
Date	16 – 17 April 1945
Location	Otterlo 52°6′N 5°46′E
Result	Allied victory

Belligerents
Canada; United Kingdom	Germany

Commanders and leaders
Bert Hoffmeister	Alfred Philippi

Units involved
5th Canadian Division: Irish Regiment of Canada	361st Volksgrenadier Division: 952nd Regiment

Strength
c. 200	c. 1,000

Casualties and losses
17 Canadians killed 6 British killed	150–200 killed
- 4 civilians killed

The Battle of Otterlo was fought in the Netherlands on 16-17 April 1945. German soldiers were encircled on the De Hoge Veluwe National Park and unexpectedly attacked the already liberated Dutch village Otterlo, leading to fierce fighting in hand-to-hand combat. It resulted in an Allied victory, thanks to the deployment of flamethrower tanks, and considerable German losses.

== Background ==
In April 1945, Allied forces liberated large portions of the Netherlands above the river Rhine and advanced quickly north, resulting in the liberation of Groningen from 13-16 April 1945. As a flank protection, the Veluwe region was liberated from 14–18 April in Operation Cleanser and Operation Cannonshot, including Otterlo on 16 April by Canadian and British troops. Remaining German troops in the Veluwe were encircled and expected to surrender while the main army moved on to Barneveld. However, troops from the 361 Volksgrenadier Division, Regiment 952 assembled in the village of Hoenderloo and decided to attempt a breakout through Otterlo on the night of 17 April, hoping to join fellow German forces in the region called Festung Holland ("Fortress Holland") for a last stand that never took place. Allied intelligence overlooked the Hoenderloo gathering, and forces in Otterlo were caught by surprise.

== The Battle ==
Around midnight, the first German troops surrounded and attacked a small squad outside of Otterlo as a distraction. Next about 25 soldiers raced into Otterlo and opened fire. About 800–1000 German soldiers attacked the village from the north, resulting in fierce fighting and hand-to-hand combat. The fighting continued the whole night, including an artillery attack at about 4:30am. The Germans had the upper hand when a few retreating Allied soldiers encountered scouts from a tank division stationed at the nearby Kröller-Müller museum by chance. Tanks soon appeared on the battlefield, including flamethrower-equipped Universal Carriers, and turned the tide.

== Casualties ==
=== Canadian and British ===
According to the grave memorial in Otterlo, 17 Canadians and 6 British soldiers lost their lives. No civilians lost their lives during the night, although four civilians had died during the earlier liberation of Otterlo at 15 and 16 April and are therefore mentioned as well.

=== German ===
The number of German losses is unclear. 62 German graves are documented: 24 bodies in a local mass grave (cleared in 1949) and 37 bodies buried at the German war cemetery in Ysselsteyn. However eyewitness accounts, war correspondence reports, and the regiment diary report many more casualties, including teenage soldiers. Numbers vary between 150 and 200 dead, with a CBC radio podcast suggesting up to 400.

== See also ==
- The Battle of Otterlo (documentary)
- Traces of War
