= 304th Division =

304th Division may refer to:

- 304th Infantry Division (Wehrmacht), Germany
- 304th Rifle Division, Soviet Union
- 304th Air Division, United States
- 304th Division (Vietnam)

== See also ==
- List of military divisions by number
