= Battle of Crucifix Hill =

1944 battle of World War II

- Part of World War II
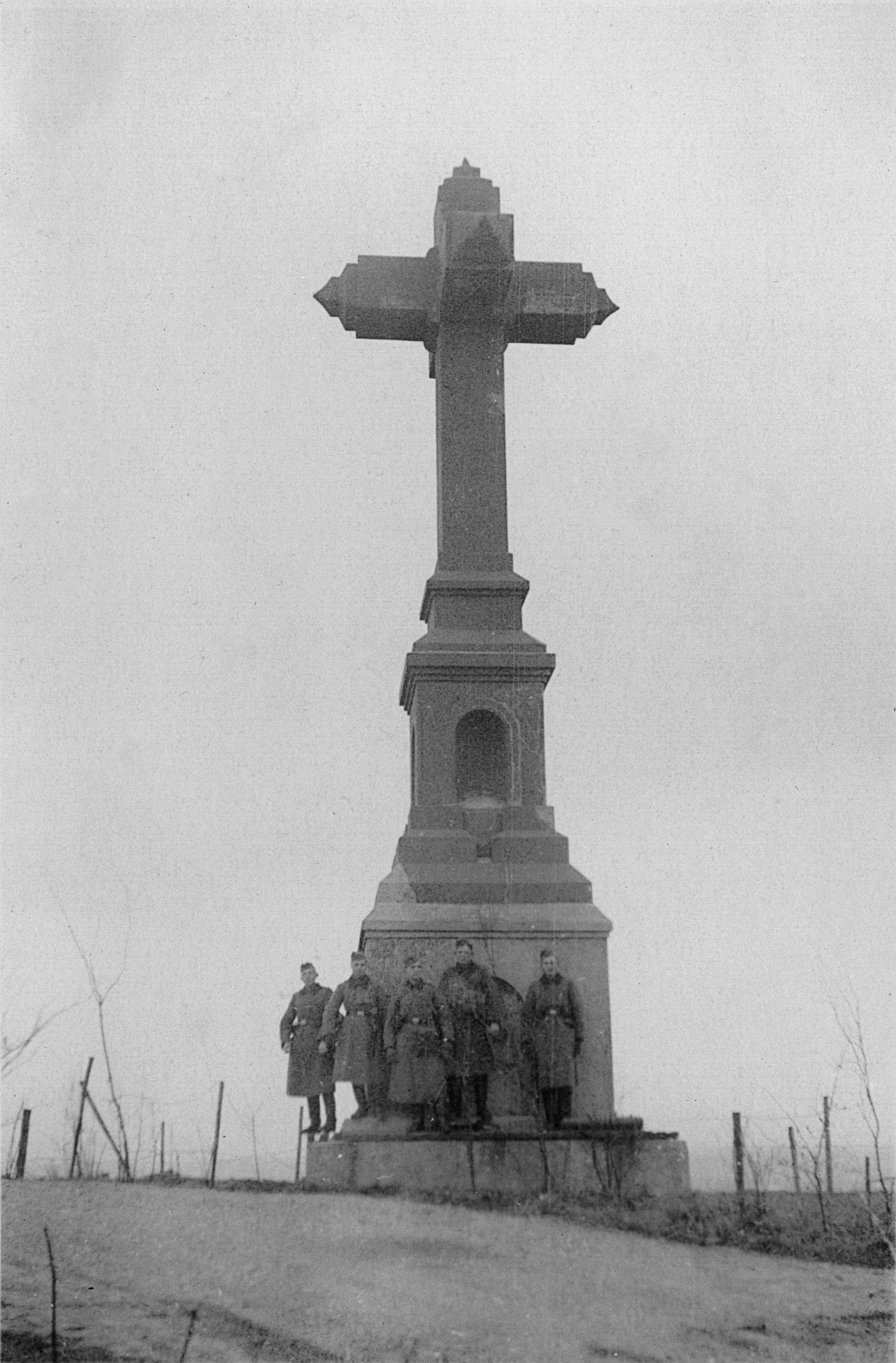
- German soldiers on the hill.
Date	8 October 1944
Location	50°47′57.63″N 6°8′21.9″E; Aachen, Germany
Result	American victory

Belligerents
Germany	United States

Commanders and leaders
Gerhard Wilck	Henry G. Leonard, Jr.

The Battle of Crucifix Hill was a World War II battle that took place on 8 October 1944, on Crucifix Hill (Haarberg, Hill 239), next to the village of Haaren in Germany and was a part of the U.S. 1st Division's campaign to seize Aachen, Germany. The Battle of Aachen was part of the Drive to the Siegfried Line. The hill was named after a large crucifix mounted on the top of the hill. The objective of the battle was to gain control of the hill, which was laced with a maze of pillboxes and bunkers, so that the main objective of encircling Aachen could be completed. The hill was held by units of the German 246. Volksgrenadierdivision.

== Battle ==
The U.S. 18th Infantry Regiment, 1st Infantry Division, commanded by Col. George A. Smith Jr., directed its 1st Battalion (commanded by Lt. Col. Henry G. Leonard, Jr.) to take the hill employing special pillbox assault teams equipped with flamethrowers, Bangalore torpedoes, and demolition charges. A battery of tank destroyers and self-propelled guns were to provide supporting direct fire at the pillboxes.

As the leading rifle platoon of C Company assaulted the first pillbox, flanking fire from a nearby pillbox gun emplacement took the platoon in crossfire. The pinned-down soldiers also experienced an intense artillery barrage on their exposed positions. Captain Bobbie E. Brown was the company commander of C Company, a former boxer who had earned a battlefield commission in Normandy. During the onslaught of the nearby pillbox, Brown grabbed a pole charge and ran 100 yd (91 m) under enemy fire and placed the charge in the pillbox, destroying it. He did this twice more to two other pillboxes, each time successfully destroying the pillbox; only on the third one was he wounded by a mortar round.

Although he was wounded, he refused medical attention and continued up the hill. After the hill was secure, he went by himself on a reconnaissance mission to locate enemy troops beyond the hill. He deliberately drew the enemy fire to find out where enemy emplacements were. While doing this, he was wounded twice more. The information he discovered about German emplacements allowed his company to repel two German counterattacks. Only after the position was completely secure did he allow treatment for his wounds. For his actions during the Battle of Crucifix Hill, Brown received the Medal of Honor.

== Attempted recapture ==
On 12 October, two German infantry regiments attempted to retake Crucifix Hill. In fierce fighting, the Germans temporarily took control of the hill, but were dislodged by the end of the day with both regiments virtually destroyed.

== In popular culture ==
- In the 2005 video game Call of Duty 2: Big Red One, the main protagonist and his squad fight for the summit of Hill 239 in the level "Crucifix Hill". The game erroneously states that the battle occurred in September 1944 instead of its real date of October 1944.

== See also ==
- Battle of Aachen
- Battle of Hurtgen Forest
