= 339th Division =

339th Division may refer to:

- 339th Infantry Division, Wehrmacht, Germany
- 339th Rifle Division, Soviet Union

== See also ==
- List of military divisions by number
