= Arthur Holmes (disambiguation) =

Arthur Holmes (1890–1965) was a British geologist.

Arthur Holmes may also refer to:

- Arthur F. Holmes (1924–2011), philosopher
- Arthur W. Holmes (1865–1944), architect
- Arthur Holmes Jr. (born 1931), United States Army general
- Daniel Arthur Holmes, a pastor from Kansas City

== See also ==
- Arthur Holmes Howell (1872–1940), zoologist
