= Peter Körte =

- Born: 26 June 1896; Berlin
- Died: 13 January 1947 (aged 50)
- Military career
- Allegiance: Nazi Germany
- Branch: Army (Wehrmacht)
- Rank: Generalmajor
- Commands: 246th Volksgrenadier Division
- Conflicts: World War II
- Awards: Knight's Cross of the Iron Cross

Peter Körte (26 June 1896 – 13 January 1947) was a general in the Wehrmacht of Nazi Germany during World War II. He was a recipient of the Knight's Cross of the Iron Cross.

== Awards and decorations ==
- Knight's Cross of the Iron Cross on 27 July 1943 as Oberst and commander of Füsilier-Regiment 26

== Notes ==
Military offices
Preceded by Oberst Gerhard Wilck	Commander of 246. Volksgrenadier-Division; 7 November 1944 – 2 January 1945	Succeeded by Generalmajor Dr. Walter Kühn
