= General Lindemann =

General Lindemann may refer to:

- Fritz Lindemann (1894–1944), German Wehrmacht general of the artillery
- Georg Lindemann (1884–1963), German Wehrmacht colonel general
- Gerhard Lindemann (1896–1994), German Wehrmacht major general
