= Siegmund Freiherr von Schleinitz =

WW2 German Army general (1890-1968)

- Born: 23 July 1890
- Died: 30 November 1968 (aged 78)
- Military career
- Allegiance: Nazi Germany
- Branch: Army
- Service years: 1909–1945
- Rank: Generalleutnant
- Commands: 9th Infantry Division; 361st Infantry Division
- Conflicts: East Pomeranian Offensive
- Awards: Knight's Cross of the Iron Cross

Siegmund Freiherr von Schleinitz (23 July 1890 – 30 November 1968) was a German general in the Wehrmacht during World War II. He was a recipient of the Knight's Cross of the Iron Cross of Nazi Germany.

Schleinitz surrendered to the Red Army in the course of the Soviet 1945 East Pomeranian Offensive. Convicted as a war criminal in the Soviet Union, he was held until 1955.

== Awards ==
- German Cross in Gold (26 December 1941)
- Knight's Cross of the Iron Cross on 14 August 1943 as Generalleutnant and commander of 9th Infantry Division

Military offices
Preceded by Generalleutnant Erwin Vierow	Commander of 9th Infantry Division; 1 January 1941 – 19 August 1943	Succeeded by Generalleutnant Friedrich Hofmann
Preceded by None	Commander of 361st Infantry Division; 20 November 1943 – 30 May 1944	Succeeded by Generalmajor Gerhard Lindemann
Preceded by Generalleutnant Richard Stenzel	Commander of Division Nr. 402; 1 October 1944 – March 1945	Succeeded by None
