= Gustav Hundt =

German general and Knight's Cross recipient (1894–?)

- Born: 27 September 1894
- Died: 21 April 1945 (aged 50); MIA near Opava, Czechoslovakia
- Military career
- Allegiance: Nazi Germany
- Branch: Army (Wehrmacht)
- Rank: Generalleutnant
- Commands: 304th Infantry Division; 1st Ski Division
- Conflicts: World War II
- Awards: Knight's Cross of the Iron Cross

Gustav Hundt (27 September 1894 – MIA 21 April 1945) was a general in the Wehrmacht of Nazi Germany during World War II who commanded several divisions. He was a recipient of the Knight's Cross of the Iron Cross. Hundt disappeared near Opava, Czechoslovakia on 21 April 1945. He was officially declared dead on 7 June 1950 with the date of presumed death being 21 April 1945.

== Awards and decorations ==
- German Cross in Gold on 15 December 1941 as Oberstleutnant in Artillerie-Regiment 30
- Knight's Cross of the Iron Cross on 15 April 1945 as Generalleutnant and commander of 1. Ski-Jäger-Division

== See also ==
- List of people who disappeared

Military offices
Preceded by Generalleutnant Ernst Sieler	Commander of 304. Infanterie-Division; 8 May 1944 – 9 August 1944	Succeeded by Generalleutnant Ernst Sieler
Preceded by Generalmajor Martin Berg	Commander of 1. Skijäger-Division; 3 October 1944 – 15 November 1944	Succeeded by Oberst Emmanuel von Kiliani
Preceded by Oberst Emmanuel von Kiliani	Commander of 1. Skijäger-Division; December 1944 – 24 April 1945	Succeeded by Oberst Henze
