= Martin Berg =

German general and Knight's Cross recipient

- Born: 4 April 1905
- Died: 2 April 1969 (aged 63)
- Military career
- Allegiance: Nazi Germany
- Branch: Army
- Service years: 1935–45
- Rank: Generalmajor
- Commands: 1st Ski Division; 207th Infantry Division
- Conflicts: World War II: Invasion of Poland; Battle of France; Operation Barbarossa; Battle of Białystok–Minsk; Battle of Smolensk (1941); Battle of Moscow; Lower Dnieper Offensive; Battle of Kiev (1943)
- Awards: Knight's Cross of the Iron Cross

Martin Berg (4 April 1905 – 2 April 1969) was a German general in the Wehrmacht of Nazi Germany during World War II. He was a recipient of the Knight's Cross of the Iron Cross.

== Awards and decorations ==
- German Cross in Gold on 21 February 1942 as Major in the II./Infanterie-Regiment 82
- Knight's Cross of the Iron Cross on 30 December 1943 as Oberst and commander of Grenadier-Regiment 166

Military offices
Preceded by Generalleutnant Gustav Hundt	Commander of 1. Skijäger-Division; 5 June 1944 – 2 August 1944	Succeeded by Generalleutnant Gustav Hundt
Preceded by Generalleutnant Bogislav Graf von Schwerin	Commander of 207. Sicherungs-Division; 17 September 1944 – 10 December 1944	Succeeded by None
