= 207th Security Division =

207. Sicherungs Division; 207th Security Division
- 207th Sicherungs Division Vehicle Insignia
- Active: August 1939-December 1944
- Country: Nazi Germany
- Branch: Army
- Type: Infantry
- Role: Rear security
- Size: Division
- Engagements: World War II

The 207th Infantry Division (German: 207. Infanterie-Division) was established in August 1939, and acted as a border security unit during the invasion of Poland as part of the Fourth Army under Army Group North. In May 1940 during the invasion of the Netherlands it attacked the Grebbe Line and was part of 18th Army. In June 1940 it was transferred to the OKH's Reserve Army. In July it was transferred to Pomerania, and in August it was disbanded and its elements used to create three security divisions: the 207th, the 281st, and the 285th, in preparation for Operation Barbarossa, the invasion of the Soviet Union.

The 207th Security Division (207. Sicherungs-Division) was subordinated to the Army Group North Rear Area until December 1944, when it was disbanded. Its headquarters staff continued as a "special purpose" (German z.b.V.) divisional headquarters under the Sixteenth Army, ending the war in the pocket with Army Group Courland.

== Commanders ==
- Generalleutnant Karl von Tiedemann (? August 1939 – 1 January 1943)
- Generalleutnant Erich Hofmann (1 January 1943 – ? November 1943)
- Generalleutnant Bogislav Graf von Schwerin, (? November 1943 – 17 September 1944)
- Generalmajor Martin Berg (17 September 1944 – 10 December 1944)
