= Alfred Philippi =

German general and Knight's Cross recipient

- Born: 3 August 1903
- Died: 15 June 1994 (aged 90)
- Military career
- Allegiance: Germany
- Branch: German Army
- Rank: Generalmajor
- Commands: 304th Infantry Division (de); 361st Volksgrenadier Division
- Conflicts: Invasion of Poland; Battle of the Caucasus; Dnieper–Carpathian Offensive; First Jassy–Kishinev Offensive; Operation Nordwind; Battle of Otterlo
- Awards: Knight's Cross of the Iron Cross

Alfred Philippi (3 August 1903 – 15 June 1994) was a German general during World War II. He was a recipient of the Knight's Cross of the Iron Cross.

== Awards and decorations ==
- Knight's Cross of the Iron Cross on 14 May 1944 as Oberst and commander of 535th Grenadier Regiment

== Writings ==
- 361st Volks Grenadier Division (24 Dec.1944-12 Jan. 1945). Attack in northern Alsace (Operation Northwind. 63 pp, 7 illus; 1947.

== Editor ==
(together with Generalleutnant Ferdinand Heim): Der Feldzug gegen Sowjetrussland 1941 bis 1945: Ein operativer Überblick, 1962.

Military offices
Preceded by Generalmajor Ernst Sieler	Commander of 304th Infantry Division; 1 February 1943 – 1 March 1943	Succeeded by Generalmajor Ernst Sieler
Preceded by Generalmajor Gerhard Lindemann	Commander of 361st Volksgrenadier Division; 23 August 1944 – February 1945	Succeeded by None
