= Wolfgang Lange (general) =

WW2 German Army general (1898-1988)

- Born: 1 June 1898
- Died: 10 February 1988 (aged 89)
- Military career
- Allegiance: Nazi Germany
- Branch: Army (Wehrmacht)
- Rank: Generalleutnant
- Commands: 564. Volksgrenadier-Division; 183. Volksgrenadier-Division
- Conflicts: World War II
- Awards: Knight's Cross of the Iron Cross

Wolfgang Lange (1 June 1898 – 10 February 1988) was a German general during World War II. He was a recipient of the Knight's Cross of the Iron Cross. Lange surrendered to the American troops on 15 April 1945 in the Ruhr Pocket.

== Awards and decorations ==
- Knight's Cross of the Iron Cross on 14 May 1944 as Generalmajor and commander of Korpsabteilung C

Military offices
Preceded by Generalmajor Martin Ronicke	Commander of 339. Infanterie-Division; 1 October 1943 – 15 November 1943	Succeeded by Remnants formed into Korps-Abteilung C
Preceded by Generalleutnant August Dettling	Commander of Korps-Abteilung C 15 November 1943 – April 1944	Succeeded by Oberst Gerhard Lindemann
Preceded by Oberst Gerhard Lindemann	Commander of Korps-Abteilung C 1 June 1944 – 27 July 1944	Succeeded by None
Preceded by Formed from 564. Grenadier-Division	Commander of 564. Volksgrenadier-Division; 1 September 1944 – 15 September 1944	Succeeded by Absorbed into 183. Volksgrenadier-Division
Preceded by Absorbed 564. Volksgrenadier-Division	Commander of 183. Volksgrenadier-Division; 15 September 1944 – 25 February 1945	Succeeded by Generalmajor Hinrich Warrelmann
