= 339th Infantry Division =

- German: 339. Infanterie-Division
- Active: 1940-1943
- Country: Nazi Germany
- Branch: Army
- Type: Infantry
- Size: Division
- Engagements: Battles of Rzhev; Battle of Kursk; Battle of the Dnieper

The 339th Infantry Division was a German military unit which fought during World War II.

== History ==
The 339th Infantry Division was created in December 1940 as an infantry division of the 14th Aufstellungswelle in military district IX in Thuringia. In May 1941 it was moved to the border with the Soviet Union. After Operation Barbarossa, the 339th ID was deployed in August 1941 in the rear area of Army Group Center near Vitebsk and Bobruisk in Belarus.

From January 1942 to January 1943, the 339th ID fought in the Battles of Rzhev with the 2nd Panzer Army around Bryansk. In Summer 1943, the Division fought in the Battle of Kursk, still as part of the 2nd Panzer Army, under the LV Army Corps.

In October 1943, the Division became part of the 4th Panzer Army under Army Group South. On 2 November 1943, after suffering heavy losses in the Battle of the Dnieper, the remnants of the 339th ID formed Divisions-Gruppe 339 and was combined with the remains of other divisions to form Korps-Abteilung C. The 339th ID itself was disbanded.

== Commanders ==
- Generalleutnant Georg Hewelke (15 December 1940 - January 1942) - died of a heart attack
- Generalleutnant Kurt Pflugradt (January - 8 December 1942)
- Generalmajor Martin Ronicke (8 December 1942 - 1 October 1943)
- Generalmajor Wolfgang Lange (1 October 1943 – 15 November 1943)

== Sources ==
- Axis History
- Lexikon der Wehrmacht
- Georg Tessin: Verbände und Truppen der deutschen Wehrmacht und Waffen-SS im Zweiten Weltkrieg 1939–1945. Band 9. Die Landstreitkräfte 281 – 370. Biblio-Verlag, Bissendorf 1974, ISBN 3-7648-1174-9.
