= Heinrich Krampf =

- Born: 1 September 1888
- Died: 16 November 1963 (aged 75)
- Military career
- Allegiance: German Empire; Weimar Republic; Nazi Germany
- Branch: Army
- Rank: Generalleutnant
- Commands: 16th Infantry Division
- Conflicts: World War II

Heinrich Krampf (1 September 1888 – 16 November 1963) was commander of the 16th Infantry Division and the 304. Infanterie-Division during World War II.

Military offices
Preceded by Generalleutnant Gotthard Heinrici	Commander of 16. Infanterie-Division; 1 February 1940 – 1 June 1940	Succeeded by Generaloberst Hans-Valentin Hube
Preceded by None	Commander of 304. Infanterie-Division; 15 November 1940 – 16 November 1942	Succeeded by Generalleutnant Ernst Sieler
