= 49th Infantry Division (Wehrmacht) =

- German: 49. Infanterie Division
- Active: 1 February – 23 November 1944
- Country: Nazi Germany
- Branch: German Army
- Type: Infantry
- Size: Division
- Part of: LXXXII Army Corps
- Engagements: Operation Overlord

The 49th Infantry Division (German: 49. Infanterie Division) was a military formation of the German Heer (Army) which served during the later years of the Second World War.

== History ==
On 1 February 1944, the 191st Reserve Division was reorganised in the Boulogne-sur-Mer area of Militärverwaltung in Belgien und Nordfrankreich (Military Administration in Belgium and Northern France). After formation the division was used for coastal defence between Boulogne-sur-Mer and Étaples. In mid-August 1944 the division was relocated to Paris and eventually back into the Low Countries, and was smashed at the Battle of Mons (near the Albert Canal) by the 21st Army Group. The divisional commander, Lt Gen Siegfried Macholz, tried to reorganise his shattered units at Hasselt, but managed to assemble only 1,500 men – mostly support troops who had no anti-tank guns and only piece of artillery: a Soviet 122 mm gun M1931/37 (A-19). Only one regimental headquarters – the 148th Grenadiers – could be located. Soon (on or about 4 September) Macholz (who had commanded the division since its formation) was replaced by Lt Gen Erich Baessler.

The division was briefly withdrawn from the line and, on 19 October 1944, absorbed the 31st and 57th Fortress Machine Gun Battalions, the 302nd and 505th Infantry Regiments (from HQ Oberkommando der Wehrmacht), the 1423rd Fortress Infantry Battalion, a grenadier replacement and training battalion, and the I, VI, XI, and XVIII Landwehr Fortress Battalions.

The division was soon back in action north of Aachen, but was withdrawn after the city fell and was disbanded shortly afterwards (on 23 November 1944). The survivors of the division were sent to the 246th Volksgrenadier Division, while the divisional staff was sent to Metz and used to form the Staff of VII Panzer Corps.

== Organisation ==
The organisation of the division was as follows:

- Divisional Headquarters
- 149th Signal Battalion
- 148th Grenadier Regiment
- 149th Grenadier Regiment
- 150th Grenadier Regiment
- 49th Füsilier Battalion
- 149th Artillery Regiment
- 149th Panzerjäger Battalion
- 149th Engineer Battalion
- 149th Divisional Supply Troops

== Commanders ==
Commanders of the division were:

- 1 February–4 September 1944: General der Infanterie Siegfried Macholz
- 4 September–23 November 1944: General der Infanterie Erich Baessler
