= Siegfried von Waldenburg =

German Wehrmacht general (1898–1973)

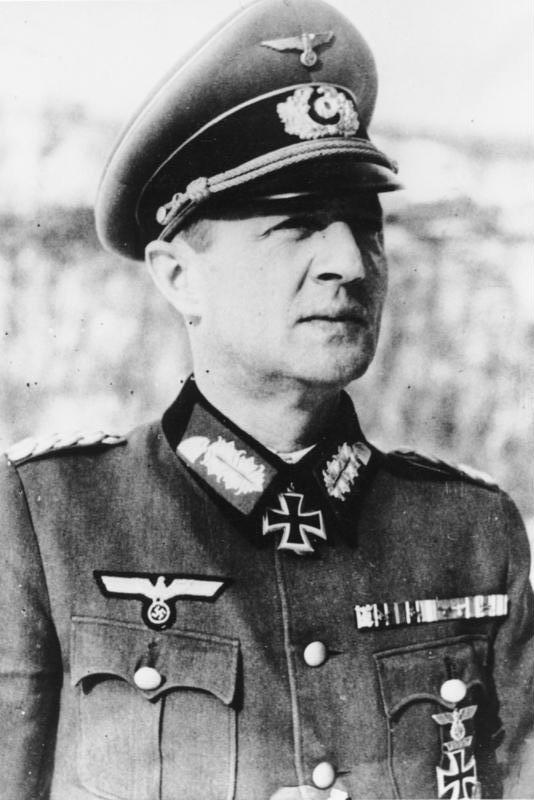
- Born: 30 December 1898; Groß-Leipe near Obernigk, Kreis Trebnitz, Regierungsbezirk Breslau, Province of Silesia, Kingdom of Prussia, German Empire
- Died: 27 March 1973 (aged 74); Hanover, Lower Saxony, West Germany
- Relatives: ∞ 1924 Jutta Hertha Luise von Alten, 4 children
- Military career
- Allegiance: German Empire; Weimar Republic; Nazi Germany
- Branch: Imperial German Army; Freikorps; Reichswehr; Army
- Service years: 1916–45
- Rank: Generalmajor
- Commands: 116th Panzer Division
- Conflicts: World War I Silesian Uprisings; World War II: Battle of France; Operation Barbarossa; Battle of Brest (1941); Battle of Białystok–Minsk; Battle of Moscow; Italian Campaign; Battle of Hürtgen Forest; Battle of the Bulge
- Awards: Knight's Cross of the Iron Cross

Hans Siegfried Paul Günther von Waldenburg (30 December 1898 – 27 March 1973) was a general in the Wehrmacht of Nazi Germany during World War II who commanded the 116th Panzer Division. He was a recipient of the Knight's Cross of the Iron Cross.

== Promotions ==
- 15 July 1916 Fahnenjunker (Officer Candidate)
- 19 August 1916 Fahnenjunker-Gefreiter (Officer Candidate with Lance Corporal rank)
- 9 September 1916 Fahnenjunker-Unteroffizier (Officer Candidate with Corporal/NCO/Junior Sergeant rank)
- 28 February 1917 Fähnrich (Officer Cadet)
- 30 July 1917 Leutnant (2nd Lieutenant) without Patent
  - 9 October with effect from 1 November 1922 received Rank Seniority (RDA) from 1 June 1919
- 1 February 1926 Oberleutnant (1st Lieutenant)
  - 13 July 1928 received new Rank Seniority (RDA) from 1 April 1925
- 1 May 1933 Rittmeister
  - 1 October 1933 renamed Hauptmann (Captain) when transferred to General Staff Training
- 2 October 1936 Major with effect and RDA from 1 October 1936
- 20 March 1939 Oberstleutnant (Lieutenant Colonel) with effect and RDA from 1 April 1939
- 18 January 1942 Oberst (Colonel) with effect and RDA from 1 February 1942
- 15 December 1944 Generalmajor (Major General) with effect and RDA from 1 December 1944

== Awards and decorations (excerpt) ==
- Iron Cross (1914), 2nd and 1st Class
  - 2nd Class on 13 July 1917
  - 1st Class on 1 January 1920
- Wound Badge (1918) in Silver
- Silesian Eagle, 2nd and 1st Grade
- Honour Cross of the World War 1914/1918 with Swords on 9 January 1935
- Wehrmacht Long Service Award, 4th to 2nd Class
- West Wall Medal
- Repetition Clasp 1939 to the Iron Cross 1914, 2nd and 1st Class
  - 2nd Class on 28 October 1939
  - 1st Class on 10 June 1940
- Eastern Medal on 8 July 1942
- Panzer Badge in Silver
- Hungarian Order of Merit, Commander's Cross with Swords on 9 November 1942
- War Merit Cross (1939), 2nd and 1st Class with Swords on 14 December 1943
- Certificate of Recognition of the Commander-in-Chief of the Army
- Knight's Cross of the Iron Cross on 9 December 1944 as Oberst and leader of the 116. Panzer-Division

Military offices
Preceded by Oberstleutnant i.G. Ferdinand Jodl	Chief of General Staff of XII. Armeekorps; 25 October 1940 – 3 March 1942	Succeeded by Oberst i.G. Kurt Lottner
Preceded by Oberst Heinrich Voigtsberger	Commander of 116. Panzer-Division; 14 September 1944 – April 1945	Succeeded by None
