= Heinrich Voigtsberger =

- Born: 10 February 1903
- Died: 17 March 1959 (aged 56)
- Military career
- Allegiance: Weimar Republic; Nazi Germany
- Branch: Army
- Service years: 1922–45
- Rank: Generalmajor
- Commands: 116th Panzer Division; 309. Infanterie-Division
- Conflicts: World War II
- Awards: Knight's Cross of the Iron Cross with Oak Leaves

Heinrich Paul Hermann Voigtsberger (10 February 1903 – 17 March 1959) was a German general (Generalmajor) in the Wehrmacht during World War II. He was a recipient of the Knight's Cross of the Iron Cross with Oak Leaves of Nazi Germany. Voigtsberger surrendered to the British forces in May 1945 and was released in 1947.

== Awards and decorations ==
- Iron Cross (1939) 2nd Class (20 February 1940) & 1st Class (21 April 1941)
- Knight's Cross of the Iron Cross with Oak Leaves
  - Knight's Cross on 9 July 1941 as Major and commander of MG-Bataillon 2
  - 351st Oak Leaves on 9 December 1943 as Oberst and commander of Grenadier-Regiment 60 (mot.)

Military offices
Preceded by Generalleutnat Gerhard Graf von Schwerin	Commander of 116. Panzer-Division; 15 September 1944 – 19 September 1944	Succeeded by Generalmajor Siegfried von Waldenburg
Preceded by None	Commander of 309. Infanterie-Division; 1 February 1945 – 8 May 1945	Succeeded by None
