= Josef Rintelen =

- Born: 7 March 1897; Esch, German Empire
- Died: 14 July 1981 (aged 84); Hamburg, West Germany
- Military career
- Allegiance: Nazi Germany
- Branch: Army (Wehrmacht)
- Rank: Generalleutnant
- Commands: 357. Infanterie-Division
- Conflicts: World War I World War II
- Awards: Knight's Cross of the Iron Cross

Josef Rintelen (7 March 1897 – 14 July 1981) was a German general during World War II. He was a recipient of the Knight's Cross of the Iron Cross of Nazi Germany.

== Awards and decorations ==
- Knight's Cross of the Iron Cross on 5 August 1940 as Oberstleutnant and commander of I./Infanterie-Regiment 478

Military offices
Preceded by Generalmajor Norbert Holm	Commander of 357. Infanterie-Division; 12 September 1944 – 8 May 1945	Succeeded by None
