= Hinrich Warrelmann =

WW2 German Army general (1904-1980)

- Born: 16 April 1904; Oldenburg, German Empire
- Died: 9 October 1980 (aged 76); Westerkappeln, West Germany
- Military career
- Allegiance: Weimar Republic (1921–1933); Nazi Germany
- Branch: Army (Wehrmacht)
- Service years: 1921–45
- Rank: Generalmajor
- Commands: 179th Infantry Division; 183rd Volksgrenadier Division
- Conflicts: World War II
- Awards: Knight's Cross of the Iron Cross with Oak Leaves

Hinrich Warrelmann (16 April 1904 – 9 October 1980) was a German general during World War II. He was a recipient of the Knight's Cross of the Iron Cross with Oak Leaves of Nazi Germany.

== Awards and decorations ==
- Iron Cross (1939) 2nd Class (21 September 1939) & 1st Class (13 June 1940)
- German Cross in Gold on 28 February 1942 as Major in MG-Bataillon 2
- Knight's Cross of the Iron Cross with Oak Leaves
  - Knight's Cross on 16 April 1944 as Oberst and commander of Grenadier-Regiment 502
  - Oak Leaves on 19 August 1944 as Oberst and commander of Grenadier-Regiment 502

Military offices
Preceded by Wolfgang Lange	Commander of 183. Volksgrenadier-Division; 25 February 1945 - 8 May 1945	Succeeded by None
