= 183rd Volksgrenadier Division =

- German: 183. Volksgrenadier-Division
- 183. Volksgrenadier Division Vehicle Insignia
- Active: 15 September 1944 – 8 May 1945
- Country: Nazi Germany
- Branch: Army
- Type: Infantry
- Size: Division
- Engagements: World War II

The 183rd Volksgrenadier Division (German: 183. Volksgrenadier-Division) was a German unit during World War II.

== History ==
In September 1944 the 183 Volksgrenadier Division was formed of what was left of the 183rd Infantry Division, complemented by non-fighting military personnel (from navy and air force) and civilians. The 183rd Infantry Division had come into existence on 15 September 1944, having been formed from the so-called Schatten-Division Döllersheim.

At the end of November Grenadier-Regiment 330 was destroyed at Geilenkirchen during a massive allied offensive against the German positions between the rivers Wurm and Rur, between Geilenkirchen and Linnich. Aim of the Ninth US Army was the Rur crossing at Linnich, which would open the way to Cologne. The offensive was called Operation Queen and was launched on 16 November. The 330th Infantry Regiment of the 183rd Volksgrenadier Division was holding the front line at Floverich, Loverich and Setterich, where the Americans attacked with the 2nd Armored Division. During the afternoon 330th Regiment was virtually wiped out, more than five hundred "grenadiers" being captured from the regiment's possible strength of one thousand men. The total killed and wounded could not be estimated but it is believed that not over 250 men remained in the unit.

The offensive would eventually last until mid-December, which the Germans called "the third battle of Aachen" (Dritte Schlacht um Aachen) . In this period the German units in the area counterattacked continuously. By 21 November, after five days of serious combat, the number of casualties within 183 Volksgrenadier Division had risen beyond an acceptable level, and the division was unable to continue fighting as an independent unit. Remaining troops of the 183rd were divided among the other German divisions, the 9th Panzer Division and 15th Panzergrenadier Division that were present in the area east of Geilenkirchen.

== Organisation ==
The 183rd Division included Grenadier Regiments 330, 343 and 351, each of two battalions, as well as Artillery Regiment 219, consisting of four battalions. The composition of the division was enhanced on 19 October 1944 by the absorption of the XVI Landwehr-Festungs-Battalion and Festungs-MG-Battalion 42. Part of the division was made up of raw and ill-trained Austrians.

== Commanders ==
The 183 Volksgrenadier Division was under command of Generalmajor Wolfgang Lange since 15 September 1944. Lange also commanded the 49 Infanterie Division during their actions in the battle of Aachen. He received the Knight's Cross (Ritterkreuz) on 14 May 1944.

On 25 February 1945 command of the 183 Volksgrenadier Division was taken over by Generalmajor Hinrich Warrelmann.

== Footnotes ==
- Tessin, Georg (1973). "Die Landstreitkräfte 131—200". Verbände und Truppen der deutschen Wehrmacht und Waffen SS im Zweiten Weltkrieg 1939—1945 (in German). Vol. 7. Frankfurt/Main: E.S. Mittler. pp. 219–220.
