= Alan Sieler =

Australian cricketer (born 1948)

Personal information
- Full name: Alan John Sieler
- Born: 17 July 1948 (age 78); Arncliffe, New South Wales, Australia
- Batting: Left-handed
- Bowling: Left-arm medium pace, slow left-arm orthodox
- Role: All-rounder

Domestic team information
- Years: Team
- 1970-1977: Victoria

Career statistics
| Competition | First-class | List A |
|---|---|---|
| Matches | 39 | 6 |
| Runs scored | 1801 | 141 |
| Batting average | 30.52 | 35.25 |
| 100s/50s | 4/6 | 0/1 |
| Top score | 157 | 68* |
| Balls bowled | 3890 | 251 |
| Wickets | 41 | 8 |
| Bowling average | 35.39 | 20.50 |
| 5 wickets in innings | 0 | 0 |
| 10 wickets in match | 0 | n/a |
| Best bowling | 4/28 | 3/29 |
| Catches/stumpings | 26/– | 2/– |
- Source: Cricinfo, 5 December 2015

Alan John Sieler (born 17 July 1948) is an Australian former cricketer. A left-handed all-rounder, he played 39 first-class cricket matches for Victoria between 1970 and 1977. In the opening match of the Sheffield Shield in 1973–74 against Queensland, Sieler scored 157 and 105, sharing in fifth-wicket partnerships of 271 and 184 with Robert Rose.

== See also ==
- List of Victoria first-class cricketers
