= 183rd Infantry Division (Wehrmacht) =

- 183. Infanterie-Division
- Active: November 1939 - November 1943
- Country: Nazi Germany
- Branch: Army
- Type: Infantry
- Size: Division
- Engagements: World War II

The 183rd Infantry Division was a German infantry division in World War II.

== History ==
The division was formed during the 7th Aufstellungswelle on 28 November 1939 in Gutsbezirk Münsingen (Wurttemberg).
It participated in the French campaign in 1940 and was then relocated to the Protectorate of Bohemia and Moravia after which it participated in the invasion of Yugoslavia..
In June 1941, it participated in the attack on the USSR, as part of the XX Army Corps under the command of Friedrich Materna. The Division fought near Smolensk and Moscow. By 22 October 1943, the 183rd Infantry Division had suffered numerous losses and was merged with two other, badly battered Infantry Divisions (217th and 339th) into a "Corps Detachment C" (Korps-Abteilung C). The division itself was disbanded.

Corps Detachment C became part of Army Group North Ukraine. In July 1944, it was destroyed in the Brody Pocket.
On 15 September 1944, a new 183rd Volksgrenadier Division was created.

== Organization ==
Structure of the division:

- Headquarters
- 219th Reconnaissance Battalion
- 330th Infantry Regiment
- 343rd Infantry Regiment
- 351st Infantry Regiment
- 219th Engineer Battalion
- 219th Artillery Regiment
- 219th Tank Destroyer Battalion
- 219th Signal Battalion
- 219th Divisional Supply Group

== Commanders ==
- Generalleutnant Benignus Dippold (1 November 1939 - 4 October 1941)
- Generalleutnant Richard Stempel (4 October 1941 - 20 January 1942)
- Generalleutnant August Dettling (20 January 1942 - 15 November 1943)
- Generalleutnant Wolfgang Lange (Korps-Abteilung C) (15 November 1943 - April 1944)
- Oberst Gerhard Lindemann (Korps-Abteilung C) (April 1944 - 1 June 1944)
- Generalleutnant Wolfgang Lange (Korps-Abteilung C) (1 June 1944 - 27 July 1944)
- Generalleutnant Wolfgang Lange (183rd Volksgrenadier Division) (15 September 1944 - 25 February 1945)
- Generalmajor Hinrich Warrelmann (183rd Volksgrenadier Division) (25 February 1945 - 8 May 1945).
