= 361st Infantry Division =

WW2 German Army military unit

361st Infantry Division 361st Volksgrenadier Division
- German: 361. Infanterie-Division; 361. Volksgrenadier-Division
- Active: 1943 – 1945
- Country: Nazi Germany
- Branch: Army
- Type: Infantry (1943 – 1944); Volksgrenadier (1944 – 1945)
- Size: Division
- Engagements: Second World War

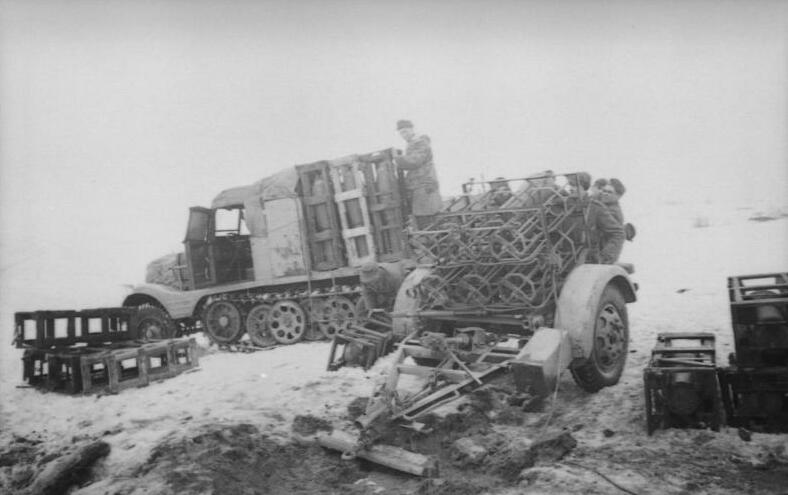
January 1944 on the Russian front. Soldiers unload ammunition from a light ammunition transport vehicle (Zugkraftwagen 3t (Sd.Kfz. 11)) for a 28/32cm caliber Nebelwerfer.

The 361st Infantry Division (German: 361. Infanterie-Division) was an infantry division of the German Army during the Second World War, active from 1943 to 1945. It was redesignated as a Volksgrenadier division in 1944. It saw active service on the Eastern Front when the Soviets launched Operation Bagration, during which it suffered significant losses. It later fought in France before being absorbed by the 559th Volksgrenadier Division (de) on 10 March 1945.

== Operational history ==
The 361st Infantry Division was formed in Denmark during the period from October to November 1943, and formally established on 26 November under the command of Generalleutnant (Note: The rank of generalleutnant is equivalent to that of major general in the United States Army.) Siegmund Freiherr von Schleinitz. The division nominally fell within the responsibility of Wehrkreis VI. At its core were remnants of the 86th Infantry Division, which had been disbanded due to significant losses incurred during fighting on the Eastern Front. Three battalions of infantry also came from the 94th and 137th Infantry Divisions, as well as the 141st Reserve Division. (Note: The 141st Reserve Division trained replacement units for Wehrkreis I divisions.)

The division was dispatched to the Eastern Front in March 1944 and the following month became involved in the fighting in the Kamenets-Podolsky pocket. In the summer of 1944, the Soviet forces launched Operation Bagration and, as part of XIII Army Corps, it incurred casualties during this time. It, along with the rest of XIII Army Corps, became encircled at Brody and was trapped. While some personnel were able to fight their way out, its commander, Generalleutnant Gerhard Lindemann, and most of his men became prisoners of war. What was left of the division retreated into Poland and it was transferred to Germany for a rest and refit.

Now under the command of Oberst (Note: The rank of oberst is equivalent to that of colonel in the United States Army.) Alfred Philippi, it received reinforcements from, among others, the 569th Volksgrenadier Division. It was now designated as a Volksgrenadier division and returned to action in the Arnhem sector. It was shifted to eastern France and then in the Vosges Mountains where it took on troops from the 553rd Volksgrenadier Division. The division ceased to exist on 10 March 1945, when it was absorbed by the 559th Volksgrenadier Division.

== Commanders ==
- Generalleutnant Baron Siegmund von Schleinitz (20 November 1943 – 29 May 1944);
- Generalmajor (Note: The rank of generalmajor is equivalent to that of brigadier general in the United States Army.) Gerhard Lindemann (30 May – 31 October 1944);
- Generalmajor Alfred Philippi (Note: Philippi was promoted to generalmajor on 1 January 1945.) (1 September 1944 – 10 March 1945).

== Notes ==
Footnotes

Citations
