= Gerhard Lindemann =

Nazi general (1896–1994)

- Born: 2 August 1896; Verden an der Aller
- Died: 28 April 1994 (aged 97); Bremen
- Military career
- Allegiance: German Empire (to 1918); Weimar Republic (to 1933); Nazi Germany
- Branch: Army
- Service years: 1914–1920; 1934–1945
- Rank: Generalmajor
- Commands: 361st Infantry Division
- Conflicts: World War II: Lvov–Sandomierz Offensive (surrendered)
- Awards: Knight's Cross of the Iron Cross with Oak Leaves

Gerhard Heinrich Lindemann (2 August 1896 – 28 April 1994) was a German general (Generalmajor) in the Wehrmacht during World War II, and a recipient of the Knight's Cross of the Iron Cross with Oak Leaves, awarded by Nazi Germany for successful military leadership.

Lindemann surrendered to the Red Army in the course of the Soviet July 1944 Lvov–Sandomierz Offensive. Convicted as a war criminal in the Soviet union, he was held until 1955.

== Awards and decorations ==
- Iron Cross (1914) 2nd Class (5 October 1915) & 1st Class (25 April 1918)
- Honour Cross of the World War 1914/1918
- Clasp to the Iron Cross (1939) 2nd Class & 1st Class (10 June 1940)
- German Cross in Gold on 7 March 1942 as Oberstleutnant in 216th Infantry Regiment
- Knight's Cross of the Iron Cross with Oak Leaves
  - Knight's Cross on 25 January 1943 as Oberst and commander of 216th Infantry Regiment
  - 580th Oak Leaves on 10 September 1944 as Generalmajor and acting divisional commander of 361st Infantry Division

Military offices
| Preceded by Generalleutnant Wolfgang Lange | Commander of Korps-Abteilung C April 1944 - 30 May 1944 | Succeeded by Generalleutnant Wolfgang Lange |
| Preceded by Generalleutnant Siegmund Freiherr von Schleinitz | Commander of 361st Infantry Division; 30 May 1944 – 22 July 1944 | Succeeded by Generalmajor Alfred Philippi |
