= Bobbie E. Brown =

US Army officer and Medal of Honor recipient (1903–1971)

Robert Evan Brown Jr.
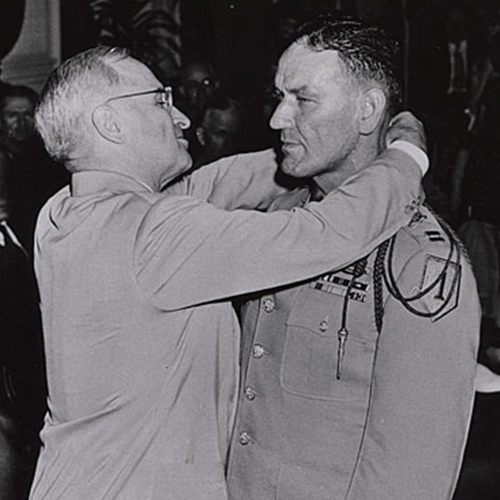
- Brown receiving Medal of Honor
- Born: September 2, 1903; Dublin, Georgia, US
- Died: November 8, 1971 (aged 68); Highland Falls, New York, US
- Burial place: Arlington National Cemetery
- Relatives: Marian G. Brown (wife)
- Military career
- Allegiance: United States
- Branch: United States Army
- Service years: 1918–1952
- Rank: Captain
- Units: Company C, 18th Infantry, 1st Infantry Division
- Conflicts: World War II
- Awards: Medal of Honor; Silver Star (2); Bronze Star Medal; Purple Heart (8)
- Other work: School Janitor

Robert Evan Brown Jr. (September 2, 1903 – November 8, 1971) was a recipient of the Medal of Honor for his actions at the Battle of Crucifix Hill, near Aachen, Germany, on October 8, 1944. He left home and joined the army in 1918, lying about his age. At the start of World War II, he was the first sergeant of the Headquarters Company of the 2nd Armored Division. He received a battlefield commission to second lieutenant and was transferred to the 1st Infantry Division in 1943. Following the death of his company commander on D-Day he assumed command of his company, Company C. Brown left the army with the rank of captain in 1952.

== Early life ==
Robert Brown was born in Dublin, Georgia, in 1903 and left home in 1918 to join the Army at age 15.

== Military career ==
At the Army recruiter's office in Columbus, he told the Sergeant he was 18. Because he filled out his first enlistment papers with his nickname "Bobbie," that was how the Army knew him for the next three decades.

He qualified as an expert with every weapon in the Army's arsenal, and took up boxing and American football. He scored 38 victories in the ring and made the all-Army team for football in 1927. Three universities offered him scholarships to play football for them before they learned he had only completed the seventh grade.

When World War II began he was the First Sergeant in the Headquarters Company of Patton's 2nd Armored Division. After fighting across North Africa, he received a battlefield promotion to Second Lieutenant and transferred to the 1st Infantry Division. He led a platoon of Company C up Omaha Beach on D-Day. While fighting across France, he assumed command of his unit when his company commander was killed.

=== Crucifix Hill ===
A few days later the promotion became official. At 04:00, October 8, 1944, he received orders for an attack on Crucifix Hill. Of 43 known pillboxes and bunkers, his company was responsible for numbers 17, 18, 19, 20, 26, 29, and 30. After a formation of P-47 Thunderbolts finished an air strike at 13:15, he led his company out of positions in a graveyard at the foot of the hill. They made it about 150 yards (140 m) to an antitank ditch in front of pillbox 18 before heavy German fire forced them to seek cover. He turned to his platoon Sergeant, "Get me a couple of flamethrowers, some pole and satchel charges." Once armed with these, he had his riflemen lay down a base of fire, then started crawling alone toward the pillbox. A bomb had earlier blown a crater near the pillbox, which he jumped into, and dropped a satchel charge through an aperture by a door. The pillbox erupted, clouds of smoke billowing from its rifle ports.

He crawled his way back to his men to pick up more charges and went back uphill 35 yards (32 m) past the still-smoking bunker and toward pillbox 19 while under heavy machine-gun fire. Several mortar rounds fell nearby, slamming his body to the ground. Once in range, he dropped a pole charge through a 12-inch (300 mm) opening, blowing a hole in the pillbox, followed with a satchel charge. On his way back downhill for more charges, he noticed blood covering one knee. Then his Sergeant told him, "Sir, there's bullet holes in your canteen." He had no idea when he'd been hit.

Pillbox 20 was perhaps the largest and most heavily armed fortification on the hill. A turret, mounting a cut-down 88 mm cannon, revolved 360 degrees on top, while the concrete walls were 6 feet (1.8 m) thick. The structure was manned by 45 soldiers with no less than 6 machine-guns. Following a communications trench 20 yards (18 m) from number 19 to 20, he threw two satchel charges through a steel door that an ammunition-laden soldier was entering through. With the destruction of pillbox 20, enemy resistance on Crucifix Hill soon crumbled, allowing allied forces to mop up and secure the 1st Division's flank.

He was wounded during street fighting in Aachen when an artillery shell landed practically beside him. Numb, blood streaming from his nose, ears, and mouth, he headed for an aid station. He spent several months in a hospital in Belgium, then went home on a 30-day leave. He rejoined Company C in Germany and fought with it into Czechoslovakia. After the war ended, he flew home to receive his Medal of Honor on August 23, 1945.

== Medal of Honor citation ==
Rank and organization: Captain, U S. Army, Company C, 18th Infantry, 1st Infantry Division. Place and date: Crucifix Hill, Aachen, Germany, October 8, 1944. Entered service at: Atlanta, Ga. Born: September 2, 1903, Dublin, Ga. G.O. No.: 74, September 1, 1945.

Citation:

He commanded Company C, 18th Infantry Regiment, on October 8, 1944, when it, with the Ranger Platoon of the 1st Battalion, attacked Crucifix Hill, a key point in the enemy's defense of Aachen, Germany. As the leading rifle platoon assaulted the first of many pillboxes studding the rising ground, heavy fire from a flanking emplacement raked it. An intense artillery barrage fell on the American troops which had been pinned down in an exposed position. Seeing that the pillboxes must be neutralized to prevent the slaughter of his men, Capt. Brown obtained a pole charge and started forward alone toward the first pillbox, about 100 yards away. Hugging the ground while enemy bullets whipped around him, he crawled and then ran toward the aperture of the fortification, rammed his explosive inside and jumped back as the pillbox and its occupants were blown up. He rejoined the assault platoon, secured another pole charge, and led the way toward the next pillbox under continuous artillery mortar, automatic, and small-arms fire. He again ran forward and placed his charge in the enemy fortification, knocking it out. He then found that fire from a third pillbox was pinning down his company; so he returned to his men, secured another charge, and began to creep and crawl toward the hostile emplacement. With heroic bravery he disregarded opposing fire and worked ahead in the face of bullets streaming from the pillbox. Finally reaching his objective, he stood up and inserted his explosive, silencing the enemy. He was wounded by a mortar shell but refused medical attention and, despite heavy hostile fire, moved swiftly among his troops exhorting and instructing them in subduing powerful opposition. Later, realizing the need for information of enemy activity beyond the hill, Capt. Brown went out alone to reconnoiter. He observed possible routes of enemy approach and several times deliberately drew enemy fire to locate gun emplacements. Twice more, on this self-imposed mission, he was wounded; but he succeeded in securing information which led to the destruction of several enemy guns and enabled his company to throw back 2 powerful counterattacks with heavy losses. Only when Company C's position was completely secure did he permit treatment of his 3 wounds. By his indomitable courage, fearless leadership, and outstanding skill as a soldier, Capt. Brown contributed in great measure to the taking of Crucifix Hill, a vital link in the American line encircling Aachen.

== Later life ==
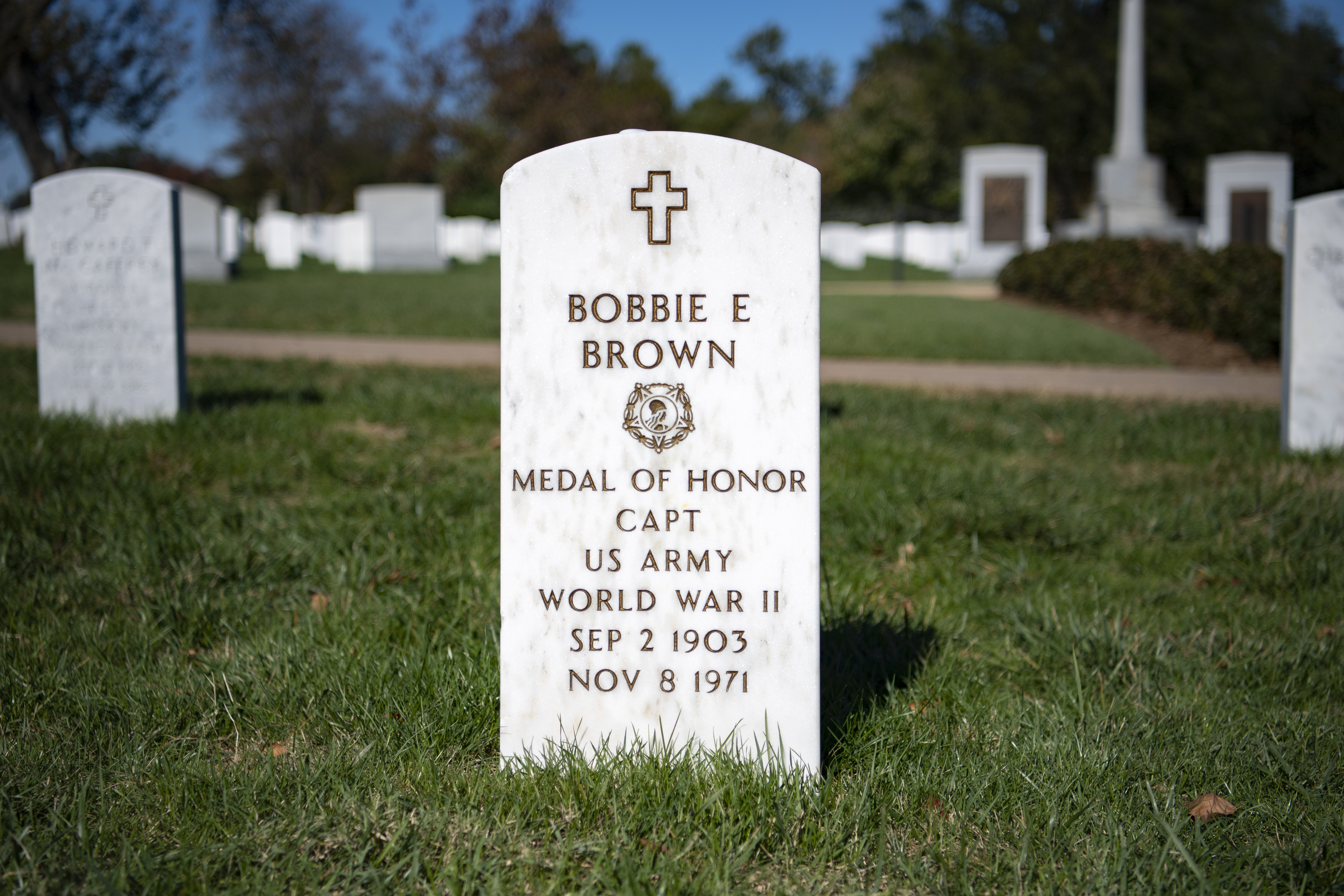
Grave of Bobbie E. Brown at Arlington National Cemetery

After the war ended, Brown spent the next two years in and out of hospitals, as Army doctors tried to repair the physical damage inflicted by 13 war wounds. He completed 34 years of service to his country in 1952.

Like so many men who had experienced intense combat, Brown was tormented by traumatic memories of his experiences during the war. Unable to find a good civilian job, he became a janitor at the United States Military Academy at West Point, New York. Haunted by unhappy memories of combat and in constant pain from war-related injuries, he committed suicide, by a self-inflicted gunshot to his chest, on November 8, 1971, in Highland Falls, New York. He was buried at Arlington National Cemetery, in Arlington, Virginia.

== See also ==
- List of Medal of Honor recipients for World War II
