= Ernst Sieler =

WW2 German Army general (1893-1983)

- Born: 22 August 1893
- Died: 6 October 1983 (aged 90)
- Military career
- Allegiance: German Empire; Weimar Republic; Nazi Germany
- Branch: Army
- Service years: 1913–1945
- Rank: Generalleutnant
- Commands: 304th Infantry Division; LIX Army Corps
- Conflicts: World War I World War II
- Awards: Knight's Cross of the Iron Cross with Oak Leaves

Ernst Sieler (22 August 1893 – 6 October 1983) was a general in the Wehrmacht of Nazi Germany during World War II who commanded the LIX. Corps. He was a recipient of the Knight's Cross of the Iron Cross with Oak Leaves. Sieler surrendered to the Soviet forces in the course of Red Army's Vistula–Oder Offensive. He was held in the Soviet Union as a war criminal until 1955.

== Awards and decorations ==
- Iron Cross (1914) 2nd Class (14 September 1914) & 1st Class (1 July 1916)
- Clasp to the Iron Cross (1939) 2nd Class (11 May 1940) & 1st Class (23 May 1940)
- German Cross in Gold on 23 February 1944 as Generalleutnant and commander of 304. Infanterie-Division
- Knight's Cross of the Iron Cross with Oak Leaves
  - Knight's Cross on 12 September 1941 as Oberst and commander of Infanterie-Regiment 46
  - 502nd Oak Leaves on 24 June 1944 as Generalleutnant and commander of 304. Infanterie-Division

Military offices
Preceded by Generalleutnant Heinrich Krampf	Commander of 304. Infanterie-Division; 16 November 1942 - 1 February 1943	Succeeded by Oberst Alfred Philippi
Preceded by Oberst Alfred Philippi	Commander of 304. Infanterie-Division; 1 March 1943 - 30 August 1943	Succeeded by Oberst Norbert Holm
Preceded by Oberst Norbert Holm	Commander of 304. Infanterie-Division; October 1943 - 8 May 1944	Succeeded by Generalmajor Gustav Hundt
Preceded by Generalmajor Gustav Hundt	Commander of 304. Infanterie-Division; 9 August 1944 - January 1945	Succeeded by Generalmajor Ulrich Liß
Preceded by Generalleutnant Joachim von Tresckow	Commander of LIX Armeekorps; 1 February 1945 - 8 May 1945	Succeeded by None
