= Arthur Holmes Jr. =

United States Army general

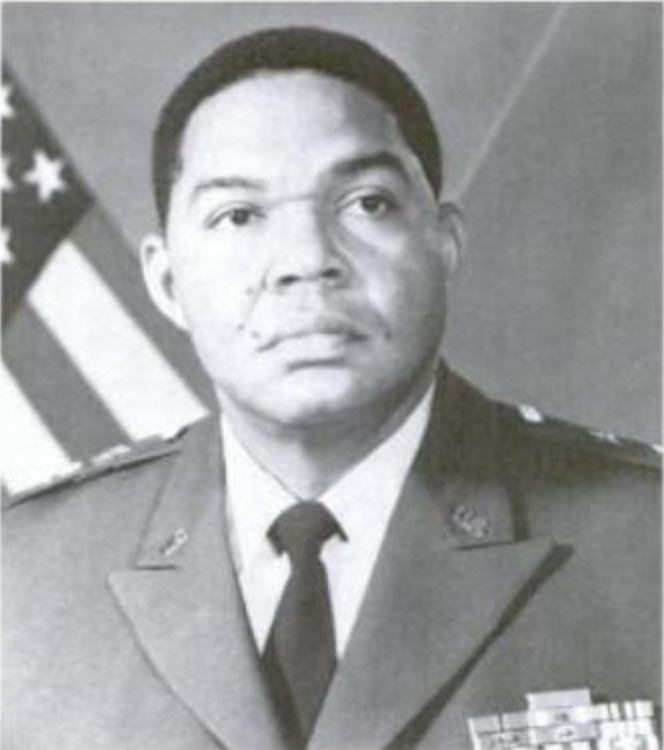
- Born: 12 May 1931 (age 95); Beverly, Massachusetts U.S.
- Military career
- Allegiance: United States
- Branch: United States Army
- Service years: 1952–1987
- Rank: Major general
- Commands: United States Army Tank-Automotive Command, Assistant Deputy Chief of Staff for Logistics
- Conflicts: Korean War, Vietnam War

Arthur Holmes Jr. (born 12 May 1931) is a retired major general in the United States Army. He served as Commanding General of the United States Army Tank-Automotive Command.
