= 246th Volksgrenadier Division =

246th Infantry Division
- 246. Infanterie-Division
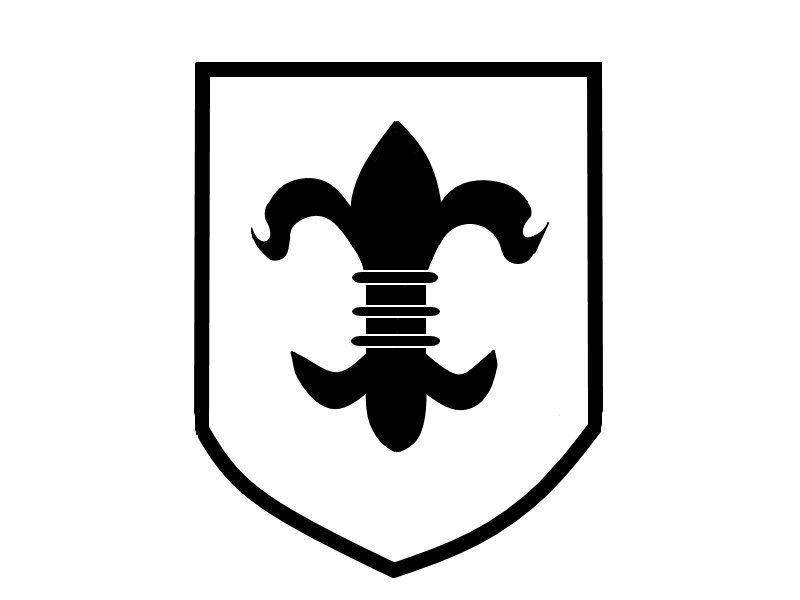
- Vehicle insignia
- Active: August 1941–May 1945
- Country: Nazi Germany
- Branch: Heer (Wehrmacht)
- Type: Infantry
- Size: Division

The 246th Infantry Division (German: 246. Infanterie-Division) was a division of the German Wehrmacht during World War II. Towards the end of the war, it was redeployed under the name 246th Volksgrenadier Division.

== Operational history ==
The 246th Infantry Division was formed in Trier (Wkr. XII) and initially stationed on the Saar Line, later in South-western France from August 1941 until January 1942. On formation, it consisted of 313th, 352nd and 404th infantry regiments; an artillery regiment; a pioneer battalion; an anti-tank battalion; a signals battalion, and other subunits. The division lacked 50mm anti-tank guns, and used trophy French vehicles.

From February 1942 to January 1943 the division served in the area of Vitebsk and was a part of the 9th Army. Most of the operations in which the division participated were in the area of Bely and south-west of it, the sector extending to Smolensk. The division's most active period was during the Winter-Spring of 1942, but from May it was transferred to the Kampfgruppe Esebeck (Generalleutenant Hans-Karl Freiherr von Esebeck), and from March in Kampfgruppe Zeidlitz. During July 1942, in cooperation with the 2nd Panzer Division it was engaged in combat with the 17th Guards and 135th Rifle Divisions and the 21st Tank Brigade.
The division was encircled and destroyed during the Vitebsk–Orsha offensive in June 1944, and its commander was taken prisoner by the Soviets.

=== 246th Volksgrenadier Division ===
On 15 September 1944, a new 246th Volksgrenadier Division (short: 246th V.G.D.) was established at the military training area Milovice northeast of Prague, by renaming the 565th Volksgrenadier Division, which had been created only 3 weeks earlier. Subsequently, the division was used in the Ardennes offensive.

== Commanders ==
=== 246th Infantry Division ===
- Generalleutnant Erich Denecke, 1 September 1939 – 13 December 1941
- Generalleutnant Maximilian Siry, 13 December 1941 – 16 May 1943
- Generalmajor Konrad von Alberti, 16 May 1943 – 12 September 1943
- Generalmajor Heinz Fiebig, 12 September 1943 – 5 October 1943
- Generalleutnant Wilhelm Falley, 5 October 1943 – 20 April 1944
- Generalmajor Claus Müller-Bülow, 20 April 1944 – 27 June 1944 (POW)

=== 246th Volksgrenadier-Division ===
- Oberst Gerhard Wilck, 15 September 1944 – November 1944
- Generalmajor Peter Körte, November 1944 – 1 January 1945
- Generalmajor Walter Kühn, 1 January 1945 – 8 May 1945
