= Norbert Holm =

- Born: 16 December 1895
- Died: 3 June 1962 (aged 66)
- Military career
- Allegiance: German Empire (to 1918); Weimar Republic (to 1933); Nazi Germany
- Branch: Army (Wehrmacht)
- Service years: 1914–1945
- Rank: Generalmajor (demoted)
- Unit: 19th Panzer Division
- Commands: 304th Infantry Division; 357 Infantry Division
- Conflicts: World War I: World War II; Invasion of Poland; Battle of France; Operation Barbarossa; Battle of Kiev (1941); Battle of the Caucasus; Lower Dnieper Offensive; Battle of the Dukla Pass; Prague Offensive
- Awards: Knight's Cross of the Iron Cross

Norbert Holm (16 December 1895 – 3 June 1962) was a general in the Wehrmacht of Nazi Germany during World War II. He was a recipient of the Knight's Cross of the Iron Cross. Following the 20 July plot, on 16 September 1944, Norbert Holm was arrested and later demoted because of his Chief of Operations' association with Field Marsal Erwin Rommel. He fought as a private in the 19th Panzer Division, and for "repeated bravery before the enemy" he was promoted to Unteroffizier in January 1945 and to Feldwebel two months before the end of the war. He was rehabilitated in 1956.

== Awards and decorations ==
- Knight's Cross of the Iron Cross on 20 December 1941 as Oberst and commander of Infanterie-Regiment 156 (mot.)

Military offices
Preceded by Generalleutnant Ernst Sieler	Commander of 304. Infanterie-Division; 30 August 1943 – October 1943	Succeeded by Generalleutnant Ernst Sieler
Preceded by Generalmajor Knut Eberding	Commander of 357. Infanterie-Division; 10 May 1944 – 12 September 1944	Succeeded by Generalleutnant Josef Rintelen
