= Gerhard Wilck =

German commander (1898–1985)

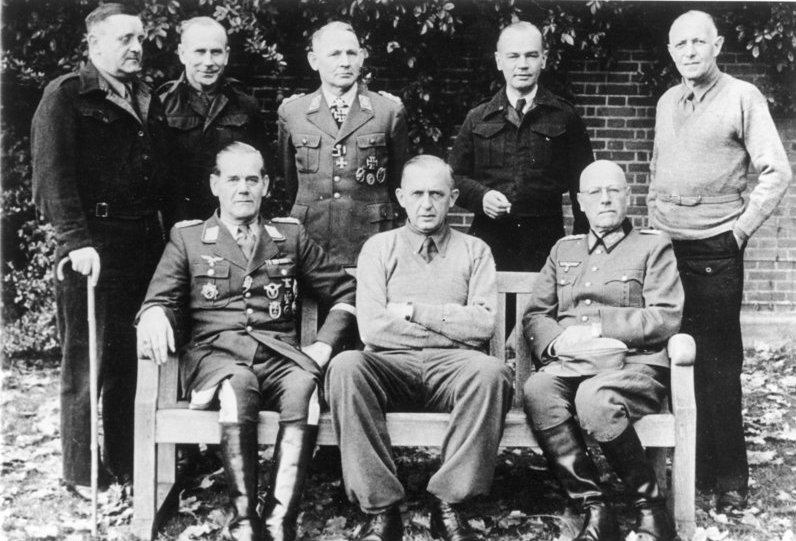
- Gerhard Wilck (standing 2nd from left) at Trent Park
- Born: 17 June 1898; Löbau, West Prussia
- Died: 5 April 1985 (aged 86); Rheinbreitbach
- Military career
- Allegiance: Nazi Germany
- Branch: Army
- Service years: 1916 – 1944
- Rank: Oberst
- Commands: 246th Volksgrenadier Division
- Conflicts: World War II; Eastern Front; Lvov–Sandomierz Offensive; Western Front; Battle of Aachen

Gerhard Wilck (17 June 1898 – 5 April 1985) was the German commander who defended the German city of Aachen in the Battle of Aachen. He surrendered on 21 October 1944 against the orders of Hitler, after a stubborn defense and bitter urban warfare.
