= Operation Queen =

1944 operation during World War II

- Part of the Allied advance from Paris to the Rhine in the Western Front of World War II
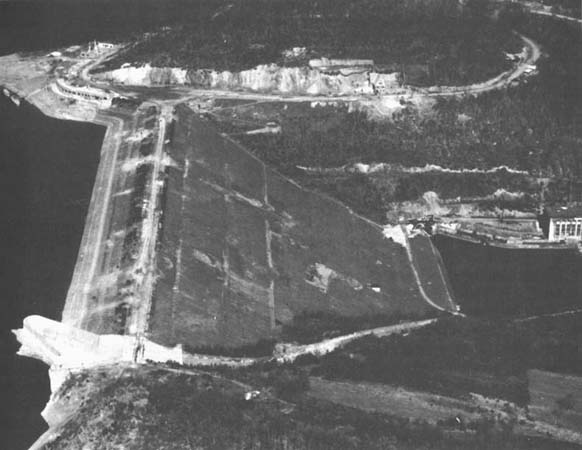
- The Schwammenauel dam on the Roer - one of the main objectives of Operation Queen
Date	16 November – 16 December 1944
Location	Roer valley and environs, Germany
Result	German defensive victory

Belligerents
United States; Air support United Kingdom	Germany

Commanders and leaders
Dwight Eisenhower; Omar Bradley; Courtney Hodges; William Hood Simpson	Gerd von Rundstedt; Walter Model; Gustav-Adolf von Zangen; Erich Brandenberger

Strength
Twelfth United States Army Group; 1st Army; 9th Army	Army Group B 7th Army; 15th Army

Casualties and losses
38,500	39,000

Operation Queen was an American operation during World War II on the Western Front at the German Siegfried Line.

The operation was aimed against the River Roer as a staging point for a subsequent thrust over the river to the Rhine into Germany. It was conducted by the First and Ninth U.S. Armies.

The offensive commenced on 16 November 1944 with one of the heaviest Allied tactical bombings of the war. However, the Allied advance was unexpectedly slow, against heavy German resistance, especially in the Hürtgen Forest through which the main thrust of the offensive was carried out. By mid-December, the Allies finally reached the Roer and tried to capture its important dams, when the Germans launched their own offensive, dubbed Wacht am Rhein. The ensuing Battle of the Bulge led to the immediate cessation of Allied offensive efforts into Germany until February 1945.

== Background ==
In June 1944, the Allies conducted the invasion in Northern France and opened a new front. After the Allied breakout from Normandy, the German Wehrmacht was involved in a string of disastrous battles in July and August, most notably the Falaise pocket. Following those events, the German defense in northern and western France disintegrated, leading to a hasty retreat of the German forces. The rapid Allied advance together with the ongoing march of the Red Army in the east led the Allied High command to believe that the Wehrmacht was about to collapse and total victory could be achieved by Christmas 1944. The Allies, therefore, launched a high-risk plan for a direct thrust through the Netherlands into Germany, called Operation Market Garden. This overly ambitious plan failed, as the Wehrmacht was able to reorganize itself and consolidate its strength. By mid-September, the Allied advance abruptly ended, as the Allies suffered from a logistics crisis, outrunning their supply lines. This gave the Germans further time to prepare for the upcoming Allied offensives. The Germans now could man the fortifications of the Westwall (Siegfried Line), although its old bunkers were more symbolic than a real obstacle for the Allies.

=== First thrust into the Hürtgen Forest ===
In the north in Belgium, the Allies were still involved in the Battle of the Scheldt, while in the south in France the Lorraine Campaign was still ongoing. In the center, the Battle of Aachen was fought from 2–21 October at the German border. The heavy German resistance upset Allied plans for a fast resumption of the rapid advance. As preparation for Operation Queen, a preliminary offensive into the Hürtgen Forest had to be carried out, to secure the flanks against a possible German counterattack out of the forest. The goal was to clear a pathway to the important road junction at Düren, to gain a respectable starting position for Queen. The 9th Infantry Division was already engaged in the forest since September, so only moderate German resistance was expected. On 2 November, three days before the anticipated start of Operation Queen, the offensive against the town of Schmidt was launched by the 28th Division against the German 275th Division. The town was captured, but the Germans reacted swiftly by reallocating forces of the 89th Infantry Division and mobile reserves from the 116th Panzer Division, which drove the Allies out of the town, transforming the battle into a bloody stalemate.

=== Planning ===
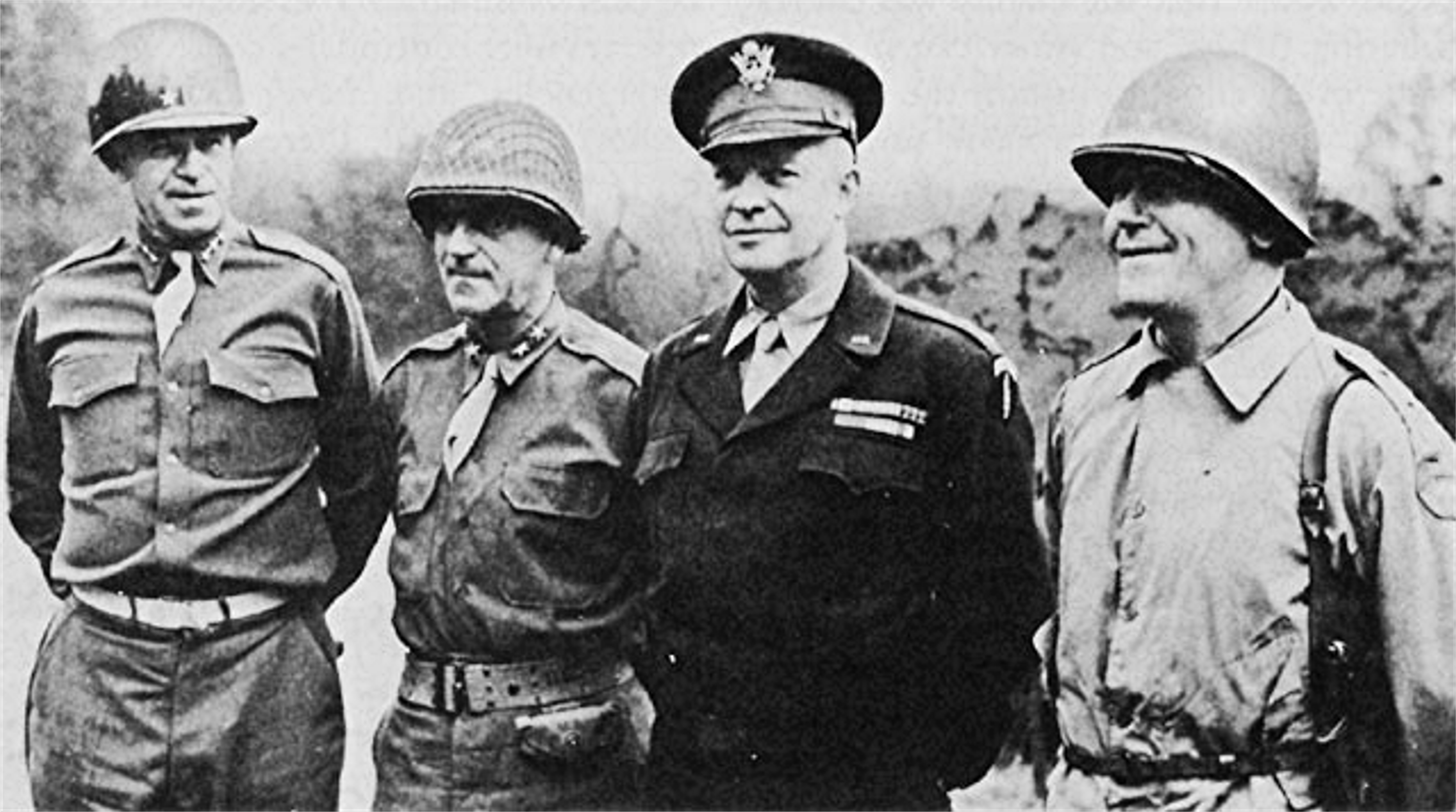
(from left to right) Bradley, Gerow, Eisenhower and Collins

The Allied High Command planned a large offensive in the area of the Ninth U.S. Army together with the First U.S. Army and parts of the British 2nd Army against the Roer River, intending to establish bridgeheads at Linnich, Jülich and Düren. The First Army – already stationed near the Hürtgen Forest – had to carry out the main effort through the Hürtgen Forest toward the Roer. The Ninth Army had to advance north of the forest through the Roer plains. The British XXX Corps – together with units from the U.S. XIII Corps – had to reduce the Geilenkirchen salient in the north in a different operation named Operation Clipper. The long term target after the Roer was crossed was to reach the Rhine and establish bridgeheads at Krefeld and Düsseldorf to secure further advances inside Germany after the winter. A great number of American and British strategic bombers were to conduct a series of tactical assaults in the area to cut supply lines and destroy enemy infrastructure, and also to attack the enemy defenders inside their positions. The entire operation was codenamed Queen. The 8th U.S. Air Force was to bomb the fortifications around Eschweiler and Aldenhoven, while the medium bombers of the 9th Air Force were assigned to the second line of defense around Jülich and Langerwehe. At the same time, the RAF Bomber Command was to hit the traffic centres of Jülich and Düren hard; the smaller towns of Heinsberg, Erkelenz and Hückelhoven were designated as secondary targets.

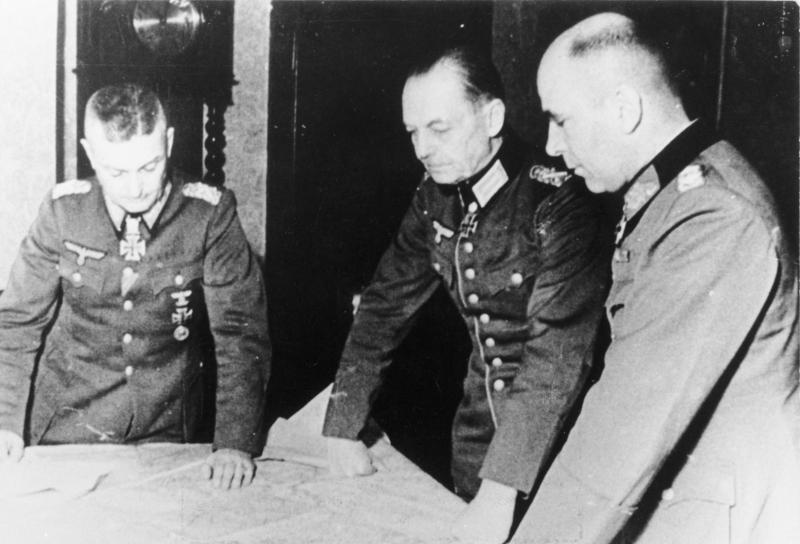
Rundstedt (middle) and Model (left) planning the Ardennes Offensive

Initially, the starting date of the offensive was set for 5 November, later 10 November, but because of bad weather it was delayed until 16 November. The ground offensive was to begin immediately after the air raids, allowing the defenders no time to reestablish fortifications, supply routes and communications.

German planning was entirely different. Running out of strategic options, the Wehrmacht planned an all-out counteroffensive in the West, codenamed Wacht am Rhein. The first draft of the plan was already completed in secret in October 1944 and was aimed against the Ardennes, mirroring the successful campaign in 1940 against France. The plan required for the best divisions of the Wehrmacht to be held back from the autumn fighting, to gain time to build them up for the planned offensive. For the successful execution of the plan, the holding of the Roer river line was deemed as absolutely important, to prevent the Allies from a flanking attack. The German plan for the November–December Campaign was, therefore, to hold the Roer river line with a minimum of available forces until the Ardennes Offensive could be launched.

The Germans also had a card up their sleeve. With control over the dams on the Roer, they could release the water from them and flood the Roer valley and everything else downstream of it as far as the Meuse and into the Netherlands. That would cause large scale destruction and destroy Allied bridges over the Roer, isolating all troops east of the river. The Allies did not fully recognize the strategic importance of the dams for some time, and only days before the end of the offensive they made their first specific moves towards them.

=== Opposing forces ===
The Allied forces participating in the operation were the U.S. First and Ninth Armies, assigned to Omar Bradley's 12th Army Group. The First Army's units for the operation consisted of the V and VII Corps, that latter assigned for the main thrust through the Hürtgen Forest, with V Corps protecting its southern flank. For the upcoming offensive, both armies were heavily reinforced. Total strength of the First Army rose from about 250,000 in September to about 320,000 before the offensive, although only about 120,000 troops would participate in the main operation. The First Army's tank strength was about 700 tanks. In October the Allies suffered from major supply shortcomings, but by early November those had been mostly resolved. The Ninth Army was somewhat smaller, consisting mainly of the XIX Corps and some independent divisions, with the XIII Corps in reorganization. As support for the ground operations, the Allies planned their largest tactical bombing of the war, employing more than 4,500 planes.

After the chain of disasters in the summer of 1944, the Allies expected the Wehrmacht to be unable to recover, but this was not the case. Although manpower losses were enormous, the Wehrmacht sought to compensate for this with transferring of men from the Reserve Army, the Luftwaffe and the Kriegsmarine into frontline troops for rebuilding their forces. Regarding industrial production the situation was even better. Despite the increasing Allied bombing campaign and the loss of territories and factories, Germany reached its peak of wartime production in the autumn of 1944, after the reforms of Albert Speer and the increased use of forced labour. For the preparing of the Ardennes Offensive, the 5th Panzer Army was pulled out of the front and replaced by the 15th Army, although for deception purposes its name was changed to conceal this fact. The Allies, therefore, faced two armies: the 15th army under the command of General der Infanterie Gustav-Adolf von Zangen which was positioned in the Hürtgen Forest; and the 7th Army under the command of General der Panzertruppe Erich Brandenberger was positioned in the north in the Roer plains. Although nominally an equal force to the Allies on paper, the Germans were heavily outnumbered. In some sectors, the ratio of attacker to defender was about 5 to 1. The reason for this was the acute manpower shortage that the Germans were experiencing. Most of the German units were seriously understrength, with some divisions consisting of only a few thousand men. However, heavy entrenchment and the availability of considerable tank and artillery support went some way to compensate for those problems. The German troops were commanded by OB West Generalfeldmarshall Gerd von Rundstedt and commander of Army Group B Generalfeldmarshall Walter Model, with the latter considered a skilled defense specialist.

== Offensive ==
=== Preliminary air raids ===
On 16 November 1944 between 11:13 and 12:48, the Allied bombers conducted the preliminary bombings of Operation Queen. 1,204 heavy bombers of the U.S. 8th Air Force hit Eschweiler, Weisweiler and Langerwehe with 4,120 bombs, while 339 fighter bombers of the U.S. 9th Air Force attacked Hamich, Hürtgen and Gey with 200 short tons (180 t) of bombs. At the same time, 467 Handley Page Halifax and Avro Lancaster heavy bombers attacked Düren and Jülich; 180 British bombers hit Heinsberg.

The result of the bombing was mixed. The German towns being hit suffered from severe destruction. German communications after the bombing were heavily impaired, and there was a considerable effect on morale, especially of units consisting of younger and more inexperienced troops. However, the direct damage dealt to the German frontline troops was low, and casualties were few. Allied air commanders admitted that the bombing did not measure up to expectations. About 12 aircraft were shot down during the initial bombing by meager anti-aircraft fire.

=== First Army's advance through the Hürtgen Forest ===
==== VII Corps November fighting ====
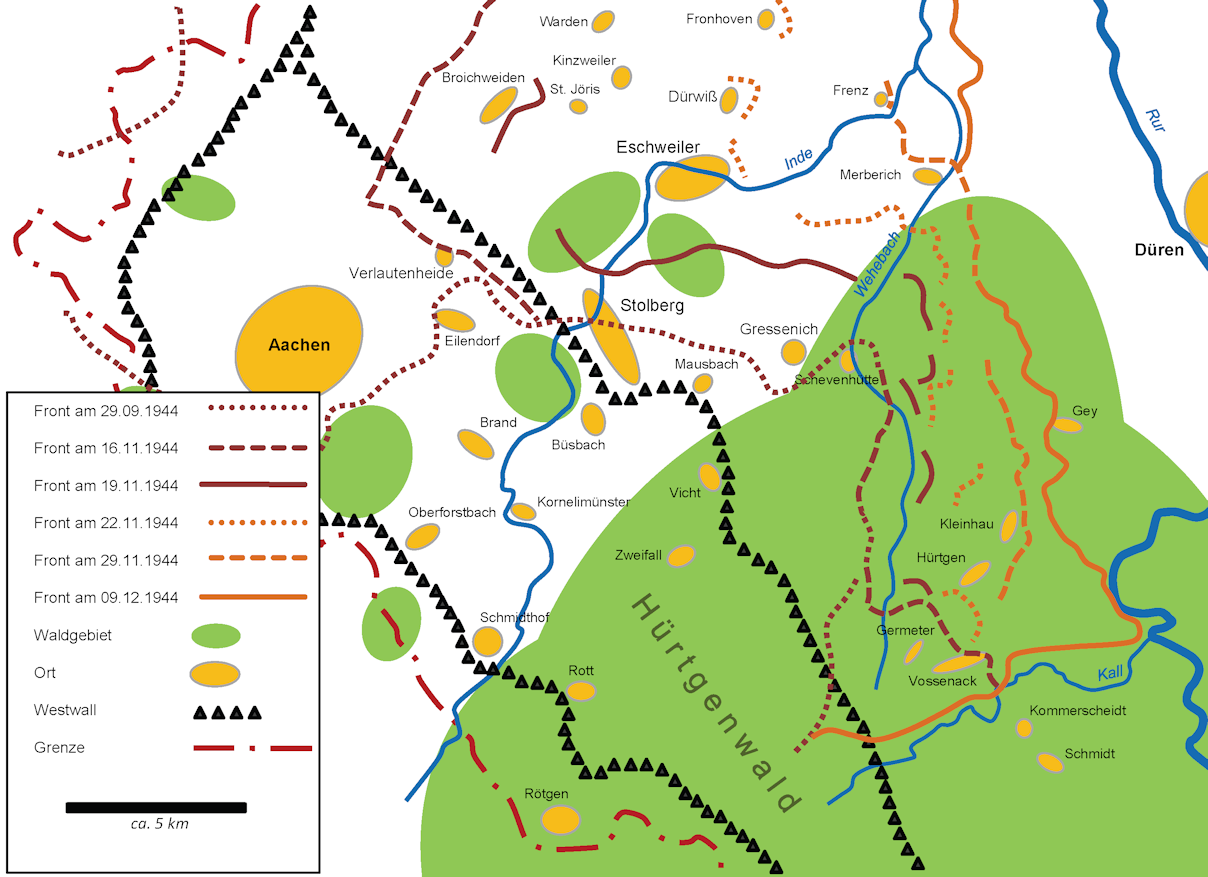
The offensive from November until 9 December

Together with the bombing raids, heavy artillery bombardments preceded the main thrust of J. Lawton Collins' VII Corps. Opposed to his units were the shattered forces of LXXXI Corps, commanded by Friedrich Köchling. The LXXXI Corps consisted of three divisions: the 3rd Panzergrenadier Division, the 246th Infantry Division and the 12th Volksgrenadier Division. Another unit, the 47th Volksgrenadier Division, was in the process of being transferred to the front. It was mostly made up of 18– and 19-year-old Luftwaffe personnel. All the German divisions were seriously understrength, but mobile artillery and tank reserves were available.

The attack of VII Corps commenced with a two-pronged attack with 1st Infantry Division on the right and the 104th Infantry Division on the left. In its initial attack 1st Division was only able to make ground slowly against the 47th VGD around Hamich. Casualties were heavy, especially after reinforced counterattacks on Hamich and nearby Hill 232 by the 47th VGD and still-present mobile reserves from the 116th Panzer Division. After four days of fighting Hamich was taken, but 1st Division had only advanced about 3.2 km (2.0 mi), with casualties already numbering more than 1,000 men.

Meanwhile, Collins ordered the American 3rd Armored Division to divide its constituent combat commands. CCA was assigned to assist the 104th Division, while CCB would act independently to take four villages (Werth, Koettenich, Scherpenseel, and Hastenrath) in the northwestern fringes of the Hürtgen Forest, defended by the 12th VGD. This small corridor between the 1st and the 104th Division was one of the few places suitable for an armored thrust. Although CCB was able to accomplish its task in three days, the heavy mud had hindered its movement and tank casualties were heavy; CCB lost 49 out of 69 tanks.

1st Division's advance continued to be slow. The German defenders were in a favorable heightened position, from which they could overlook the approach routes of the Allied forces. The German tactic was to fight mainly in the thick woods, where American artillery and aerial support was ineffective and a state of bloody trench warfare emerged. The Americans had to take hill after hill in heavy fighting, while casualties were mounting. Numerous German counterattacks slowed the advance down even more, often taking back ground which had just been captured in a bloody fight. In an act of desperation, Collins moved in virtually all of his available artillery to blast a way for the 1st Division on 21 November. With the Allied advance already flagging in the first phase of the offensive, CCA of the 3rd Armored Division was assigned to the northern part of the 1st Division's left flank. The armored attack was able to capture the castle at Frenz (near Inden). This fight lasted until 28 November. Meanwhile, GFM Rundstedt decided to inject some reinforcements into the battle, but only if two divisions were simultaneously pulled out from the front for the Ardennes Offensive preparations. Therefore, the 3rd Parachute Division was transferred to the front, while the bled out 12th and 47th VGD were withdrawn. The logistical difficulties and the inexperience of the new opponent aided 1st Division and it was finally able to push out of the forest, taking Langerwehe, Jüngersdorf and Merode by 28 November. Nevertheless, the dire situation did not change, and a violent counterattack by 3rd Parachute Division at Merode led to the destruction of two companies. At the beginning of December, 1st Division was worn out and had already suffered about 6,000 casualties.

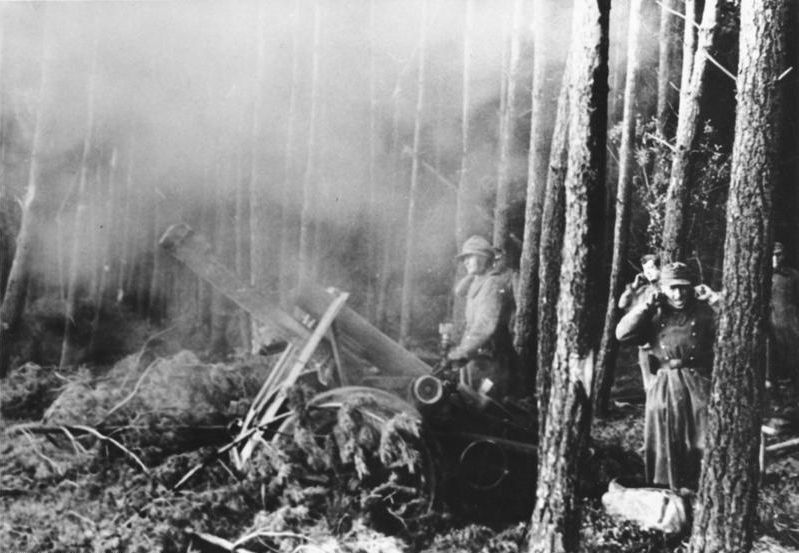
German artillery in the Hürtgen Forest

The advance of the 104th Division went somewhat better. The unit secured the left flank of VII Corps between the First and the Ninth US Army. The target of the unit was the industrial triangle at Eschweiler-Weisweiler and the Eschweiler woods at Stolberg. This part of the front was dominated by the Donnerberg, near the identically named village. The division faced the German 12th VGD as well as the 3rd Panzergrenadier Division. Heavy fighting ensued at the Donnerberg, but by 19 November the important hill was in American hands. After that, the division renewed its drive and headed for Stolberg and Eschweiler simultaneously. Stolberg was taken on the same day, but German resistance at Eschweiler was heavy, so the Americans attempted to encircle the town. This worked, and the German command decided to withdraw from the town, abandoning it to the 104th Division. The division then advanced alongside the western bank of the Inde River. Heavy fighting ensued, and the 12th VGD fought to its near destruction, until it was replaced by the incoming 3rd Parachute Division. By 26 November Weisweiler was taken after the Germans chose to retreat from the town. Inden fell on 30 November, bringing the industrial triangle into American hands. The 104th Division now held the western bank of the Inde and was ready to cross the river to push to the Roer. The crossing of the river at Lamersdorf commenced on 2 December. It was initially successful and in a swift advance the real objective, Lucherberg, was taken. The division was still conducting mop-up operations when the Germans mounted a counterattack against the town, assisted by heavy tanks. Intense fighting raged on for hours; on 5 December the town was finally secured, and Collins ordered a pause due to the slow advance of the other divisions of the corps.

Aside from the double thrust conducted by the 1st and 104th Division, the American command had determined that another attack route should be taken towards Düren. This task was passed to the 4th Infantry Division, which was positioned at VII Corps southern wing to take a route between Hürtgen and Schevenhütte, also capturing the villages of Kleinhau and Grosshau. Here the division would take over positions of the depleted 28th Infantry Division, which had been badly mauled during the preliminary fighting of Operation Queen at Schmidt. This position was still held by the weakened but experienced German 275th Infantry Division. The thinned out German lines could not offer as much resistance as in early November, but the difficult terrain, as well as the mines, caused heavy casualties to the Americans. After five days of fighting, the division had only advanced about 2.5 km (1.6 mi), but had already suffered 1,500 casualties. At the same time, the German command again made changes to the order of battle. The 116th Panzer Division, which had helped to mount several counterattacks during the early fighting, was withdrawn on 21 November from the area to be refitted for the upcoming Ardennes Offensive. The same was for the understrength 275th Division. As compensation, the inexperienced 344th Volksgrenadier Division was released and rushed to the front, while the 353rd Volksgrenadier Division was placed behind it as a reserve force.

==== V Corps joins the offensive ====
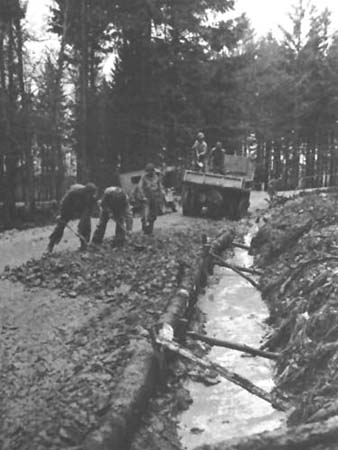
Army engineers repairing a muddy road in the Hürtgen Forest

The initial planning did not see a deployment of General Gerow's V Corps until VII Corps had achieved a major breakthrough. V Corps then would have to make a close drive together with VII Corps towards Bonn. However, after the first days the American senior command realized that VII Corps would need extra assistance to achieve a breakthrough. Therefore, V Corps was ordered to join the fighting. The Corps was situated south of VII Corps. Gerow's first action was to relieve the 28th Division with the 8th Infantry Division, to assist the drive of the already fighting 4th Division. The division was assisted by a CCR from the 5th Armored Division. The corps took over Hürtgen and Kleinhau as objectives from the 4th Division and started its attack on 21 November.

The advance of the 8th Division was steady but very slow. 4th Division reached Grosshau on 25 November, but could not capture it due to heavy resistance and coordination problems with the supporting armored units. At the same time, the tanks of CCR tried a direct assault on Hürtgen, which ended in complete failure against German anti-tank positions. In a renewed attack conducted by infantry only, Hürtgen was taken on 28 November. The 4th and 8th divisions simultaneously attacked Grosshau and Kleinhau on 29 November, and both towns were captured the same day. This success spurred the American efforts. The 8th Division together with the CCR continued its advance for the next days eastwards towards the Brandenberg-Bergstein ridge. Brandenberg was taken on 2 December. The same day a rare massive Luftwaffe raid occurred with about 60 planes, but did only minor damage. On 5 December Bergstein fell. Facing the Allied advance, the Germans mounted a massive counterattack into the town. During the night and over the next day heavy fighting ensued until the German forces were repulsed, and Castle Hill, an important hill beyond Bergstein overseeing the town, was taken. V Corps was now in striking distance of the Roer and reached the river a day later.

In the meantime, 4th Division also had made some progress. After the capture of Grosshau, the division was aided by the armored forces of the CCR. The division now headed for Gey, which was reached on 30 November, but heavily defended. Two days later the Germans mounted a counterattack out from Gey, which caused heavy casualties. The attack was only stopped by intense artillery fire. Since the beginning of the offensive, 4th Division had already lost about 6,000 men and was now unable to conduct further offensive operations. Subsequently, Collins decided to halt its offensive operations and pulled the division out to replace it with the 83rd Infantry Division on 3 December.

At the beginning of December, First Army had fought its way through most of the Hürtgen Forest. Although V Corps had reached the Roer at the very southern wing, VII Corps was still short of its objective of reaching the Roer. Casualties for this campaign were tremendous. The fighting for the Hürtgen Forest, which lasted already since September, had cost the Americans about 32,000 men.

=== Ninth Army's advance through the Roer plains ===
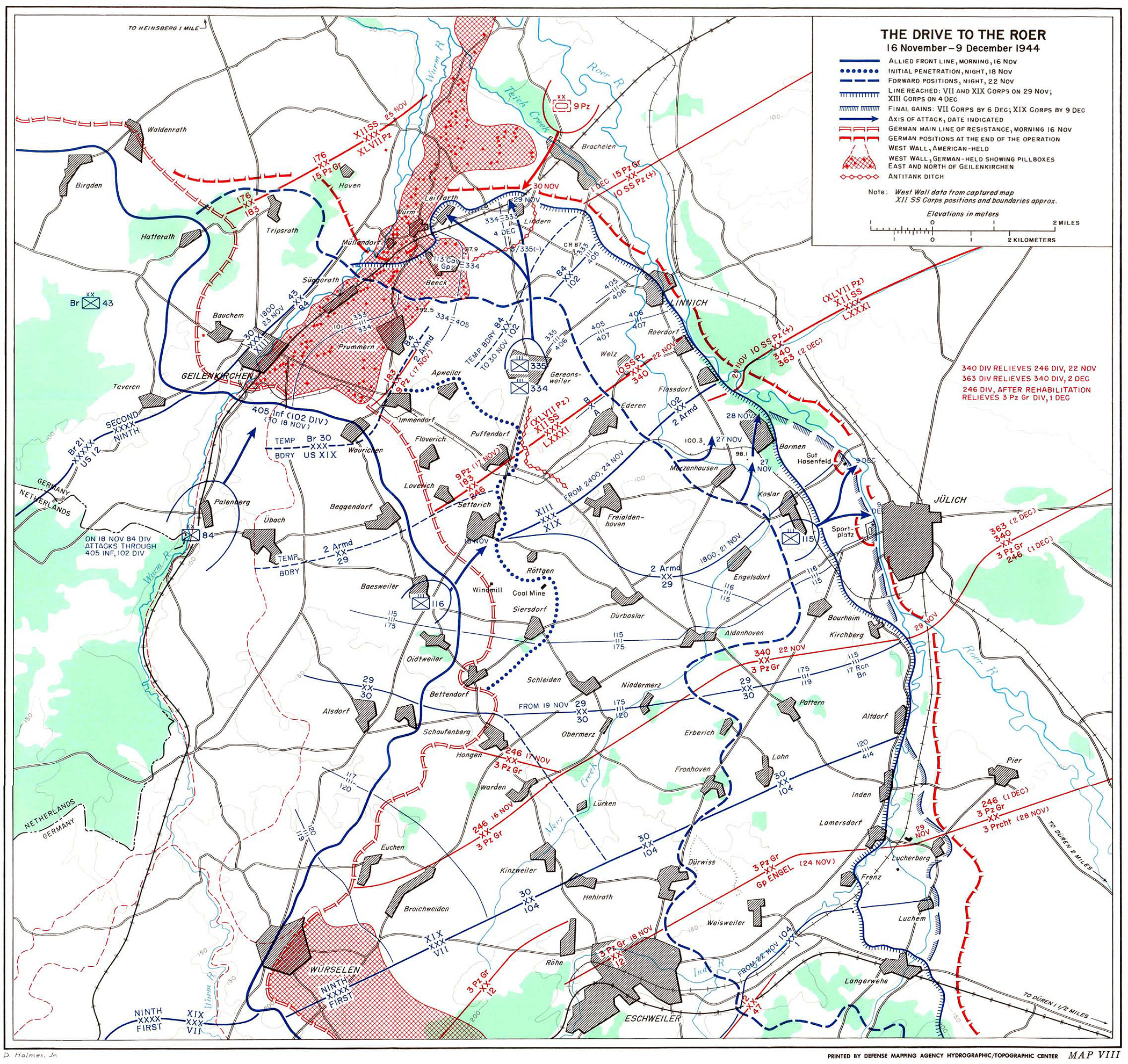
Fighting on the Roer plains (part of Operation Queen) and reduction of the Geilenkirchen salient (Operation Clipper)

Parallel to First Army's advance through the Hürtgen Forest, Ninth Army had to advance through the Rur plains. This terrain was fundamentally different from the dense forest, consisting of flat farmland with small villages. Planning for this area for both sides was different, as the Germans expected the Allied main thrust through this area, while it was actually through the Hürtgen Forest. One of the reasons for this decision was the dangerous Geilenkirchen Salient at Ninth Army's northern flank, which would have threatened the American advance. This salient was reduced and rendered harmless in Operation Clipper, by a combined US-British attack until 22 November. The 84th Division of XIII Corps of the Ninth Army played a major role in this operation.

Ninth Army's drive was conducted mainly by XIX Corps under General Gillem and was opposed by Köchling's LXXXI Corps as well as the reserve forces of the XLVII Panzer Corps. The plan called for a swift advance to Jülich with its 3 divisions. The 2nd Armored Division had to advance in a narrow line towards Linnich and from there towards the Roer. In the center 29th Infantry Division had to take the direct path towards Jülich and in the south the 30th Infantry Division had to take Würselen and then continue to the Rur.

As in the First Army's sector, Operation Queen began with a massive aerial bombardment against German towns and positions on 16 November. After the air strike was over, the American offensive was launched. 30th Division started a frontal attack against its first objective – Würselen. After four days of slow advance, the town was taken. The German resistance from the 3rd Panzergrenadier Division was hampered due to the large area it had to cover. In the center, 29th Division also commenced with its attack. The plan called to advance in between the towns to deal with the fortified strong points after they were encircled. This plan, however, was flawed and 29th Division soon was pinned down making no further progress. With assistance from the 2nd Armored Division, on 18 November its drive was renewed against the opposing German 246th VGD, taking Setterich, Bettendorf and the surroundings of Siersdorf. The understrength 246th VGD was heavily reduced, and by 21 November the Americans were just 2 km (1.2 mi) ahead of the Roer.

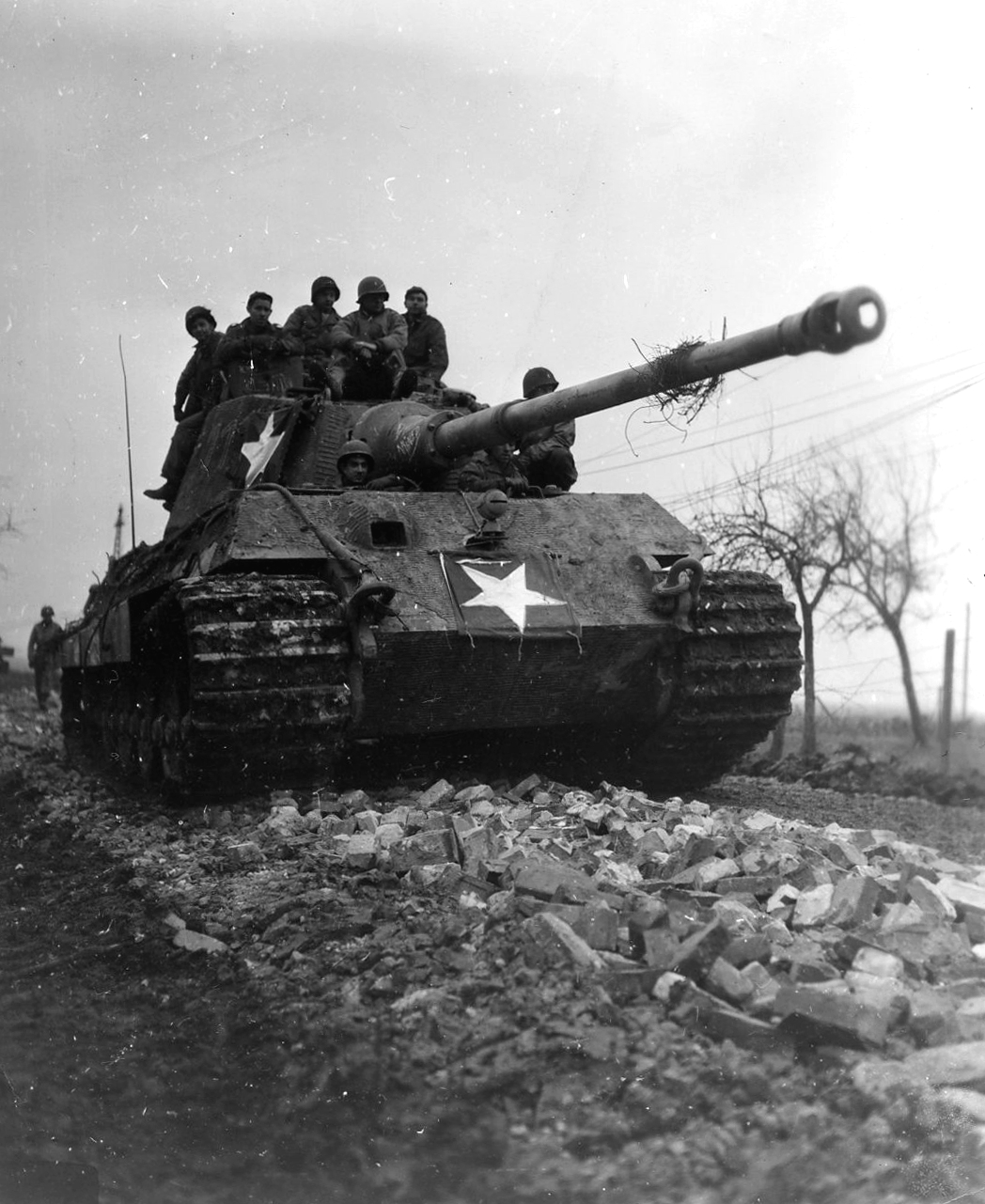
Captured Tiger II with improvised Allied markings

Meanwhile, in the north 2nd Armored Division also had commenced its attack on Gereonsweiler and Linnich. The advance was very steady, and already on the next day the towns Puffendorf and Immendorf were taken. This alarmed the German command and Rundstedt authorized the release of the 9th Panzer Division for a heavy armored counterattack against the two towns. Attached to this unit was the 506th Heavy Panzer Battalion with about 36 King Tiger tanks. At Immendorf the Germans were able to break into the town, but were repelled in close quarter fighting at dawn. The main fighting, however, was at Puffendorf. Since 2nd Armored Division also wanted to continue its advance towards Gereonsweiler, the division was caught in the open when about 30 German tanks approached it. In the ensuing battle, the Americans were pushed back into Puffendorf with heavy losses. Fighting then continued around the towns. German losses for this day were 11 tanks, while the 2nd Armored Division lost about 57 tanks in the fighting. However, the stalemate did not last long, as the Americans were able to push slowly forward through combined heavy artillery and aerial support. On 20/21 November, heavy fighting occurred in and around Gereonsweiler, until the Germans retreated and the town was finally in American hands.

As of 22 November, all 3 divisions of XIX Corps were in striking range of the Rur. At this point, the German command decided to release another division, the 340th Volksgrenadier Division, to the front, as the threat to Jülich came apparent. The 340th Division moved in to take over positions of the badly mauled 246th VGD. Due to this reinforcement, the advance of the 29th and 30th Infantry Division stalled after they were ejected from Bourheim. The last German defense ring before Jülich was now between Bourheim, Koslar and Kirchberg (Jülich). The same happened to the 2nd Armored Division which was repelled from Merzenhausen. During the next days, fighting at the defense line was very intense, mostly leading to the exchange of heavy artillery barrages. Bourheim was taken on 23 November but remained under constant shelling from German forces. Two days later American troops entered Koslar. A subsequent German counterattack managed to break into Bourheim and Koslar, but was soon afterwards repelled. On 26 November a general offensive was started to finally push to the Roer. Koslar, Kirchberg and Merzenburg were taken on 27 November. By 28 November, XIX Corps had reached the Roer on a broad front with only two German bridgeheads on the western side of the river remaining, which were not taken until 9 December.

North of XIX Corps, Geilenkirchen had been captured during Operation Clipper, but the Allied advance had stalled at Wurm some kilometers short of the Roer, rendering the Allied advance in this sector a stalemate. Ninth Army's casualties for Operation Queen were 1,133 killed, 6,864 wounded, and 2,059 missing.

=== VII Corps pushes to the Roer ===
While Ninth Army's advance was successful, at the beginning of December VII Corps had just left the Hürtgen Forest, was still short of the Roer and had taken heavy casualties. For the upcoming conclusion of the offensive, 1st Infantry Division was replaced by 9th Infantry Division and 4th Infantry Division by the 83rd Infantry Division. After a deliberate break for reorganisation, the attack was resumed on 10 December towards the Roer and the key city of Düren. German manpower at this point was very low with the defense relying mostly on artillery support. In the north 104th and 9th Division, assisted by the 3rd Armored Division, didn't face much resistance. The 3rd Parachute Division and especially the worn out 246th VGD were not able to offer serious resistance. After four days 104th Division was at the Roer. The same was for the 9th Division. During the fighting, 3rd Parachute Division was replaced by the hastily assembled 47th Volksgrenadier Division.

In the south 83rd Division faced larger problems. It had to advance through the towns of Strass and Gey, the latter had just been the location of a heavy battle which had practically rendered 4th Division unavailable for further offensive operations. Nevertheless, the fresh 83rd Division assisted by the 5th Armored Division was able to take most of Strass and reach Gey the same day against the worn out 353rd VGD. However, the muddy road and mines prevented the Americans from bringing their tanks into both towns to support the infantry. As a result, after some determined German counterattacks on Schafberg, the American units in Strass were effectively cut off and had to be supplied by aircraft, while the Germans started several attacks on the town. Schafberg was retaken on 12 December and tanks reached Gey and Strass, easing the situations. Casualties nevertheless had been heavy, with about 1,000 men for the division in just 3 days.

In the north of Gey the division's advance fared better and the division took the towns Gürzenich and Birgel. On 14 December a renewed drive conducted by tanks was launched. After meeting initial heavy resistance east of Strass, the advance at other parts of the frontline forced the Germans to retreat. By 16 December VII Corps finally had reached the Roer, with only a few small bridgeheads west of the river remaining. Casualties for this campaign were tremendous, as VII Corps had about 27,000 casualties in one month.

=== The Roer dams ===
During the Allied approach towards the Roer, the issue of the Roer dams took on a new urgency. The dams were a strategically important target, as they would allow the Germans to flood the Roer valley and everything else downstream of it as far as the Meuse and into the Netherlands. This would delay the Allied offensive effort into Germany, possibly causing major casualties as well as trapping Allied units east of the flooding. It took a long time until the Allied high command recognized its importance and until the first specific actions were implemented towards them. The first approach was made by the RAF which was tasked to breach them, with bombing starting in early December. In continuous attack waves, hundreds of aircraft were thrown against the dams, but the damage was only negligible. On 13 December V Corps, already at the Roer, was tasked to start an offensive to seize the dams from various directions including the Ardennes sector. The offensive took the Germans by surprise, but as the Allies ran directly into the Germans being near ready for the Ardennes Offensive, resistance soon stiffened. On 16 December the Germans launched their final all-out offensive on their western front, Wacht am Rhein, which led to an immediate end of all Allied offensive efforts in this sector.

== Aftermath ==
Operation Queen was not able to meet its sophisticated goals. At the beginning of the offensive, Allied planners envisioned for the offensive to be just a staging point for a deep penetration over the Roer into Germany to the Rhine. After one month of heavy fighting the Americans had barely made it to the Roer. No bridgehead over the river had been made, the Germans still held some portions west of the river and the important Roer dams were still in German hands, threatening any further offensive operations. Even without knowing of the upcoming German offensive, Allied planners estimated the earliest date for a large thrust into Germany for mid-January.

The Wehrmacht was successfully able to delay the American advance towards the Roer. The Roer river line, whose holding was deemed necessary for the successful implementation of the Ardennes Offensive, was held. The preparation of the final Ardennes Offensive was mostly successful with Germany being able to build up enough troops in secrecy for a sufficient blow. On 16 December the Allies were taken by complete surprise and the Germans were quickly able to achieve a breakthrough. Later (14 until 26 January 1945), the Roer triangle was cleared during Operation Blackcock and only in February 1945 were the Allies finally able to cross the Roer, by then the road to the Rhine was clear.

However, the Ardennes offensive also showed the lack of any long-term strategic perspective for Germany. The superiority of the Allies in numbers of men and equipment could not be overcome by Germany. The successful holding of the Roer river line would only lead to a lengthened war, causing additional destruction and loss of life.

== Notes ==
- ^{a} VII Corps: 2,448 killed, 15,908 battle casualties, 8,550 non-battle casualties
  V Corps: 2,800 battle casualties, 1,200 non-battle casualties
  Ninth Army: 1,133 killed, 6,864 wounded, and 2,059 missing
  Casualties of the Roer dams offensive (13–16 December) and casualties in the Hürtgen Forest preceding 16 November not included

== See also ==
- 17th Armored Engineer Battalion
- 82nd Armored Reconnaissance Battalion
- List of World War II military operations

== Bibliography ==
- Andrews, Ernest A.; Hurt, David B. (2022). A Machine Gunner's War: From Normandy to Victory with the 1st Infantry Division in World War II. Philadelphia & Oxford: Casemate. ISBN 978-1636241043.
- Mayo, Lida (1968). The Ordnance Department: On Beachhead and Battlefront. Center of Military History, United States Army. Archived from the original on 6 November 2011.
- MacDonald, Charles B. (1993). The Siegfried Line campaign. Center of Military History, United States Army.
- Zaloga, Steven J. (2007). Siegfried Line 1944–45: Battles on the German frontier. Osprey Publishing. ISBN 978-1-84603-121-2.
