= Scheuerpflug =

Scheuerpflug is a German surname. Notable people with the surname include:

- Andreas Scheuerpflug (born 1967), German volleyball player
- Paul Scheuerpflug (1896–1945), German World War II general
