= Matthias Goebbels =

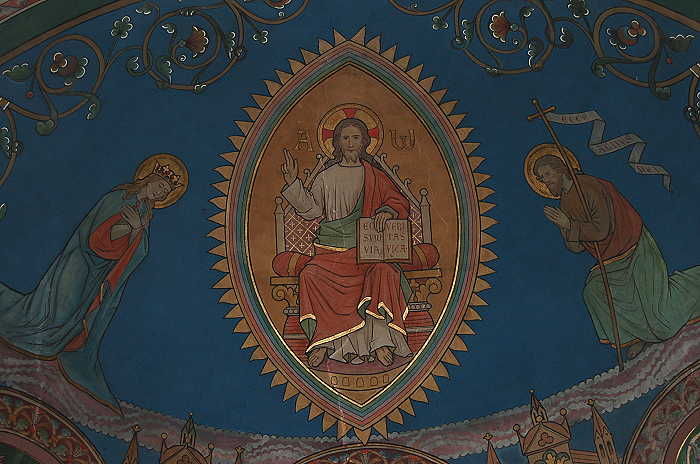
Painting by Matthias Goebbels at St. Briktius-Kirche in Oekoven, Germany

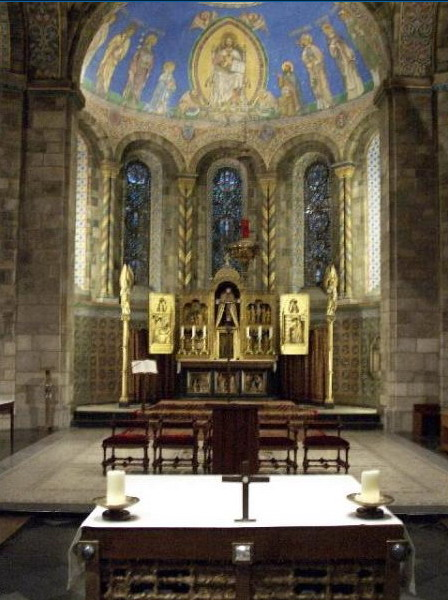
Interior of Rolduc Abbey, with Goebbels' painting over the altar

Joseph Matthias Hubertus Goebbels (19 March 1836 – 6 September 1911) was a German Catholic Priest and artist. Goebbels served as a priest at the Church of Sankt Maria im Kapitol in Cologne, Germany and became a noted painter of church interiors.

He was born in Baesweiler and his father was from Aldenhoven, Germany.

== Works ==
Goebbels painted in the historicist style of the Nazarene movement and decorated the walls of more than 20 churches in the Rhineland region. The interiors of Rolduc Abbey near Kerkrade, Netherlands are considered his masterpiece. Many of his paintings are no longer extant today, however well-preserved examples can be found near Rolduc, in particular at St. Briktius in Oekoven-Rommerskirchen (pictured) and at the former Marienborn Monastery (German: Kloster Marienborn) in the village of Hoven near Zülpich, Germany. He was also commissioned to paint the wings on the late Gothic altarpiece at Antwerp Cathedral with pictures from the life of Jesus.

=== Legacy ===
In appreciation of his services, in 1892 he was appointed Canon at Aachen Minster. Although a tomb in Aachen was built for him, his wishes were to be buried in his birthplace, so he is instead buried in Baesweiler cemetery. In the spring of 2007, a town square in front of the cemetery was named after him.

== Literature ==
- Klaus Hardering: Die Abteikirche von Klosterrath: Baugeschichte und Bedeutung = De Abdijkerk te Rolduc. Utrecht: Clavis, 1998. (Clavis kunsthistorische monografieen; 18) ISBN 90-75616-06-6
- Anke Twachtmann-Schlichter: Matthias Goebbels: Dekorationsmalerei und Kirchenrestaurierung im 19. Jahrhundert in Köln. Hildesheim; Zürich; New York: Olms 1994 (Studien zur Kunstgeschichte; Bd. 89) Zugl.: Münster (Westfalen), Univ., Diss., 1992 ISBN 3-487-09889-X
