= Robert Meißner =

Austrian officer

Robert Meissner
- Born: 23 December 1888; Vienna, Austria-Hungary
- Died: 8 August 1953 (aged 64); Talitsa, Sverdlovsk Oblast, Soviet Union
- Relatives: ∞ 30 June 1926 Elisabeth Palzow
- Military career
- Allegiance: (Austria-Hungary) Austria–Hungary; Republic of German-Austria; (Austria) First Austrian Republic; Nazi Germany
- Branch: Austro-Hungarian Army; German-Austrian People's Militia; Bundesheer; Army (Wehrmacht)
- Service years: 1908–1945
- Rank: Oberst (Austria); Generalleutnant (Germany)
- Commands: 28th Infantry Regiment; 68th Infantry Division
- Conflicts: World War I World War II: Eastern Front; Battle of Voronezh; Battle of the Caucasus
- Awards: Knight's Cross of the Iron Cross

Robert Meissner (23 December 1888 – 8 August 1953) was an Austrian officer, finally Lieutenant General of the Wehrmacht and recipient of the Knight's Cross of the Iron Cross in World War II.

== POW and death ==
On 5 May 1945, he was taken prisoner of war by the Russians in Prague. He was deported to the Soviet Union by the Red Army. There, he was held in various camps for the next several years, including NKVD Camps No. 76 (1st Ukrainian Front), No. 27 Krasnogorsk, No. 82 Voronezh, No. 483 Degtyarka, No. 476 Sverdlovsk, Special Hospital 1893 Pervouralsk, and Prison No. 1 Voronezh. On 15 May 1949, he was routinely sentenced by the Voronezh Military Court in a show trial to 25 years in a labor camp and transferred to Vorkuta. He died of stomach cancer on 8 August 1953. He was buried in the cemetery of Special Military Hospital No. 1893 Talitsa.

== Promotions ==
- 18 August 1908 Kadett-Offiziers-Stellvertreter (Officer Cadet; renamed Fähnrich on 1 October 1908)
- 1 May 1911 Leutnant (2nd Lieutenant)
- 1 August 1914 Oberleutnant (1st Lieutenant)
- 1 August 1917 Hauptmann (Captain)
- 8 July 1921 Major (title, not rank)
- 1 March 1923 Stabshauptmann (Staff Captain or Captain 1st Class)
- 27 September 1927 Major
- 21 June 1930 Oberstleutnant (Lieutenant Colonel)
  - 27 July 1938 received Wehrmacht Rank Seniority (RDA) from 1 March 1936 (34a)
- 23 September 1933 Oberst (Colonel)

=== Wehrmacht ===
- 13 March 1938 Oberst im Generalstab (Colonel in General Staff)
  - 15 August 1938 received preliminary Wehrmacht RDA from 23 September 1933
  - 20 April 1939 received adjusted Wehrmacht RDA from 1 April 1937 (13a)
- 20 April 1941 Generalmajor (Major General) with effect and RDA from 1 April 1941 (9)
- 16 November 1942 Generalleutnant (Lieutenant General) with effect and RDA from 1 October 1942 (18)

== Awards and decorations ==
- Military Jubilee Cross on 2 December 1908
- Military Merit Cross (Austria-Hungary), III. Class with War Decoration (ÖM3K) on 27 October 1914
  - When the "swords" were introduced to the war decoration on 13 December 1916, he was subsequently awarded this distinction (ÖM3KX).
- Military Merit Medal (Austria-Hungary) (Signum Laudis) in Bronze on the ribbon of the Military Merit Cross (ribbon for wartime merit) with Swords on 5 March 1917
- Karl Troop Cross
- Wound Medal (Austria-Hungary) with 2 Stripes
  - after the Anschluss in 1938 exchanged for the German Wound Badge (1918) in Black
- Military Merit Medal (Austria-Hungary) (Signum Laudis) in Silver on the ribbon of the Military Merit Cross (ribbon for wartime merit) with Swords on 28 June 1918
- Order of the Iron Crown (Austria), Knight III. Class with War Decoration and Swords (ÖEK3KX)
- Austrian War Commemorative Medal with Swords
- Austria Military Service Badge for Officers, 2nd Class on 8 October 1934
- Austrian Order of Merit (1934), Knight's Cross 1st Class
- Wehrmacht Long Service Award, 4th to 1st Class (25-year Service Cross)
- Honour Cross of the World War 1914/1918 with Swords
- Iron Cross (1939), 2nd and 1st Class
  - 2nd Class on 22 January 1942
  - 1st Class on 27 March 1942
- War Merit Cross (1939), 2nd Class with Swords on 24 November 1940
- Winter Battle in the East 1941–42 Medal on 19 August 1942
- Knight's Cross of the Iron Cross on 24 May 1943 as Generalleutnant and Commander of the 68. Infanterie-Division

== Sources ==
- German Federal Archives (Military Section): BArch PERS 6/747 and PERS 6/300209

Military offices
Preceded by Generalleutnant Georg Braun	Commander of 68. Infanterie-Division; 16 November 1941 – 26 January 1943	Succeeded by Generalleutnant Hans Schmidt
