= Hans Schmidt (general, born 1895) =

German general during World War II

- Born: 14 March 1895; Bayreuth, Upper Franconia, Kingdom of Bavaria, German Empire
- Died: 28 November 1971 (aged 76); Weiden in der Oberpfalz, Bavaria, West Germany
- Relatives: ∞ 1921 Sophie Münch; 2 daughters
- Military career
- Allegiance: German Empire (to 1918); Weimar Republic (to 1933); Nazi Germany
- Branch: Imperial German Army; Freikorps; Reichsheer; German Army
- Service years: 1914–1945
- Rank: Generalleutnant
- Commands: Infanterie-Regiment 245; 68. Infanterie-Division; 275. Infanterie-Division
- Conflicts: World War I November Revolution; World War II: Poland Campaign; Battle of France; Operation Barbarossa; Battle of Kiev (1941); Second Battle of Kharkov; Battle of Voronezh (1943); Battle of Kursk; Lower Dnieper Offensive; Operation Overlord; Falaise pocket; Battle of Aachen; Battle of Hürtgen Forest; Battle of Halbe
- Awards: Knight's Cross of the Iron Cross
- Other work: Insurance salesman

Hans Schmidt (14 March 1895 – 28 November 1971) was a German officer, finally general and divisional commander during World War II. He was a recipient of the Knight's Cross of the Iron Cross of Nazi Germany.

== Promotions ==
- 10 August 1914 Kriegsfreiwilliger (War Volunteer)
  - joined the Royal Bavarian 7th Infantry Regiment "Prince Leopold" of the Bavarian Army
- 2 October 1914 Fahnenjunker (Officer Candidate)
- 1 November 1914 Fahnenjunker-Gefreiter (Officer Candidate with Lance Corporal rank)
- 20 November 1914 Fahnenjunker-Unteroffizier (Officer Candidate with Corporal/NCO/Junior Sergeant rank)
- 24 June 1915 Fähnrich (Officer Cadet); simultaneously commissioned
- 24 June 1915 Leutnant (2nd Lieutenant) without Patent
  - 9 October 1917 received Patent as 2nd Lieutenant from 15 November 1913
  - 1 July 1922 received new Rank Seniority (RDA) from 1 April 1914
- 1 October 1923 Oberleutnant (1st Lieutenant)
- 1 May 1928 Hauptmann (Captain)
- 1 March 1935 Major (5)
- 31 December 1937 Oberstleutnant (Lieutenant Colonel) with effect and RDA from 1 January 1938 (14)
- 20 October 1940 Oberst (Colonel) with effect and RDA from 1 November 1940 (9)
- 20 April 1943 Generalmajor (Major General) with effect and RDA from 1 April 1943 (17a)
- 8 November 1943 Generalleutnant (Lieutenant General) with effect and RDA from 1 October 1943 (12b)

== Awards and decorations ==
- Iron Cross (1914), 2nd and 1st Class
  - 2nd Class on 14 March 1915
  - 1st Class on 30 October 1917
- Military Merit Order (Bavaria), 4th Class with Swords (BMV4X/BM4X) on 29 December 1915
- Military Merit Cross (Austria-Hungary), 3rd Class with War Decoration (ÖM3K) on 14 May 1917
- Wound Badge in Black on 19 August 1918
- DRA/German Gymnastics and Sports Badge (Deutsches Turn- und Sportabzeichen) in Silver on 10 August 1927
- DLRG basic certificate (Grundschein) of the German Life Saving Association
- Honour Cross of the World War 1914/1918 with Swords on 28 January 1935
- Wehrmacht Long Service Award, 4th to 1st Class
  - 2nd Class on 2 October 1936
- Hungarian World War Commemorative Medal with Swords and Helmet
- Bulgarian War Commemorative Medal 1915–1918 with Swords
- Anschluss Medal
- Sudetenland Medal with the Prague Castle Bar
- Repetition Clasp 1939 to the Iron Cross 1914, 2nd and 1st Class
  - 2nd Class on 19 September 1939
  - 1st Class on 12 October 1939
- Winter Battle in the East 1941–42 Medal on 1 August 1942
- Infantry Assault Badge in Silver on 11 October 1942
- German Cross in Gold on 20 April 1942 as Colonel
- Wound Badge (1939) in Silver
- Knight's Cross of the Iron Cross on 16 October 1944 as Generalleutnant and commander of 275. Infanterie-Division

Military offices
| Preceded by Generalleutnant Robert Meißner | Commander of 68. Infanterie-Division; 27 January 1943 - 25 October 1943 | Succeeded by Generalleutnant Paul Scheuerpflug |
| Preceded by None | Commander of 275. Infanterie-Division; 10 December 1943 - December 1944 | Succeeded by Disbanded |
| Preceded by Reformed after disbandment | Commander of 275. Infanterie-Division; January 1945 - May 1945 | Succeeded by None |
