= Karl-Heinz Rosch =

German soldier who died saving two Dutch children (1926–1944)

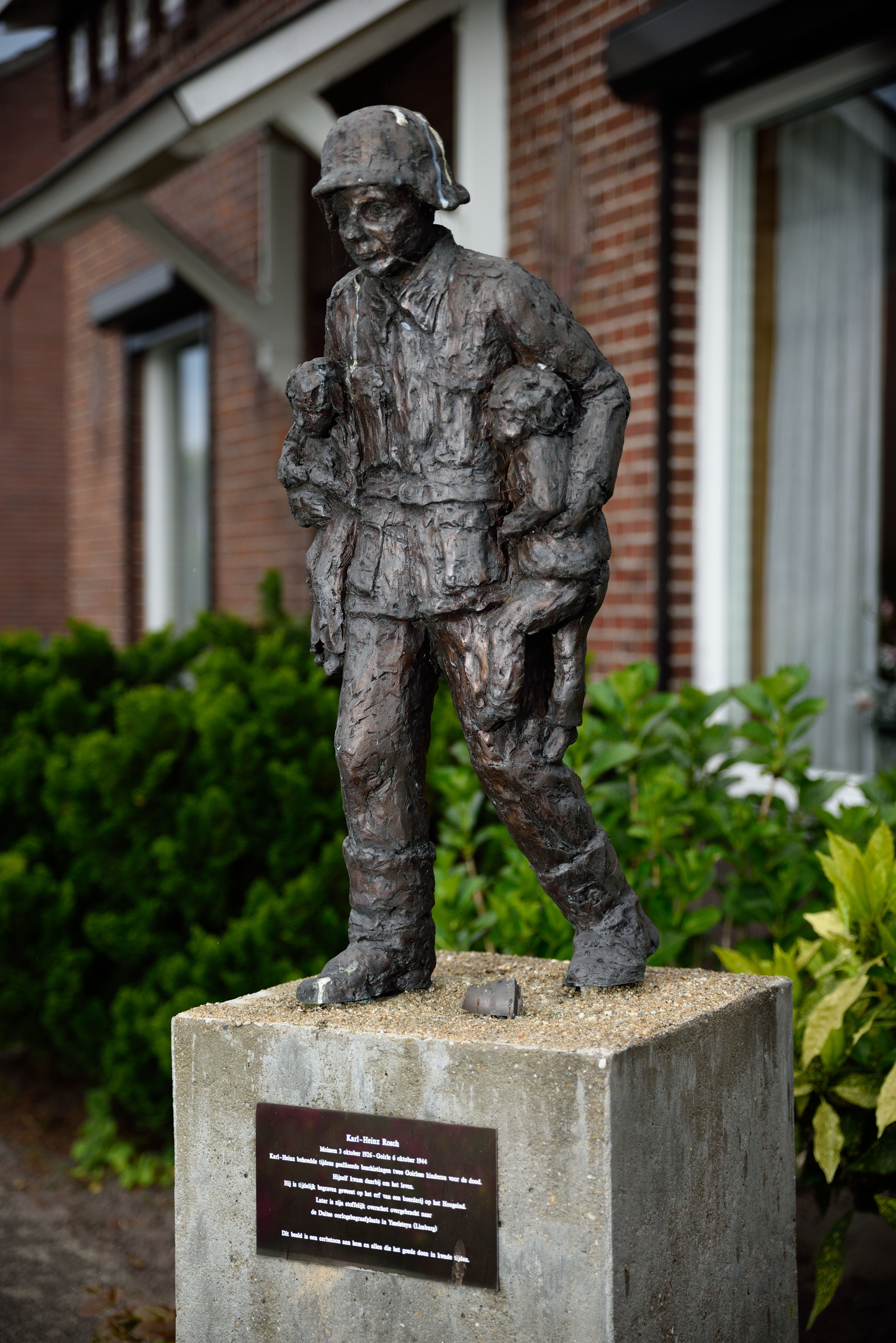
- Memorial of Rosch
- Born: 3 October 1926; Meissen, Free State of Saxony, Weimar Republic
- Died: 6 October 1944 (aged 18); Goirle, Netherlands
- Burial place: Ysselsteyn German war cemetery
- Military career
- Allegiance: Nazi Germany
- Branch: German Army
- Rank: Kanonier
- Conflicts: World War II

Karl-Heinz Rosch (Meissen, 3 October 1926 – Goirle, 6 October 1944) was a young German soldier who died saving the lives of two Dutch children (Toos and Jan Kilsdonk). Although he is best known for his final act (rescuing the children), he had previously helped civilians in the region in various ways. For example, he warned them of impending German inspections or the presence of high-ranking officers and personally helped them hide prohibited items. These actions could have led to his death sentence for "Landesverrat" or "Zersetzung der Wehrkraft."

He is the only German soldier to whom a memorial was erected by civilians from a former occupation zone.

== Background ==
Karl-Heinz Rosch was born in 1926 in Meissen. He was an unwanted child. His unwanted birth forced his young parents to marry. The marriage soon broke down, and both sought new relationships. Karl-Heinz grew up feeling like an obstacle in his parents' lives. After his father's military service, he moved to his grandfather's home in Nerchau (Grimma), where he spent most of his childhood and youth. His father and stepmother visited him occasionally, but he never had contact with his mother again.

He attended the Gymnasium St Augustine and was friends with the linguist Horst Naumann. Karl-Heinz Rosch was Naumann's best friend throughout his childhood and youth. He earned good grades in school and excelled at sports.

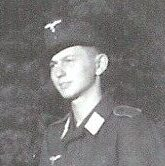
Karl-Heinz Rosch

Rosch was described by colleagues and family as often melancholic, but friendly, polite, and cooperative. According to his friend Horst Naumann, he often needed cheering up and seemed to harbor a certain quiet sadness within himself. He enjoyed walking in the forest with his dog and felt a deep connection with nature. His dream was to become a forest ranger.

Karl-Heinz had two half-brothers: Diethelm and Ingolf. He is described as a loving brother with a strong sense of responsibility, who always wanted to teach his half-brothers new things, especially in sports.

In the summer of 1944, he was drafted into the Wehrmacht and, after only two weeks of military training, sent to the Western Front. He was 17 years old.

== The Rescue ==
Three days after his 18th birthday, the Allied forces opened fire against Rosch and his platoon, who were stationed in a farm in Goirle. Rosch noticed that the two children of the farmer who owned the land seemed oblivious of the danger around them and continued to play in the courtyard. He ran to them, took each in his arms and brought them into the safety of the basement. He again ran outside to position himself on the other side of the courtyard when a grenade hit him right at the spot where the children were earlier. Rosch was killed instantly.

== Aftermath ==
Because Rosch was a German soldier, and the enemy, his story was kept private after the war. His story was not made public until 2004. Public funding for a statue was rejected, however funds were raised to create a statue as a memorial. On November 4, 2008 a bronze statue was erected on a private property in Goirle in memory of Karl-Heinz Rosch. The statue is considered to be the only monument in the world to a German World War II soldier who was part of an occupying force.

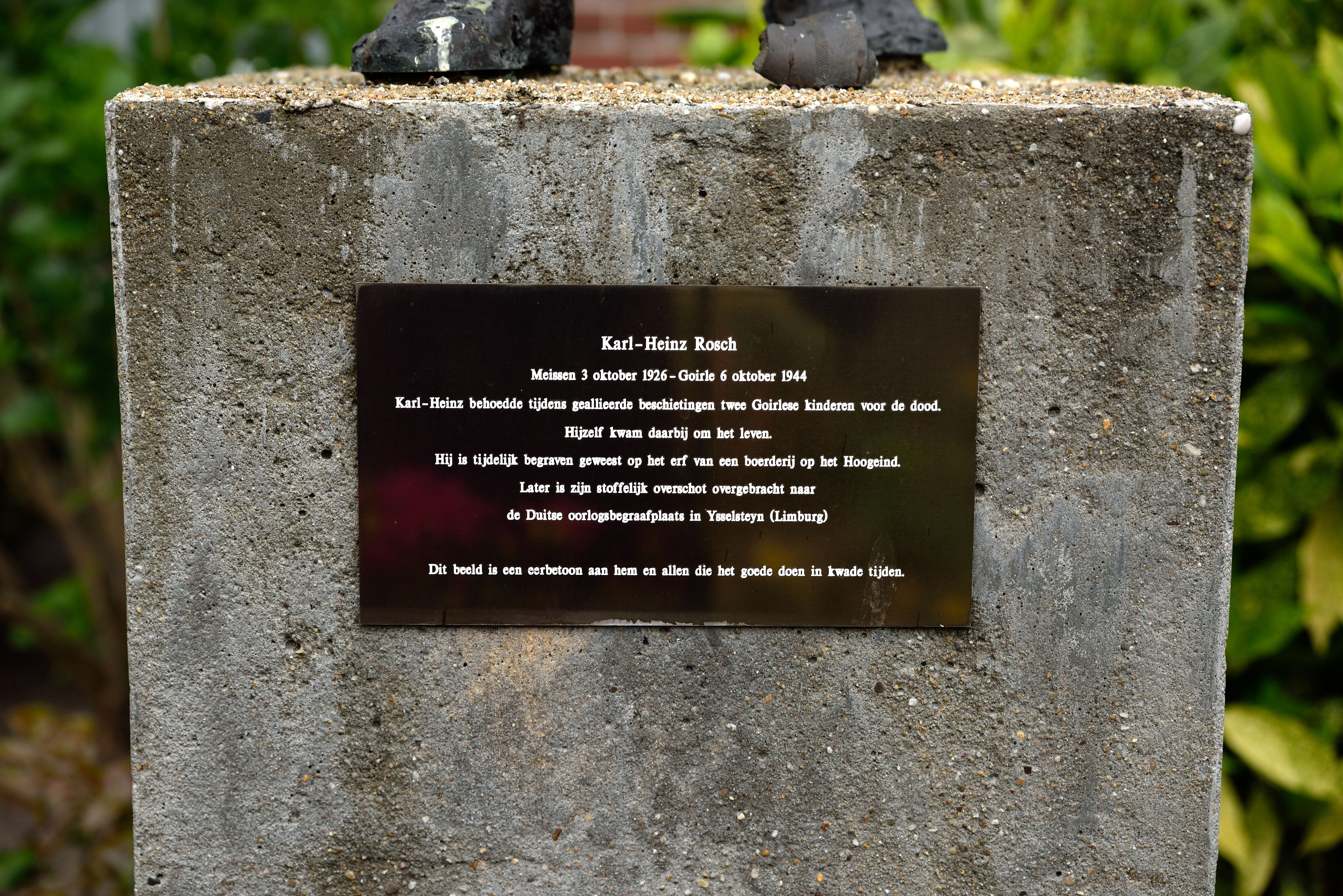
Inscription at the base of the statue. The last line reads "This statue is a tribute to him and to all who do good in evil times".

== See also ==
- Friedrich Lengfeld
