= Puffendorf (town) =

Village in Baesweiler, Germany

Coordinates: 50°56′18″N 6°12′31″E

Puffendorf is a church, village and northeastern district of Baesweiler in the Aachen urban region of North Rhine-Westphalia, Germany. It is located at the intersection of federal highways 56 and 57 of Germany.

In November 1944 it was the scene of a major tank engagement between the American 2nd Armored Division and the German 9th Panzer Division as part of Operation Queen.
