= 68th Infantry Division (Wehrmacht) =

- German: 68. Infanterie-Division
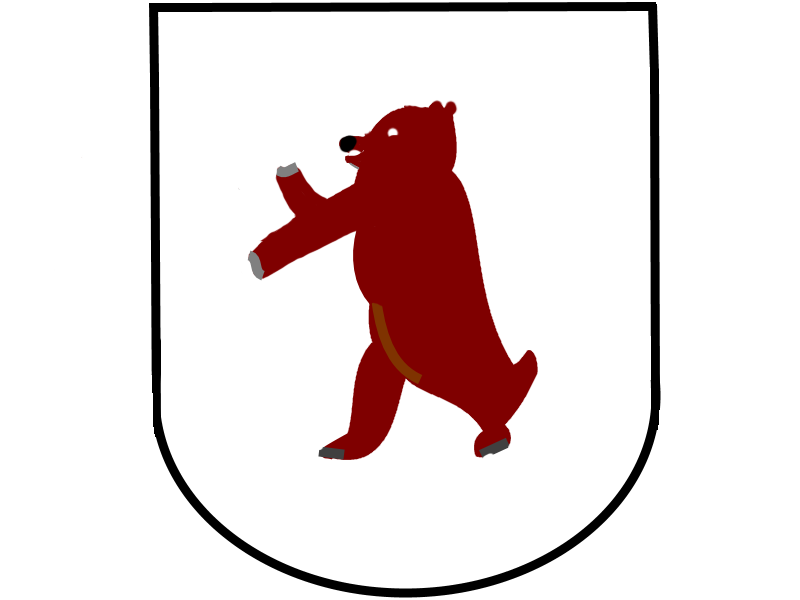
- 68. Infanterie Division Vehicle Insignia
- Active: 1939–1945
- Country: Nazi Germany
- Branch: Army
- Type: Infantry
- Size: Division
- Engagements: World War II

The 68th Infantry Division (German: 68. Infanterie-Division) was a formation of the German army during World War II. It was formed in 1939 and was initially committed to the German invasion of Poland. It took part in the Battle of France in 1940, and then Operation Barbarossa in 1941 as part of Army Group South. The 68th remained in southern Russia until refitted in Poland in early 1944. Returned to action the 68th fought for rest of the war in the East, in Russia, Slovakia, in the defence of Germany until finally surrendering to the Soviets in Czechoslovakia.

On 1 January 1945, the division, then under command of the 4th Panzer Army of Army Group A, had a strength of 11,697 men.

== History ==
=== Formation ===
Consisting of reservists from the second Aufstellungswelle, the 68th Infantry Division was mobilised on 26 August 1939, with its headquarters in Guben of the third military district. The division initially contained the 169th Infantry Regiment (Frankfurt (Oder)), the 188th Infantry Regiment (Guben), and the 196th Infantry Regiment (Küstrin), along with the 168th Artillery Regiment (Frankfurt (Oder)). The division's first commander was Generalmajor Georg Braun.

=== Invasion of Poland ===
With the German Invasion of Poland beginning on 1 September, the 68th Infantry Division fell under the VII Army Corps as part of the reserve element of Army Group South. During the invasion, the division would advance through Sandomierz before continuing on to Janów Lubelski. After the completion of the invasion, the division remained in Poland until December.

=== Battle of France ===
In December, the division was transferred to the Western Front, where it was attached to the 16th Army of Army Group A near the Moselle. On 29 February 1940, the 2nd Battalion of the 169th Infantry Regiment was sent to the 293rd Infantry Division as part of the eighth Aufstellungswelle and was subsequently replaced. The division took part in the Battle of France and, following the occupation of Paris, returned to Poland in July. In October, one-third of the division was moved to the 340th Infantry Division of the 14th Aufstellungswelle.

=== Operation Barbarossa ===
Upon the commencement of Operation Barbarossa on 22 June 1941, the division was attached to the 17th Army of Army Group South. As part of the invasion, the division advanced to Lviv, then to Vinnytsia, before reaching the Cherkasy area. After spending August with the 6th Army in Cherkasy, the division returned to the 17th Army the following month and continued its advance to Poltava in October. In November, the division advanced to Kharkov.

On 14 November, the division's commander, Generalmajor Georg Braun, along with two officers and 13 other men, were killed in an explosion at a divisional headquarters in Kharkov. The division, along with the 57th Infantry Division, subsequently arrested 1,200 people and immediately executed 50 as a reprisal. Another 150 were later murdered before the remaining hostages were held in the Hotel International on Dzerzhinsky Square. On 1 December, Braun was posthumously promoted to Generalleutnant. Braun's replacement, Generalmajor Robert Meißner, assumed command of the division on 16 November, and was promoted to Generalleutnant on 1 October 1942.

The division was heavily engaged during the Russian winter offensive of 1941–1942 and suffered heavy losses.

=== Eastern Front ===
At the turn of 1942, the division was engaged in fighting around Izium. In June, the division was attached to the 1st Panzer Army before joining the 2nd Army of Army Group B the following month. Situated around Voronezh, the division covered the north of Case Blue.

The division remained near Voronezh until February 1943, when the defeat at Stalingrad and the Voronezh–Kastornoye offensive forced the unit to join the German retreat. During this time, Robert Meißner relinquished command of the division on 24 January. He was succeeded by Oberst Hans Schmidt, who was promoted to Generalmajor on 1 April and Generalleutnant on 1 October.

In July, the division saw action at Sumy during the Battle of Kursk. Following the defeat at Kursk, the division fought a series of defensive battles under the 4th Panzer Army as part of the Battle of the Dnieper. On 25 October, Hans Schmidt was replaced by Oberst Paul Scheuerpflug, who was promoted to Generalmajor on 1 January 1944 and to Generalleutnant on 1 August 1944.

On 1 November 1943, the division was converted into the new Type 1944 Infantry Division, in which the third battalion of each grenadier regiment was disbanded, leaving the division with six grenadier battalions. Around this time and in the following months, the division suffered heavy losses from the defeat at Kiev, the Zhitomir–Berdichev offensive, and the Dnieper–Carpathian offensive.

In February 1944, the division was sent to Troop Manoeuvre Area Demba, where it was partially rebuilt. However, the division's grenadier battalions were understrength. The division returned to the front in March, where it supported the 1st Panzer Army during its breakout of the Kamenets–Podolsky pocket. From May to July, the division fought alongside the Hungarian First Army in the Lvov-Sandomierz Offensive.

=== Final battles and surrender ===
After the division had fought in Slovakia and southern Poland in the fall of 1944, it was involved in the defence of the Sandomierz bridgehead. In February and March, the division took part in the defence against the Upper Silesian offensive. Following defeat during the Moravia–Ostrava offensive, the division surrendered to the Red Army in the Jägerndorf area in May 1945. The division's commander, Paul Scheuerpflug, was wounded at this time and would die in a POW camp hospital in Auschwitz on 8 August.

== Commanding officers ==
- Generalleutnant Georg Braun, 26 August 1939 - 14 November 1941
- Generalleutnant Robert Meißner, 16 November 1941 - 26 January 1943
- Generalleutnant Hans Schmidt, 27 January 1943 - 25 October 1943
- Generalleutnant Paul Scheuerpflug, 25 October 1943 - 8 May 1945

== Notable people ==
- Sniper Bruno Sutkus

== Sources ==
=== Literature ===
- Mitcham, Samuel W. (28 September 2023). German Order of Battle Volume One, Volume 3. Stackpole Books. ISBN 978-0-8117-3416-5.
