= Friedrich Lengfeld =

German officer of World War II

Leutnant Friedrich Lengfeld
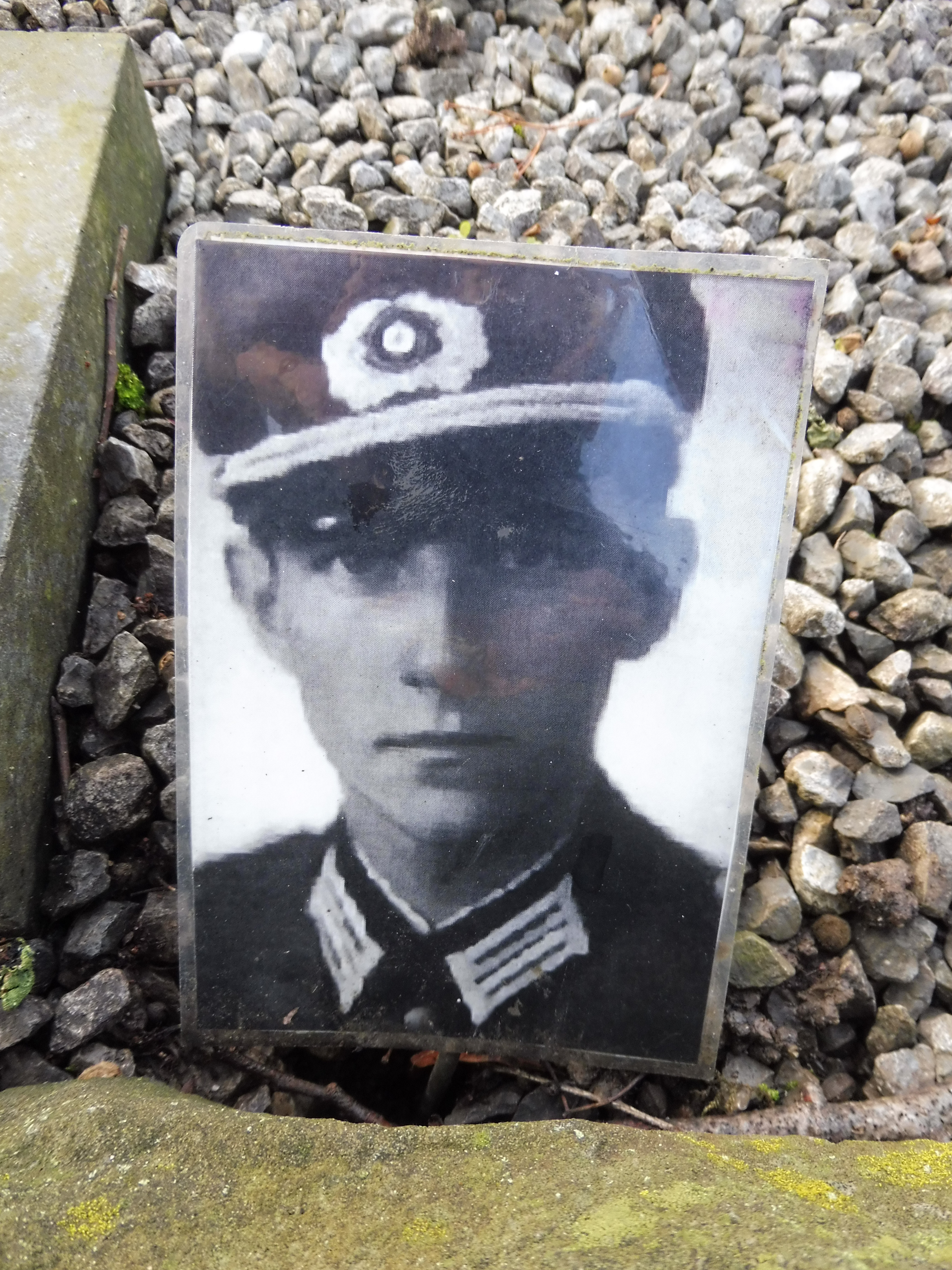
- Portrait of Lengfeld at Düren-Rölsdorf cemetery
- Born: 29 September 1921; Grünfelde, East Prussia, Germany
- Died: 12 November 1944 (aged 23) Hurtgen Forest, North Rhine-Westphalia, Nazi Germany
- Buried: Düren-Rölsdorf war cemetery (Grave 38)
- Allegiance: Nazi Germany
- Branch: German Army
- Service years: ?-1944
- Rank: Leutnant
- Service number: No. 1406 1. Geb.Jäg.Ers.Btl.98
- Commands: 2nd Company, Fusilier Battalion, 275th Infantry Division
- Conflicts: World War II: Eastern Front; Western Front; Battle of Hürtgen Forest †

Leutnant Friedrich Lengfeld (29 September 1921 – 12 November 1944) was a Wehrmacht soldier during World War II. He was company commander of the 2nd Company of the 275th Infantry Division's Fusilier battalion and is known for sacrificing his life while trying to save a wounded American soldier who had stepped on a landmine.

== Biography ==
Lengfeld was born on 29 September 1921 in Grünfelde, East Prussia. His parents, and education, are unknown. Little is known about his early military career, except that the inscription of his dog tag (No. 1406 1. Geb.Jäg.Ers.Btl.98) suggests that he belonged to the staff of the Gebirgsjäger-Ersatz-Bataillon I./98 in Mittenwald, which was part of the 8th Mountain Division. Lengfeld was wounded several times on the Eastern Front and received awards.

In 1944, Lengfeld was assigned to the 275th Infantry Division established in France. Lengfeld was commander of the 2nd Company of the divisional Fusilier battalion of the 275th Infantry Division during the fighting at the Battle of Hürtgen Forest. This was used in November 1944 around the minefield (internal place name: Wilde Sau) and forester's house Hürtgen. On the afternoon of 2 November 1944, the German troops built a line of defense that led from the Wilde Sau minefield to the west side of the road. A machine gun nest protected the mine-free alley that now leads to the cemetery. The supply route for the American troops was the old Zweifaller Straße, via which heavy tracked vehicles could be brought to the front during the fighting. The attack on Hürtgen, which started from here on 2 November, was stopped a little later by the Germans in the area of the Wilde Sau minefield. The minefield stopped the advance of the American 109th Infantry Regiment.

On 3 November, the 116th Panzer Division "Greyhounds" recaptured the torn front between Schmidt and Hürtgen. On 4 November the counterattacks by the American armed forces began. Heavy fighting raged in the area between Vossenack and Schmidt, accompanied by artillery strikes and tank battles. The United States Army Air Corps took part in the ground fighting due to its air superiority, but had to discontinue air support due to the very bad weather. After heavy losses of the 109th Infantry Regiment, the front section was taken over by the 12th Infantry Regiment of the 4th US Infantry Division on 7 and 8 November. Lieutenant Lengfeld and his messenger, Hubert Gees, led a patrol to an American outpost that had not yet been reoccupied by the US Army. Around noon on 10 November, the German commanders opened a half-hour heavy artillery bombardment at the head of the forest and on the American front line southwest of Hürtgen. This was a fresh attempt to push the Americans back by whatever means available. Lieutenant Lengfeld's company was besieged by American troops (12th US Infantry Regiment). The strategically important forester's house changed hands several times during the battles.

On the night of 12 November, the American troops briefly retook the Hürtgen forester's lodge, but were repulsed by the Germans in the morning hours. In the morning of 12 November 1944, the German soldiers heard calls for help and screams of pain from the Wilde Sau minefield. It was a wounded American soldier who was calling for help on the embankment of the eastern road, in the middle of no man's land between the front lines. Lieutenant Lengfeld gave the order under no circumstances to shoot any American medics who might be approaching, so that they could rescue and treat the wounded soldier. Since around 10:30 a.m. local time the wounded soldier's calls for help continued even after hours, Lieutenant Lengfeld ordered his own paramedics to form a rescue team. He led this troop under the symbol of the Red Cross past his own tank mines, the location of which was relatively easy to see. When Lengfeld crossed the street at the level of the seriously wounded American, an anti-personnel mine tore him to the ground. The shrapnel effects of the anti-personnel mine caused serious internal injuries to Lengfeld. As soon as possible, he was under the leadership of a slightly injured NCO for dressing station Lukas mill and later taken to the main dressing station in Froitzheim, where his death was determined. Friedrich Lengfeld rests on the Düren-Rölsdorf war cemetery (final grave site: grave 38).

== Legacy ==
At the Hürtgen Cemetery of Honor, there is a memorial in his honor, which the Veterans Association of the 22nd US Infantry Regiment of the 4th Infantry Division had erected on 7 October 1994 in honor of Lengfeld. This and the memorial in honor of Karl-Heinz Rosch in the Netherlands are the only known memorials for German Wehrmacht soldiers that were erected by the opponents of the time.

=== The other soldier ===
There is no reliable information about the identity and fate of the wounded American soldier in the minefield. Friedrich Lengfeld's eyewitness and reporter, Hubert Gees, states in his eyewitness report that the wounded GI may have been able to be transported or walked. However, this first impression does not correspond to a profound medically performed triage. Gees speculates in his report that the wounded US soldier was able to save himself to the American lines before the area was recaptured by the German Wehrmacht on 13 November 1944.

== Gallery ==
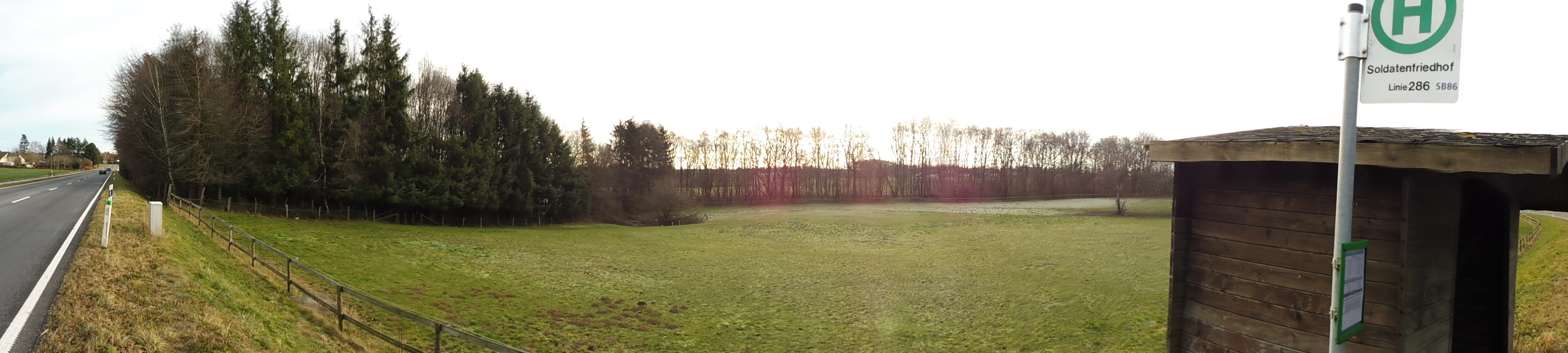
Friedrich Lengfeld's accident site near the Hürtgen war cemetery. The wounded American soldier was lying at the front edge of the forest near the road. The German rescue team crossed the street from the left (B399 - Höhenstraße 110, 52393 Hürtgenwald).

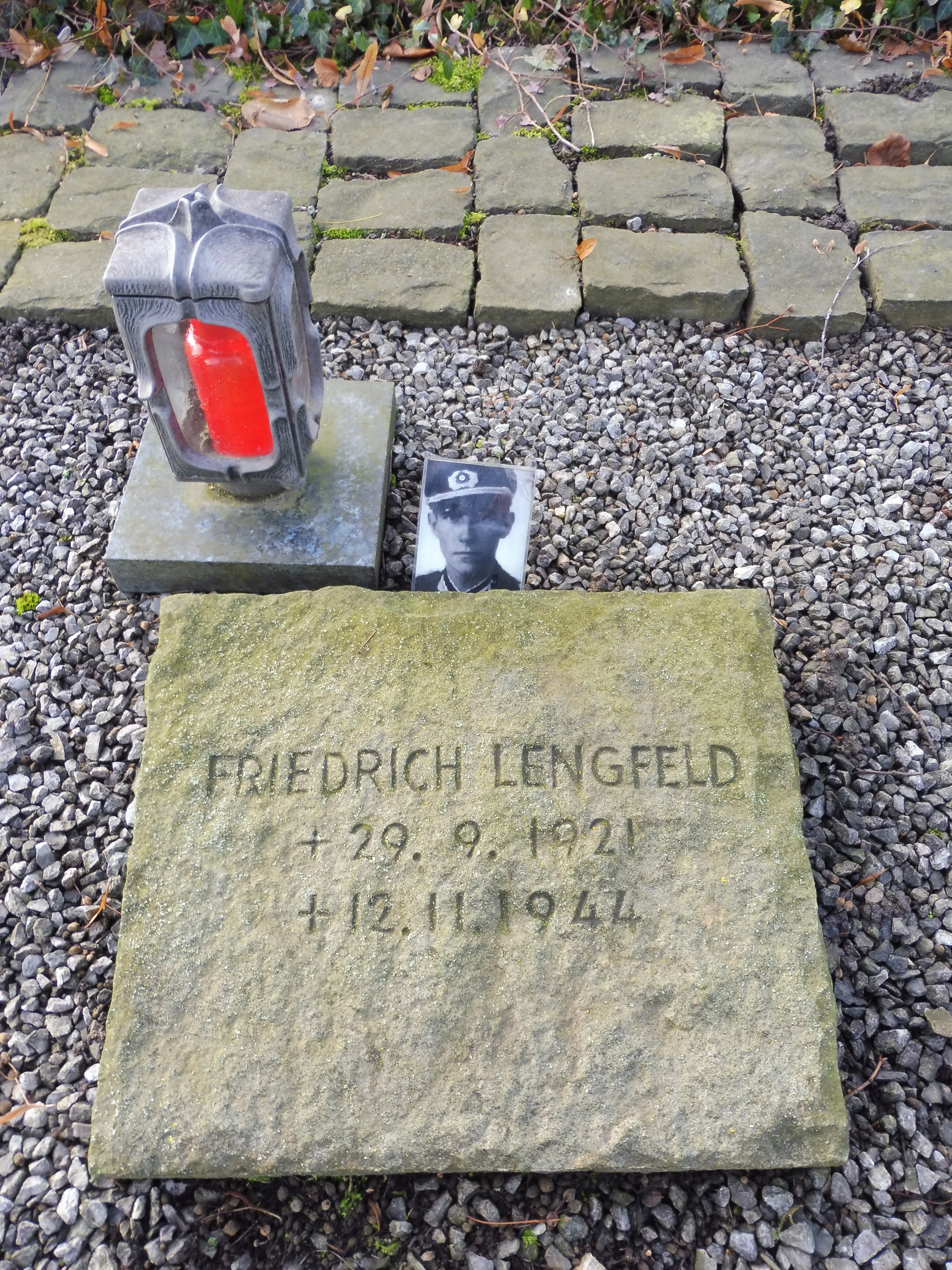
Grave site with portrait of Friedrich Lengfeld on the war cemetery (Düren-Rölsdorf cemetery)

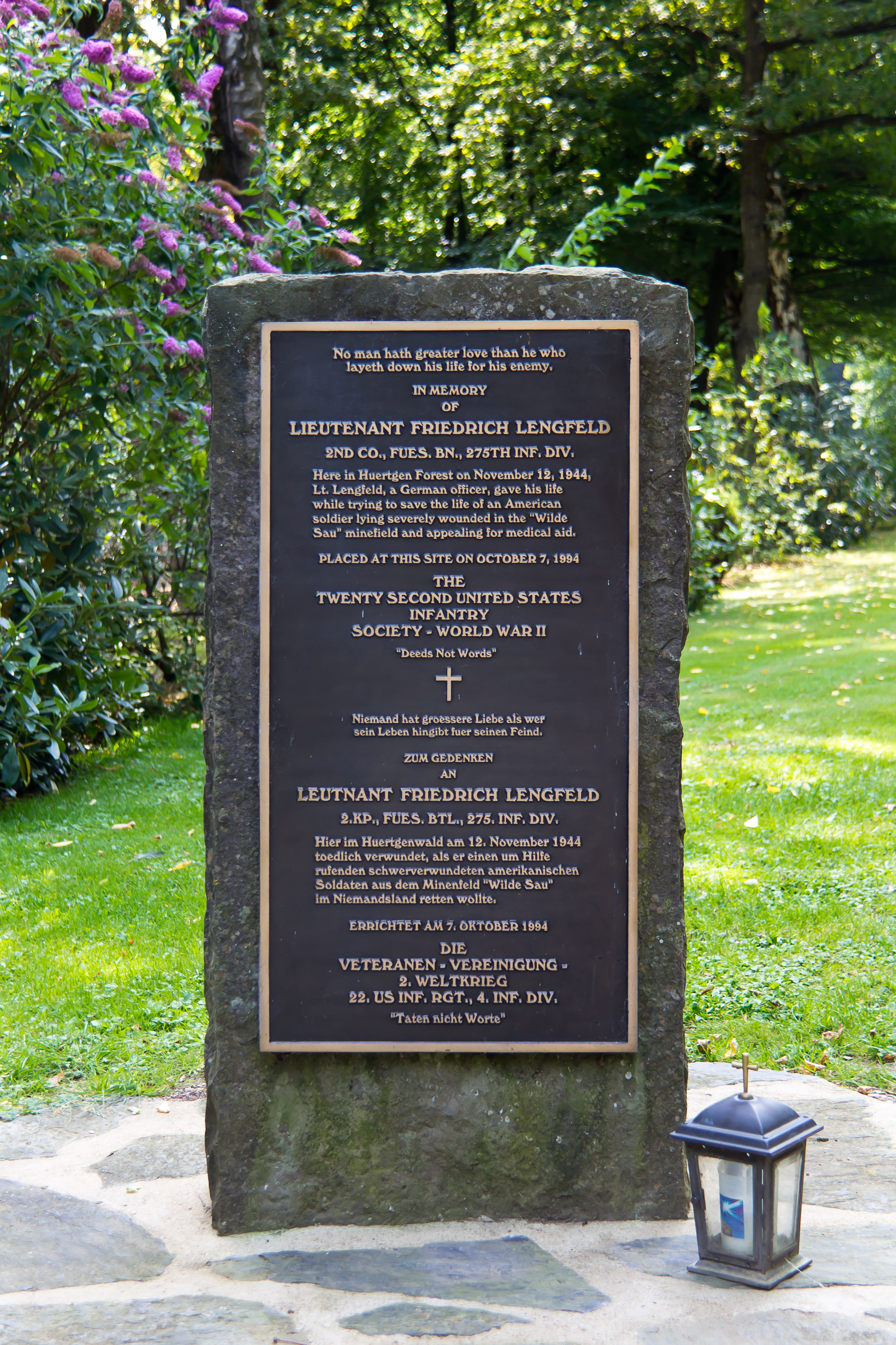
Memorial stone for Friedrich Lengfeld on the war cemetery in Hürtgen

== See also ==
- Karl-Heinz Rosch
