= Rolduc =

Monastery in Kerkrade, Netherlands

Coordinates: 50°52′04″N 6°04′54″E

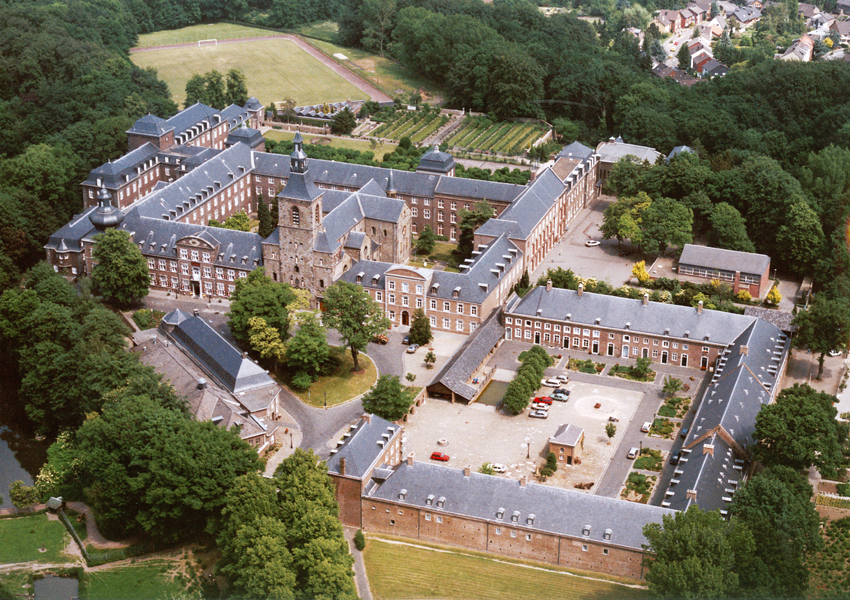
Rolduc Abbey, Kerkrade, Netherlands

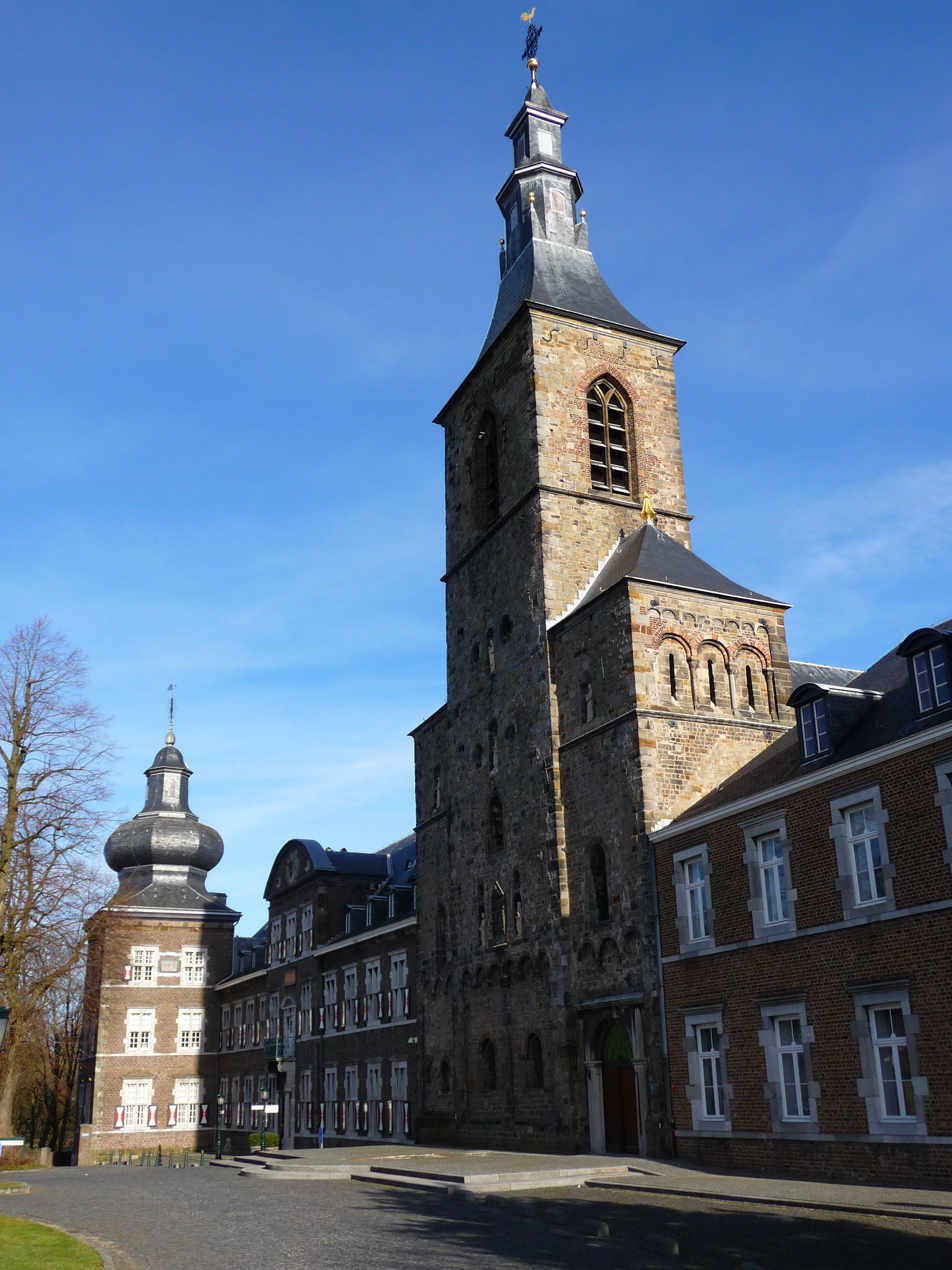
Rolduc

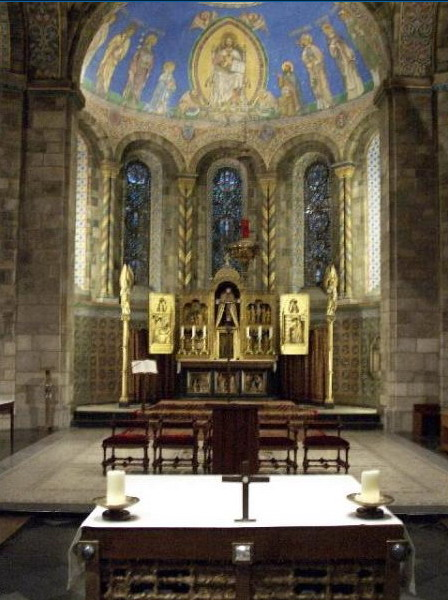
Rolduc abbey church. Interior

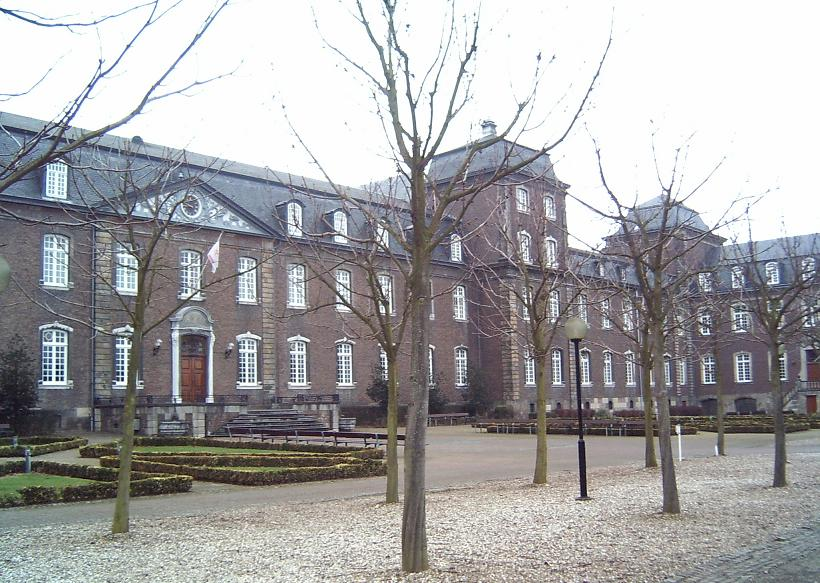
Rolduc. Moretti wing, 1753

Rolduc is a medieval abbey located on the edge of the town of Kerkrade in the far south-east of the Netherlands. It is today a Roman Catholic seminary with an affiliated conference center. The abbey is a rijksmonument (Dutch national heritage site). It features on the official list of 100 top Dutch heritage sites, drawn up in 1990 by what is today the Rijksdienst voor het Cultureel Erfgoed (National Cultural Heritage Service).

== History ==
In 1104, a young priest by the name of Ailbertus of Antoing founded an Augustinian abbey near the river Wurm in the Land of Rode donated by Adelbert of Sopenbergh (or Adalbert Count of Saffenberg). Ailbertus carried out his plan to found a religious house in the following years, employing his architectural knowledge, which appears to have already been employed in the construction of the chapel of Saint Médard. The abbey was called Kloosterrade, which later became 's-Hertogenrade (French: Rode-le-Duc or Rolduc), after the ducal castle that was built across the Wurm. The crypt was consecrated on 13 December 1108 by Otbert, Bishop of Liège, in the presence of Bruno de Bretten, Archbishop of Trier, and local lords. The bishop and the counts of Saffenberg granted the abbey several privileges: possession of property, the right to administer justice over their possessions, the right to preach the word of God, the right to elect their superior, and the right to administer certain sacraments.

Ailbertus led an austere life of fasting, a meager diet, prayers, vigils, and the simplest, even rigorous, attire (wearing a hair shirt). Having learned of this pious lifestyle, the Bishop Bouchard of Lechsgemund, offered him a position in the Diocese of Utrecht with a comfortable income. Ailbertus declined. In 1111, disagreeing with a monk about the direction the abbey should take, Ailbertus chose to leave rather than jeopardize its future. He then went to Thiérache, where he founded Clairfontaine Abbey near Vervins. Around 1122, Ailbertus decided to return to Rolduc to see how the abbey was doing. He never made it as he first decided to visit some friends and fell ill on the way. He died in Echten (now Sechtem, a hamlet in the municipality of Bornheim) near Bonn on 19 March 1123. He had wished to be buried at the abbey in Rolduc, but the inhabitants, struck by "some miracles" that occurred at the time of his death, opposed this and buried him in a chapel there. His body was returned to Rolduc in 1895 to be interred in the crypt where his sarcophagus remains today.

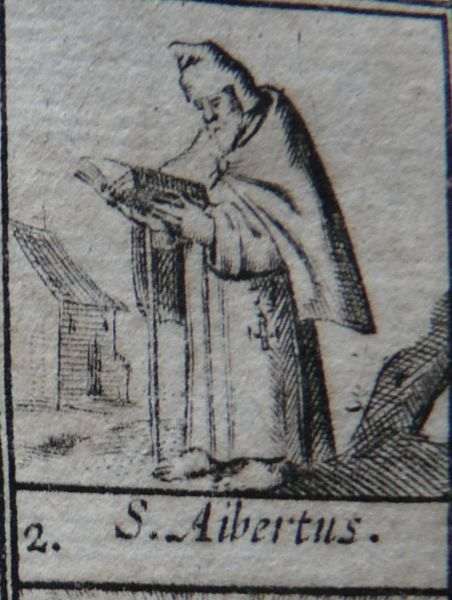
Ailbert of Antoing, engraved in a 1640 publication

In 1136 the land of Rode, including the abbey, became the property of the Duchy of Limburg. Kloosterrade was considered to be their family church. Several dukes of Limburg are buried at Rolduc, such as Walram III, whose cenotaph can be found in the nave of the church. During the 12th and 13th century the abbey flourished. Several other communities were founded by Kloosterrade. In 1250 the abbey owned more than 3,000 hectares of land.

During the 14th, 15th and 16th centuries times were harder for the abbey in both spiritual and material terms. The buildings were heavily damaged during the Eighty Years War. Materialistically, the abbey began to prosper again in the late 17th century when revenue was generated from the exploitation of coal mines. In around 1775, Rolduc employed 350 miners.

The abbey was dissolved by the French in 1796 and the buildings were not used for 35 years. In 1815, when the United Kingdom of the Netherlands was formed (see Vienna Congress), the border was drawn through the ancient land of Rode, separating the abbey from the castle. The eastern part (including the castle) became Prussian Herzogenrath and the western part (including the abbey) became part of the Dutch municipality of Kerkrade.

In the 19th century Rolduc became a famous boarding school run by Jesuits, and a seminary of the Diocese of Roermond. Many influential Dutch Roman Catholics (e.g. the writer Lodewijk van Deyssel and the social reformer Alphons Ariëns) were educated at Rolduc.

The former abbey is now a secondary school (Charlemagne College, formerly College Rolduc), a Roman Catholic seminary, and the Rolduc Congress Center.

== Description ==
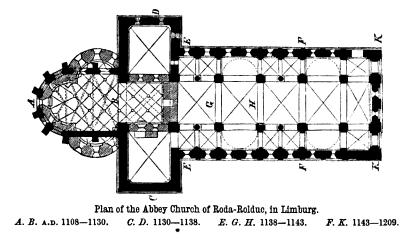
Abbey church.

The 12th century abbey church is an example of Mosan art. The crypt and the choir and chancel above have a cloverleaf pattern. The interior of both the church and the crypt contains richly carved capitals. Remarkable is the fact that the columns in the crypt all have a different design. In 1853, the young architect Pierre Cuypers was commissioned to restore the crypt and to reinstate as much as possible the original Romanesque fabric.

The cloisters are largely 18th century. The abbey has a richly decorated Rococo library with an important collection of books. During the Middle Ages, the Rolduc library was one of the most famous libraries in the Meuse region. The history of the abbey was recorded in the so-called Annales Rodenses, a chronicle about the years 1104 through 1157.

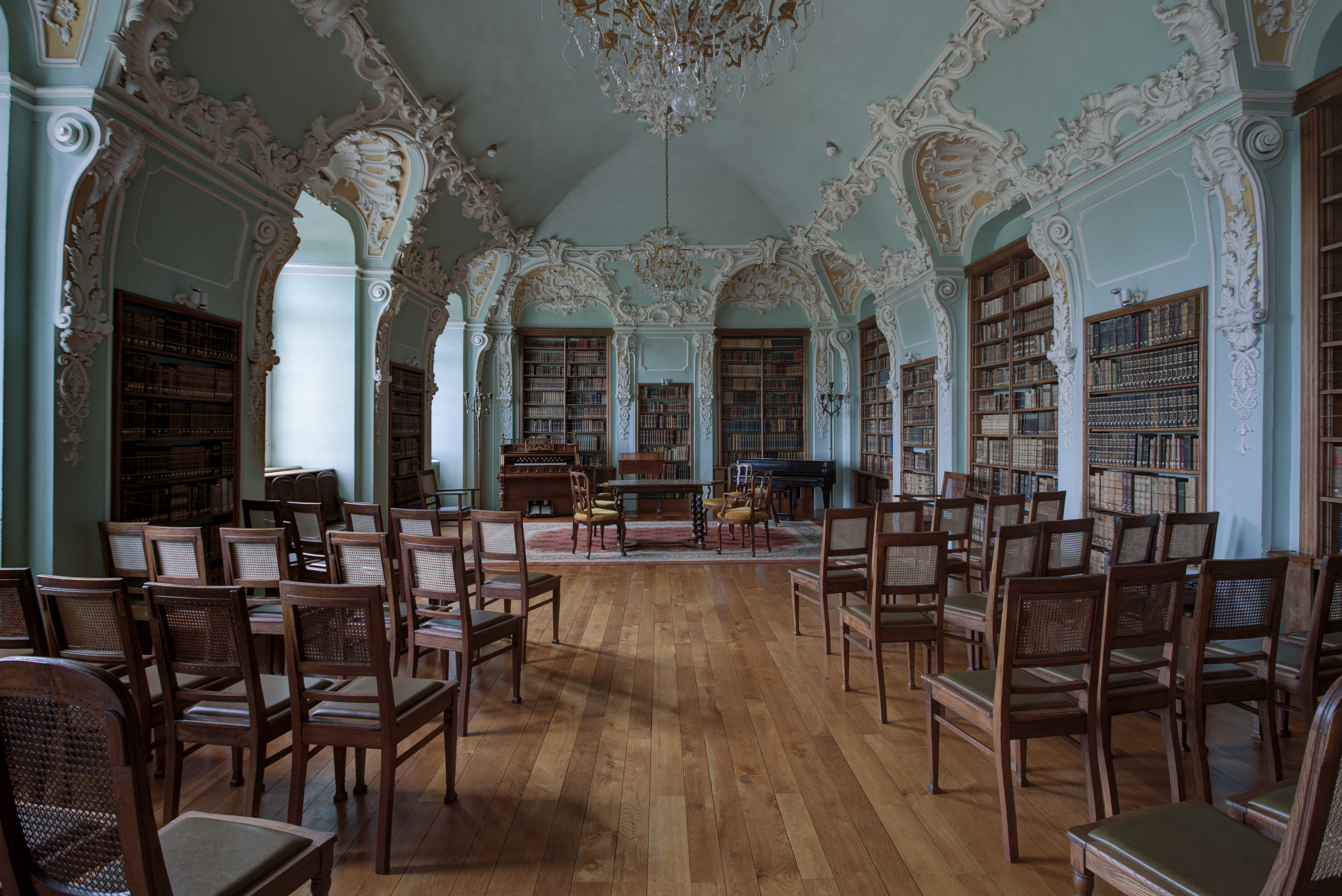
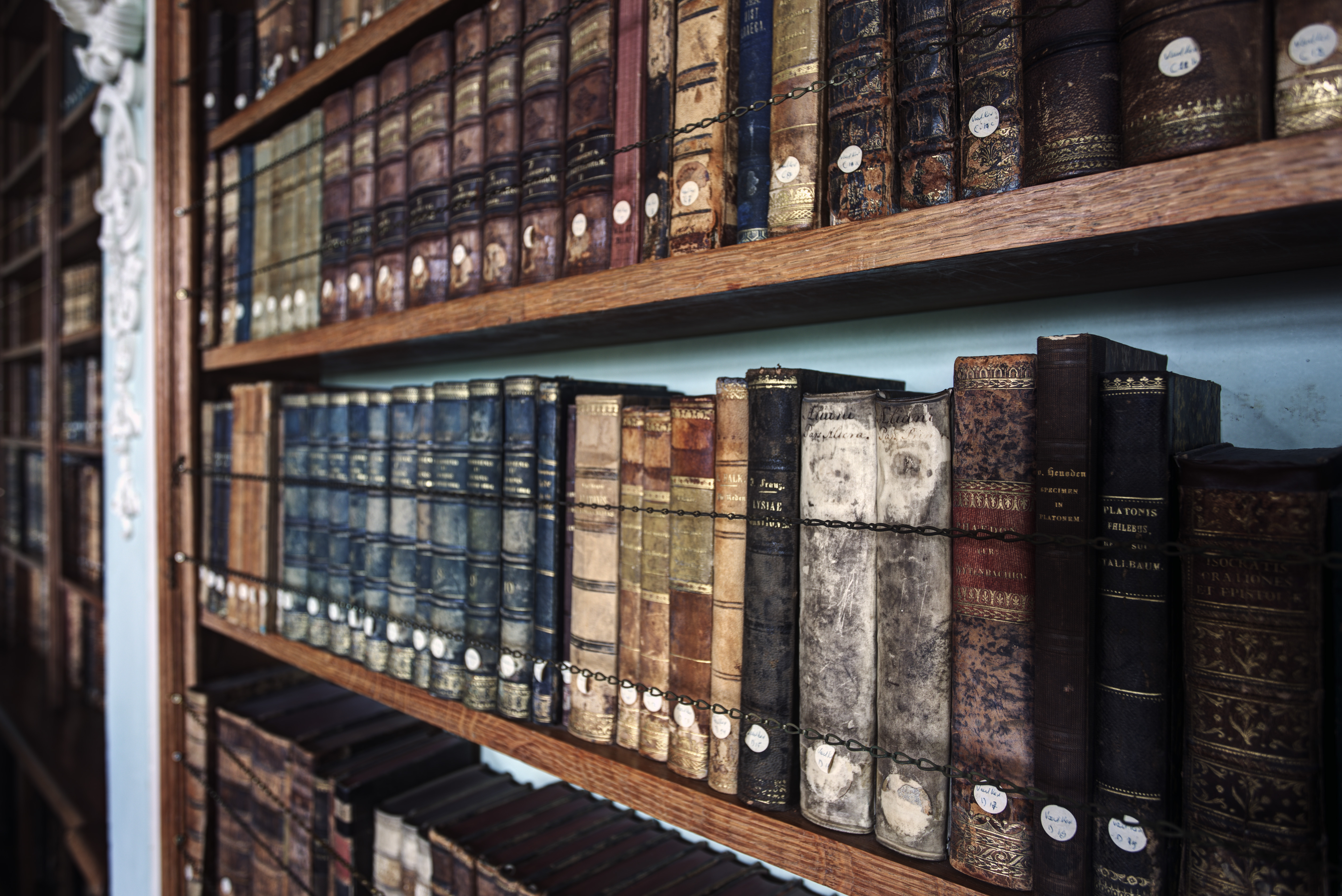
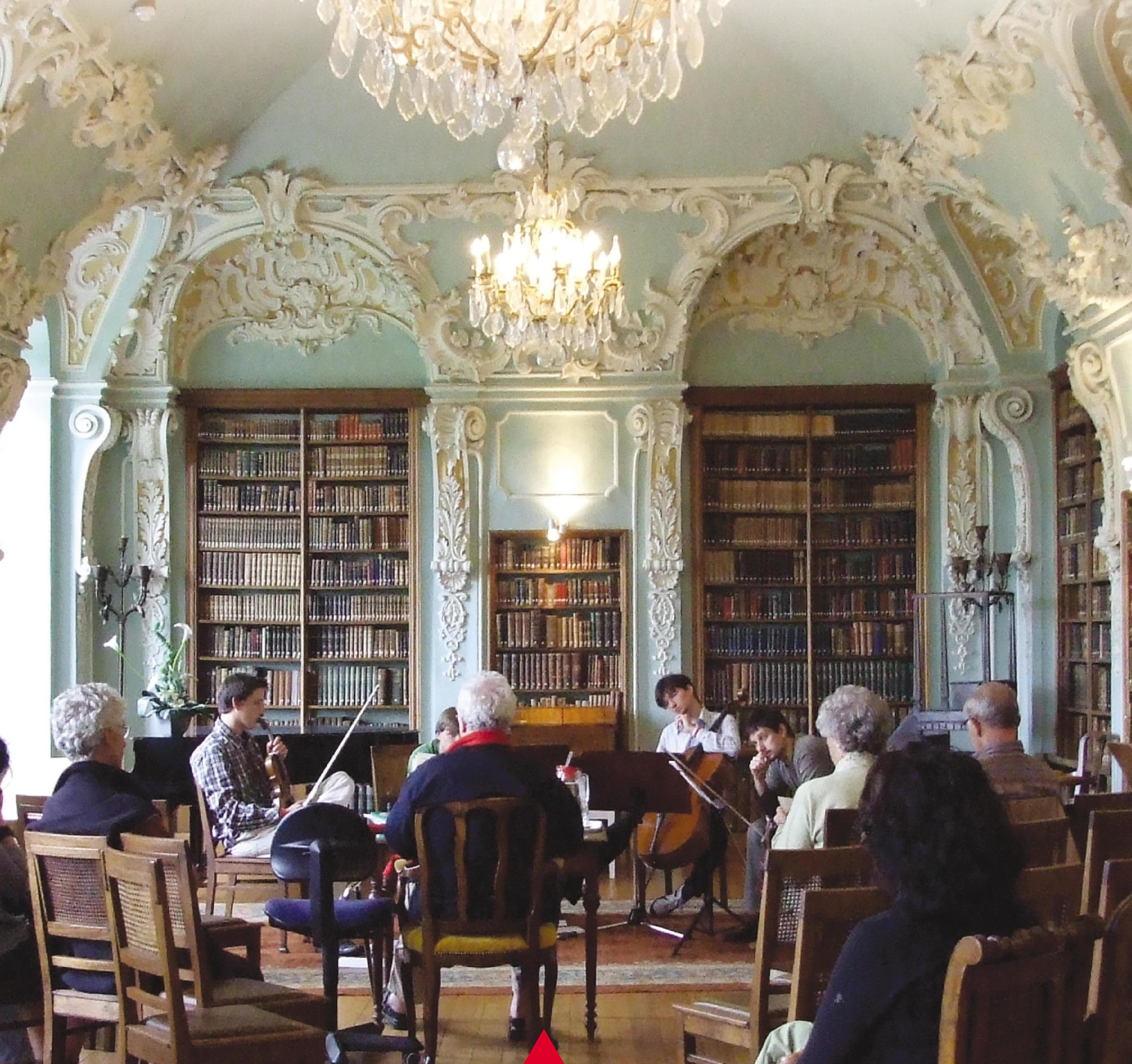

The interior painting above the altar is by the Nazarene movement painter Matthias Goebbels.

=== Monastery garden, cemetery, and wooded surroundings ===
Rolduc is located amidst a wooded area near the small river Worm. On its own grounds, there are the cloister courtyard (behind the abbey church, with a remnant of the Romanesque cloister), the monastery garden (with two garden houses dating from around 1700), and the walled monastery cemetery (with a neo-Gothic cemetery chapel with a Calvary group). In the immediate vicinity, noteworthy are a small grove with ponds, the valley of the Vrouwezijp, and several old avenues (including the Chemin d'Abbaye).

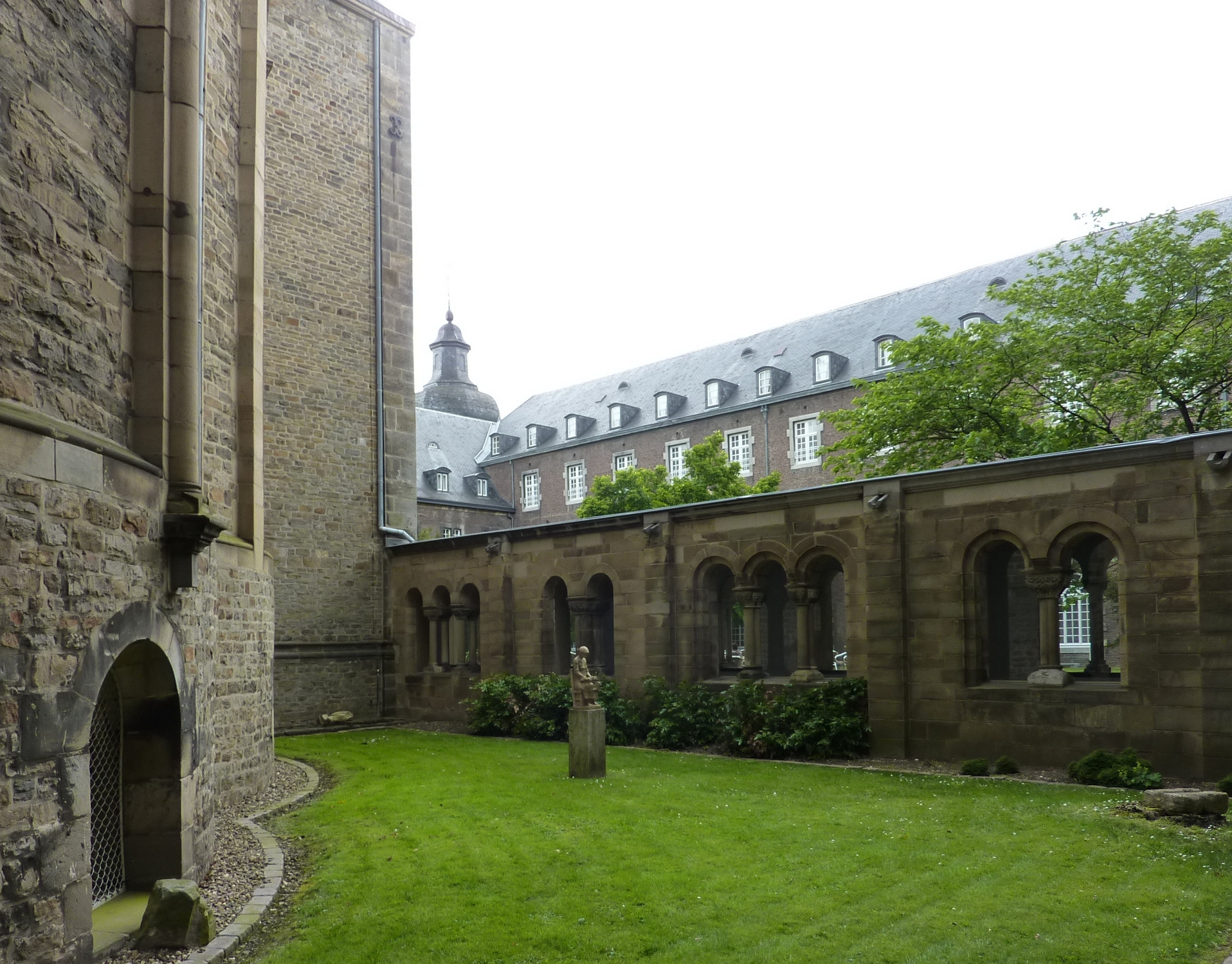
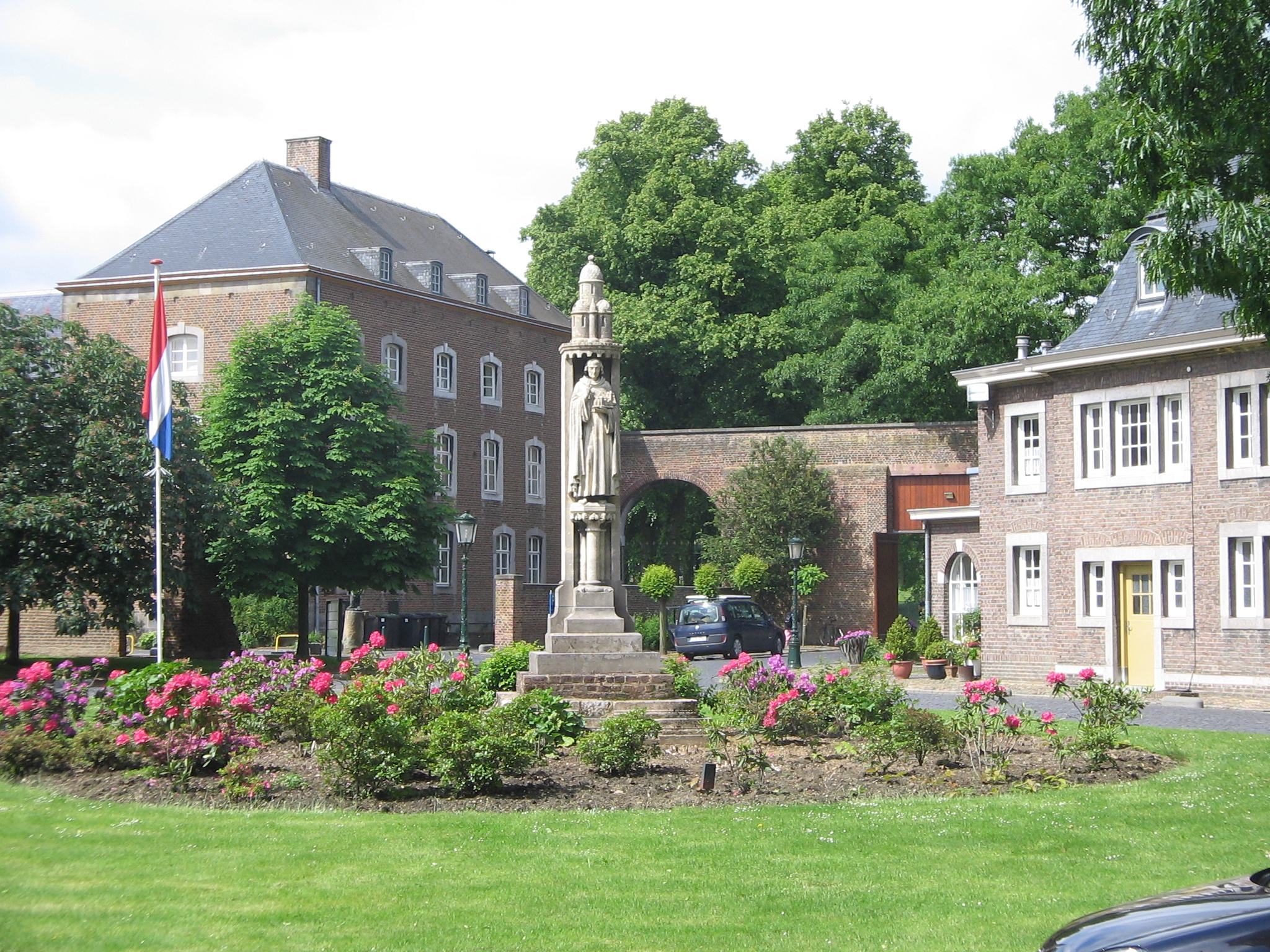
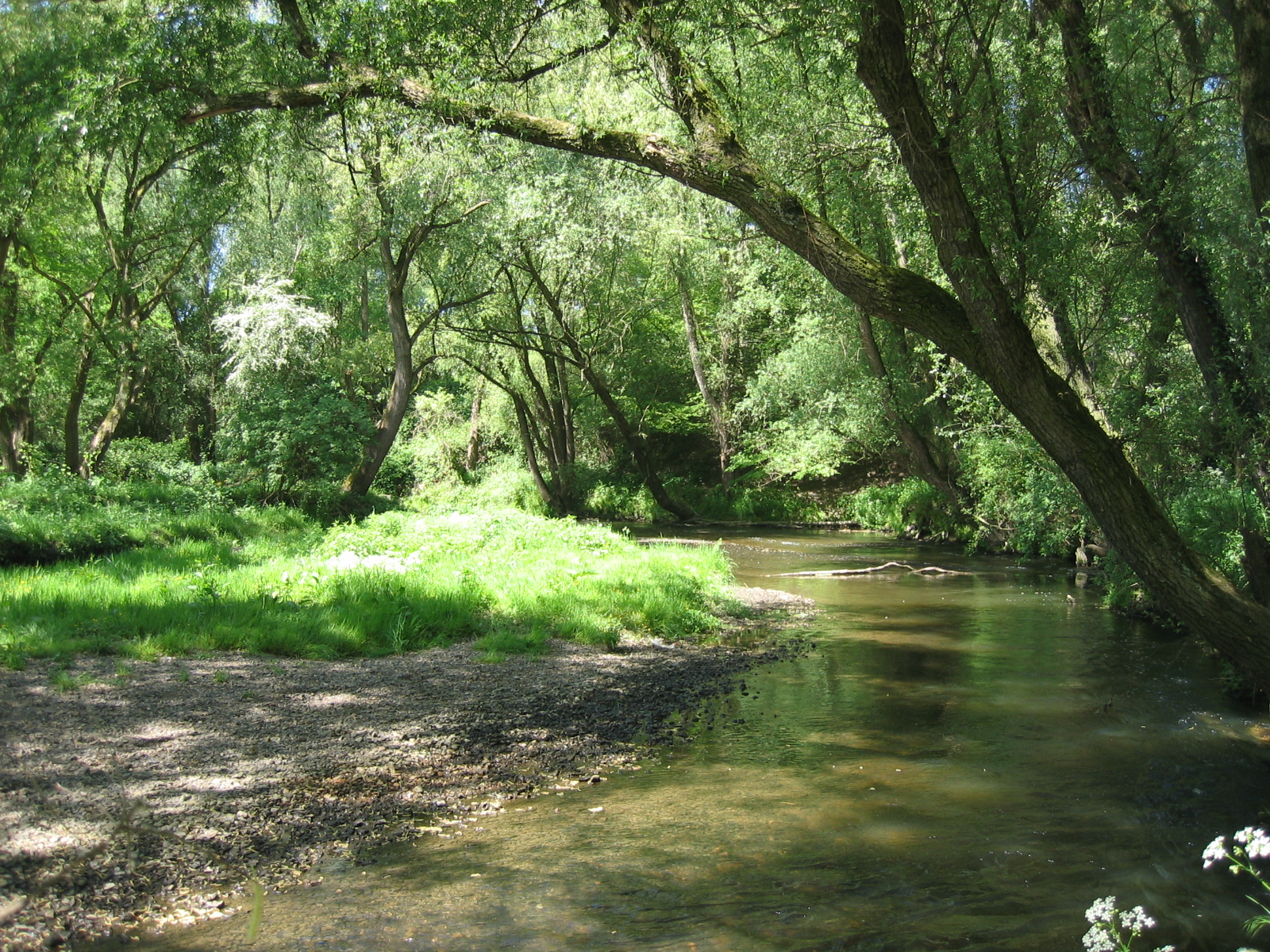
