= Paul Scheuerpflug =

- Born: 3 July 1896
- Died: 8 August 1945 (aged 49)
- Military career
- Allegiance: Nazi Germany
- Branch: Army (Wehrmacht)
- Rank: Generalleutnant
- Commands: 68th Infantry Division
- Conflicts: World War II
- Awards: Knight's Cross of the Iron Cross with Oak Leaves

Paul Scheuerpflug (3 July 1896 – 8 August 1945) was a German general during World War II who commanded the 68th Infantry Division. He was a recipient of the Knight's Cross of the Iron Cross with Oak Leaves of Nazi Germany.

Scheuerpflug was wounded 8 May 1945, and taken prisoner by Soviet troops. He died in a POW camp hospital at Auschwitz.

== Awards and decorations ==
- Iron Cross (1914) 2nd Class (22 September 1915 & 1st Class (27 January 1917))
- Clasp to the Iron Cross (1939) 2nd Class (25 June 1940) & 1st Class (4 July 1941)
- Knight's Cross of the Iron Cross with Oak Leaves
  - Knight's Cross on 6 September 1942 as Oberst and commander of Infanterie-Regiment 116
  - 791st Oak Leaves on 16 March 1945 as Generalleutnant and commander of 68. Infanterie-Division

Military offices
Preceded by Generalleutnant Hans Schmidt	Commander of 68. Infanterie-Division; 25 October 1943 - 8 May 1945	Succeeded by None
