= 275th Infantry Division =

- 275. Infanterie-Division
- Active: Dec 1943 - Nov 1944; Mar 1945 - Apr 1945
- Country: Nazi Germany
- Branch: Army
- Type: Infantry
- Size: Division
- Engagements: World War II: France & Western Germany; Eastern Germany

Commanders
- 10 Dec 1943 - 22 Nov 1944: Hans Schmidt
- Mar 1945 - Apr 1945: Hans Schmidt

The 275th Infantry Division (275. Infanterie-Division) was an infantry division of the German Army during World War II.

== Divisional history ==
The 275th was formed in late 1943, in France, from remnants of the 223rd Infantry Division. It was commanded by Generalleutnant Hans Schmidt from 10 December 1943 until it was disbanded on 22 November 1944.

Early in the Normandy landings, (June 6, 1944) two Infantry battalions, the Fusilier battalion, one artillery battalion and an engineer company were sent to the Normandy area. The rest of the division followed in mid July.

The 275th suffered heavy losses in the Falaise pocket and was transferred to Aachen for refitting. Here it was re-enforced with the Luftwaffe fortress battalions XII and XX. The 275th was transferred to the Düren - Hürtgenwald area where it suffered severe losses. On November 12 1944 Lt. Friedrich Lengfeld lost his life to a German landmine while trying to save a wounded American soldier. The remnants of the division were incorporated into the 344th Infantry Division after the Battle of Hürtgen Forest.

The 275th Infantry Division was reformed in January 1945, near Flensburg, and was transferred to the Eastern front where it was destroyed in the Halbe pocket in 1945.

== Order of battle ==
The following is the 275th order of battle in mid-1944;

- Grenadier Regiment 983
- Grenadier Regiment 984
- Grenadier Regiment 985
- Panzerjäger Abteilung 275
- Artillerie Regiment 275
- Pioniere Battalion 275
- Fusilier Battalion 275
- Supply Train / Signals Troops 275
