= Baesweiler =

- Town
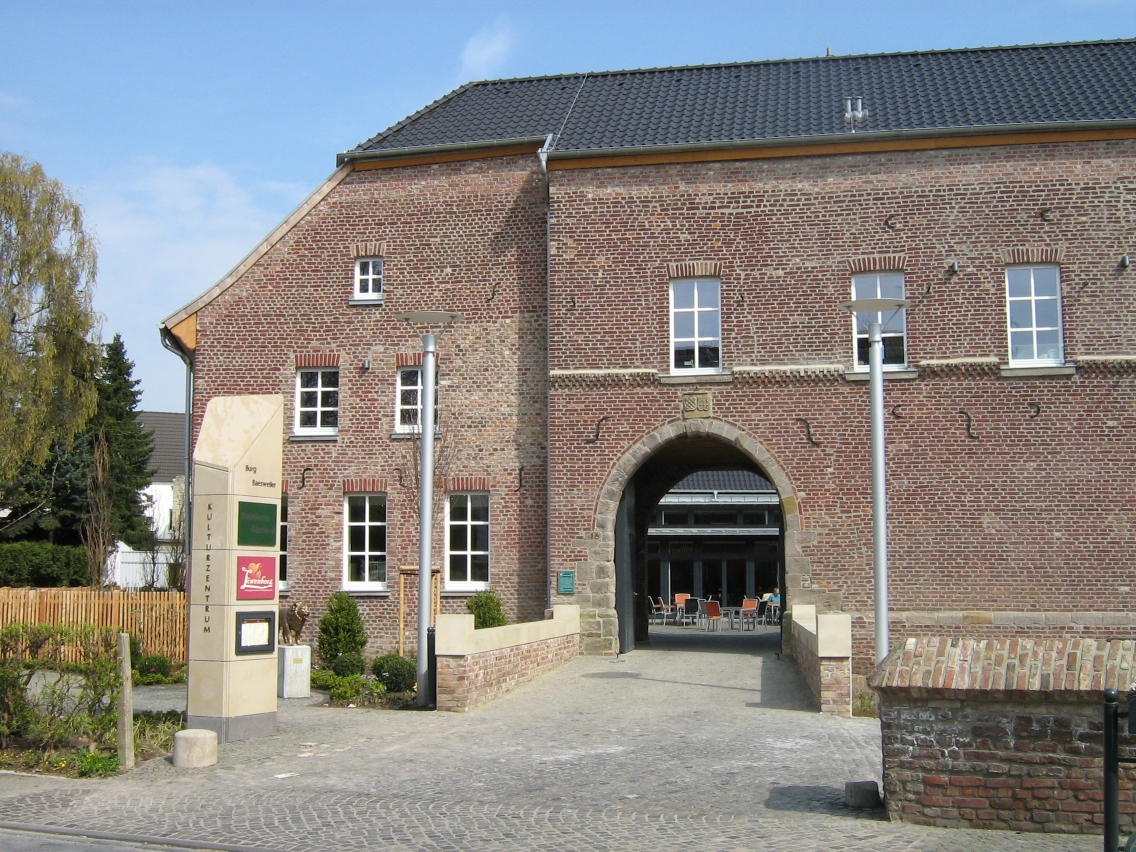
- Castle Baesweiler, front

- Coat of arms

- Location of Baesweiler within Aachen district
- Interactive map of Baesweiler
- Location within Germany Location within North Rhine-Westphalia
- Coordinates: 50°54′N 6°11′E
- Country: Germany
- State: North Rhine-Westphalia
- Admin. region: Köln
- District: Aachen
- Subdivisions: 7

Government
  - Mayor (2025–30): Pierre Froesch (CDU)

Area
  - Total: 27.84 km^{2} (10.75 sq mi)
- Elevation: 130 m (430 ft)

Population (2025-12-31)
  - Total: 29,038
  - Density: 1,043/km^{2} (2,701/sq mi)
- Time zone: UTC+01:00 (CET)
  - Summer (DST): UTC+02:00 (CEST)
- Postal codes: 52499
- Dialling codes: 02401
- Vehicle registration: AC
- Website: www.baesweiler.de

Baesweiler (German pronunciation: [ˈbaːsvaɪlɐ]) is a municipality in the district of Aachen, North Rhine-Westphalia, Germany.

== Geography ==
Baesweiler is located approximately 20 km north-east of Aachen.

=== Neighbouring municipalities ===
- Geilenkirchen
- Linnich
- Aldenhoven
- Alsdorf
- Herzogenrath
- Übach-Palenberg

=== Division of the municipality ===
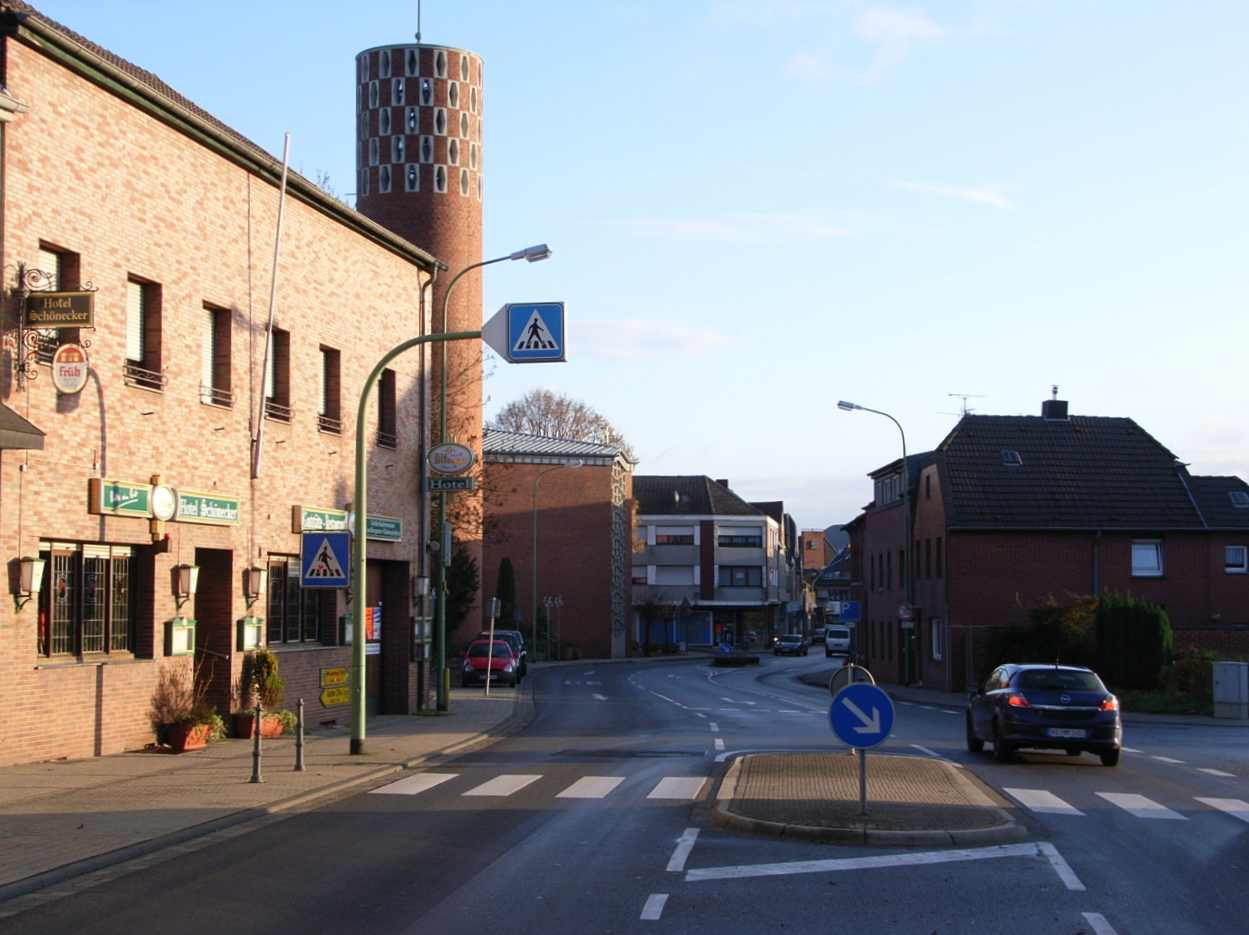
Setterich

The municipality has seven subdivisions since a local government reform in 1972 (populations as of January 2007):

- Baesweiler (13,864 inhabitants)
- Beggendorf (1,667 inhabitants)
- Floverich (408 inhabitants)
- Loverich (1,255 inhabitants)
- Oidtweiler (2,731 inhabitants)
- Puffendorf (441 inhabitants)
- Setterich (7,794 inhabitants)

== History ==
On 22 August 1371, the Battle of Baesweiler took place between the armies of duke Wenceslaus I of Brabant on one hand, and dukes William II of Jülich and Edward of Guelders on the other. Wenceslaus suffered a humiliating defeat, and was captured by William II of Jülich afterwards. Edward of Guelders was killed not soon after the battle was over.

== Politics ==
The current mayor is Pierre Froesch of the CDU, who has been serving as mayor of Baesweiler since 2020. In the 2025 election he was reelected with 86,2 % of the vote.

=== City council ===
After the 2025 local elections, the Baesweiler city council is composed as follows:

Party	Votes	%	+/-	Seats	+/-
Christian Democratic Union (CDU)	7,028	60.2	▼2.4	23	▲1
Social Democratic Party (SPD)	1,562	13.4	▼6.1	5	▼3
Alternative for Germany (AfD)	1,558	13.4	New	5	New
Alliance 90/The Greens (Grüne)	860	7.4	▼3.8	3	▼1
The Left (Linke)	366	3.1	▲0.2	1	±0
Free Democratic Party (FDP)	276	2.4	▼1.5	1	±0
Anton Dinslaken	18	0.2	New	0	New
Valid votes	11,668	98.5			
Invalid votes	173	1.5			
Total	11,841	100.0		38	±0
Electorate/voter turnout	21,128	56.0			
Source: City of Baesweiler

== Population ==
Historical population

Year	Pop.	±% p.a.
1950	13,268	—
1965	24,647	+4.22%
1970	24,288	−0.29%
1975	23,231	−0.89%
1980	23,517	+0.25%
1985	24,005	+0.41%
1990	24,442	+0.36%

Year	Pop.	±% p.a.
1995	25,707	+1.01%
2000	27,434	+1.31%
2005	28,058	+0.45%
2010	27,898	−0.11%
2015	26,819	−0.79%
2020	27,319	+0.37%
2025	29,038	+1.23%

Source: Landesdatabank Nordrhein-Westfalen (1965-2025)

== Twin towns – sister cities ==
Baesweiler is twinned with:

- Montesson, France (1990)

== Notable people ==
- Matthias Goebbels (1836–1911), priest and artist
- Franz Loogen (1919–2010), pioneer of cardiology in Germany
- Ralph Gunesch (born 1983), footballer
