= Platißbach =

River in Germany

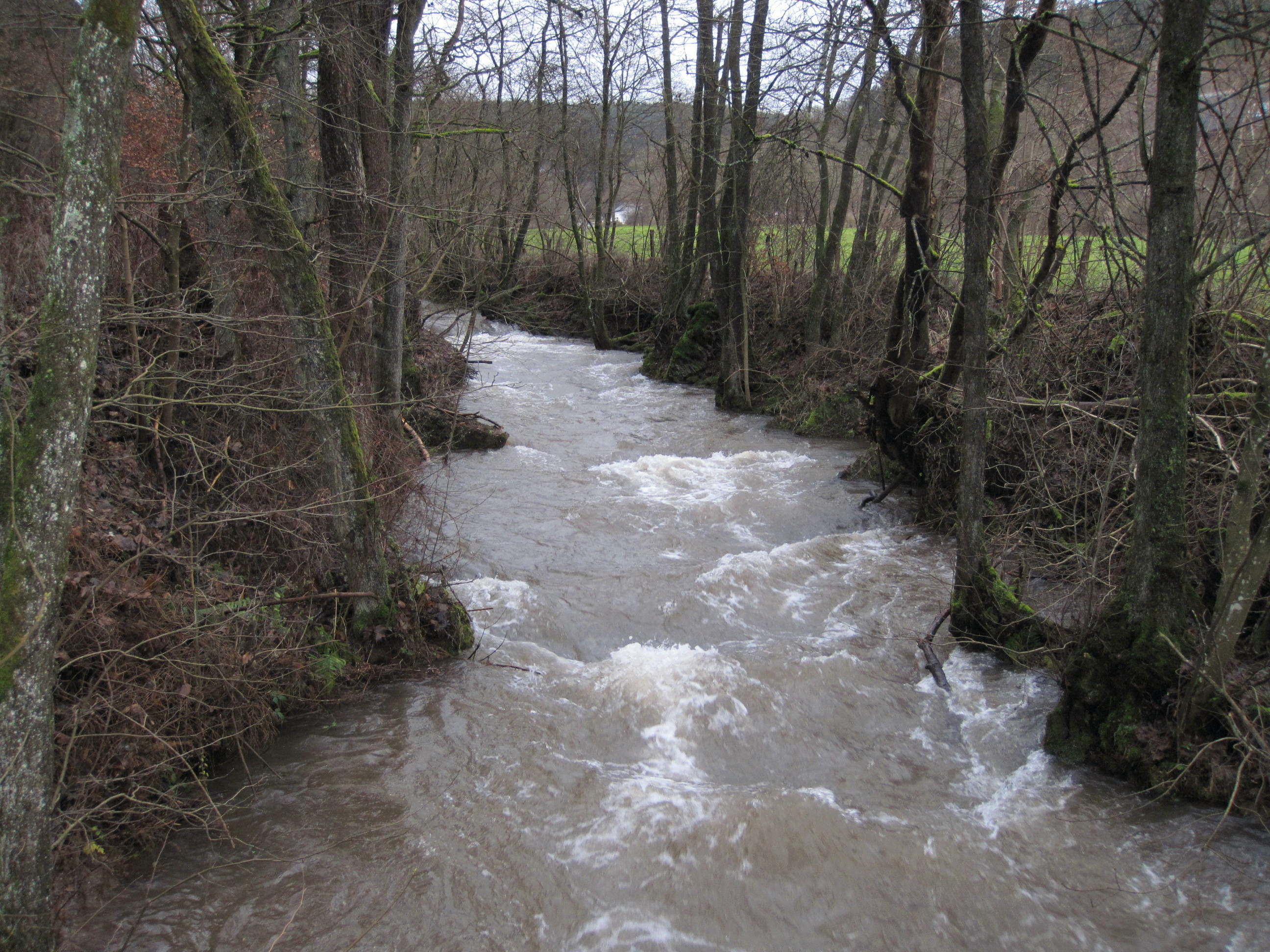
- Platißbach by the campsite

Location
- Country: Germany
- State: North Rhine-Westphalia
- Location: Eifel, District of Euskirchen
- Reference no.: DE: 282284

Physical characteristics
- Source
  - location: northwest of Hollerath
  - coordinates: 50°27′59″N 6°22′08″E
  - elevation: ca. 605 m above sea level (NHN)
- Mouth
  - location: in Hellenthal into the Olef
  - coordinates: 50°29′30″N 6°26′18″E
  - elevation: ca. 403 m above sea level (NHN)
- Length: 7.416 km (4.608 mi)
- Basin size: 38.564 km^{2} (14.890 sq mi)

Basin features
- Progression: Olef→ Urft→ Rur→ Meuse→ North Sea

The Platißbach is a roughly seven-kilometre-long (4.3 mi), southern and orographically right-hand tributary of the River Olef in the municipality of Hellenthal in Germany.

== Course ==
The Platißbach rises in the High Fens-Eifel Nature Park in the North Eifel natural region of the Hollerath Plateau. Its source lies about 2.5 kilometres (1.6 mi) northwest of the village of Hollerath and one kilometre (0.6 mi) north of the Belgian border at a height of about 605 m.

The Platißbach initially flows in a northern direction. After about one kilometre (0.6 mi) it collects an unnamed stream from the left and changes direction to head east. On reaching the B 265 it changes course again and flows parallel to the road in a northwesterly direction to its mouth. On its way it flows through the Platißbach Valley Nature Reserve. The Platißbach picks up other tributaries from both sides, near Platiß (a district of Hellenthal), the only village it passes, at a height of about 422 m, it is joined by its main tributary, the Prether Bach. In Hellenthal it empties into the Urft tributary, the Olef, at about 403 m.

== Catchment and tributaries ==
The catchment of the Platißbachs is 38.6 km^{2} (14.9 sq mi) in area and drains over the Olef, Urft, Rur, Meuse and Hollands Diep into the North Sea.

Name	Left/right tributary	Length [km]	Catchment [km²]	Distance from mouth [km]	GKZ
Kaisersiefen	right	0.5		5.4	282284-112
Eschsiefen	right	2.4		4.6	282284-12
Langersiefen	right	2.1		4.1	282284-14
Kammersiefen	left	1.1		3.8	282284-16
Mehlensiefen	left	1.0		3.5	28228418
Prether Bach	right	10.2	24.893	2.1	282284-2
Drees Bach	right	1.6		1.1	282284-94
Speissiefen	left	1.2		0.5	282284-96

== See also ==
- List of rivers of North Rhine-Westphalia
