= Merzbach =

River in Germany

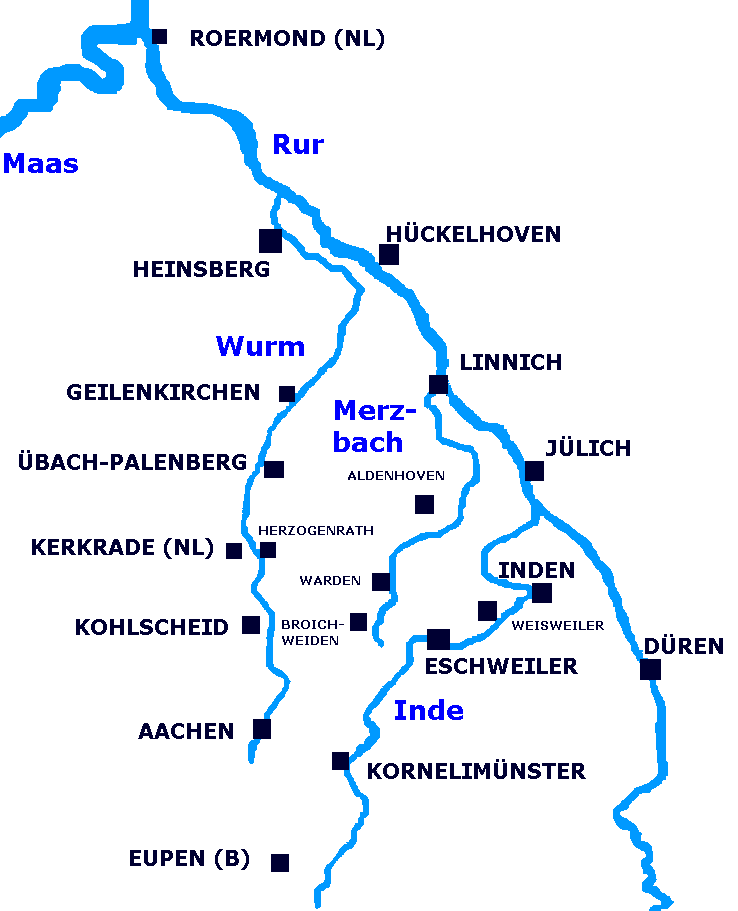
- Map of Merzbach River, in the Rur Basin

Location
- Country: Germany
- State: North Rhine-Westphalia

Physical characteristics
- Mouth
  - location: Rur in Linnich
  - coordinates: 50.9887°N 6.2713°E
- Length: 28.4 km (17.6 mi)

Basin features
- Progression: Rur→ Meuse→ North Sea

The Merzbach is a small river located in North Rhine-Westphalia, western Germany.

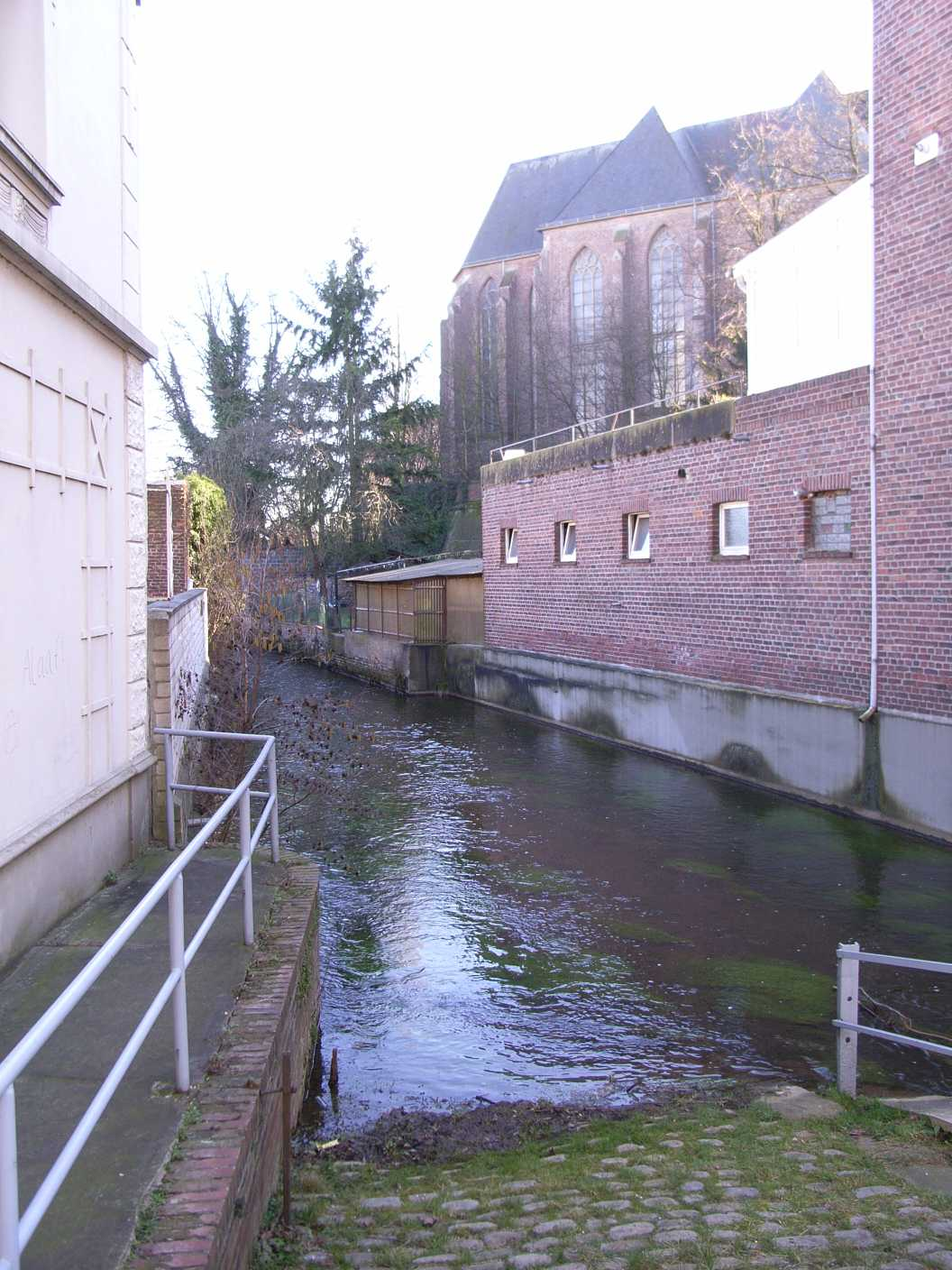
Merzbach River in Linnich

== Geography ==
The mouth of the Merzbach is at the town of Linnich, where it becomes a western tributary of the Rur/Roer. The Rur/Roer is a tributary of the Meuse (Dutch: Maas).

== See also ==
- List of rivers of North Rhine-Westphalia
