= Kuttenbach =

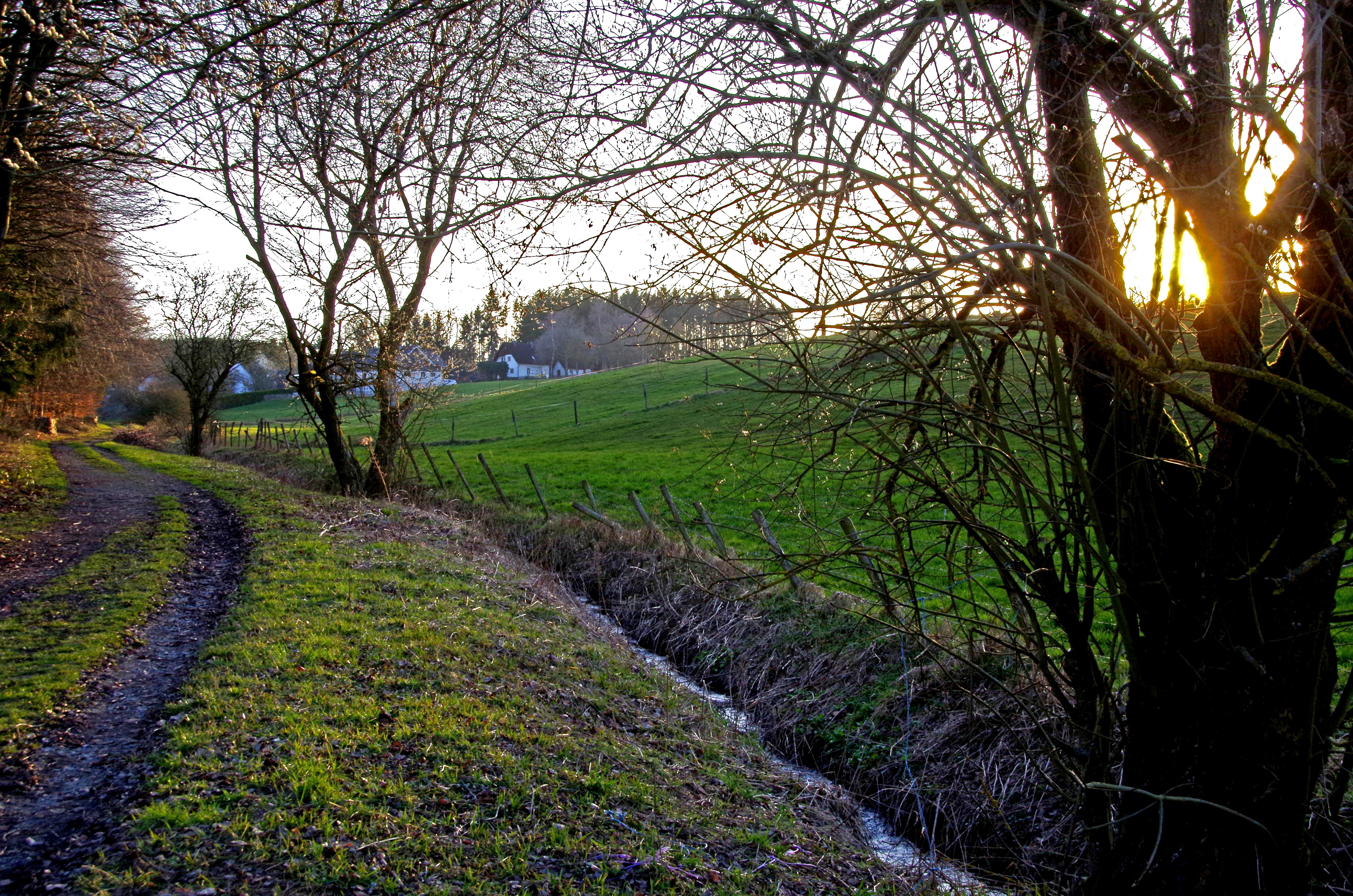

Location
- Country: Germany
- Location: Eifel, North Rhine-Westphalia, Euskirchen
- Reference no.: DE: 282252

Physical characteristics
- Source
  - location: North of Krekel
  - coordinates: 50°28′44″N 6°31′34″E
  - elevation: 601.5 m above sea level (NHN)
- Mouth
  - location: Near Urft into the Urft
  - coordinates: 50°30′47″N 6°34′03″E
  - elevation: 399.8 m above sea level (NHN)
- Length: 5.274 km
- Basin size: 4.488 km²

Basin features
- Progression: Urft→ Rur→ Meuse→ North Sea
- Landmarks: Villages: Kall

The Kuttenbach is a 5.3 kilometre-long, orographically left-hand tributary of the Urft in North Rhine-Westphalia, Germany, in the municipality of Kall.

== Geography ==
The Kuttenbach rises north of Krekel at a height of 601.5 m above sea level (NHN) in the nature reserve of the Sistiger Heide, which is also called Krekel Heath (‘’Krekeler Heide’’). From here on the stream flows constantly northeastwards and, after a short distance, reaches the village of Diefenbach. Its valley then separates the villages of Gillenberg on the right and Steinfelderheistert on the left. Soon is slopes become wooded and, on the right, is the nature reserve of Laubwald am Kuttenbach below the village of Steinfeld with Steinfeld Abbey on the upper step of the hillside. The stream finally empties from the left into the Urft between the villages of Urft and Sötenich at river kilometre 22.3.
