= Olef =

River in Germany

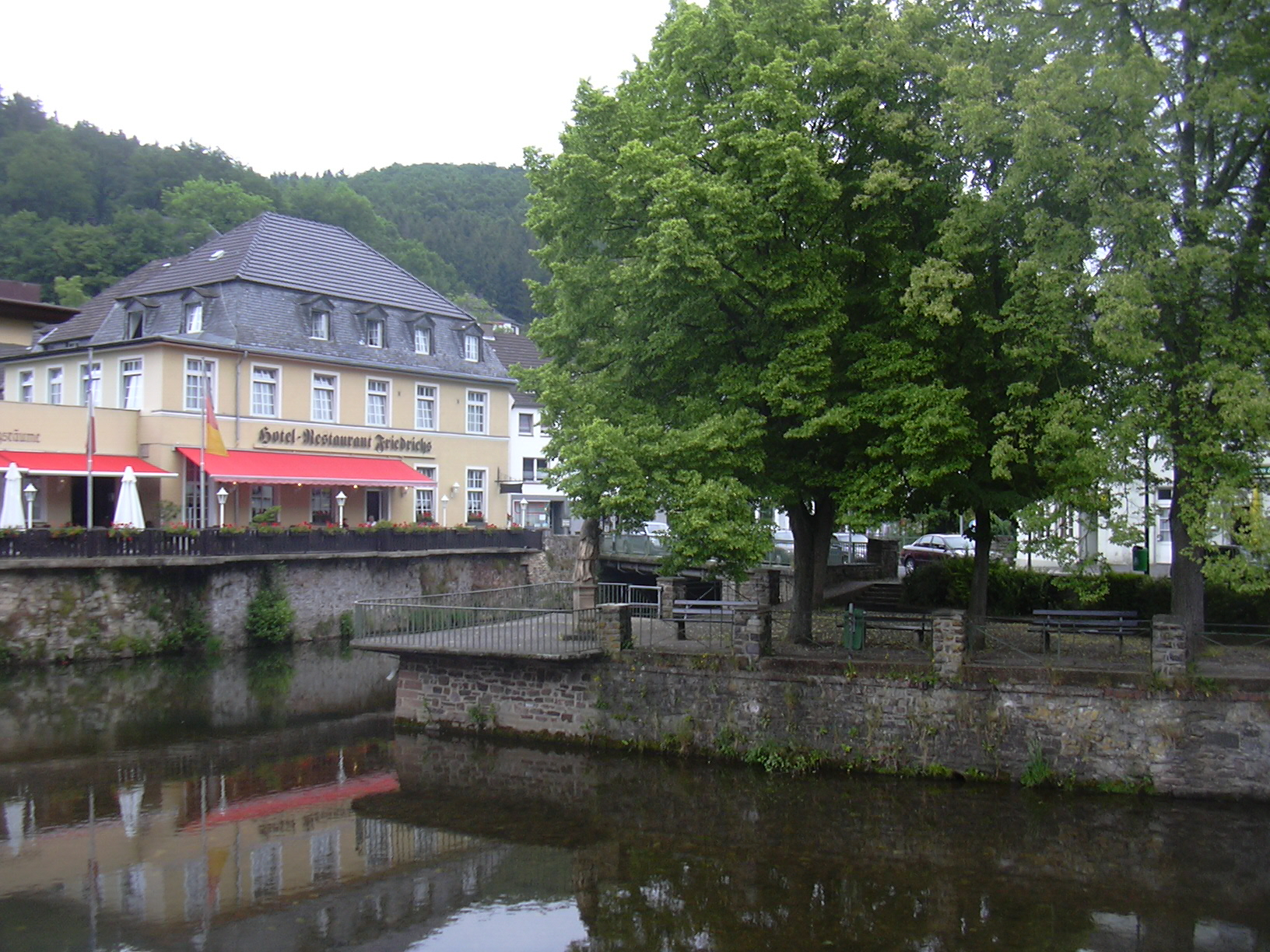
- Confluence of the Olef and the Urft in Gemünd

Location
- Countries: Germany and Belgium
- Reference no.: DE: 28228

Physical characteristics
- Source
  - location: West of Ramscheid
  - coordinates: 50°26′28″N 6°22′35″E
  - elevation: ca. 639 m above sea level (NHN)
- Mouth
  - location: In Gemünd into the Urft
  - coordinates: 50°34′21″N 6°30′01″E
  - elevation: ca. 334 m above sea level (NHN)
- Length: 27.9 km
- Basin size: 196.073 km^{2}

Basin features
- Progression: Urft→ Rur→ Meuse→ North Sea
- Waterbodies: Reservoirs: Olef Reservoir
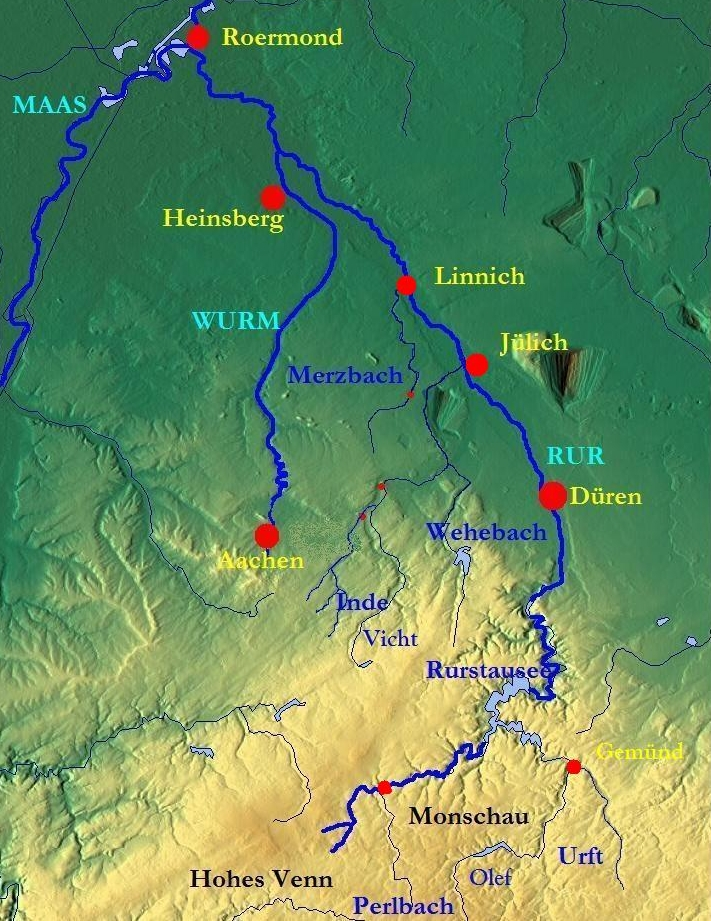
- The Olef, tributary of the Urft

The Olef is a river in Liège, Belgium and North Rhine-Westphalia, Germany. It is 27.9 kilometres (17.3 mi) long and a left-hand tributary of the Urft. It flows through the Eifel Mountains in the western part of the Germany and eastern part of Belgium.

== Geography ==
The Olef rises on the Ramscheider Höhe, near the Zitter Forest, about 2.2 km (1.4 mi) southwest of Hollerath at an elevation of 639 m above sea level (NHN), immediately on the state border. From here it flows initially northwest and through the woods of the Dreiherren Wald. The valley of the Olef forms the state border here which runs along the river. From its confluence with the Wiesbach it enters Germany. It then forms inter alia, the eastern boundary of the safety zones of the Elsenborn Military Training Area. The river course changes direction in a wide arc to head east.

In the next section the Olef flows through the Schleiden Forest (Forst Schleiden) and is impounded to create the Olef Reservoir in front of Hellenthal. In Hellenthal it is joined from the right and southwest by the Platißbach. At the end of the village of Hellenthal, near Kirschseiffen, the river turns north. At the northern edge of Blumenthal it picks up the Reifferscheider Bach from the right. Other villages en route are Oberhausen, Schleiden, Olef, Nierfeld and Gemünd. Here the Olef discharges into the Urft from the left at a height of 334 m above NHN.

Along its 27.9-kilometre-long route the Olef descends through 335 metres, which represent an average riverbed gradient of 12 ‰. It drains an area of 196.073 km^{2} (75.704 sq mi)

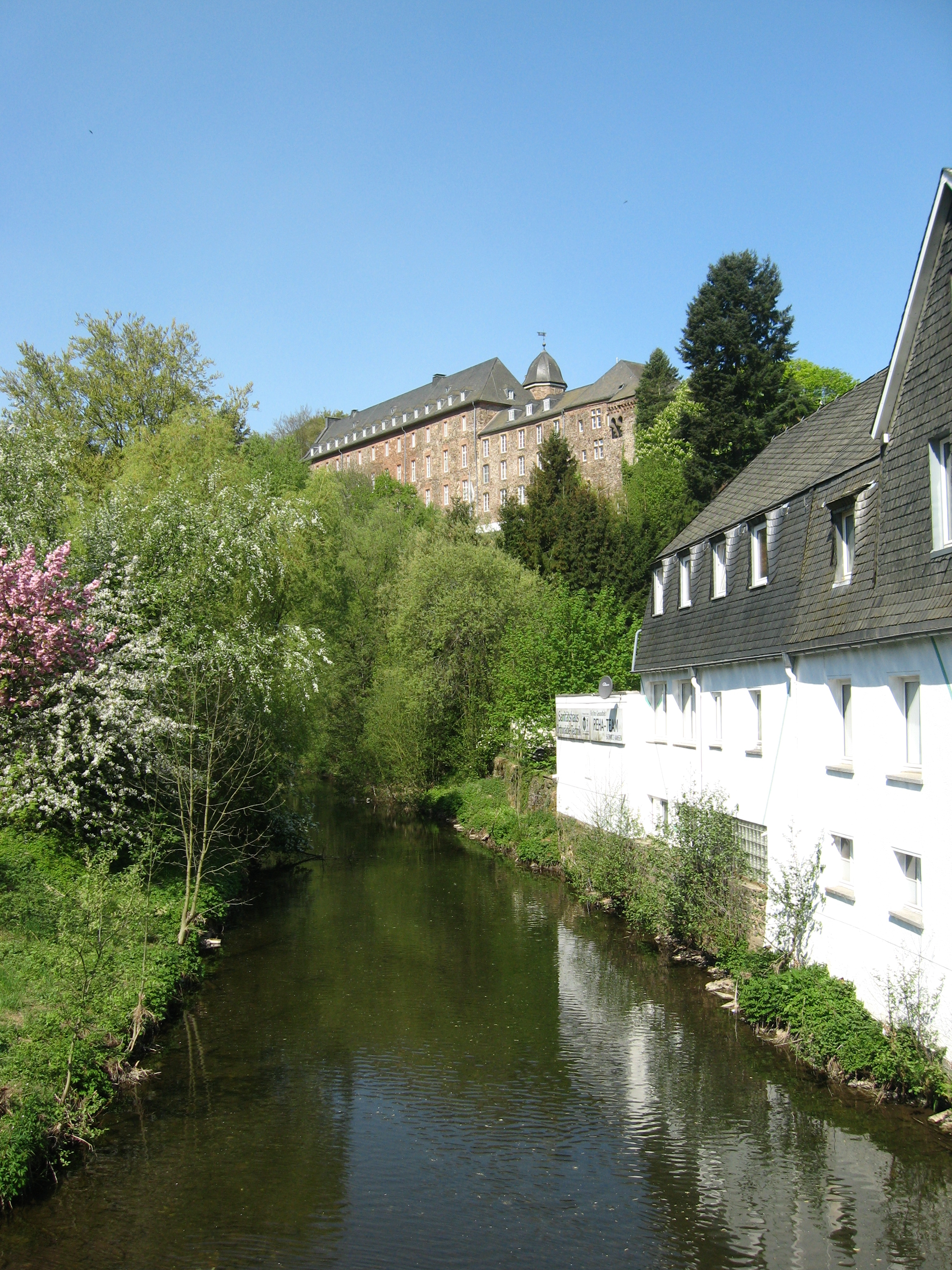
The Olef in Schleiden

=== Tributary streams ===
- Jansbach – 4.7 km long, left-hand tributary at 560 m above NHN
- Troglichtenbach – 2.9 km long, left-hand tributary
- Rathssiefen – 1.7 km long, right-hand tributary
- Merlenbach – 1.4 km long, right-hand tributary at 486 m above NHN
- Wiesbach – 5.8 km long, left-hand tributary at 481 m above NHN
- Reiffelbach – 1.8 km long, left-hand tributary at 479 m above NHN
- Kürteborn – 0.7 km long, right-hand tributary discharging into the Olef Reservoir at 465 m above NHN
- Lehrbach – 1.1 km long, right-hand tributary discharging into the Olef Reservoir at 465 m above NHN
- Birkensiefen – 1.5 km long, left-hand tributary
- Hesselbach – 1.8 km long, left-hand tributary discharging into the Olef Reservoir at 465 m above NHN
- Hesselbach – 1.2 km long, right-hand tributary discharging into the Olef Reservoir at 465 m above NHN
- Engelmannssiefen – 0.9 km long, left-hand tributary
- Jüngselbach – 2.5 km long, left-hand tributary discharging into the Olef Reservoir at 465 m above NHN
- Schürenter Siefen – 0.5 km long, left-hand tributary
- Tössiefen – 0.8 km long, right-hand tributary discharging into the Olef Reservoir at 465 m above NHN
- Gammelsbach – 1.0 km long, left-hand tributary
- Moderbach – 1.1 km long, right-hand tributary discharging into the Olef Reservoir at 465 m above NHN
- Bernerssiefen – 0.8 km long, left-hand tributary
- Kohlsiefen – 1.3 km long, left-hand tributary
- Platißbach – 7.4 km long, right-hand tributary in Hellenthal at 403 m above NHN
- Hintersiefen – 0.9 km long, right-hand tributary
- Reifferscheider Bach – 13.7 km long, right-hand tributary in Blumenthal at 387 m above NHN
- Mühlenseifen – 1.4 km long, right-hand tributary
- Rinkenbach – 2.9 km long, right-hand tributary in Oberhausen at 379 m above NHN
- Holzbach – 1.9 km long, left-hand tributary
- Hellesbach – 2.3 km long, left-hand tributary near Oberhausen at 375 m above NHN
- Scheidebach – 2.2 km long, right-hand tributary near Wiesgen at 374 m above NHN
- Holgenbach – 1.3 km long, right-hand tributary
- Dieffenbach – 7.3 km long, left-hand tributary in Schleiden at 363 m above NHN
- Höddelbach – 4.3 km long, left-hand tributary in Schleiden at 362 m above NHN
- Rosselbach – 2.1 km long, right-hand tributary near Schleiden at 357 m above NHN
- Selbach – 2.6 km long, right-hand tributary near Olef at 351 m above NHN
- Paffenbach – 1.4 km long, left-hand tributary
- Frohnbach – 1.1 km long, right-hand tributary
- Dehlenbach – 2.2 km long, right-hand tributary
- Tränkelbach – 1.6 km long, right-hand tributary

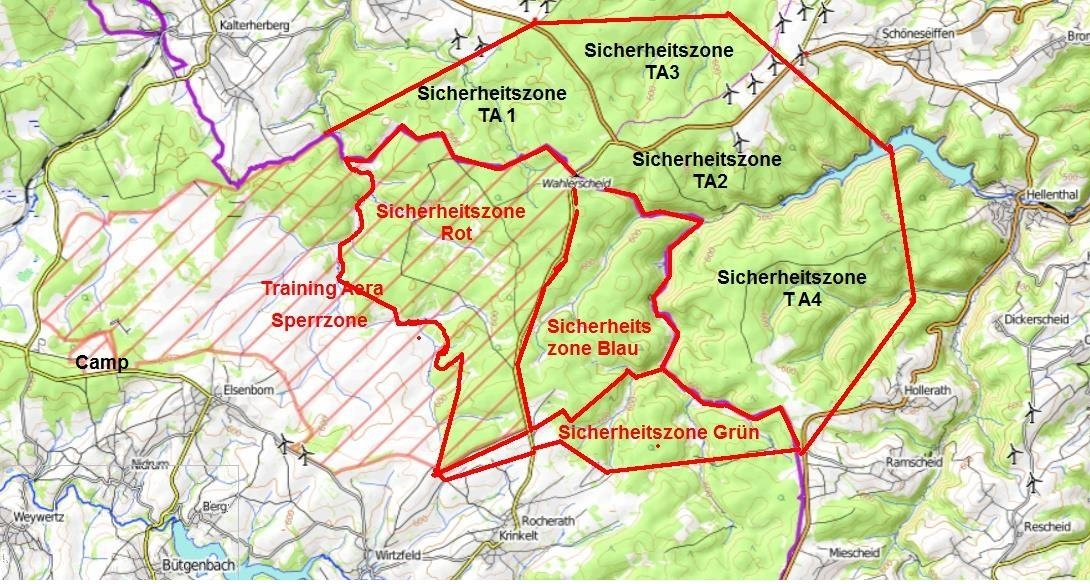
Training and security areas on the Olef and Olef Reservoir
