= Rinnebach =

Rinnebach may refer to:

- Rinnebach (Helme), a river of Thuringia, Germany, tributary of the Helme
- Rinnebach (Ohebach), a river of Hesse, Germany, tributary of the Ohebach
- Rinnebach (Rur), a river of North Rhine-Westphalia, Germany, tributary of the Rur
