= Tetz =

Coordinates: 50.9667°N 6.3167°E

- suburb
- Interactive map of Tetz

Area
  - Metro: 3.05 km^{2} (1.18 sq mi)

Population (May2011)
  - suburb: 1,444
- Postal code: 52441
- Area code: 02462

Tetz is the second-largest district in the city of Linnich, Düren district, North Rhine-Westphalia, Germany.

== History ==
Originally Tetz was a Romano - Celtic settlement. The name is attributed to a "Deciacum", a "Good Roman." Through different linguistic transformations, that name became Titzich, then Titze, and finally Tetz.

Between the villages of Boslar and Tetz, remains of a former Roman manor were found. In the Middle Ages, Tetz first belonged to the Counts of Jülich. After several ownership changes, Tetz finally came into the possession of the Lords of Brachel. The last owner of the castle, Baron Maximilian Freiherr von Brachel, died in 1964.

Tetz once had a church, the holy Consecrated Lambertus, that dated to 1291. It was destroyed by German soldiers in WW2 before their withdrawal and the occupation by American troops. The reconstruction of the church continued into the 1950s.

== Clubs ==
Because of the municipal reorganization in 1969, the former municipality of Tetz is now part of the town of Linnich. The town has grown steadily in recent decades by the construction of numerous new business and residential areas. Many clubs have become established. There are modern sports facilities and a multipurpose hall, the Rurauenhalle, which hosts comedy acts and important meetings. Some of the other clubs include:

- FC turf sports Tetz
- Carnival society "Fidele Brothers" Tetz
- Church choir of St. Joseph Tetz
- Schutterij St. Lambertus Tetz
- Tennis club green and white Tetz
- TTC Tetz
- Gymnastic club Tetz 1975 e. V.

== References and Links ==
Tetz - City of Linnich
