= Reifferscheid Castle =

Coordinates: 50°28′36.50″N 6°27′59″E

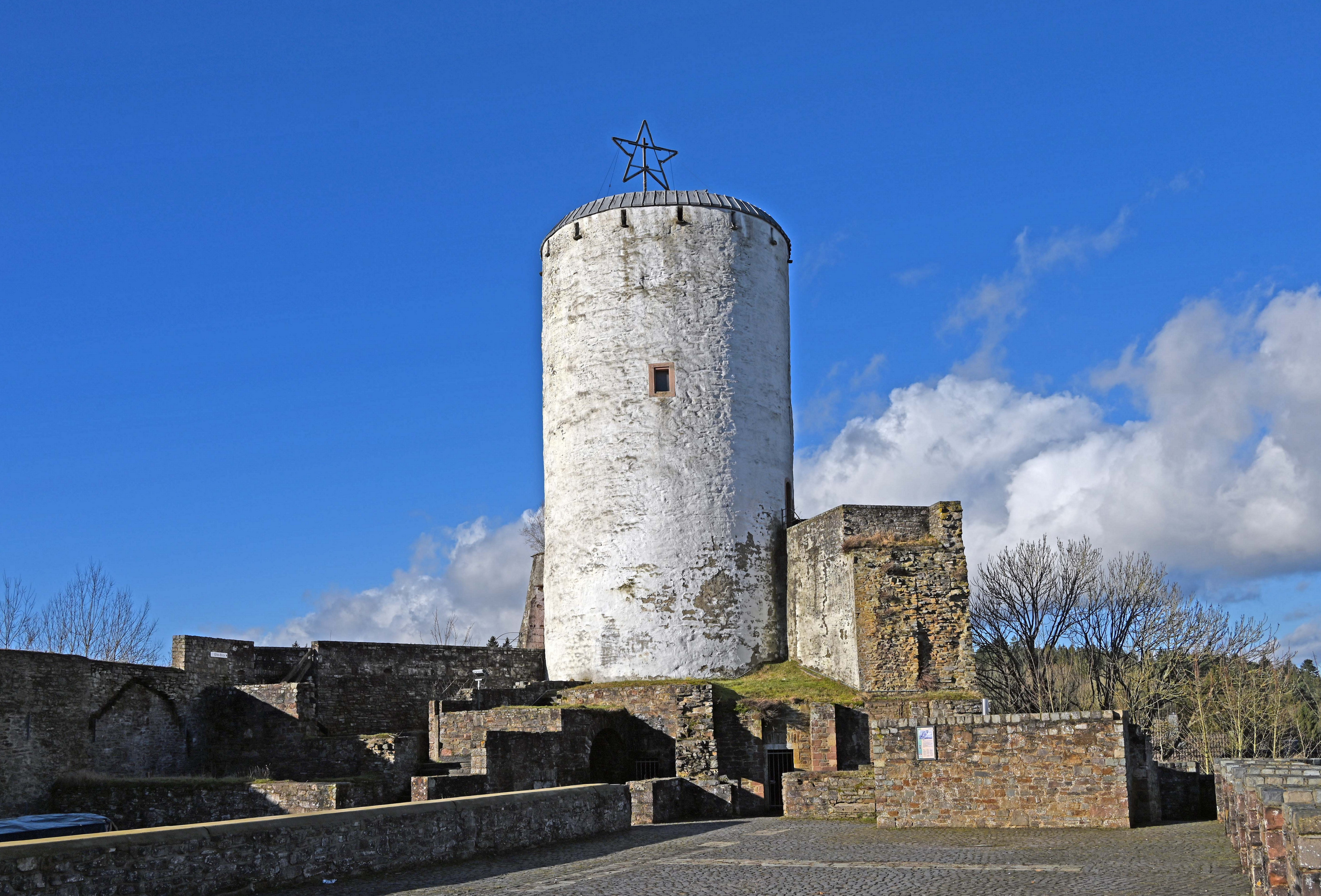
View over the ruins to the preserved bergfried

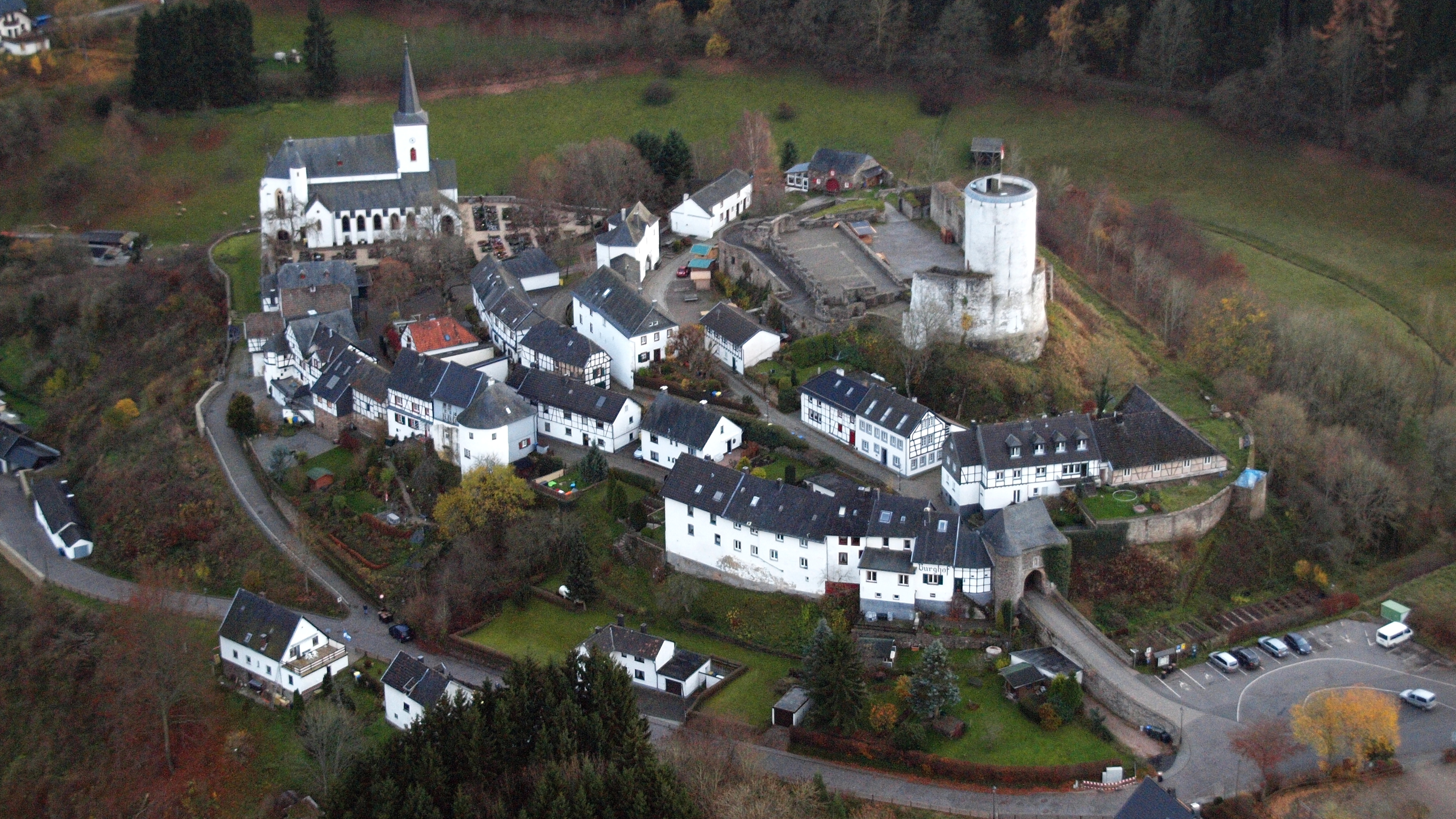
Reifferscheid Castle, 2015 aerial photograph

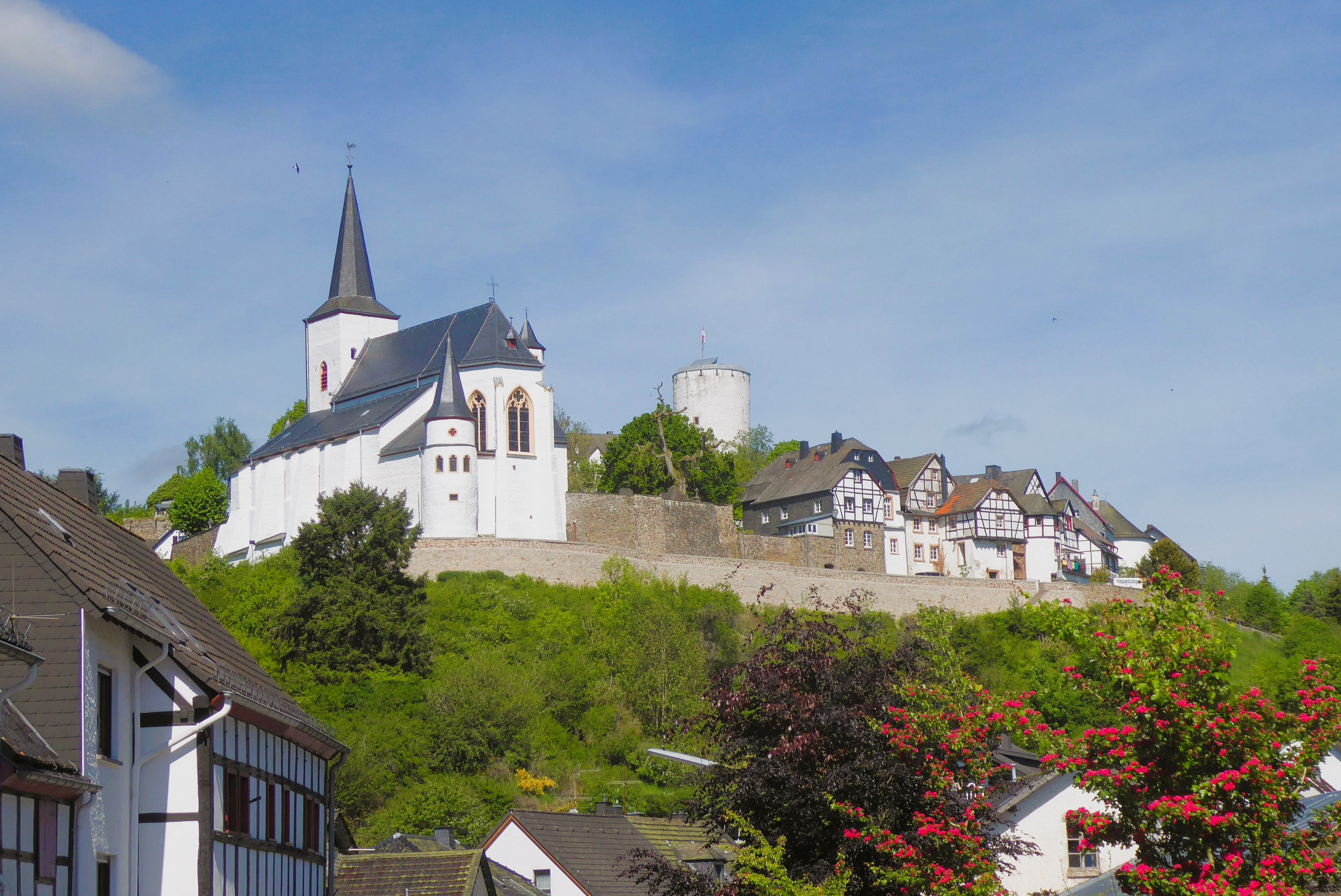
The castle seen from the village

The ruins of Reifferscheid Castle (German: Burg Reifferscheid) stand at a height of 450 metres above sea level (NN) near the German-Belgian border between the mountains of the Eifel and the Ardennes in the municipality of Hellenthal. Its name probably comes from a forest clearing that belonged to a man called Rifhari, the names Rifersceith or Rifheres-sceit mean "woodland strip of Rifhari".

All that has survived of the medieval hill castle are the remains of the curtain walls, a gatehouse with two flanking round towers, a gabled entrance and a round, white-plastered bergfried made of rubble stone.

== History ==
Reifferscheid is first recorded in 1106 in the Chronica regia coloniensis under the name Riferschit. The content of the contemporary report relates to the destruction of the castle by its owner, Duke Henry of Limburg and Lower Lorraine. He razed his castle in order to prevent in falling into enemy hands.

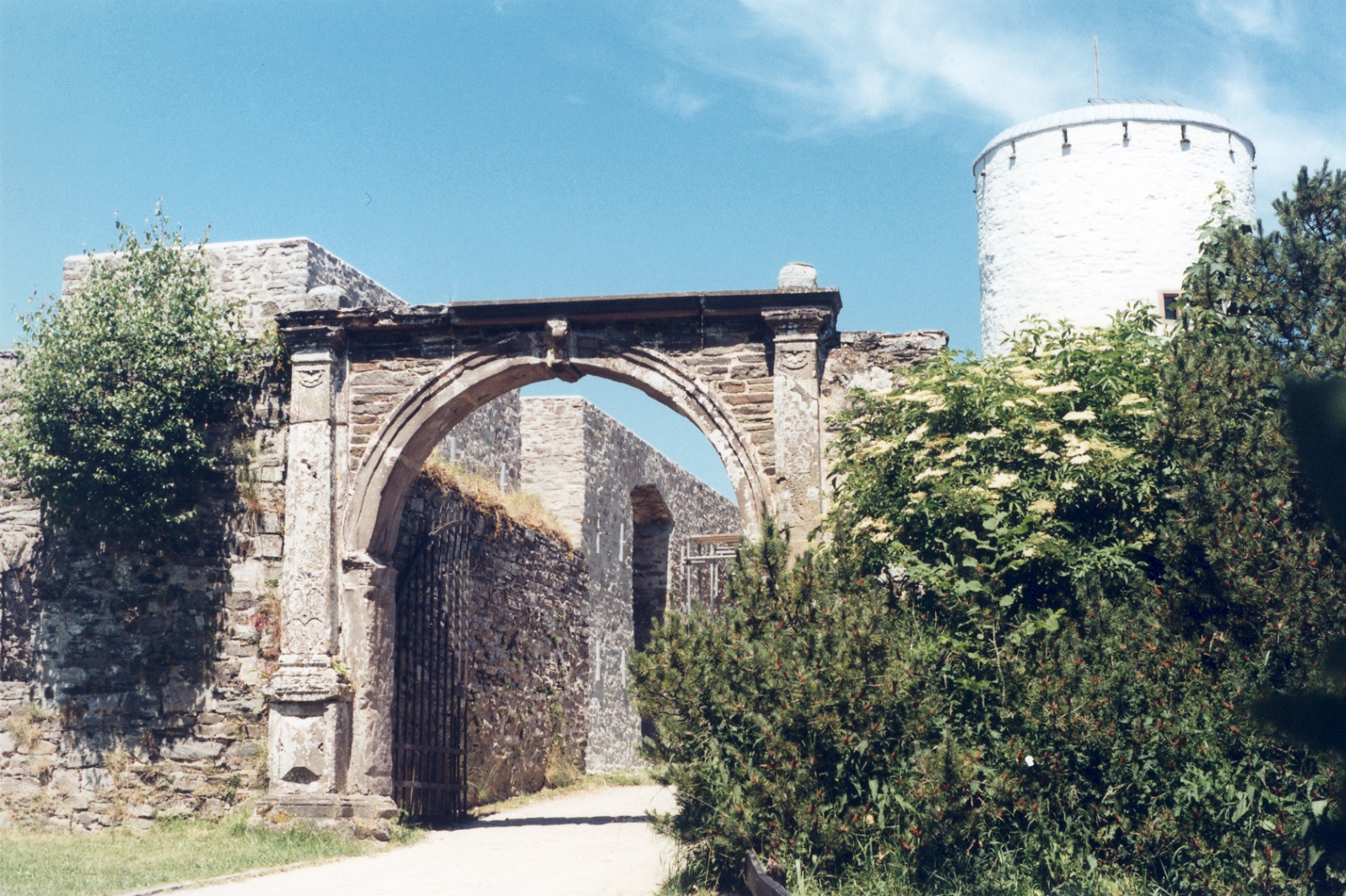
Entranceway to the ruins (1999)

In 1130 a chapel near the castle was granted the status of a parish church by Archbishop Frederick I of Cologne. The new church was overseen by Steinfeld Abbey and, in 1195, the Lords of Reifferscheid are mentioned for the first time. Several years later, the brothers Gerhard and Philip of Reifferscheid divided their lordship, and a new branch of the family appeared: the lords of Wildenburg.

In 1385, shortly after John V of Reifferscheid had taken over the lordship, the castle was captured by troops of the Meuse-Rhine Alliance, the cities of Cologne and Aachen, the archbishops of Cologne and the Liège as well as the Duke of Jülich, because John had broken the Landfrieden by undertaking numerous raids in the local area and further afield. The siege was unsuccessful, however, and the alliance troops withdrew after three months of unfinished business.

In 1416, the Lords of Reifferscheid inherited from the Lower Salm line of the counts of Salm and henceforth called themselves von Salm-Reifferscheid.

After a fire in 1509, the damaged castle was rebuilt. Another fire on 23 June 1669 destroyed the town of Reifferscheid and its castle completely. On the remains of the old building substance, its owner had a representative schloss built in the Baroque style, and on the foundations of the old castle walls the houses of the former Burgfreiheit were rebuilt.

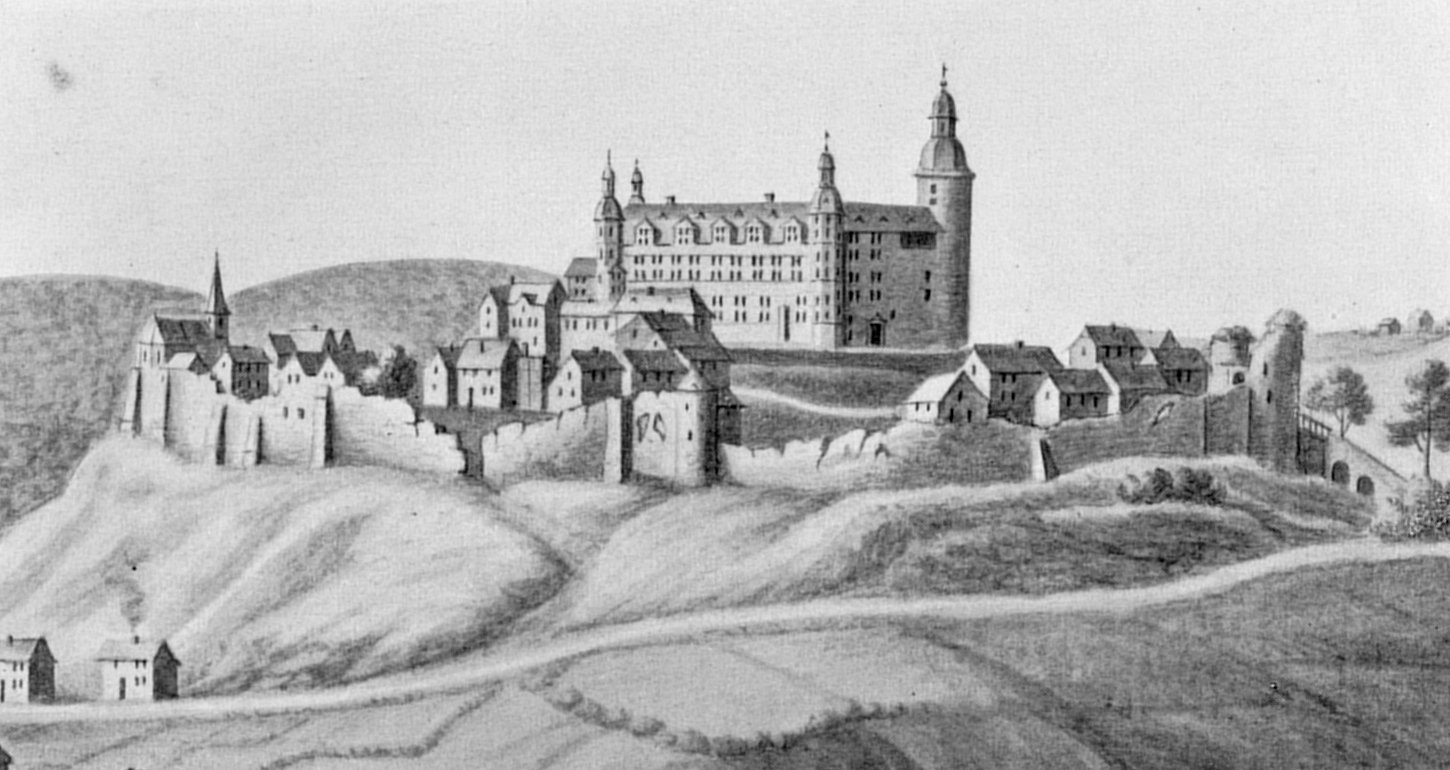
The castle c. 1725. Ink drawing by Mathieu Throuüet

But the new splendour did not last long. During the War of the Palatine Succession, troops of Louis XIV slighted the house in 1689. The reconstruction of the castle at that time must have been completed very quickly, however, because a drawing in ink by Mathieu Throuüet shows that the castle was fully restored around 1725.

Troops of the French Revolutionary Army occupied and destroyed the castle in 1794 and, in 1803, it was seized from the lords of Reifferscheid, the Barony of Reifferscheid was dissolved and the ruin was auctioned off for demolition in 1805 to raise money for the French government and went into private hands. In the following decades it served as a quarry and supplied construction material for new buildings in the surrounding area, before it was returned to the possession of the Salm-Reifferscheid family, who had meanwhile been elevated to the status of princes in 1889.

Since 1965, the ruin has been owned by the municipality of Hellenthal. The villagers of Reifferscheid have devoted themselves to its preservation over the last few decades, and the place has received several awards.

== Literature ==
- Alfred Esser: Reifferscheid. Eine kurze Geschichte des Ortes, seiner Burg und seiner Kirche. Ingmanns, Schleiden, 1979.
- Anton Fahne: Geschichte der Grafen jetzigen Fürsten zu Salm-Reifferscheid. J. M. Heberle, Cologne, 1866, First Volume and Cologne, 1858, Second Volume.
- Walter Pippke und Ida Pallhuber: The Eifel. Entdeckungsreisen durch Landschaft, Geschichte, Kultur und Kunst, von Aachen bis zur Mosel. 2. Aufl. DuMont, Cologne, 1984. p. 47, ISBN 3-7701-1413-2.
- Olaf Wagener: ... wart belacht van dem lantfreden dat slos van Rifferscheit ... The Landfriedensexekution gegen Reifferscheid 1385. In: Burgen und Schlösser. Jg. 47, No. 1, 2006, pp. 23–31, ISSN 0007-6201.
