= Olef Dam =

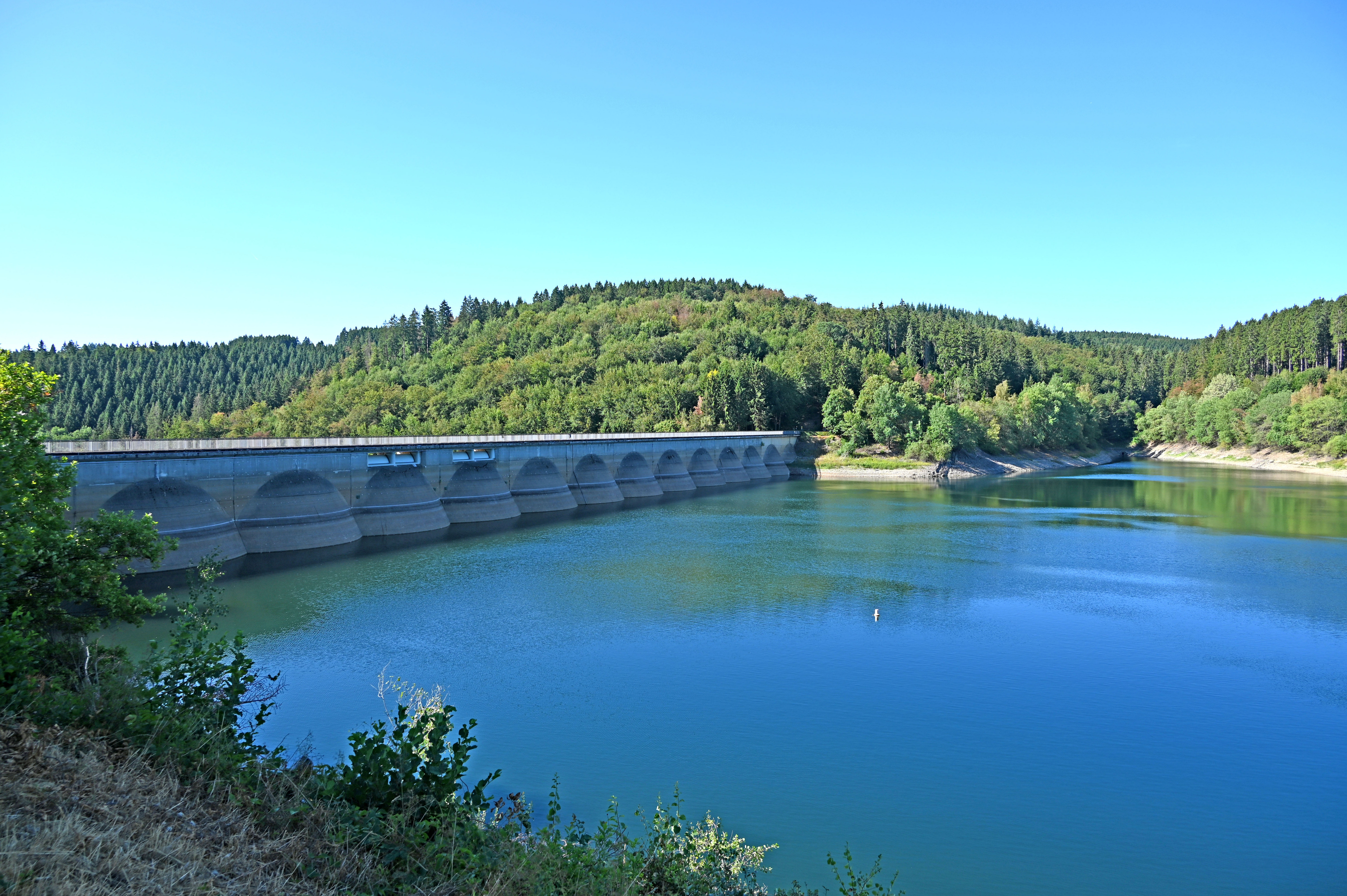
- View from the north. Left rear: the dam
- Interactive map of Olef Dam
- Location: Euskirchen
- Coordinates: 50.4950°N 6.4215°E
- Construction began: 1954–1959

Dam and spillways
- Impounds: Olef
- Height (foundation): 59 m
- Height (thalweg): 54.6 m
- Length: 282 m (925 ft)
- Elevation at crest: 466.9 m
- Width (crest): 5.7 m
- Dam volume: 123,000 m^{3}

Reservoir
- Total capacity: 20,3 Mm^{3}
- Active capacity: 19.3 Mm^{3}
- Catchment area: 47.92 km^{2}
- Surface area: 1.1 km^{2}
- Normal elevation: 465.5 m

The Olef Dam (German: Oleftalsperre) is located in the vicinity of the Eifel National Park near Hellenthal within the High Fens-Eifel Nature Park in the county of Euskirchen in the German state of North Rhine-Westphalia. Its reservoir stores around 20 million cubic metres and is fed by the River Olef.

== Description ==
The Olef Dam was built between 1954 and 1959 for two purposes: to protect the surrounding municipalities from floods; and to supply drinking water. In 1965 the valley was completely filled with water for the first time and the dam officially opened. There were two subsequent construction phases to reinforce it: 1962–1965 and 1982–1986. The dam is made of concrete and is of the buttress type and is unique in Germany.

Other uses of the dam are to raise low water levels, industrial water processing and hydropower generation. The power station capacity is 3 MW, its annual energy production is 2.6 GWh. The storage power station is operated by RWE Innogy.

The dam belongs to the Wasserverband Eifel-Rur. Because of its proximity to the Belgian border, its western half is within the safety template of the Elsenborn Training Area in the Belgian municipality of Bütgenbach.

The dam had to be reinforced twice because large variations in temperature and shrinkage of the concrete produced greater internal stresses than were foreseen, leading to cracks. The initially open downstream side was sealed in order to limit the temperature variations.

The shortest circular route around the reservoir is 13 km long. It runs along the lakeshore and is open to cyclists. Its northern side is largely tarmacked.

In early April 2007 the downstream face of the dam was decorated by artist, Klaus Dauven, with high pressure cleaners as part of Project Wildwechsel. It portrays forest and river animals from the area.

== Gallery ==
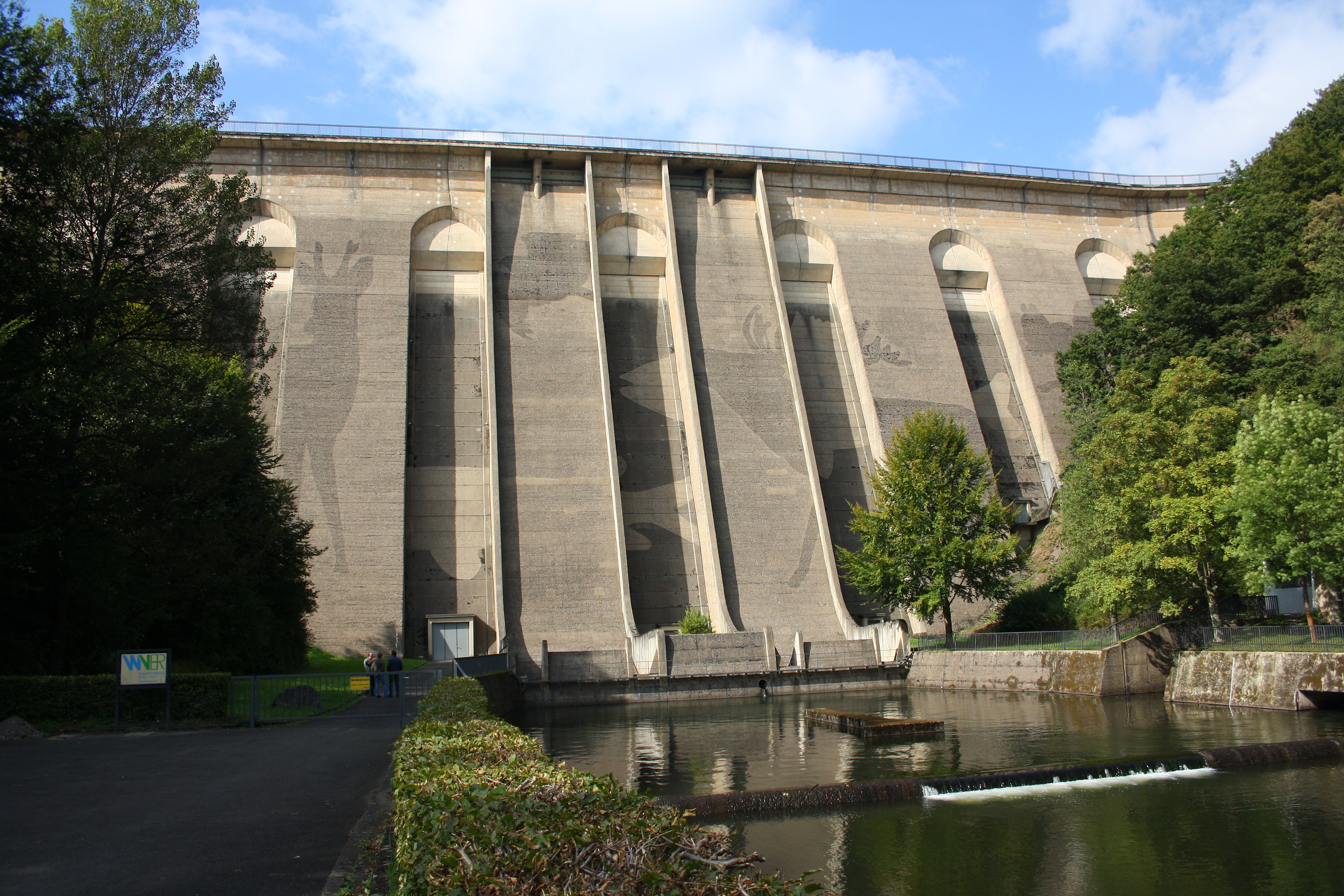
Long shot of the dam with Klaus Dauvens Wildwechsel

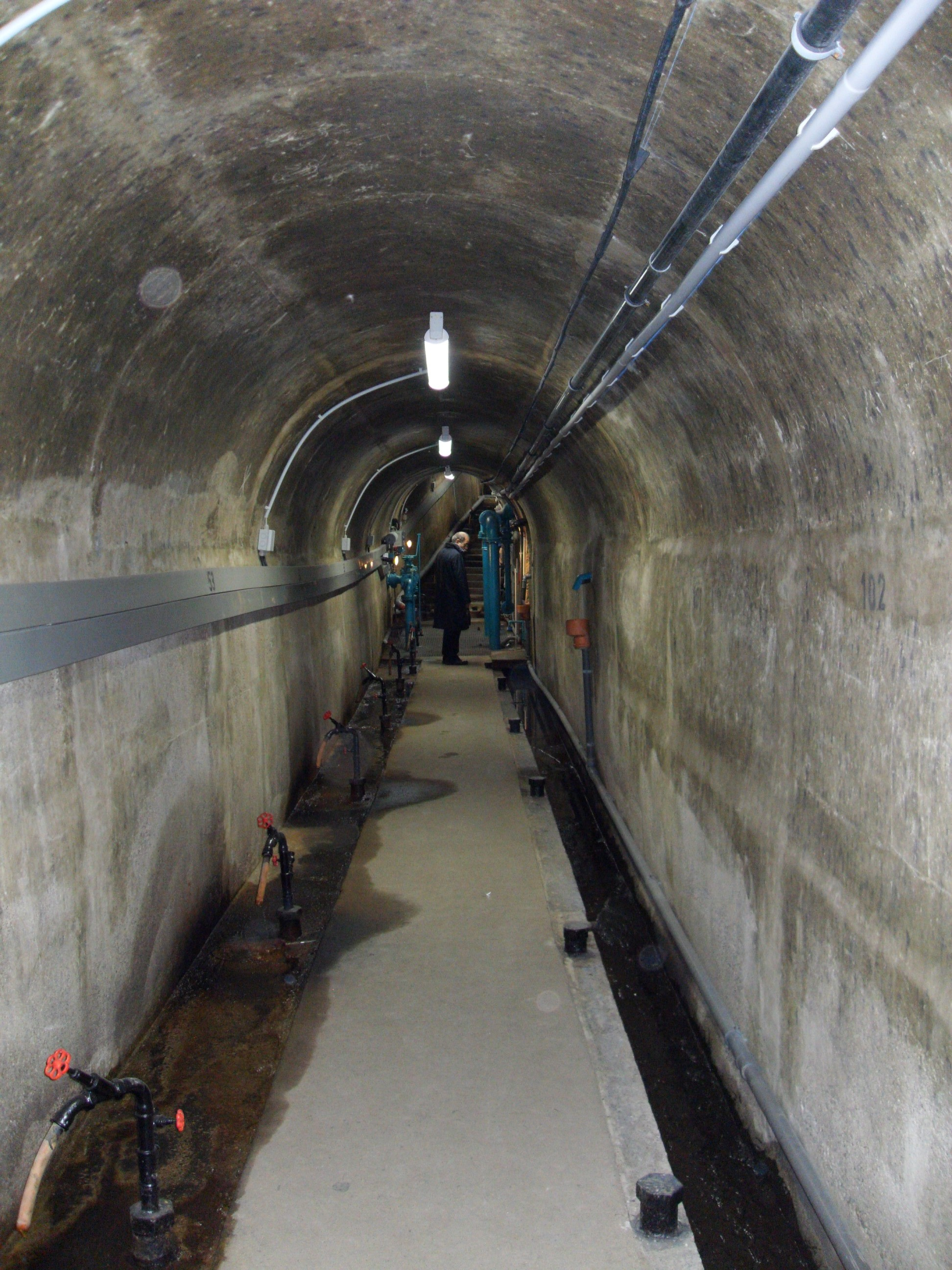
Controlled entranceway inside the dam

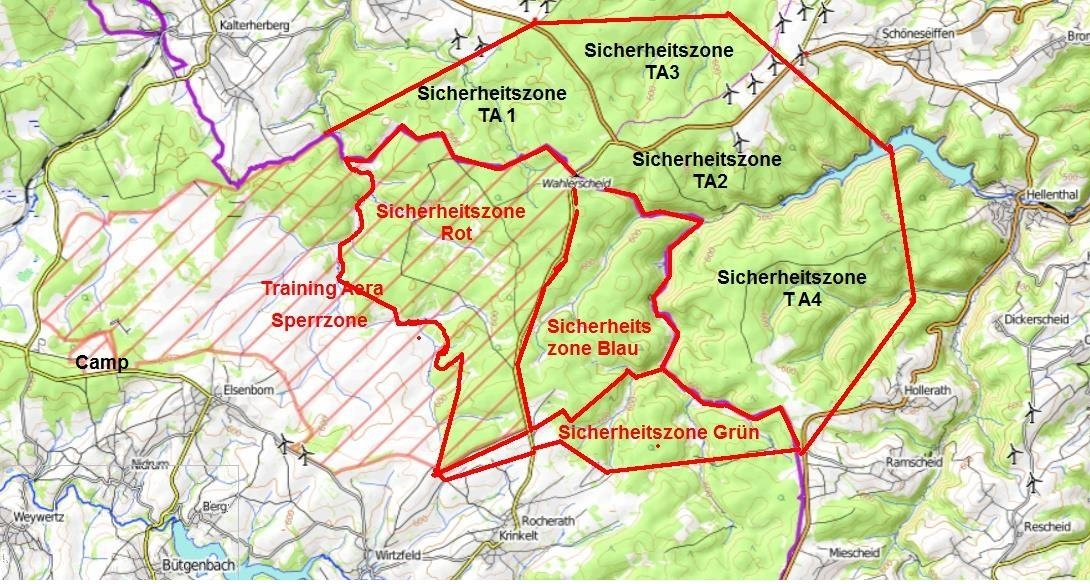
Training area safety templates by the Olef Reservoir

== See also ==
- List of dams in Germany

== Literature ==
- Felix Gerhardus: Der Bau der Oleftalsperre. In: Heimatkalender des Landkreises Schleiden. 9, 1959, ISSN 0441-6538, pp. 56–68.
