= Wildenburg Castle (Eifel) =

- Burg Wildenburg
- Hellenthal
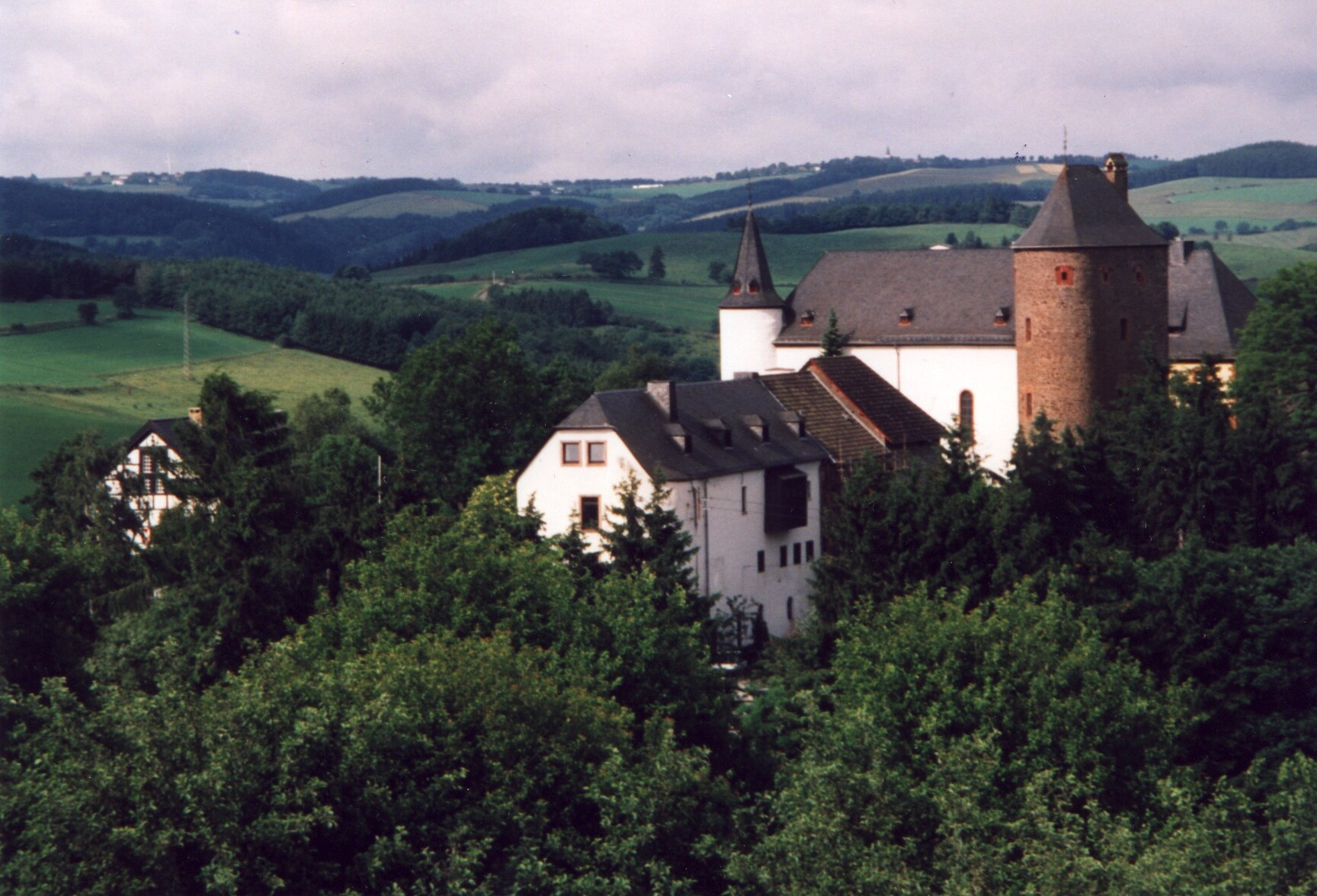
- The Wildenburg in 1997

Site information
- Type: hill castle, spur castle
- Code: DE-NW
- Condition: preserved

Location
- Coordinates: 50°27′43″N 6°29′39″E
- Height: 526 m above sea level (NHN)

Site history
- Built: 1202 to 1235

Garrison information
- Occupants: nobles, counts, clerics

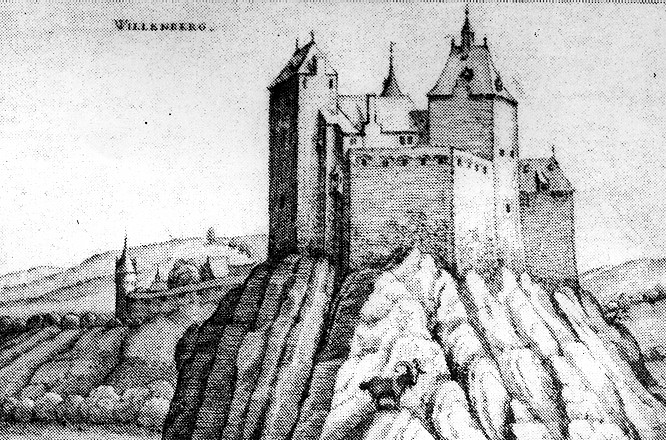
The Wildenburg around 1618

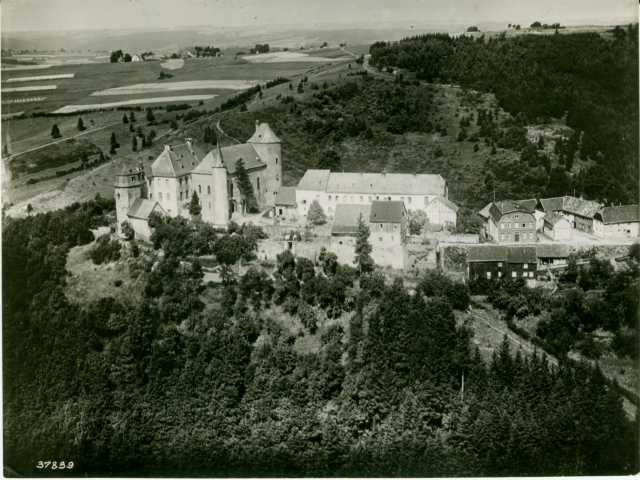
A Hansa Luftbild aerial photograph of the Wildenburg from 1932

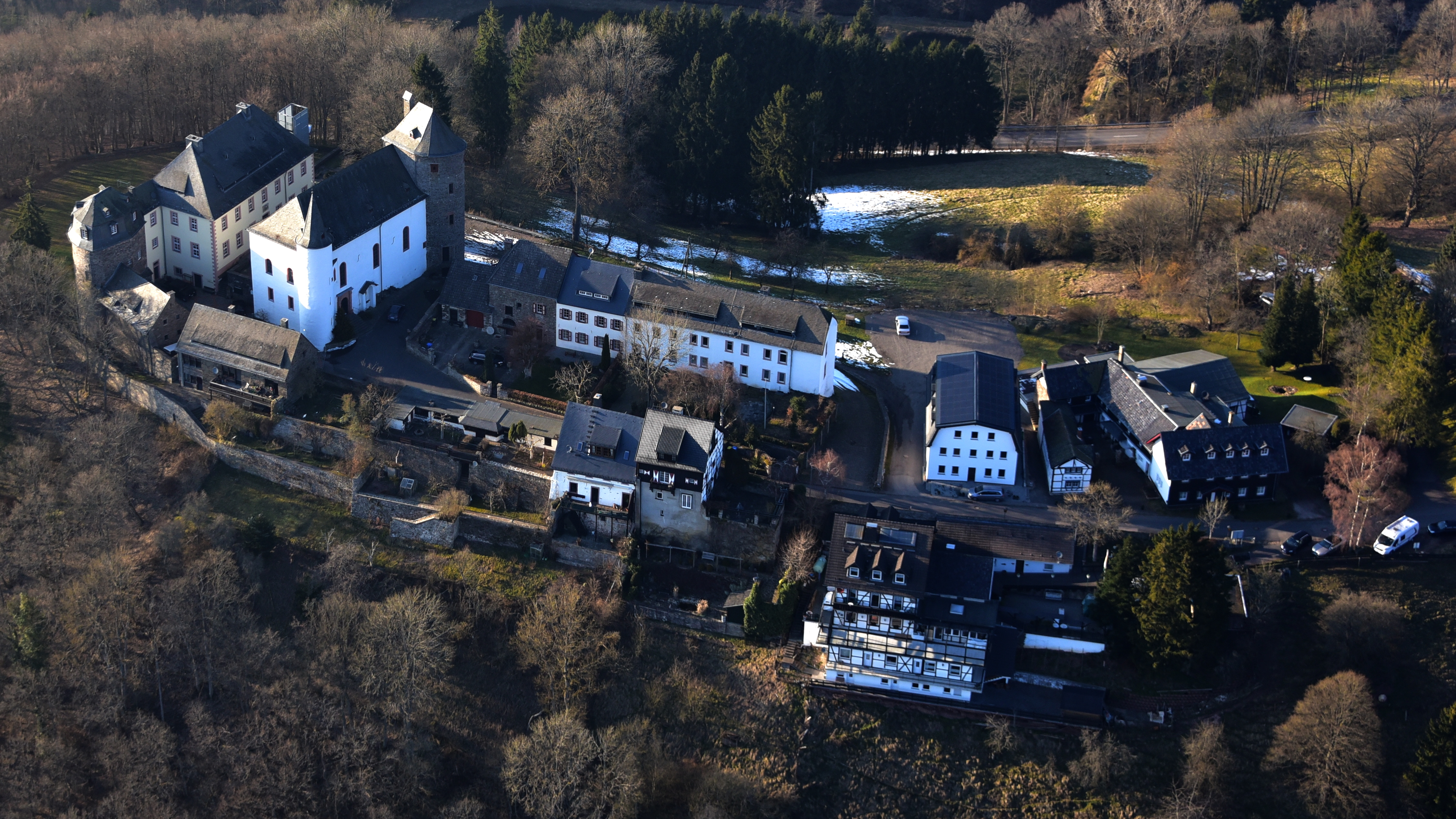
Wildenburg, 2016 aerial photograph

The Wildenburg lies in the North Rhine-Westphalian part of the Eifel Mountains in the national park district of Hellenthal in the German county of Euskirchen.

== History ==
The castle was built between 1202 and 1235 and is one of the few hill castles in the Eifel that has not been destroyed by war or demolition. It was the centre of gravity of a territorial lordship that extended in the west as far as the present border with Belgium and in the east reached the gates of Steinfeld Abbey. As in the Middle Ages the castle may only be accessed on a single road, today the Landesstraße 22, which runs from the valley of the Reifferscheider Bach via Steinfeld into the valley of the River Urft.

== Literature ==
- Roland Günter (1989), Kunstreiseführer Rheinland (in German), Bintlach: Gondrom Verlag, ISBN 3-8112-0592-7
- Harald Herzog: Burgen und Schlösser. Rheinland-Verlag, Cologne, 1989, ISBN 3-7927-1067-6.
- Manfred Konrads: Die Geschichte der Herrschaft Wildenburg in der Eifel. Handprese Weilerswist, Euskirchen, 2001, ISBN 3-935221-08-8.
- Ernst Wackenroder (rev.): Die Kunstdenkmäler des Kreises Schleiden. Verlag Schwann, Düsseldorf, 1932. (Nachdruck: Verlag Schwann-Bagel, Düsseldorf 1982, ISBN 3-590-32116-4)
- Werner Paravicini (ed.): Höfe und Residenzen im spätmittelalterlichen Reich. Grafen und Herren, Teilband 2, Ostfildern, 2012, ISBN 978-3-7995-4525-9
