= Rinnebach (Rur) =

River in Germany

Location
- Country: Germany
- State: North Rhine-Westphalia

Physical characteristics
- Source
  - location: near Kleinhau, a district of Hürtgenwald
  - coordinates: 50.7255°N 6.3991°E
- Mouth
  - location: Obermaubach, a district of Kreuzau
  - coordinates: 50.7165°N 6.4478°E

Rinnebach is a river of North Rhine-Westphalia, Germany. It is a left tributary of the Rur.

== See also ==
- List of rivers of North Rhine-Westphalia
