= Ellebach =

River in Germany

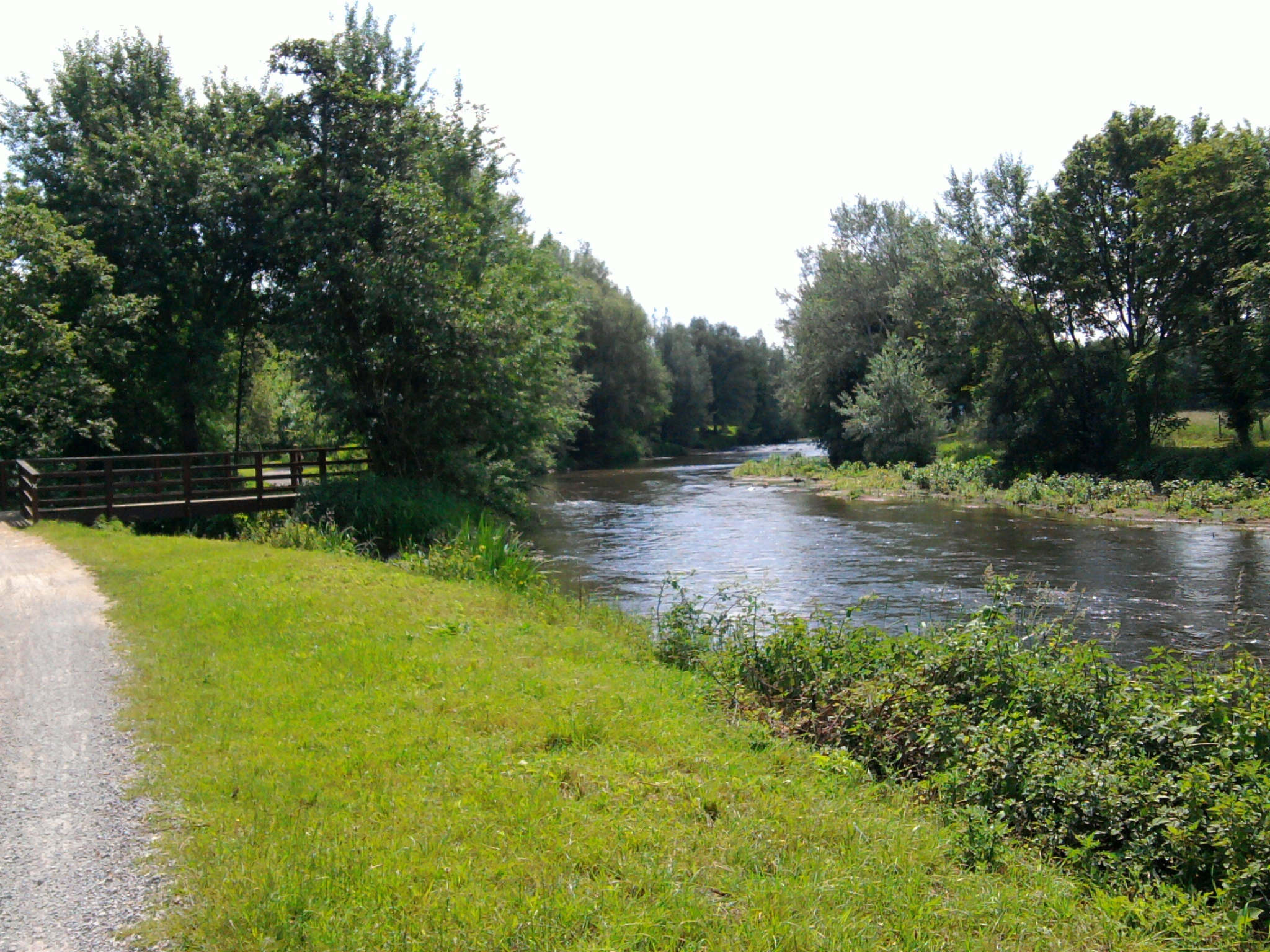

Location
- Country: Germany
- State: North Rhine-Westphalia

Physical characteristics
- Mouth
  - location: Rur
  - coordinates: 50.9387°N 6.3455°E
- Length: 33.6 km (20.9 mi)
- Basin size: 113 km^{2} (44 sq mi)

Basin features
- Progression: Rur→ Meuse→ North Sea

Ellebach is a river of North Rhine-Westphalia, Germany. The Ellebach rises in the Drover Heath, within the municipality of Kreuzau. The territories of Nörvenich, Merzenich, Düren, and Niederzier are reached. It flows into the Rur near Jülich.

== See also ==
- List of rivers of North Rhine-Westphalia
