= Malefinkbach =

River in Germany

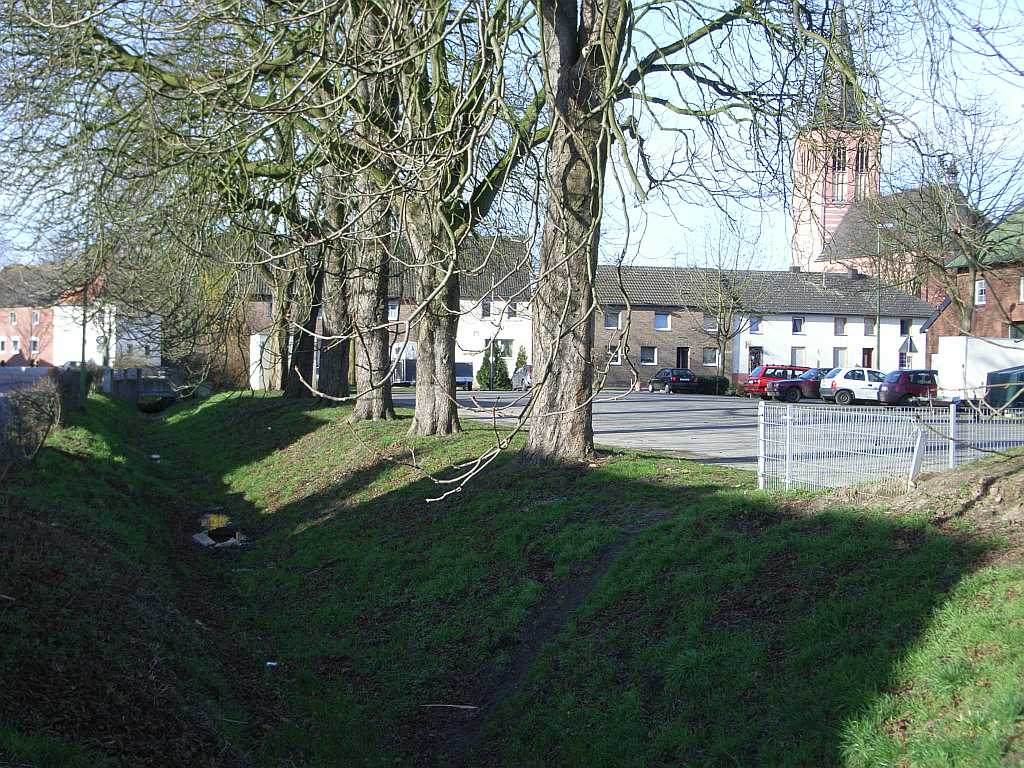

Location
- Country: Germany
- State: North Rhine-Westphalia

Physical characteristics
- Mouth
  - location: Rur
  - coordinates: 51.0245°N 6.2498°E
- Length: 21.8 km (13.5 mi)

Basin features
- Progression: Rur→ Meuse→ North Sea

Malefinkbach is a river of North Rhine-Westphalia, Germany. It flows into the Rur near Hückelhoven.

== See also ==
- List of rivers of North Rhine-Westphalia
