= Rurtalbahn =

Rurtalbahn GmbH
- Type: GmbH
- Founded: 1993
- Key people: Wolfgang Spelthahn
- Services: Rail services
- Owner: R.A.T.H. GmbH (74,9%); Beteiligungsgesellschaft Kreis Düren mbH (25,1%)
- Number of employees: 97
- Website: www.rurtalbahn.de

Rurtalbahn (German for "Rur Valley Railway") is a railway company servicing the Rur valley from Linnich to Heimbach. Its major hub is Düren station, from where two train lines run to the two destinations.

Rurtalbahn GmbH is owned by R.A.T.H GmbH (74.9%) and Dürener Kreisbahn (25.1%). It was outsourced from Dürener Kreisbahn in 2003, who had formerly promoted their railway network as Rurtalbahn. Dürener Kreisbahn had operated the two train lines since 1993 (however with the line to Linnich being shorter - trains only went to Jülich).

On weekends, Rurtalbahn runs several tourist trains in the Eifel area such as the BördeExpress. Rurtalbahn has a stake of 50% in the recently founded VIAS GmbH, a railway company servicing the Frankfurt area. In the Düren area, Rurtalbahn runs its trainlines on behalf of Aachener Verkehrsverbund (AVV), the Bördeexpress is run on behalf of IG Rurtalbahn.

Rurtalbahn is also expanding its freight branch.
