= Kall (Rur) =

River in Germany

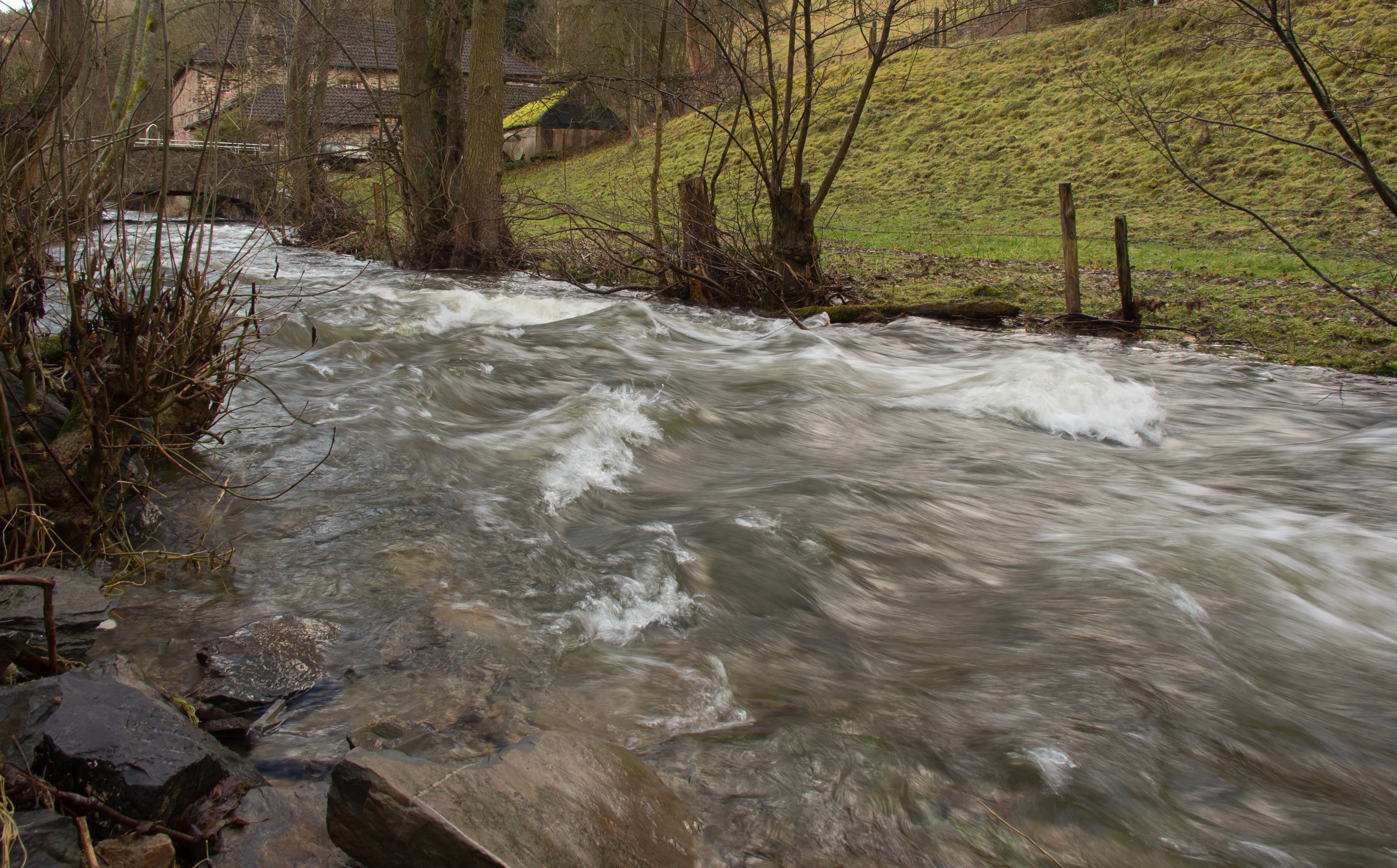
- The Kall at Simonskall, Hürtgenwald

Location
- Country: Germany
- States: North Rhine-Westphalia

Physical characteristics
- Mouth
  - location: Rur
  - coordinates: 50.6916°N 6.4526°E

Basin features
- Progression: Rur→ Meuse→ North Sea

Kall (German pronunciation: [kal]) is a river of North Rhine-Westphalia, Germany. It is 25.9 km long and flows into the Rur as a left tributary in Zerkall.

The source of the Kall lies within the territory of the city of Eupen, near the hamlet of Fringshaus. It reaches Germany at the north end of Monschau-Konzen and flows past the northern end of the main town of Simmerath. North of Simmerath-Rollesbroich it forms a reservoir at the Kalltal Dam. The lower course lies within the territory of Hürtgenwald. For example, the resort-town Simonskall, the Mestrenger Mühle (Mestrenger Mill) and the Nationalpark Information Desk Zerkall lie in the area of the lower Kall.

== See also ==
- List of rivers of North Rhine-Westphalia
