= Linnich =

- Town
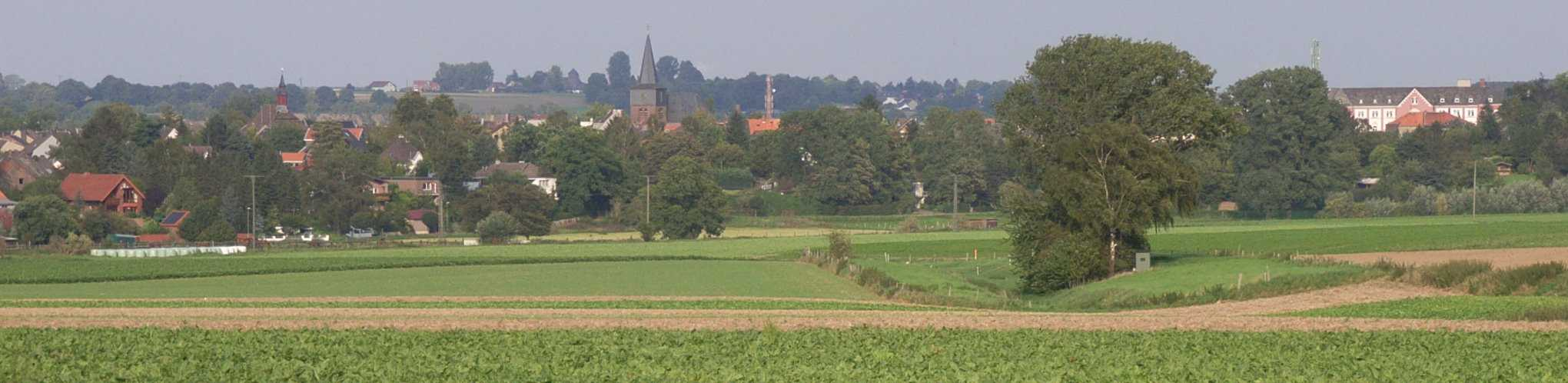

- Flag Coat of arms

- Location of Linnich within Düren district
- Interactive map of Linnich
- Location within Germany Location within North Rhine-Westphalia
- Coordinates: 50°58′44″N 06°16′04″E
- Country: Germany
- State: North Rhine-Westphalia
- Admin. region: Köln
- District: Düren
- Subdivisions: 13

Government
  - Mayor (2020–25): Marion Christine Schunck-Zenker (SPD)

Area
  - Total: 65.43 km^{2} (25.26 sq mi)
- Elevation: 73 m (240 ft)

Population (2025-12-31)
  - Total: 13,690
  - Density: 209.2/km^{2} (541.9/sq mi)
- Time zone: UTC+01:00 (CET)
  - Summer (DST): UTC+02:00 (CEST)
- Postal codes: 52441
- Dialling codes: 02462
- Vehicle registration: DN and JÜL
- Website: www.linnich.de

Linnich (German pronunciation: [ˈlɪnɪç]) is a town in the district of Düren in the state of North Rhine-Westphalia, Germany. It is located on the Roer (German: Rur).

== Population ==
Historical population

Year	Pop.	±% p.a.
1965	12,260	—
1970	12,847	+0.94%
1975	12,937	+0.14%
1980	13,206	+0.41%
1985	12,875	−0.51%
1990	12,559	−0.50%
1995	13,697	+1.75%

Year	Pop.	±% p.a.
2000	13,853	+0.23%
2005	13,694	−0.23%
2010	13,468	−0.33%
2015	12,591	−1.34%
2020	12,697	+0.17%
2025	13,690	+1.52%

Source: Landesdatabank Nordrhein-Westfalen

== Economy ==
There is an SIG subdivisional company in Rurstraße 58, 52441 Linnich, Germany. The head of service is Erich Kremp.

== Town twinning ==
Since 1974, Linnich is twinned with the French town of Lesquin in the Nord département.

== Transportation ==
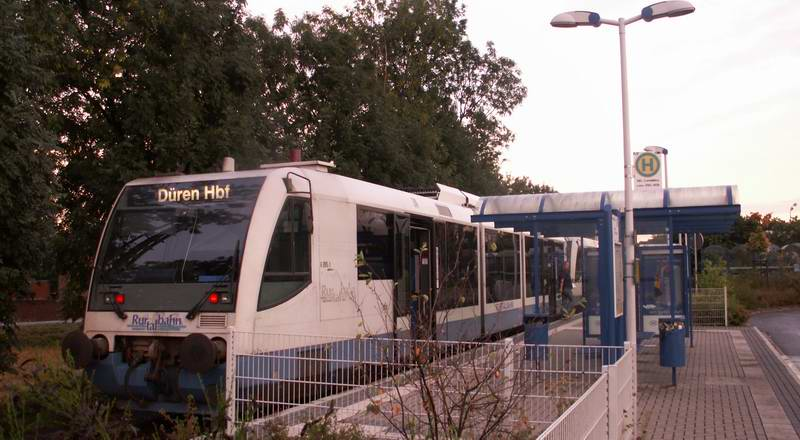
Linnich station

There is a train station and a bus central station in Linnich. The train RB21 (by Rurtalbahn) provides service from Linnich via Jülich to Düren.

== Culture and landmarks ==
=== Museums ===
- Deutsche Glasmalerei-Museum (German Stained Glass Museum)
- Heimatmuseum Linnich (Hometown museum Linnich) (now closed)

=== Churches ===
- Parish church of St. Martinus (Linnich), Kirchplatz 14, named for Martin of Tours
- Evangelische Kirche (Linnich) ('Evangelical [i.e. Reformed or Protestant] Church' of Linnich), Altermarkt 8

== Born in Linnich ==
- Wolfgang Dahmen (born 1949), mathematician
- Udo Recker (born 1967), medieval archaeologist
- Elke Winkens (born 1970), actress
