= Roer =

River in Germany and the Netherlands

Roer Rur
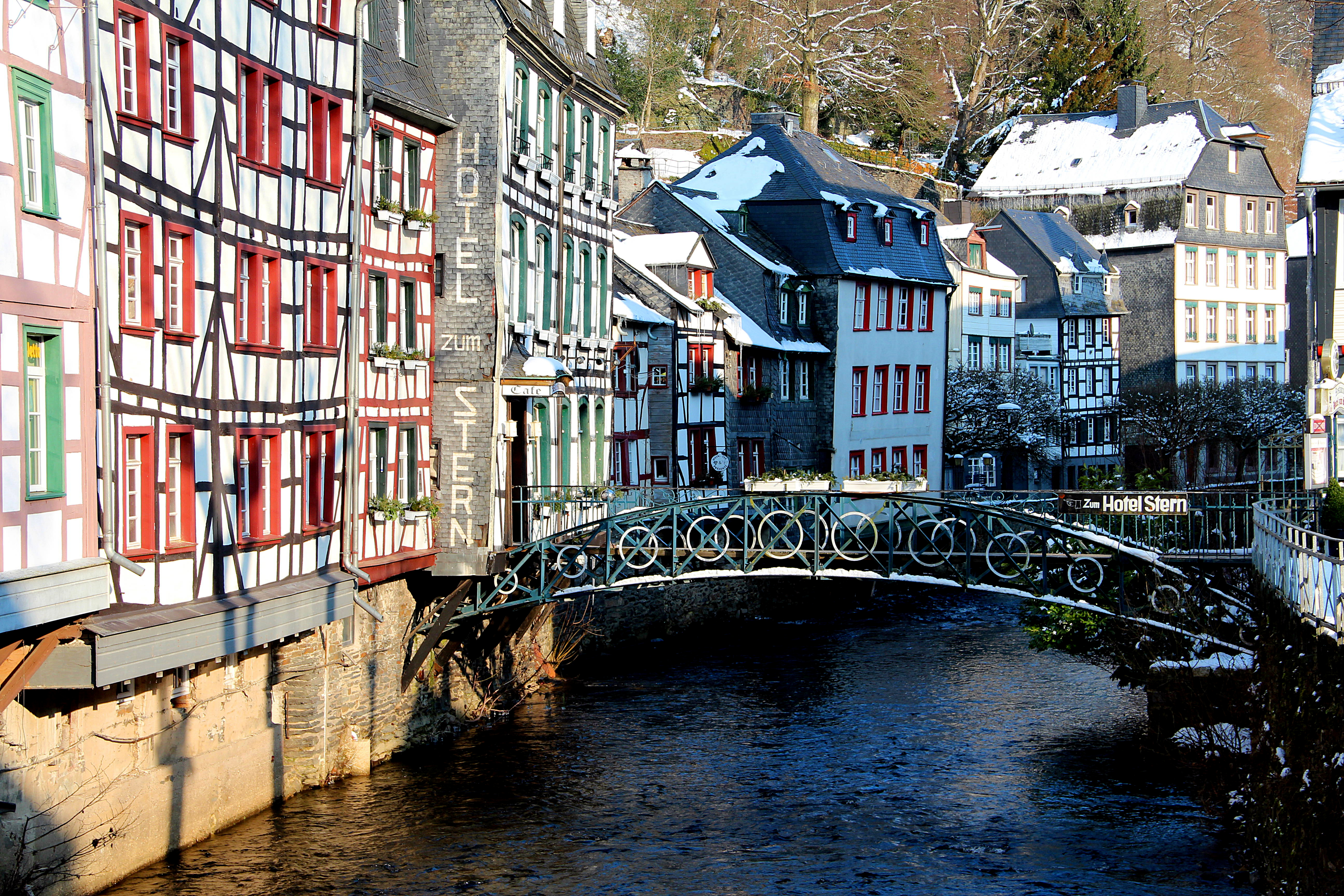
- The Roer in Monschau

Location
- Countries: Germany; Netherlands; Belgium

Physical characteristics
- Source
  - location: High Fens
  - elevation: 660 m (2,170 ft)
- Mouth
  - location: Meuse
  - coordinates: 51°11′52″N 5°58′52″E
  - elevation: 17 m (56 ft)
- Length: 164.5 km (102.2 mi)
- Basin size: 2,361 km^{2} (912 sq mi)

Basin features
- Progression: Meuse→ North Sea

The Roer (Dutch: [ruːr], Limburgish: [ʀuːʀ˦]) or Rur (German: [ʁuːɐ̯]; French: Rour [ʁuʁ]) is a major river that flows through portions of Belgium, Germany and the Netherlands. It is a right (eastern) tributary to the Meuse (Dutch: Maas). About 90 percent of the river's course is in Germany.

It is not to be confused with the rivers Ruhr and Röhr, which are tributaries of the Rhine in North Rhine-Westphalia.

== History ==
During the Middle Ages the valley of the Roer lay mostly within the Duchy of Jülich. In 1795, until 1814, during which time the area was part of the French Republic and Empire, it gave its name to the French département of the Roer.

The Roer represented an important front in the Allied push towards Germany at the end of the Second World War. A fortified area known as the Roer Triangle, formed by the towns of Roermond and Sittard, in the Netherlands, and Heinsberg in Germany, was the scene of heavy fighting at the beginning of 1945.

Operation Blackcock was the code name for the clearing of the Roer Triangle. It was conducted by the 2nd British Army between 14 and 26 January 1945. The objective was to drive the German 15th Army back across the Rivers Roer and Wurm and move the frontline further into Germany. The operation was carried out under command of the XII Corps by three divisions. The operation is relatively unknown despite the sometimes fierce battles that were fought for each and every village and hamlet within the "Roer Triangle".

Between 16 December 1944 and 23 February 1945, the U.S. Ninth Army was unable to advance across the Roer during Operation Queen, because German forces controlled dams close to the river's source in the densely forested region of the Hohes Venn. This meant Axis forces could potentially blow the dams, releasing enough water to wash out an Allied assault. At the same time, the German Ardennes Offensive meant any further westward push would leave Allied forces stretched and supply lines exposed. Eventually the counteroffensive was overwhelmed and German engineers, under pressure of aerial and artillery bombardment, released the dams. As the flood waters began to subside, Allied forces crossed the Rur in rafts in the early hours of February 23, 1945, as part of Operation Grenade.

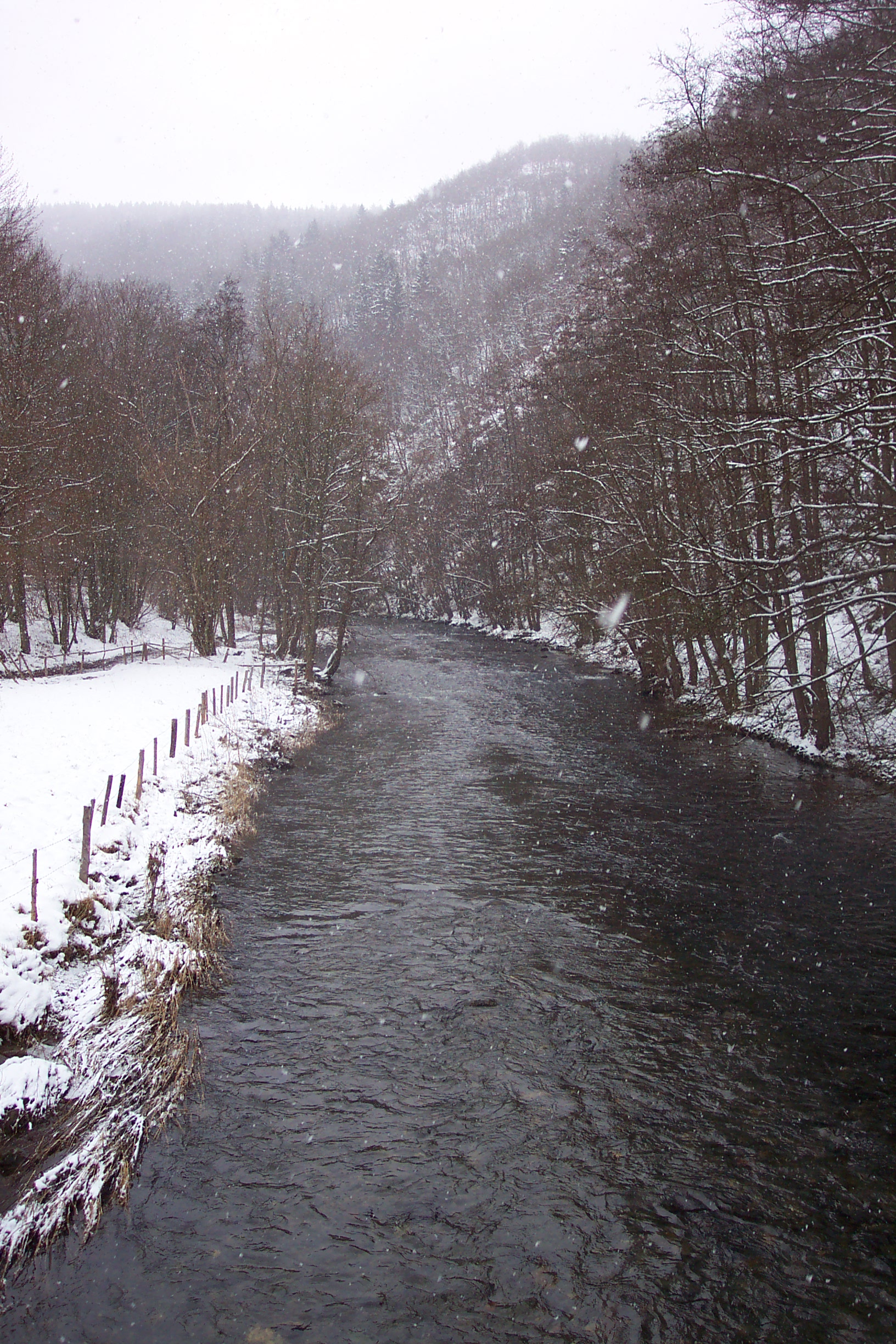
The Roer between Monschau and Dedenborn during winter

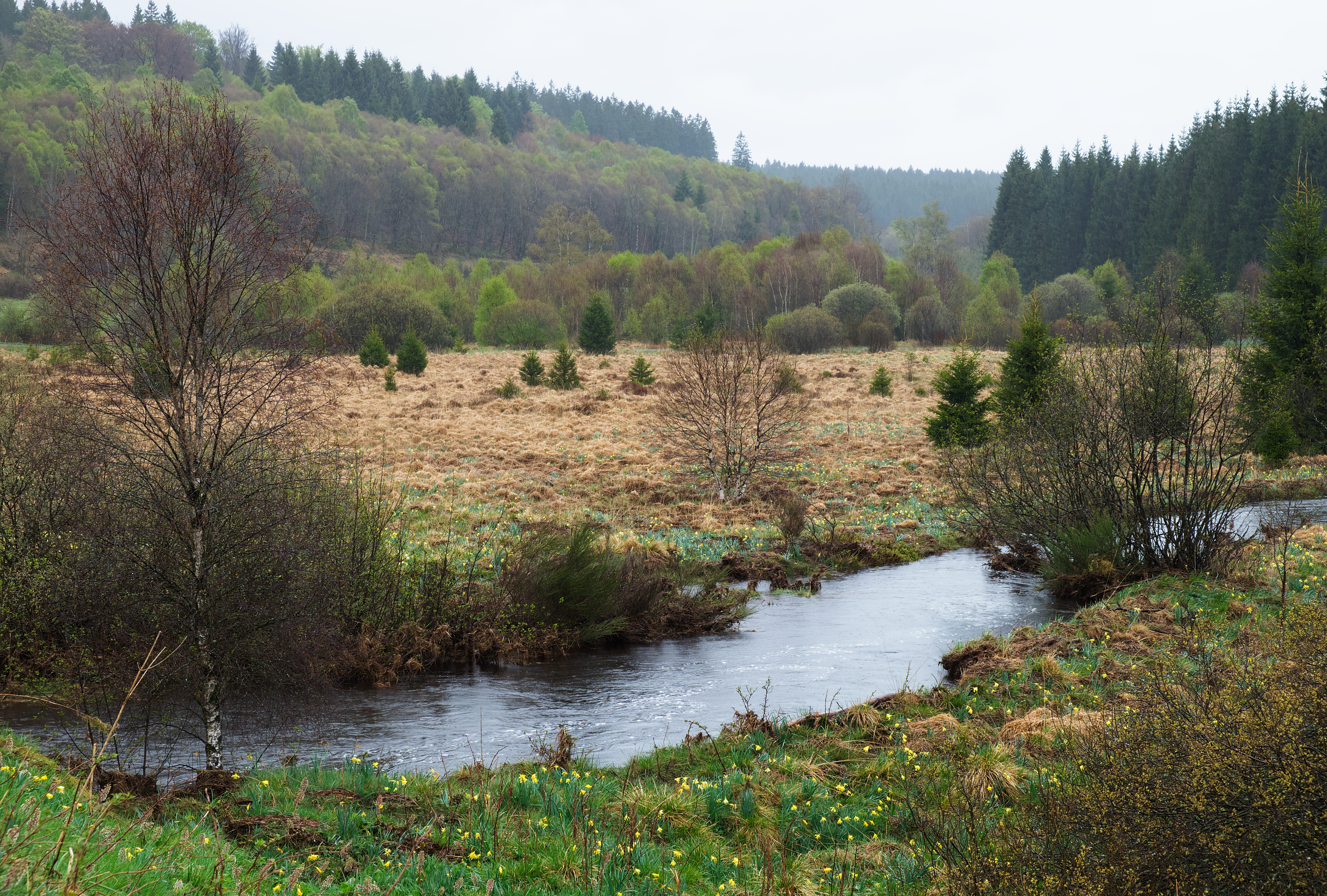
The Roer in the High Fens

== Geography ==
The Roer rises in the High Fens, near the 696-metre (2,283 ft) high Signal de Botrange in Belgium at an elevation of 660 metres (2,170 ft) above sea level. South of Monschau it flows into Germany, through North Rhine-Westphalia. It flows first through the northern part of the Eifel mountains.

After 39 kilometres (24 mi) it reaches the Roer Reservoir, the second-largest artificial lake in Germany. After approximately 160 kilometres (99 mi) it flows into the Netherlands, and at its 170-kilometre (110 mi) mark it flows into the river Meuse in the city of Roermond.

Major tributaries of the Roer include the Inde and the Wurm. The towns along the Roer are Monschau, Heimbach, Nideggen, Düren, Jülich, Linnich, Hückelhoven, Heinsberg (all in Germany) and Roermond (Netherlands).

In the 1960s and 1970s, the northern part of the Roer was heavily polluted by the tailings of many German coal mines. Neither fish nor other organisms could be found, and it was dangerous to swim in the river. Foam flakes regularly flooded parts of the city of Roermond. After the closure of the mines, the waste water treatment in Germany and the Netherlands greatly improved. Only the lower part of the river is still contaminated. The water in the upper part of the river is so clean that trout and more than 30 species of fish are back. After an absence of 125 years, salmon returned to the Roer in 2004.

=== Tributaries ===
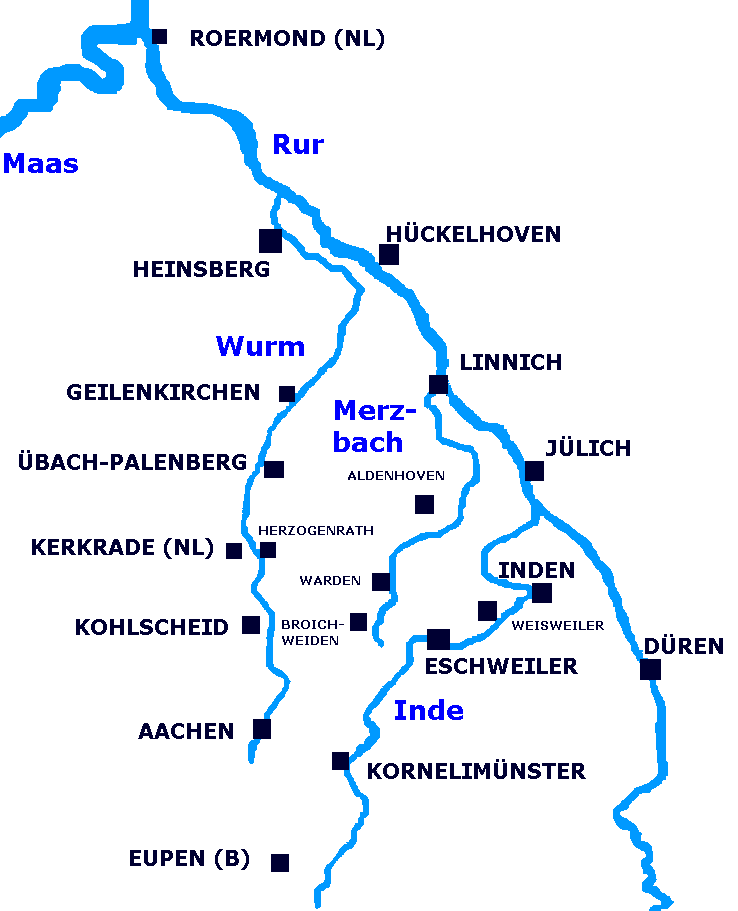
Map of river Rur/Roer and its tributaries

- Ellebach
- Inde
- Kall
- Malefinkbach
- Merzbach
- Wurm
- Olef
- Urft

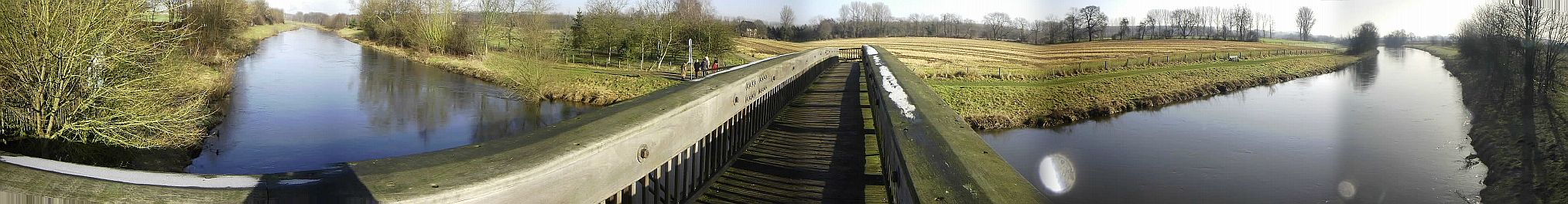
The Roer near Hückelhoven

=== The Roer dams ===
In the upper reaches of the river the waters are held back by the Roer dams to form a series of reservoirs. The largest of these is the Schwammanauel Dam (officially the Schwammenauel barrage (Absperrbauwerk Schwammenauel) enclosing the Roer reservoir (Rurstausee) itself. Above this is the Paulushof Dam, forming the Upper lake (Obersee), while the Urft Dam (Urftalsperre) impounds the Urft reservoir (Urftstausee). In 1944 the Schwammenauel Dam held back some 65,500,000 cubic metres of water, while the Urft Dam held another 4,550,000 cubic metres.

== Recreation ==
=== Water Sports ===
The Roer is the only real white water river in North Rhine-Westphalia. The upper section above the Roer reservoir (German: Rurtalsperre Schwammenauel) offers 20 kilometres (12 mi) of white water ranging from class III(+) to I. The town of Monschau is the venue for the 64th International Monschau Canoe Race 20th March 2022. The section from Heimbach to Kreuzau-Obermaubach is also suitable for canoeing. The Rursee, the Heimbach Dam, Obermaubach Dam are allowed for water sports.. The possibilities for canoeing at the German part above Kreuzau-Obermaubach are described by Mathias Dieckman in German, 2022.

== See also ==
- Rurtalbahn (Roer Valley Railway)—The tracks run approximately along the river, from Heimbach to Linnich.
