= Hellenthal =

- Municipality
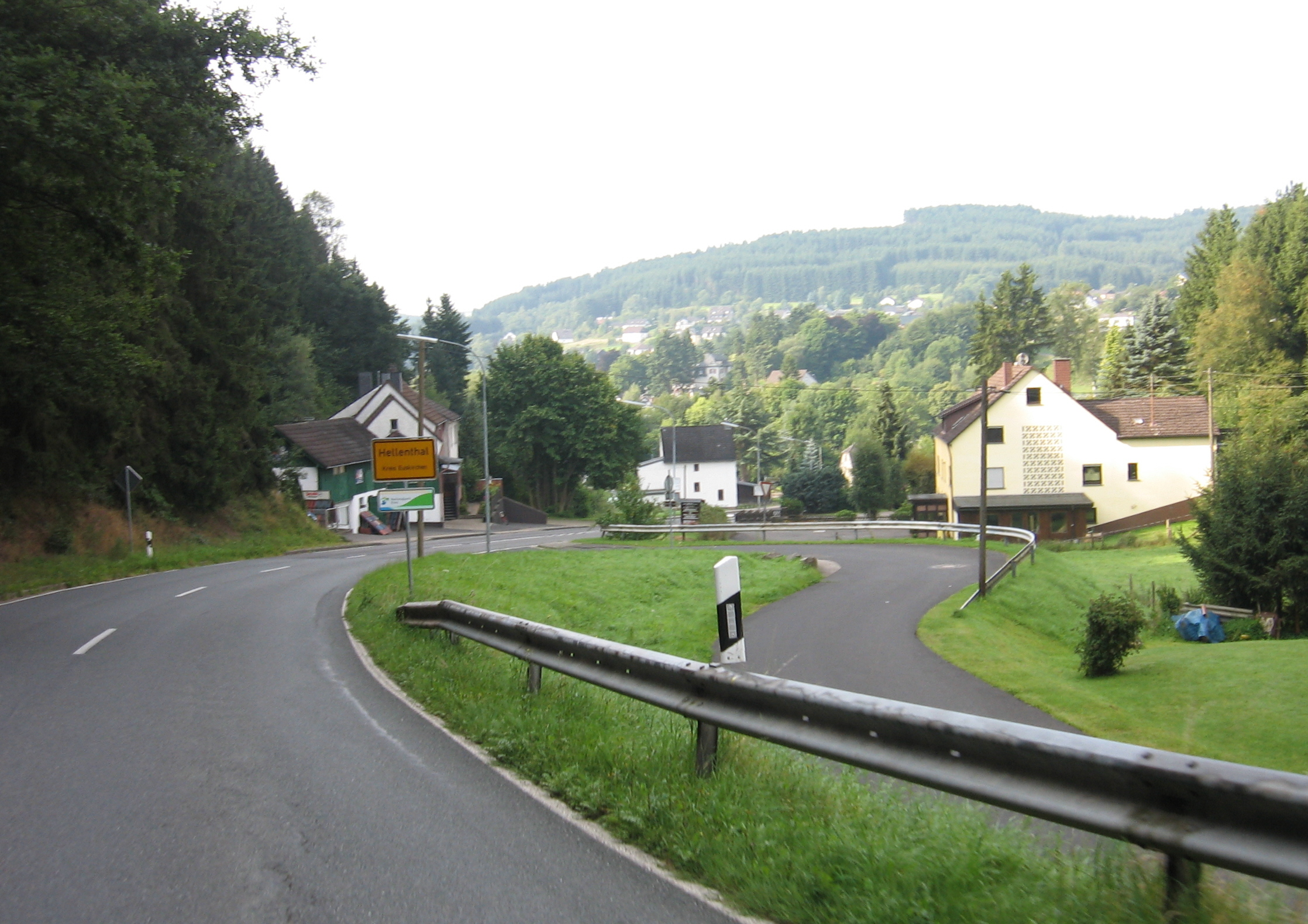

- Coat of arms

- Location of Hellenthal within Euskirchen district
- Interactive map of Hellenthal
- Location within Germany Location within North Rhine-Westphalia
- Coordinates: 50°29′N 06°26′E
- Country: Germany
- State: North Rhine-Westphalia
- Admin. region: Köln
- District: Euskirchen

Government
  - Mayor (2020–25): Rudolf Westerburg

Area
  - Total: 137.82 km^{2} (53.21 sq mi)
- Elevation: 537 m (1,762 ft)

Population (2025-12-31)
  - Total: 7,783
  - Density: 56.47/km^{2} (146.3/sq mi)
- Time zone: UTC+01:00 (CET)
  - Summer (DST): UTC+02:00 (CEST)
- Postal codes: 53940
- Dialling codes: 02482, 02448
- Vehicle registration: EU
- Website: www.hellenthal.de

Hellenthal (German pronunciation: [ˈhɛləntaːl]) is a municipality in the district of Euskirchen in the state of North Rhine-Westphalia, Germany. It is located in the Eifel hills, near the border with Belgium, approx. 30 km south-west of Euskirchen and 40 km south-east of Aachen.

The village of Reifferscheid, part of the municipality of Hellenthal, is dominated by the ruins of Reifferscheid Castle, the seat of a medieval principality, see Salm. Another village within the municipality, Blumenthal, features ironworks industry area.

== Population ==
Historical population

Year	Pop.	±% p.a.
1965	8,398	—
1970	8,692	+0.69%
1975	8,544	−0.34%
1980	8,612	+0.16%
1985	8,560	−0.12%
1990	8,317	−0.57%
1995	8,758	+1.04%

Year	Pop.	±% p.a.
2000	8,765	+0.02%
2005	8,522	−0.56%
2010	8,235	−0.68%
2015	8,094	−0.34%
2020	7,797	−0.74%
2025	7,783	−0.04%

Source: Landesdatabank Nordrhein-Westfalen
