= List of German divisions in World War II =

This article lists divisions of the Wehrmacht (German Armed Forces) and Waffen-SS active during World War II, including divisions of the Heer (army), Luftwaffe (air force), and the Kriegsmarine (navy).

Upgrades and reorganizations are shown only to identify the variant names for what is notionally a single unit; other upgrades and reorganizations are deferred to the individual articles. Due to the scope of this list, pre-war changes are not shown. Most of these divisions trained in Berlin, which is also where new military technology was kept and tested.

== German unit designations ==
These designations are normally not translated and used in the German form in the unit name or description.

Bodenständige
A static unit. Normally assigned to units who were deficient in transport and unable to move their own artillery. Many of these were divisions that had been mauled on the Eastern Front and were sent west to serve as coastal defence garrisons until sufficient resources were available to rehabilitate the division.
Festung
Translates to Fortress. A non-standard division used to garrison critical sites. Smaller Festung units may have consisted of only two or three battalions.
Grenadier
A traditional term for heavy infantry. It was most often used as a morale-building honorific indicative of reduced strength when used alone.
Jäger
A traditional term for light infantry (Translated "Hunter"). Normally provided with horse or motor transport with (usually) lighter artillery weapons and usually smaller size when compared to normal infantry divisions. In many cases the Jäger divisions were mountain divisions referred to as Gebirgsjäger. This Jäger description did not apply to the light divisions deployed in Africa (5th, 90th, 164th, 999th), nor to the five light mechanized divisions.
Gebirgsjäger
'mountain hunter'; traditional term for mountaineers and ski troops.
Lehr
'teach'; a demonstration or training unit used to train and then distribute personnel to other formations
Nummer
Translates to "Number." A "placeholder" name for a division with staff but with few, if any combat assets. Normally there was no initial type description in the name - this was added when the unit had received its designation of combat assets (i.e. Division Nr. 179 became Panzer Division Nr. 179).
Panzer
Armour (Translated "Armoured").
Panzergrenadier
Translated "Armoured"+ Grenadier
Sicherungs-Division
A Security Division Designed for garrison duties in the rear areas; may consist of two reinforced regiments or of a number of independent battalions.
Sturm
"Assault" (Translated "Storm").
Volks
"of the People" (Translated "People's").
Volksgrenadier
A late-war reorganization with reduced size and increased short-range firepower. Many previously destroyed or badly mauled infantry divisions were reconstituted as Volksgrenadier divisions, and new ones were raised as well. Their fighting worth varied widely depending on unit experience and equipment.
Volkssturm
Translated as "Peoples Militia." A national militia in which units were organized by local Nazi Party leaders and trained by the SS. They were placed under Wehrmacht command in battle.
zbV
Abbreviation for "zur besonderen Verwendung" Meaning "Special Purpose" (Translated "For Special Deployment") divisions created to meet special requirements e.g. Division zbV Afrika.

== Army (Heer) ==
=== Panzer divisions ===
==== Numbered panzer divisions ====
- 1st Panzer Division
- 2nd Panzer Division
- 3rd Panzer Division
- 4th Panzer Division
- 5th Panzer Division
- 6th Panzer Division (previously 1st Light Division)
- 7th Panzer Division (previously 2nd Light Division)
- 8th Panzer Division (previously 3rd Light Division)
- 9th Panzer Division (previously 4th Light Division)
- 10th Panzer Division
- 11th Panzer Division
- 12th Panzer Division (previously 2nd Motorized Infantry Division)
- 13th Panzer Division (previously 13th Infantry Division, 13th Motorized Infantry Division; later Panzer Division Feldherrnhalle 2)
- 14th Panzer Division (previously 4th Infantry Division)
- 15th Panzer Division (previously 33rd Infantry Division; later 15th Panzergrenadier Division)
- 16th Panzer Division (previously 16th Infantry Division)
- 17th Panzer Division (previously 27th Infantry Division)
- 18th Panzer Division (later 18th Artillery Division)
- 19th Panzer Division (previously 19th Infantry Division)
- 20th Panzer Division
- 21st Panzer Division (previously 5th Light Division)
- 22nd Panzer Division
- 23rd Panzer Division
- 24th Panzer Division (previously 1st Cavalry Division)
- 25th Panzer Division
- 26th Panzer Division (formerly 23rd Infantry Division)
- 27th Panzer Division
- 116th Panzer Division Windhund (previously 16th Infantry Division, 16th Motorized Infantry Division, and 16th Panzergrenadier Division)
- 130th Panzer Division (commonly referred to as Panzer Lehr Division)
- 155th Reserve Panzer Division (previously Division Nr. 155, Division Nr. 155 (mot.), Panzer Division Nr. 155)
- Panzer Division Nr. 178 (previously Division Nr. 178)
- 179th Reserve Panzer Division (previously Division Nr. 179, Division Nr. 179 (mot.), and Panzer Division Nr. 179)
- 232nd Panzer Division (previously Panzer Division Tatra, Panzer Training Division Tatra)
- 233rd Reserve Panzer Division (previously Division Nr. 233 (mot.), Panzergrenadier Division Nr. 233, and Panzer Division Nr. 233; later Panzer Division Clausewitz)
- 273rd Reserve Panzer Division

==== Named panzer divisions ====
- Panzer Division Clausewitz (previously Division Nr. 233 (mot.), Panzergrenadier Division Nr. 233, and Panzer Division Nr. 233, 233rd Reserve Panzer Division)
- Panzer Division Feldherrnhalle 1 (previously 60th Infantry Division, 60th Motorized Infantry Division, and Panzergrenadier Division Feldherrnhalle)
- Panzer Division Feldherrnhalle 2 (previously 13th Infantry Division, 13th Motorized Infantry Division, and 13th Panzer Division)
- Panzer Division Holstein
- Panzer Division Jüterbog
- Panzer Division Kempf (part Heer, part Waffen-SS)
- Panzer Division Kurmark
- Panzer Lehr Division (later 130th Panzer Division)
- Panzer Division Müncheberg
- Panzer Division Döberitz (later Panzer Division Schlesien)
- Panzer Division Tatra (later Panzer Training Division Tatra, 232nd Panzer Division)

==== Light mechanized divisions ====
The designation "Light" (leichte in German) had various meanings in the German Army of World War II. There were a series of 5 Light divisions; the first four were pre-war mechanized formations organized for use as mechanized cavalry, and the fifth was an ad hoc collection of mechanized elements rushed to Africa to help the Italians and organized into a division once there. All five were eventually converted to ordinary Panzer divisions.

- 1st Light Division (later 6th Panzer Division)
- 2nd Light Division (later 7th Panzer Division)
- 3rd Light Division (later 8th Panzer Division)
- 4th Light Division (later 9th Panzer Division)
- 5th Light Afrika Division (later 21st Panzer Division)

Various other divisions were dubbed "Light" for other reasons, and are listed among the Infantry Series Divisions (see below ↓).

=== Infantry series divisions ===
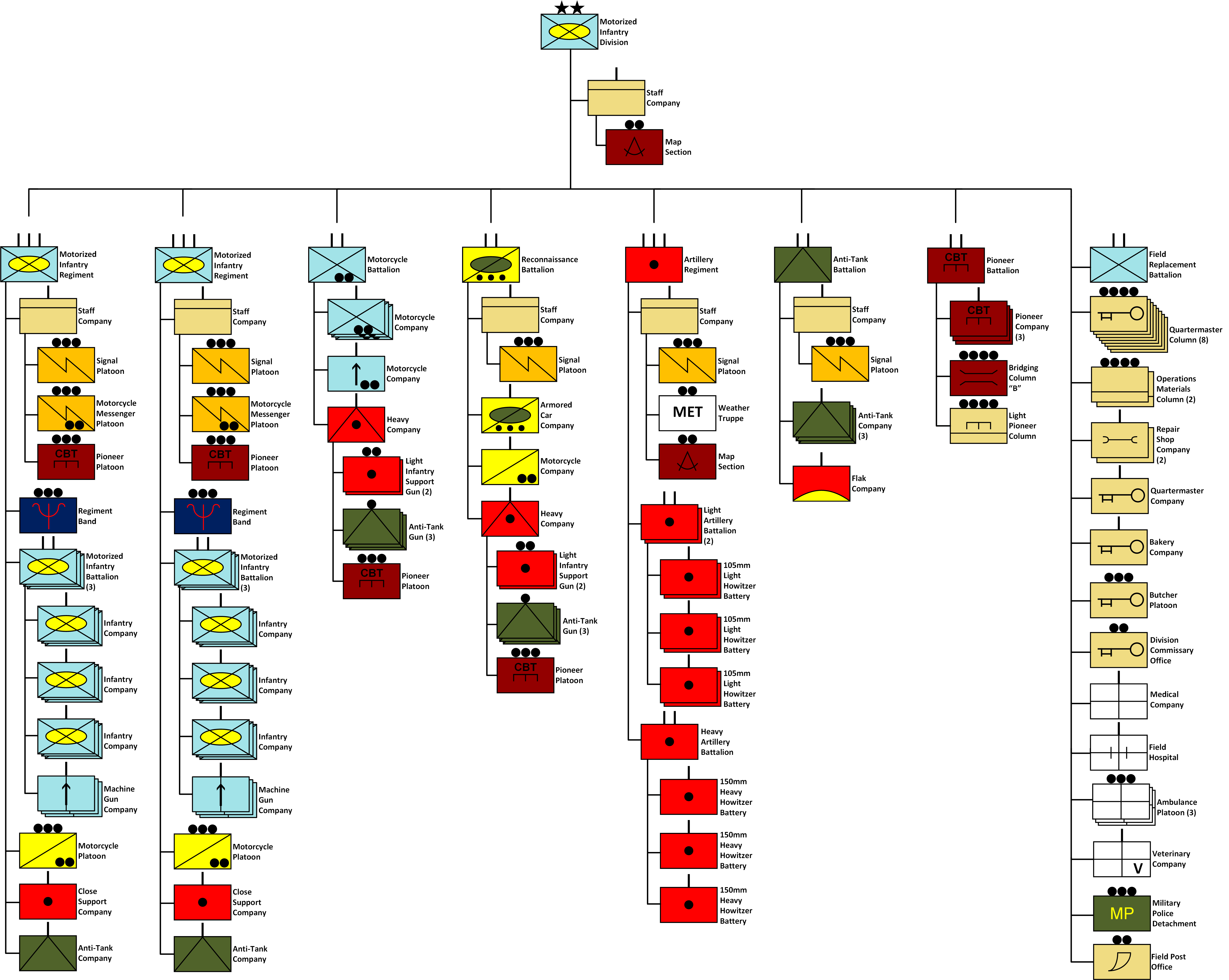
Motorized Infantry Division 1941

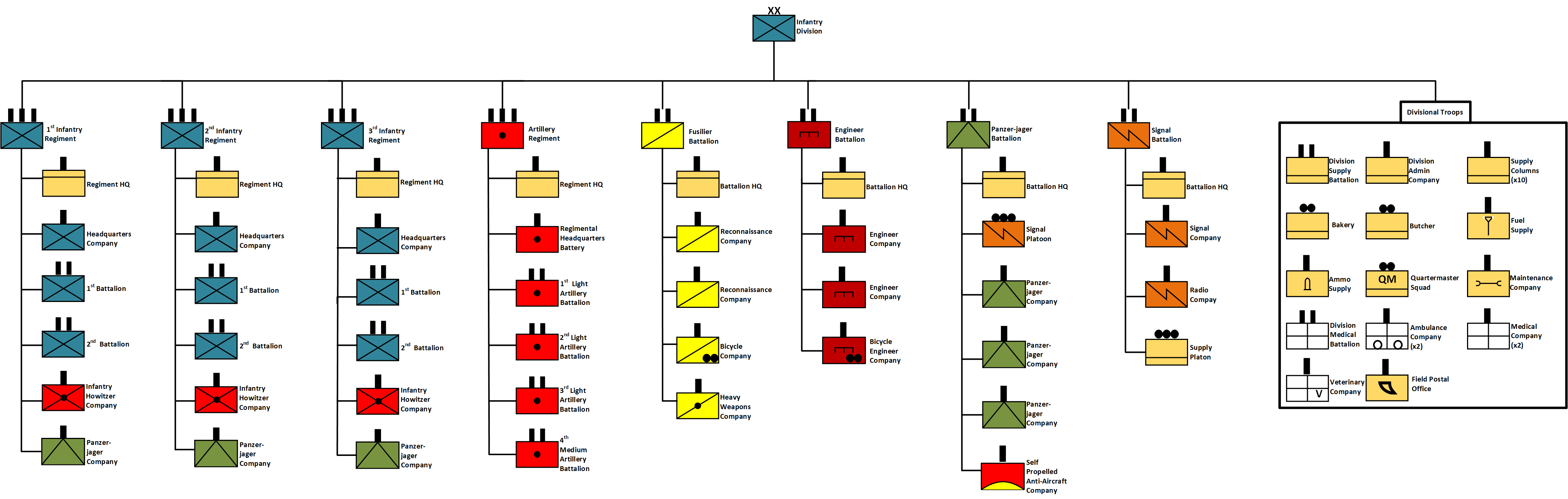
Motorized Infantry Division 1943

The backbone of the Heer was the infantry division. Of the 154 divisions deployed against the Soviet Union in 1941, including reserves, there were 100 infantry, 19 panzer, 11 motorized, 9 security, 5 Waffen-SS, 4 "light", 4 mountain, 1 SS-police, and 1 cavalry. A typical infantry division in June 1941 had 17,734 men organized into the following sub-units:

- three infantry regiments with staff and communications units
  - three battalions with:
    - three infantry companies
    - one heavy weapons company
  - one anti-tank company (mot.)
  - one artillery company
  - one reconnaissance unit
- one tank destroyer battalion with:
  - three companies (each with twelve 3.7 cm guns)
- one artillery regiment
  - three battalions
    - three batteries
- one pioneer battalion
- one communications unit
- one field replacement battalion
- Supply, medical, veterinary, mail, and police

Infantry divisions were raised in waves (Aufstellungswelle), sets of divisions with a standardized table of organization and equipment. In general the later waves (i.e., the higher-numbered divisions) were of lower quality than the earlier ones.

==== Numbered divisions ====
Divisions are listed by number and reflect their lineage where names or designations were changed over time.

===== 1st to 99th =====
- 1st Infantry Division
- 2nd Motorized Infantry Division (later 12th Panzer Division)
- 3rd Motorized Infantry Division (later 3rd Panzergrenadier Division)
- 4th Infantry Division (later 14th Panzer Division)
- 5th Infantry Division (later 5th Light Infantry Division, 5th Jäger Division)
  - Not related to the 5th Light Division.
- 6th Infantry Division (later 6th Grenadier Division, 6th Volksgrenadier Division)
- 7th Infantry Division
- 8th Infantry Division (later 8th Light Infantry Division, 8th Jäger Division)
- 9th Infantry Division (later 9th Volksgrenadier Division)
- 10th Infantry Division (later 10th Motorized Infantry Division, 10th Panzergrenadier Division)
- 11th Infantry Division
- 12th Infantry Division (later 12th Volksgrenadier Division)
- 13th Motorized Infantry Division (later 13th Panzer Division, Panzer Division Feldherrnhalle 2)
- 14th Infantry Division (later 14th Motorized Infantry Division, then 14th Infantry Division again)
- 14th Luftwaffe Infantry Division
  - This unit was originally in the Luftwaffe as the 14th Luftwaffe Field Division.
- 15th Infantry Division
- 15th Panzergrenadier Division (previously 33rd Infantry Division, 15th Panzer Division)
  - Not related to 15th Infantry Division.
- 16th Infantry Division (later split into –)
  - 16th Panzer Division, and
  - 16th Motorized Infantry Division (later 16th Panzergrenadier Division, 116th Panzer Division)
- 16th Luftwaffe Infantry Division (later 16th Volksgrenadier Division)
  - This unit was originally in the Luftwaffe as the 16th Luftwaffe Field Division.
- 17th Infantry Division
- 18th Infantry Division (later 18th Motorised Infantry Division, 18th Panzergrenadier Division)
- 18th Volksgrenadier Division
  - Not related to the 18th Infantry Division.
- 19th Infantry Division (later 19th Panzer Division)
- 19th Grenadier Division (later 19th Volksgrenadier Division)
  - This unit was originally in the Luftwaffe as the 19th Luftwaffe Field Division (later 19th Luftwaffe Sturm Division)
- 20th Infantry Division (later 20th Motorized Infantry Division, 20th Panzergrenadier Division)
- 21st Infantry Division
- 22nd Infantry Division (later 22nd Air Landing Division, 22nd Volksgrenadier Division)
- 23rd Infantry Division (later 26th Panzer Division)
  - After being reorganized as the 26th Panzer Division, some of the 23rd Infantry Division's original components were used to create a new 23rd Infantry Division.
- 24th Infantry Division
- 25th Infantry Division (later 25th Motorized Infantry Division, 25th Panzergrenadier Division)
- 26th Infantry Division (later 26th Volksgrenadier Division)
- 27th Infantry Division (later 17th Panzer Division)
- 28th Light Infantry Division (later 28th Jäger Division)
- 29th Infantry Division (later 29th Motorized Infantry Division, 29th Panzergrenadier Division)
- 30th Infantry Division
- 31st Infantry Division (later 31st Grenadier Division, 31st Volksgrenadier Division)
- 32nd Infantry Division
- 33rd Infantry Division (later 15th Panzer Division, 15th Panzergrenadier Division)
- 34th Infantry Division
- 35th Infantry Division
- 36th Infantry Division (later 36th Motorized Infantry Division, 36th Infantry Division again, 36th Grenadier Division, and 36th Volksgrenadier Division)
- 38th Infantry Division
- 39th Infantry Division (later 41st Fortress Division, 41st Infantry Division)
- 41st Infantry Division (previously 39th Infantry Division, 41st Fortress Division)
- 42nd Jäger Division (previously 187th Reserve Division)
- 44th Infantry Division (later 44th Reichsgrenadier Division Hoch und Deutschmeister)
- 45th Infantry Division (later 45th Grenadier Division, 45th Volksgrenadier Division)
- 46th Infantry Division (later 46th Volksgrenadier Division)
- 47th Infantry Division (previously Division Nr. 156, 156th Reserve Division; later 47th Volksgrenadier Division)
- 48th Infantry Division (previously Division Nr. 171, 171st Reserve Division; later 48th Volksgrenadier Division)
- 49th Infantry Division (previously Division Nr. 191, 191st Reserve Division)
- 50th Infantry Division (previously Grenzkommandantur Küstrin)
- 52nd Infantry Division (later 52nd Field Training Division, 52nd Security Division)
- 56th Infantry Division
- 57th Infantry Division
- 58th Infantry Division
- 59th Infantry Division
- 60th Infantry Division (later 60th Motorized Infantry Division, Panzergrenadier Division Feldherrnhalle, and Panzer Division Feldherrnhalle 1)
- 61st Infantry Division (later 61st Volksgrenadier Division)
- 62nd Infantry Division (later 62nd Volksgrenadier Division)
- 63rd Infantry Division (planned but not formed)
- 64th Infantry Division
- 65th Infantry Division
- 68th Infantry Division
- 69th Infantry Division
- 70th Infantry Division
- 71st Infantry Division
- 72nd Infantry Division
- 73rd Infantry Division
- 74th Infantry Division (planned but not formed)
- 75th Infantry Division
- 76th Infantry Division
- 77th Infantry Division
- 78th Infantry Division (later 78th Sturm Division, 78th Grenadier Division, 78th Volksgrenadier Division, and finally 78 Volks-Sturm Division)
- 79th Infantry Division (later 79th Volksgrenadier Division)
- 80th Infantry Division
- 81st Infantry Division
- 82nd Infantry Division
- 83rd Infantry Division
- 84th Infantry Division
- 85th Infantry Division
- 86th Infantry Division
- 87th Infantry Division
- 88th Infantry Division
- 89th Infantry Division
- 90th Light Infantry Division (previously the Division z.b.V. Afrika; later 90th Light Afrika Division, 90th Panzergrenadier Division)
- 91st Infantry Division (later 91st Air Landing Division)
- 92nd Infantry Division
- 93rd Infantry Division
- 94th Infantry Division
- 95th Infantry Division (later 95th Volksgrenadier Division)
- 96th Infantry Division
- 97th Light Infantry Division (later 97th Jäger Division)
- 98th Infantry Division
- 99th Light Infantry Division (later 7th Mountain Division)

===== 100th to 199th =====
- 100th Light Infantry Division (later 100th Jäger Division)
- 101st Light Infantry Division (later 101st Jäger Division)
- 102nd Infantry Division
- 104th Jäger Division (previously 704th Infantry Division)
- 106th Infantry Division
- 110th Infantry Division
- 111th Infantry Division
- 112th Infantry Division
- 113th Infantry Division
- 114th Jäger Division (previously 714th Infantry Division)
- 117th Jäger Division (previously 717th Infantry Division)
- 118th Jäger Division (previously 718th Infantry Division)
- 121st Infantry Division
- 122nd Infantry Division
- 123rd Infantry Division
- 125th Infantry Division
- 126th Infantry Division
- 129th Infantry Division
- 131st Infantry Division
- 132nd Infantry Division
- 133rd Fortress Division
- 134th Infantry Division
- Division z.b.V. 136
- 137th Infantry Division
- Division z.b.V. 140 (previously Shadow Division Steiermark; later 9th Mountain Division)
- Division Nr. 141 (later 141st Reserve Division)
- Division Nr. 143 (later 143rd Reserve Division)
- Division Nr. 147 (later 147th Reserve Division)
- Division Nr. 148 (later 148th Reserve Division, 148th Infantry Division
- 149th Field Training Division (planned but not formed)
- 150th Field Training Division (planned but not formed)
- 151st Field Training Division (planned but not formed)
- Division Nr. 151 (later 151st Reserve Division)
- 152nd Field Training Division (planned but not formed)
- Division Nr. 152
- Division Nr. 153 (later 153rd Reserve Division, 153rd Field Training Division, 153rd Grenadier Division)
- Division Nr. 154 (later 154th Reserve Division, 154th Field Training Division, 154th Infantry Division)
- Division Nr. 155 (later Division Nr. 155 (mot.), Panzer Division Nr. 155, 155th Reserve Panzer Division)
- 155th Field Training Division (later 155th Infantry Division)
  - Not related to Division Nr. 155.
- Division Nr. 156 (later 156th Reserve Division, 47th Infantry Division, 47th Volksgrenadier Division)
- 156th Field Training Division (later 156th Infantry Division)
  - Not related to Division Nr. 156
- Division Nr. 157 (later 157th Reserve Division, 157th Mountain Division, 8th Mountain Division)
- Division Nr. 158 (later 158th Reserve Division)
- 158th Infantry Division
  - Not related to Division Nr. 158.
- Division Nr. 159 (later 159th Reserve Division, 159th Infantry Division)
- Division Nr. 160 (later 160th Reserve Division, 160th Infantry Division)
- 161st Infantry Division
- 162nd Infantry Division (later 162nd Turkoman Division, with foreign troops)
- 163rd Infantry Division
- 164th Infantry Division (later Fortress Division Kreta, which split into –)
  - Fortress Brigade Kreta
  - 164th Light Afrika Division
- Division Nr. 165 (later 165th Reserve Division)
- Division Nr. 166 (later 166th Reserve Division, 166th Infantry Division)
- 167th Infantry Division (later 585th Volksgrenadier Division, 167th Volksgrenadier Division)
- 168th Infantry Division
- 169th Infantry Division
- 170th Infantry Division
- Division Nr. 171 (later 171st Reserve Division, 48th Infantry Division, 48th Volksgrenadier Division)
- Division Nr. 172 (later 172nd Reserve Division)
- Division Nr. 173 (later 173rd Reserve Division)
- Division Nr. 174 (later 174th Reserve Division)
- Division Nr. 176 (later 176th Infantry Division)
- Division Nr. 177
- Division Nr. 178 (later Division Nr. 178 (mot.)
- 180th Infantry Division
- 181st Infantry Division
- Division Nr. 182 (later 182nd Reserve Division, 182nd Infantry Division)
- 183rd Infantry Division (later 564th Volksgrenadier Division, 183rd Volksgrenadier Division)
- 187th Reserve Division (later 42nd Jäger Division)
- Division Nr. 188 (later 188th Reserve Mountain Division, 188th Mountain Division)
- 189th Reserve Division (later 189th Infantry Division)
- 190th Infantry Division
- Division Nr. 191 (later 191st Reserve Division, 49th Infantry Division)
- 196th Infantry Division
- 197th Infantry Division
- 198th Infantry Division
- 199th Infantry Division

===== 201st to 299th =====
- 201st Security Division
- 203rd Security Division (later 203rd Infantry Division)
- 205th Infantry Division (previously Grenzschutz Abschnittskommando Freiburg, 14th Landwehr Division)
- 206th Infantry Division
- 207th Infantry Division (later split into –)
  - 207th Security Division, 281st Security Division, and
  - 286th Security Division
- 208th Infantry Division
- 209th Infantry Division
- 210th Coastal Defense Division
- 211th Infantry Division (later 211th Volksgrenadier Division)
- 212th Infantry Division (later 578th Volksgrenadier Division, then renamed 212th Volksgrenadier Division)
- 213th Infantry Division (later split into –)
  - 213th Security Division, 286th Security Division, and
  - 403rd Security Division
- 214th Infantry Division
- 215th Infantry Division
- 216th Infantry Division
- 217th Infantry Division
- 218th Infantry Division
- 219th Infantry Division
- 221st Infantry Division (later split into –)
  - 221st Security Division, 444th Security Division, and
  - 454th Security Division
- 223rd Infantry Division
- 225th Infantry Division
- 226th Infantry Division
- 227th Infantry Division
- 228th Infantry Division
- 230th Coastal Defense Division (previously Küstenschutzverband Alta)
- 231st Infantry Division
- 232nd Infantry Division
- 233rd Motorized Division (later 233rd Panzergrenadier Division)
- 237th Infantry Division
- 239th Infantry Division
- 240th Infantry Division z.b.V. (later LXXXVIII Army Corps)
- 242nd Infantry Division (previously Division A)
- 243rd Static Infantry Division (previously Division B)
- 244th Infantry Division (previously Division E)
- 245th Infantry Division (previously Division D)
- 246th Infantry Division (later 565th Volksgrenadier Division, 246th Volksgrenadier Division)
- 249th Infantry Division
- 250th Infantry Division (División Azul, the Spanish "Blue" Division in German service)
- 251st Infantry Division
- 252nd Infantry Division
- 253rd Infantry Division
- 254th Infantry Division
- 255th Infantry Division
- 256th Infantry Division (Later 256th Volksgrenadier Division)
- 257th Infantry Division (Later 257th Volksgrenadier Division)
- 258th Infantry Division
- 260th Infantry Division
- 262nd Infantry Division
- 263rd Infantry Division
- 264th Infantry Division
- 265th Infantry Division
- 266th Infantry Division
- 267th Infantry Division
- 268th Infantry Division
- 269th Infantry Division
- 270th Fortress Infantry Division
- 271st Infantry Division (later 271st Volksgrenadier Division)
- 272nd Infantry Division (later 272nd Volksgrenadier Division)
- 273rd Infantry Division
- 274th Infantry Division
- 275th Infantry Division
- 276th Infantry Division (later 276th Volksgrenadier Division)
- 277th Infantry Division (later 277th Volksgrenadier Division)
- 278th Infantry Division
- 279th Infantry Division (planned but not formed)
- 280th Infantry Division
- 281st Security Division (previously 207th Infantry Division; later 281st Infantry Division)
- 282nd Infantry Division
- 285th Security Division
- 286th Security Division (previously 207th Infantry Division and 213th Infantry Division; later 286th Infantry Division)
- 286th Training Division (planned but not formed)
- 290th Infantry Division
- 291st Infantry Division
- 292nd Infantry Division
- 293rd Infantry Division
- 294th Infantry Division
- 295th Infantry Division (later 295th Static Infantry Division)
- 296th Infantry Division
- 297th Infantry Division
- 298th Infantry Division
- 299th Infantry Division

===== 300th to 999th =====
- 300th Special Infantry Division
- Division z.b.V. 300
  - Not related to 300th Special Infantry Division
- 301st Infantry Division
- 302nd Static Infantry Division (later 302nd Infantry Division)
- 304th Infantry Division
- 305th Infantry Division
- 306th Infantry Division
- 309th Infantry Division (later Infantry Division Berlin)
- 311th Infantry Division
- 319th Static Infantry Division
- 320th Infantry Division (later 320th Volksgrenadier Division)
- 321st Infantry Division
- 323rd Infantry Division
- 324th Infantry Division
- 325th Infantry Division Jütland
- 325th Security Division
  - Not related to 325th Infantry Division Jütland
- 326th Infantry Division (later 326th Volksgrenadier Division)
- 327th Infantry Division
- 328th Infantry Division
- 329th Infantry Division
- 330th Infantry Division
- 331st Infantry Division
- Division z.b.V. 331
  - Not related to 331st Infantry Division
- 332nd Static Infantry Division (later 332nd Infantry Division)
- 333rd Infantry Division
- 334th Infantry Division
- 335th Infantry Division
- 336th Infantry Division
- 337th Infantry Division
- 337th Volksgrenadier Division (previously 570th Volksgrenadier Division)
  - Not related to 337th Infantry Division
- 338th Infantry Division
- 339th Infantry Division
- 340th Infantry Division (later 572nd Volksgrenadier Division, 340th Volksgrenadier Division)
- 342nd Infantry Division
- 343rd Infantry Division
- 344th Static Infantry Division (later 344th Infantry Division)
- 345th Motorized Infantry Division
- 346th Infantry Division
- 347th Infantry Division (later 347th Volksgrenadier Division)
- 348th Infantry Division
- 349th Infantry Division
- 351st Infantry Division (previously Oberfeldkommandantur 587)
- 352nd Infantry Division (later 581st Volksgrenadier Division, 352nd Volksgrenadier Division)
- 353rd Infantry Division
- 355th Infantry Division
- 356th Infantry Division
- 357th Infantry Division
- 358th Infantry Division (previously Stab Oberfeldkommandantur 540 Kielce)
- 359th Infantry Division
- 361st Infantry Division (later 569th Volksgrenadier Division, 361st Volksgrenadier Division)
- 362nd Infantry Division
- 363rd Infantry Division (later 566th Volksgrenadier Division, 363rd Volksgrenadier Division)
- 364th Infantry Division
- 365th Infantry Division (previously Stab Oberfeldkommandantur Tarnow)
- 367th Infantry Division
- 369th (Croatian) Infantry Division (previously Infantry Regiment 369 (Croatian)
- 370th Infantry Division
- 371st Infantry Division
- 372nd Infantry Division (previously Stab Oberfeldkommandantur 581)
- 373rd (Croatian) Infantry Division
- 376th Infantry Division
- 377th Infantry Division
- 379th Infantry Division (previously Division z.b.V. 424)
- 381st Field Training Division
- 382nd Field Training Division
- 383rd Infantry Division
- 384th Infantry Division
- 385th Infantry Division
- 386th Infantry Division (previously Stab Oberfeldkommandantur 530 Warschau)
- 386th Motorized Infantry Division
  - Not related to 386th Infantry Division
- 387th Infantry Division
- 388th Field Training Division (later Field Training Division Nord, Field Training Division Kurland and Infantry Division Kurland)
- 389th Infantry Division
- 390th Field Training Division (later 390th Security Division)
- 391st Field Training Division (later 391st Security Division)
- 392nd (Croatian) Infantry Division (previously Aufstellungsstab Neuhammer)
- 393rd Infantry Division (previously Division z.b.V. 423)
- 394th Field Training Division (planned but not formed)
- 395th Infantry Division (previously Grenzschutz Abschnittskommando 15, 521st Infantry Division)
- 399th Infantry Division (previously Division z.b.V. 421)
- Division z.b.V. 401 (previously Division z.b.V. 422; Later Division Nr. 401)
- Division z.b.V. 402 (later Division Nr. 402)
- 402nd Training Division
  - Not related to Division z.b.V. 402
- 403rd Security Division (previously Division z.b.V. 403)
- Division z.b.V. 404 (later Division Nr. 404, 404th Replacement Training Division)
- Division z.b.V. 405 (later Division Nr. 405)
- Division z.b.V. 406
- Division z.b.V. 407 (later Division Nr. 407)
- Division z.b.V. 408 (later Division Nr. 408)
- Division z.b.V. 409 (later Division Nr. 409)
- Division z.b.V. 410
- Division z.b.V. 411
- Division z.b.V. 412 (previously Division z.b.V. 445)
- Division z.b.V. 413
- Division Nr. 413
  - Not related to Division z.b.V. 413
- 416th Infantry Division
- Division z.b.V. 417
- Division Nr. 418
- Division z.b.V. 421 (later 399th Infantry Division)
- Division z.b.V. 422 (later Division z.b.V. 401, Division Nr. 401)
- Division z.b.V. 423 (later 393rd Infantry Division)
- Division z.b.V. 424 (later 379th Infantry Division)
- Division z.b.V. 425 (later Kommandeur der Ersatztruppen 100)
- Division z.b.V. 426 (later 556th Infantry Division)
- Division z.b.V. 427 (later 557th Infantry Division)
- Division z.b.V. 428
- Division z.b.V. 429
- 430th Infantry Division z.b.V.
- Division z.b.V. 431
- Division z.b.V. 432 (later Division Nr. 432)
- 433rd Motorized Replacement Division (previously Division Nr. 433)
- Division Nr. 438
- Division z.b.V. 441 (later 554th Infantry Division)
- Division z.b.V. 442
- Division z.b.V. 443 (later 555th Infantry Division)
- 444th Security Division (previously Division z.b.V. 444)
- Division z.b.V. 445 (later Division z.b.V. 412)
- 454th Security Division (previously Division z.b.V. 454)
- Division z.b.V. 460
- Division Nr. 461
- Division Nr. 462 (previously Division Nanzig; later 462nd Infantry Division, 462nd Volksgrenadier Division)
- Division Nr. 463
- Division Nr. 464 (later 464th Training Division)
- Division Nr. 465
- Division Nr. 466
- Division Nr. 467 (later Training Division Bayern)
- Division Nr. 469
- Division Nr. 471
- Division Nr. 476
- Division Nr. 480
- Division Nr. 487
- Division Nr. 490
- 521st Infantry Division (previously Grenzschutz Abschnittskommando 15; later 395th Infantry Division)
- 526th Infantry Division (previously Grenzschutz Abschnittskommando 9; later Division Aachen, Division Nr. 526 Aachen and 526th Reserve Division)
- Division z.b.V. 537 (previously Grenzschutz Abschnittskommando 10)
- Division z.b.V. 538 (previously Grenzschutz Abschnittskommando 20)
- 538th Frontier Guard Division
  - Not related to Division z.b.V. 538
- Division z.b.V. 539 (previously Landesschützen Kommandeur 1)
- Division z.b.V. 540 (previously Landesschützen Kommandeur 2)
- 541st Grenadier Division (later 541st Volksgrenadier Division)
- 542nd Infantry Division (later 542nd Grenadier Division, 542nd Volksgrenadier Division)
- 543rd Grenadier Division
- 544th Grenadier Division (later 544th Volksgrenadier Division)
- 545th Grenadier Division (later 545th Volksgrenadier Division)
- 546th Grenadier Division
- 547th Grenadier Division (later 547th Volksgrenadier Division)
- 548th Grenadier Division (later 548th Volksgrenadier Division)
- 549th Grenadier Division (later 549th Volksgrenadier Division)
- 550th Grenadier Division
- 551st Grenadier Division (later 551st Volksgrenadier Division)
- 552nd Grenadier Division
- 553rd Grenadier Division (later 553rd Volksgrenadier Division)
- 554th Infantry Division (previously Division z.b.V. 441)
- 555th Infantry Division (previously Division z.b.V. 443)
- 556th Infantry Division (previously Division z.b.V. 426)
- 557th Infantry Division (previously Division z.b.V. 427)
- 558th Grenadier Division (later 558th Volksgrenadier Division)
- 559th Grenadier Division (later 559th Volksgrenadier Division)
- 560th Grenadier Division (later 560th Volksgrenadier Division)
- 561st Grenadier Division Ostpreußen 1 (later 561st Volksgrenadier Division)
- 562nd Grenadier Division Ostpreußen 2 (later 562nd Volksgrenadier Division)
- 563rd Grenadier Division (previously Grenadier-Lehr Division; later 563rd Volksgrenadier Division)
- 564th Grenadier Division (later 564th Volksgrenadier Division)
- 565th Volksgrenadier Division (previously 246th Infantry Division; later 246th Volksgrenadier Division)
- 566th Volksgrenadier Division (previously 363rd Infantry Division; later 363rd Volksgrenadier Division)
- 567th Volksgrenadier Division
- 568th Volksgrenadier Division
- 569th Volksgrenadier Division
- 570th Volksgrenadier Division
- 571st Volksgrenadier Division
- 572nd Volksgrenadier Division
- 573rd Volksgrenadier Division
- 574th Volksgrenadier Division
- 575th Volksgrenadier Division
- 576th Volksgrenadier Division
- 577th Volksgrenadier Division
- 578th Volksgrenadier Division (previously 212th Infantry Division; later 212th Volksgrenadier Division)
- 579th Volksgrenadier Division
- 580th Volksgrenadier Division
- 581st Volksgrenadier Division (previously 352nd Infantry Division; later 352nd Volksgrenadier Division)
- 582nd Volksgrenadier Division
- 583rd Volksgrenadier Division
- 584th Volksgrenadier Division
- 585th Volksgrenadier Division
- 586th Volksgrenadier Division
- 587th Volksgrenadier Division
- 588th Volksgrenadier Division
- 600th (Russian) Infantry Division
- Division z.b.V. 601
- Division z.b.V. 602
- Division z.b.V. 603
- Division z.b.V. 604
- Division z.b.V. 605 (previously Festungs Kommandeur Lötzen)
- Division z.b.V. 606 (later 606th Infantry Division)
- Division z.b.V. 607 (later Festungskommandant Pillau)
- Division z.b.V. 608
- Division z.b.V. 609
- Division z.b.V. 610
- Division z.b.V. 611
- Division z.b.V. 612 (later Corps Oder)
- Division z.b.V. 613
- Division z.b.V. 614
- Division z.b.V. 615
- Division z.b.V. 616
- Division z.b.V. 617
- Division z.b.V. 618
- Division z.b.V. 619
- 650th (Russian) Infantry Division
- 702nd Infantry Division (previously 702nd Static Infantry Division)
- 703rd Infantry Division
- 704th Infantry Division (later 104th Jäger Division)
- 707th Infantry Division (later 707th Security Division)
- 708th Infantry Division (later 708th Coastal Defense Division, 573rd Volksgrenadier Division, 708th Volksgrenadier Division)
- 709th Static Infantry Division
- 710th Infantry Division
- 711th Infantry Division
- 712th Infantry Division
- 713th Infantry Division
- 714th Infantry Division (later 114th Jäger Division)
- 715th Infantry Division
- 716th Static Infantry Division (later 716th Volksgrenadier Division)
- 717th Infantry Division (later 117th Jäger Division)
- 718th Infantry Division (later 118th Jäger Division)
- 719th Infantry Division
- Division Nr. 805
- Division Nr. 905 (previously Division ''von Witzleben'')
- 999th Light Afrika Division (previously Afrika Brigade 999)

==== Named divisions ====
- Führer Begleit Division (previously Führer Begleit Battalion, Führer Begleit Brigade)
- Führer Grenadier Division (previously Führer Grenadier Battalion, Führer Grenadier Brigade)
- Panzergrenadier Division Brandenburg (previously Brandenburg Battalion, Brandenburg Regiment and Infantry Division Brandenburg)
- Panzergrenadier Division Feldherrnhalle (previously 60th Infantry Division, 60th Motorized Infantry Division; later Panzer Division Feldherrnhalle 1)
- Panzergrenadier Division Großdeutschland (previously Wachregiment Berlin, Infantry Regiment Großdeutschland and Motorized Infantry Division Großdeutschland)
- Grenadier Lehr Division (later 563rd Grenadier Division, 563rd Volksgrenadier Division)
- Sturm Division Rhodos (previously Sturmbrigade Rhodos)
- Jäger Division Alpen
- Division A (later 242nd Infantry Division)
- Division B (later 243rd Infantry Division)
- Division C
- Division D (later 245th Infantry Division)
- Division E (later 244th Infantry Division)
- Division Aachen
- Division Baltzer
- Division Brand
- Division Nanzig (later Division Nr. 462, 462nd Infantry Division, 462nd Volksgrenadier Division)
- Division Rässler
- Division ''von Broich/von Manteuffel''
- Division von Witzleben (later Division Nr. 905)
- Division z.b.V. (L)
- Division z.b.V. (M)
- Freiwilligen-Stamm Division
- Infantry Division Berlin (previously 309th Infantry Division)
- Infantry Division Döberitz
- Infantry Division ''Ferdinand von Schill''
- Infantry Division Hamburg
- Infantry Division Seeland
- Shadow Division Breslau
- Shadow Division Böhmen (later 237th Infantry Division)
- Shadow Division Dresden
- Shadow Division Schlesien
- Shadow Division Ostpreußen
- Sardinian Infantry Division

=== Landwehr divisions ===
- 14th Landwehr Division (previously Grenzschutz Abschnittskommando Freiburg; later 205th Infantry Division)
- 97th Landwehr Division (planned but not formed)

=== Mountain divisions ===
- 1st Mountain Division (previously Mountain Brigade; later 1st Volksgebirgs Division)
- 2nd Mountain Division
- 3rd Mountain Division
- 4th Mountain Division
- 5th Mountain Division
- 6th Mountain Division
- 7th Mountain Division (previously 99th Light Infantry Division)
- 8th Mountain Division (previously Division Nr. 157, 157th Reserve Division, 157th Mountain Division)
- 9th Mountain Division (previously Shadow Division Steiermark Division zbV 140)
- 188th Mountain Division (previously Division Nr. 188, 188th Reserve Mountain Division)

=== Ski division ===
- 1st Ski Division (previously 1st Ski Brigade)

=== Cavalry divisions ===
According to Davies, the Cavalry divisions were mounted infantry and the Cossack divisions were "true cavalry", modelled on the Russian cavalry divisions.

- 1st Cavalry Division (previously 1st Cavalry Brigade; later 24th Panzer Division)
- 3rd Cavalry Division (previously Cavalry Regiment Mitte, 3rd Cavalry Brigade)
- 4th Cavalry Division (previously 4th Cavalry Brigade)
- Cossack Cavalry Division (This Division was transferred to the Waffen-SS, where it was split to form the 1st & 2nd Cossack Cavalry Divisions)

=== Artillery divisions ===
- 18th Artillery Division (previously 18th Panzer Division)
- 309th Artillery Division
- 310th Artillery Division
- 311th Artillery Division
- 312th Artillery Division
- 397th Artillery Division

=== Named fortress divisions ===
- Fortress Division Breslau
- Fortress Division Danzig
- Fortress Division Frankfurt/Oder
- Fortress Division Gotenhafen
- Fortress Division Kreta (previously 164th Infantry Division; later 164th Light Afrika Division)
- Fortress Division Stettin
- Fortress Division Swinemünde
- Fortress Division Warschau

=== Named training divisions ===
- Training Division Bayern (previously Division Nr. 467)
- Field Training Division Nord (previously 388th Field Training Division; later Field Training Division Kurland)

=== RAD divisions ===
In 1945 the Reichsarbeitsdienst (Reich Labour Service) transferred personnel to the army to form new divisions as part of the 35th Aufstellungswelle, the last of the war.

- RAD-Division Nr. 1 Schlageter
- RAD-Division Nr. 2 Friedrich Ludwig Jahn
- RAD-Division Nr. 3 Theodor Körner
- RAD-Division Nr. 4 Güstrow

=== Field replacement divisions ===
- Field Replacement Division A
- Field Replacement Division B
- Field Replacement Division C
- Field Replacement Division D
- Field Replacement Division E
- Field Replacement Division F

== Navy (Kriegsmarine) ==
=== Marine divisions ===
- 1st Marine Division
- 2nd Marine Division
- 3rd Marine Division
- 11th Marine Division
- 16th Marine Division
- Marine Division Gotenhafen

== Air Force (Luftwaffe) ==
=== Hermann Göring divisions ===
The Hermann Göring formations grew from a single police detachment to an entire armored corps over the course of the war. The later epithet Fallschirm ("parachute") was purely honorific.

- Hermann Göring Division (later Panzer Division Hermann Göring, 1st Parachute Panzer Division Hermann Göring)
- Parachute Panzergrenadier Division 2 Hermann Göring

=== Airborne divisions ===
To keep its existence secret, the first German airborne division was named as if a Flieger ("flier") division in the series of Luftwaffe divisions that controlled air assets rather than ground troops-named 7th Flieger Division (often translated 7th Air Division - which see: 1st Parachute Division (Germany)) The division was later reorganized to start a series of nominally airborne divisions. Though named Fallschirmjäger ("paratrooper") divisions, only some of them participated in airdrops in the early part of the war. Whilst the first five divisions received full paratrooper training, the remaining divisions did not and in practice operated as ordinary infantry throughout their existence. The lower-numbered ones earned and maintained an elite status, but quality generally declined among the higher-numbered divisions.

- 1st Parachute Division (Previously 7th Flieger Division)
- 2nd Parachute Division
- 3rd Parachute Division
- 4th Parachute Division
- 5th Parachute Division
- 6th Parachute Division
- 7th Parachute Division (previously Group Erdmann)
- 8th Parachute Division
- 9th Parachute Division
- 10th Parachute Division
- 11th Parachute Division (started to be formed March 1945. fought as battle groups only)
- 20th Parachute Division (Formation ordered March 1945 in the Netherlands, from Parachute Training and Replacement Division. However formation was not completed beyond cadre.)
- 21st Parachute Division (Formation ordered April 1945 in the Netherlands, as a Field-Training Division. However formation was not completed beyond cadre.)

=== Field divisions ===
Luftwaffe Field Divisions were ordinary infantry divisions organized from Luftwaffe personnel made available after mid-war due to problems with manpower. They were originally Luftwaffe units but were later handed over to the Heer, retaining their numbering but with Luftwaffe attached to distinguish them from similarly numbered divisions already existing in the Heer.

- 1st Luftwaffe Field Division (previously Flieger Regiment 10)
- 2nd Luftwaffe Field Division
- 3rd Luftwaffe Field Division
- 4th Luftwaffe Field Division (previously Flieger Regiment 14)
- 5th Luftwaffe Field Division (previously Flieger Regiment 16)
- 6th Luftwaffe Field Division (previously Flieger Regiment 21)
- 7th Luftwaffe Field Division
- 8th Luftwaffe Field Division (previously Flieger Regiment 42)
- 9th Luftwaffe Field Division (previously Flieger Regiment 62)
- 10th Luftwaffe Field Division (previously Flieger Regiment 72)
- 11th Luftwaffe Field Division (previously Flieger Regiment 31)
- 12th Luftwaffe Field Division (previously Flieger Regiment 12)
- 13th Luftwaffe Field Division (previously Flieger Regiment 13)
- 14th Luftwaffe Field Division (previously Flieger Regiment 61)
- 15th Luftwaffe Field Division
- 16th Luftwaffe Field Division
  - Eventually transferred to the Heer as 16th Luftwaffe Infantry Division (later 16th Volksgrenadier Division)
- 17th Luftwaffe Field Division
- 18th Luftwaffe Field Division (previously Flieger Regiment 52)
- 19th Luftwaffe Field Division (later 19th Luftwaffe Sturm Division)
  - Eventually transferred to the Heer as 19th Grenadier Division (later 19th Volksgrenadier Division)
- 20th Luftwaffe Field Division (previously Flieger Regiment 23 later; 20th Luftwaffe Sturm Division)
- 21st Luftwaffe Field Division (previously Luftwaffe Division Meindl)
- 22nd Luftwaffe Field Division (not formed, its sub-units were attached to other divisions)

=== Training divisions ===
- 1st Luftwaffe Training Division
- Parachute Training and Replacement Division (see 20th Parachute Division)

=== Anti-Aircraft divisions ===
These were headquarters for controlling aggregates of flak ("anti-aircraft artillery") assets rather than ordinary combined arms divisions organized for ground combat.

- 1st Anti-Aircraft Division
- 2nd Anti-Aircraft Division
- 3rd Anti-Aircraft Division
- 4th Anti-Aircraft Division
- 5th Anti-Aircraft Division
- 6th Anti-Aircraft Division
- 7th Anti-Aircraft Division
- 8th Anti-Aircraft Division
- 9th Anti-Aircraft Division
- 10th Anti-Aircraft Division
- 11th Anti-Aircraft Division
- 12th Anti-Aircraft Division
- 13th Anti-Aircraft Division
- 14th Anti-Aircraft Division
- 15th Anti-Aircraft Division
- 16th Anti-Aircraft Division
- 17th Anti-Aircraft Division
- 18th Anti-Aircraft Division
- 19th Anti-Aircraft Division
- 20th Anti-Aircraft Division
- 21st Anti-Aircraft Division
- 22nd Anti-Aircraft Division
- 23rd Anti-Aircraft Division
- 24th Anti-Aircraft Division
- 25th Anti-Aircraft Division
- 26th Anti-Aircraft Division
- 27th Anti-Aircraft Division
- 28th Anti-Aircraft Division
- 29th Anti-Aircraft Division
- 30th Anti-Aircraft Division
- 31st Anti-Aircraft Division

== Waffen-SS (Schutzstaffel) ==
All divisions in the Waffen-SS were ordered in a single series up to 38th, regardless of type. Those tagged with nationalities were at least nominally recruited from those nationalities. Many of the higher-numbered units were small battle groups (Kampfgruppen), i.e. divisions in name only.

Also Panzer Division Kempf, a temporary unit of mixed Heer and Waffen-SS components.

== See also ==
- List of World War II military units of Germany
- List of German army groups in World War II
- List of German corps in World War II
- List of German brigades in World War II

== Notes ==
1. A shadow division was not a combat division, but rather a framework for rebuilding a decimated infantry division. Shadow divisions typically had a small divisional staff, just two weak infantry regiments, just one artillery detachment instead of a regiment, usually no supply arm, and so forth. A shadow division would be designated to rebuild a particular combat division before it was recalled from the front, becoming that division's "shadow" until the two divisions were merged. Not be confused with reserve divisions or replacement divisions.
