= 309th Division =

309th Division may refer to:

- 309th Infantry Division, Wehrmacht, Germany
- 309th Rifle Division, Soviet Union
- 309th Air Division, United States

== See also ==
- List of military divisions by number
