= 363rd Volksgrenadier Division =

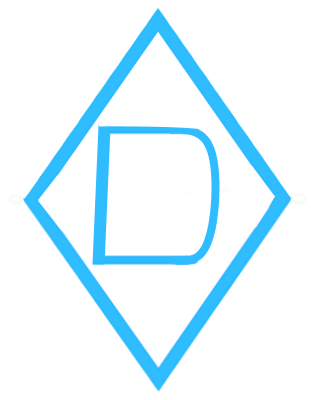
- 363. Infanterie Division Vehicle Insignia
- Active: 1944–45
- Disbanded: 1945
- Country: Nazi Germany
- Branch: Army
- Type: Infantry
- Size: Division
- Engagements: Operation Market Garden

Commanders
- Notable commanders: August Dettling

The 363rd Volksgrenadier Division (German: 363. Volksgrenadier-Division) was a volksgrenadier division of the German Army during the Second World War, active from 1944 to 1945.

The division was formed in September 1944 to replace the 363rd Infantry Division which was annihilated in the Falaise pocket, by redesignating the 566th Volksgrenadier Division, under the command of August Dettling. It contained the 957th, 958th and 959th Grenadier Regiments, and the 363rd Artillery Regiment.

The division fought in the Netherlands, suffering heavy casualties during the failed German offensive against the Nijmegen salient in early October 1944. After being refitted, the division fought around and along the Roer River before finally being destroyed in the Ruhr pocket in April 1945.
