= 393rd Infantry Division =

- German: 393. Infanterie-Division
- Active: 15 March 1940 – 1 August 1940
- Country: Nazi Germany
- Branch: Army (Wehrmacht)
- Type: Infantry
- Size: Division
- Garrison/HQ: Warsaw (German-occupied Poland)
- Engagements: World War II: Battle of France

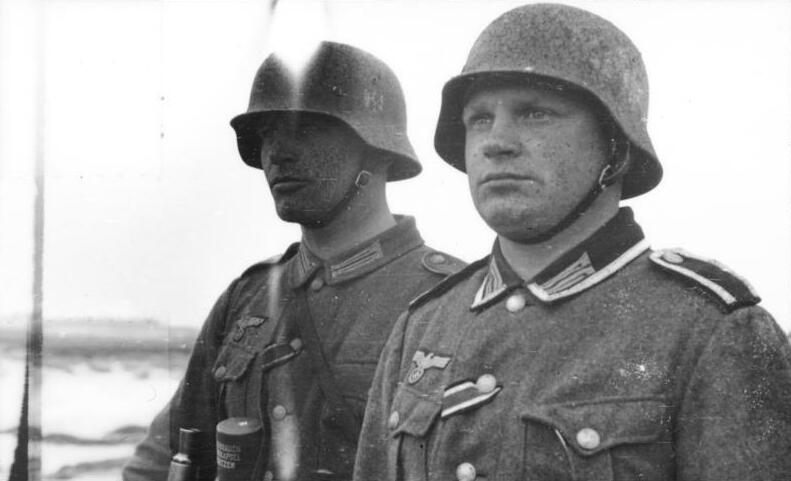
German infantry squad in winter

The 393rd Infantry Division (German: 393. Infanterie-Division) was an infantry division of the German army during World War II. It existed between March and August 1940.

== History ==
The 393rd Infantry Division was formed on 10 March 1940 as one of the Landesschützen divisions of the ninth wave of deployment. The division was initially headquartered at Warsaw in German-occupied Poland; its staff personnel was mainly drawn from the staff of the 423rd z.b.V. Division. The 393rd Infantry Division initially consisted of three infantry regiments (Infantry Regiment 659, Infantry Regiment 660, Infantry Regiment 661) as well as an artillery battery, a reconnaissance squadron and a signals company. The division's recruits were mainly drawn from older conscripts. The initial divisional commander was Theodor Freiherr von Wrede, who had already been the commander of the previous 423rd Division. Von Wrede was replaced by Karl von Oven on 16 May 1940.

From November 1939 to May 1940, it was placed under the supervision of the Higher Command XXXVI, along with the 218th and 372nd Infantry Divisions.

After the German victory in the Battle of France in June 1940, the divisions of the ninth wave were ordered from Poland back to Germany and formally dissolved on 1 August 1940; each of the three regiments of the 393rd Division left behind a guard battalion (also numbered 659, 660 and 661) for continued occupation duty. The rests of the regiments then went on to form two battalions each to guard prisoners of war. These six battalions became the Landesschützen Battalions 494 through 499. The three battalions that had been left behind in Poland were redesignated Landesschützen Battalions 972 through 974. The divisional staff was used to form the staff of the Oberfeldkommandantur 393 in Warsaw, which was to be used for various managerial tasks in the military occupation of that sector.

Some isolated German reports erroneously referred to the existence of a 393rd Infantry Division after 1940.
