= 155th Infantry Division (Wehrmacht) =

- 155. Infanterie-Division
- Divisional insignia
- Active: February – May 1945
- Country: Nazi Germany
- Branch: Army
- Type: Infantry
- Size: Division
- Engagements: Italian Campaign

The 155th Infantry Division (German: 155. Infanteriedivision) was a German Army infantry division in World War II.

== History ==
The 155th Infantry Division was raised some time before February 1945, when it was known to have been sent into Italy to reinforce the German and Italian armies, who were resisting the Allied advance during the Italian campaign.

== Commanders ==
- Generalmajor Georg Zwade (February 1945 – 8 May 1945)

== Operations Officers ==
- Major Quellhorst (11 February 1945 – 1945)
- Major Bernhard Diederichsen (20 March 1945 – 1 April 1945)
- Major Eberhard Völkel (1 April 1945 – 1945)

== See also ==
- Division (military), Military unit, List of German divisions in World War II
- Army, Wehrmacht
