= 395th Infantry Division =

The 395th Infantry Division (German: 395. Infanterie-Division), initially known as the 521st Infantry Division (German: 521. Infanterie-Division), was an infantry division of the German army during World War II. It existed as the 521st Division from November 1939 until March 1940 and as the 395th Division from March until August 1940.

== History ==
=== 521st Infantry Division ===
521st Infantry Division
- German: 521. Infanterie-Division
- Active: 1 November 1939 – 18 March 1940
- Country: Nazi Germany
- Branch: Army (Wehrmacht)
- Type: Infantry
- Size: Division
- Garrison/HQ: Allenstein
- Engagements: None

The 521st Infantry Division was formed on 1 November 1939 in East Prussia using personnel from the former Grenzschutz-Abschnitts-Kommando 15, formerly headquartered at Allenstein. It consisted of two regiments, the Frontier Guard Regiments 51 and 61, with three battalions each. In March 1940, the 521st Infantry Division was restructured into the 395th Infantry Division. The division was then formally dissolved on 18 March 1940. The division's initial commander was Major General Wolf Schede, who swapped commands with Major General Hans Stengel of the 209th Infantry Division on 10 January 1940. Stengel remained the divisional commander of the 521st (and subsequently 395th) Division until its dissolution.

=== 395th Infantry Division ===
395th Infantry Division
- German: 395. Infanterie-Division
- Active: 16 March 1940 – 22 July 1940
- Country: Nazi Germany
- Branch: Army (Wehrmacht)
- Type: Infantry
- Size: Division
- Garrison/HQ: Tilsit
- Engagements: None

The 395th Infantry Division was formed, as one of the Landesschützen Divisions of the ninth wave of deployment, on 16 March 1940. It was headquartered at Tilsit in East Prussia and initially consisted of three regiments, the Infantry Regiment 665, 674 and 675. Infantry Regiment 665 was assembled from two battalions of the former Frontier Guard Regiment 51 (I./51 and II./51) as well as from the Landesschützen Battalion X./I from Gumbinnen; Infantry Regiment 674 was assembled in Tilsit from the third battalions of both regiments of the 521st Division (III./51 and III./61); Infantry Regiment 675 was assembled in Memel from the staff of the Feld-Kommandantur 512 (formerly at Leipzig) as well as two battalions from the former Frontier Guard Regiment 61 (I./61 and II./61). Additionally, the 395th Infantry Division was equipped with a bicycle squadron and a signals company.

The division was on frontier guard duty in East Prussia, where it was supervised by Higher Command XXXII. The divisional commander was Major General Hans Stengel, who had already commanded the 521st Division.

On 12 June 1940, the division was equipped with its own artillery regiment (Artillery Regiment 395) with a staff and with two detachments (equipped with captured Polish artillery pieces), but the ongoing Battle of France soon resulted in a German victory that made the divisions of the ninth wave in occupied Poland superfluous. On 22 July 1940, the 395th Infantry Division was formally dissolved. Throughout the division's history, the formation had never operated outside of East Prussia and had never seen combat.

From the former 395th Division's personnel, seven Home Guard Battalions (German: Heimat-Wach-Bataillone) were formed to guard Germany's prisoners of war. The battalions III./665 and III./674 became the Landesschützen Battalions 237 and 238 on 1 January 1941. The battalions II./665 and I./674 were sent to Wehrkreis II and made available for the formation of the 332nd Infantry Division, where they became III./678 and III./677. Similarly, the battalions I./675 and II./675 were sent to Wehrkreis III to become part of the newly assembled 333rd Infantry Division. The battalion III./675 was dissolved without replacement. The divisional staff was carried over into the Oberfeldkommandantur 395, which was later used in Thessaloniki in German-occupied Greece.
