= 16th Volksgrenadier Division =

- Active: 1944–1945
- Disbanded: 1945
- Country: Nazi Germany
- Allegiance: Army
- Type: Volksgrenadier
- Size: Division

The 16th Volksgrenadier Division (16. Volksgrenadier-Division; 16. VGD) was a volksgrenadier division of the German Army (Heer) during the Second World War, active from October 1944 to May 1945.

== History ==
The 16th Volksgrenadier Division was established on 9 October 1944 from the remnants of the 16th Infantry Division, the 158th Reserve Division and the 16th Luftwaffe Field Division in the Vosges in France. She took part in the defensive battles between Langres and Epinal.

On 2 February 1945, the division was in a defensive position in the area of Turckheim, but on 8 February was ordered to pull back across the Rhine over the bridge in Neuchatel to help defend the Westwall. On 15 March 1945, the expected attack by the French First Army and US VI Corps started and after resisting for one day the division was forced to pull back.
The last remnants of the division capitulated on 5 May 1945 in the Kufstein area.

== Commanders ==
- Generalleutnant Ernst Häckel (9 October 1944)
- Oberst Eberhard Zorn (15 November 1944)
- Generalmajor Alexander Möckel (29 December 1944), KIA
- Generalleutnant Schmidt (24 March 1945)
- Oberst Otto Kestner (6 April 1945)

== Sources ==
- 16. Volksgrenadierdivision in Lexikon der Wehrmacht
