= 560th Volksgrenadier Division =

560th Grenadier Division 560th Volksgrenadier Division
- Active: 1944-1945
- Disbanded: 1945
- Country: Nazi Germany
- Branch: Army
- Type: Infantry
- Size: Division

Commanders
- Notable commanders: Erich Hofmann; Rudolf Bader

The 560th Volksgrenadier Division was a volksgrenadier division of the German Army during the Second World War, active from 1944 to 1945.

The division was formed on 10 August 1944 in Norway, by redesignating the 560th Grenadier Division, itself created on 1 August 1944 under the command of Erich Hofmann. It contained the 1128th, 1129rd and 1130th Grenadier Regiments, and the 1560th Artillery Regiment.

After redeploying to Denmark and then to the Western Front, the division fought in the Battle of the Bulge under the command of Rudolf Bader before retreating through Germany and being trapped in the Ruhr pocket, where it was destroyed in April 1945.
