= 544th Volksgrenadier Division =

- German: 544. Volksgrenadier-Division
- Active: 10 July 1944 – 9 May 1945
- Country: Nazi Germany
- Branch: Heer
- Type: Volksgrenadier (Infantry)
- Size: Division
- Engagements: World War II

Commanders
- Commander: Werner Ehrig

The 544th Volksgrenadier Division (German: 544. Volksgrenadier-Division) was a Volksgrenadier-type infantry division of the German Wehrmacht during World War II. It was active from July 1944 to May 1945. In the first two months of service, the division was designated 544th Grenadier Division (German: 544. Grenadier-Division).

== Operational history ==
The division, initially designated 544th Grenadier Division, was formed on 10 July 1944 as part of the 29th wave of deployment. The 29th wave had been rapidly mobilized in the wake of the Allied Normandy landings and its divisions (numbered 541 through 553 and 558 through 562) had initially been planned to be designated blocking divisions (German: Sperr-Divisionen), a name that was dropped for psychological reasons in favor of grenadier divisions.

The 544th Grenadier Division was assembled in the Grafenwöhr Training Area from the Infantry Division Grafenwöhr, one of the shadow divisions of the 28th wave which had been in the process of deployment in Grafenwöhr since 4 July 1944. Initially, the 544th Grenadier Division consisted of the Grenadier Regiments 1082 through 1084 with two battalions each (for a total of six battalions), as well as the Artillery Regiment 1544 with four batteries. Additionally, the division included the Fusilier Company 544. The divisional commander was Werner Ehrig, who had previously served as chief of operations of 22nd Infantry Division.

The division was initially assigned to XI SS Panzer Corps under the 17th Army of Army Group North Ukraine. On 14 September 1944, the remnants of 1136th Grenadier Brigade were initially assigned to the 544th division, but were then instead used to form Division Fusilier Battalion 545.

On 16 September 1944, the Grenadier Divisions of the 29th wave were ordered to be reorganized into Volksgrenadier Divisions on the model of the 32nd wave. The resulting redesignations were carried out on 9 October 1944, resulting in the redesignation of 544th Grenadier Division into 544th Volksgrenadier Division.

During its time as a Volksgrenadier Division, the formation served under LIX Army Corps, which in turn assigned to 17th Army of Army Group A from October 1944 to January 1945 in German-occupied Poland and then to the 1st Panzer Army of Army Group Centre from February to May 1945, first in Upper Silesia and eventually in Bohemia.

On 1 January 1945, the 544th Volksgrenadier Division (then part of 17th Army of Army Group A) had a strength of 9,363 men.

In Bohemia, the divisional personnel became PoWs of the Red Army in May 1945.
