= 379th Infantry Division =

- German: 379. Infanterie-Division
- Active: 15 March 1940 – 15 August 1940
- Country: Nazi Germany
- Branch: Army (Wehrmacht)
- Type: Infantry
- Size: Division
- Garrison/HQ: Lublin, German-occupied Poland

The 379th Infantry Division (German: 379. Infanterie-Division) was an infantry division of the German army during World War II. It existed between March and August 1940.

== History ==
The 379th Infantry Division was formed as one of the Landesschützen divisions of the ninth Aufstellungswelle on 15 March 1940 in Lublin (German-occupied Poland). Its staff was drawn from the personnel of the Divisional Staff z.b.V. 424, which had been assembled on 24 October 1939 in Wehrkreis XIII. Initially, the 379th Infantry Division consisted of three infantry regiments, one artillery battery, one bicycle squadron and a signals company. The infantry regiments were numbered 653, 654 and 655. The initial commander of the 379th Infantry Division was Ludwig Müller (not to be confused with another Wehrmacht general by the same name). The personnel of the division was mainly drawn from older conscripts that had been called up during general mobilization in September 1939.

Between November 1939 and May 1940, the 379th Infantry Division served as part of Grenzschutzabschnittskommando Mitte, the frontier guards in the central border sector of German-occupied Poland towards the Soviet Union.

Having served in German-occupied Poland, the division was prepared after the stunning German victory over France in June 1940 for immediate dissolution, as military priorities no longer required the various Landesschützen divisions. Autonomous home guard battalions (German: Heimat-Wach-Bataillone) were formed from the various battalions of the three regiments of the 379th Infantry Division. These home guard battalions received designations as Landesschützen battalions 617, 619 through 624 and 636 through 638.

The division itself was formally dissolved on 15 August 1940 at Friedberg and Butzbach in Wehrkreis IX; the divisional staff went on to form the Oberfeldkommandantur 379, again headquartered in Lublin. The final divisional commander had been Wilhelm von Altrock, who had taken command from his predecessor Müller on 28 May 1940.
