= 14th Landwehr Division (German Empire) =

- 14. Landwehr-Division
- Active: World War I
- Countries: German Empire
- Allegiance: Imperial German Army

The 14th Landwehr Division (14. Landwehr-Division) was a unit of the Imperial German Army in World War I.
