= 309th Infantry Division =

- 309. Infanterie-Division
- Active: 1 February 1945 – 29 April 1945
- Country: Nazi Germany
- Branch: Heer (Wehrmacht)
- Size: Division
- Engagements: World War II

Commanders
- Commander: Heinrich Voigtsberger

Infantry Division 309, also known as the 309th Infantry Division, Infantry Division "Berlin", and Infantry Division "Greater Berlin", was an infantry division of the German Wehrmacht during World War II.

== History ==
Infantry Division "Berlin" was formed on 1 February 1945 in Döberitz as an emergency formation in Wehrkreis III. It was assembled from two regiments of the 166th Infantry Division, hitherto in occupied Denmark. While the division received the ordinal number 309, it was usually just referred to as Infantry Division "Berlin" and, from April 1945, as Infantry Division "Greater Berlin". The division's only commander was Heinrich Voigtsberger, who initially held the rank of Oberst (colonel) and was promoted to Generalmajor on 1 April 1945.

After service in the Küstrin area, the Infantry Division "Berlin" was destroyed in the Halbe cauldron, around 29 April 1945.

== Organization ==
=== Superior formations ===
Throughout its entire activity, the Infantry Division "Berlin" was part of CI Army Corps, which was in turn part of the 9th Army under Army Group Vistula.

=== Subordinate formations ===
The intended strength of Infantry Division "Berlin" at the point of formation was as follows:

- Guard Regiment "Greater Germany" (two battalions).
- Grenadier Regiment 652 (two battalions). Formed from Reserve Grenadier Regiment 86 (previously 166th Infantry Division).
- Grenadier Regiment 653 (two battalions). Formed from Reserve Grenadier Regiment 6 (previously 166th Infantry Division).
- Fusilier Battalion 309. (Note: Added to the division in March, formed from Walküreeinheit 1/3/VII of Wehrkreis VII.)
- Artillery Regiment 309 (one detachment). (Note: 2nd and 3rd detachments were intended to be formed from Luftwaffe materiel, but never saw deployment.)
- Division Units 309. (Note: The Panzerjäger detachment of Division 309 became Panzerjäger Detachment 200 of the 21st Panzer Division.)
