= 548th Volksgrenadier Division =

WWII German infantry division

The 548th Grenadier Division was a German Infantry Division during World War II.

== History ==
The division was formed in Lithuania on 11 July 1944 and fought on the Eastern Front as part of the XII SS Corps.

On 9 October 1944, the division was renamed the 548th Volksgrenadier Division.

The division fought in the Battle of Memel, in East Prussia and was destroyed during the Samland offensive in the Pillau–Königsberg area in February/March 1945.

== Commanders ==
- Generalmajor Erich Sudau (11 July 1944 – 9 April 1945), killed in the Battle of Königsberg.

== Source ==
- Lexikon der Wehrmacht
- Axis History
