= 160th Infantry Division (Wehrmacht) =

Division No. 160 160th Reserve Division 160th Infantry Division
- Division Nr. 160; 160. Reserve-Division; 160. Infanterie-Division
- Active: 1939–1945
- Country: Nazi Germany
- Branch: Army
- Type: Infantry
- Garrison/HQ: Holstead (1943–1945)

Commanders
- Notable commanders: Otto Schünemann

The 160th Infantry Division (German: 160. Infanterie-Division) was an infantry division of the German Heer during World War II. The unit, at times designated Commander of Reserve Troops X (German: Kommandeur der Ersatztruppen X), Commander of Reserve Troops X/I (German: Kommandeur der Ersatztruppen X/I), 160th Division (German: 160. Division), Division No. 160 (German: Division Nr. 160), and 160th Reserve Division (German: 160. Reserve-Division), was active between 1939 and 1945.

== History ==
=== Commander of Reserve Troops X ===
As part of the German general mobilization on 26 August 1939, several staffs were activated to supervise the reserve units in each of the Wehrkreis military districts. These staffs were numbered with the Roman numerals that were assigned to their respective military districts. The Commander of Reserve Troops X was formed in the capital city of Wehrkreis X, Hamburg. The initial commander of the command staff was Otto Schünemann.

=== Commander of Reserve Troops X/I ===
The unit was redesignated Commander of Reserve Troops X/I on 25 October 1939.

=== 160th Division ===
The Commander of Reserve Troops X/I was redesignated 160th Division on 8 November 1939.

=== Division No. 160 ===
The 160th Division became the Division No. 160 on 12 December 1939.

In January 1940, the Division No. 160 consisted of the following formations:

- Infantry Reserve Regiment (motorized) 20, Hamburg.
- Infantry Reserve Regiment 30, Lübeck.
- Infantry Reserve Regiment 58, Schleswig.
- Infantry Reserve Regiment 225, Hamburg-Rahlstedt.
- Artillery Reserve Regiment 20, Rendsburg.
- Pioneer Reserve Battalion 20, Hamburg-Harburg
- Pioneer Reserve Battalion 30, Lübeck.
- Intelligence Reserve Detachment 20, Hamburg-Horn.
- Vehicle Reserve Detachment 10, Neumünster.
- Kraftfahr Reserve Detachment 10, Hamburg-Alsterdorf.
- Construction Reserve Battalion 10, Hamburg-Harburg.

In June 1940, the Division No. 160 was deployed to occupied Denmark to replace the 170th Infantry Division and was put under the supervision under the commander of the German occupation forces in Denmark. The division's previous tasks at the homefront were taken over by Division No. 190. In occupied Denmark, the military installations were insufficient to properly accommodate all of the division's forces. In October 1940, the division, now headquartered at Viborg, only contained a single remaining regiment, the Infantry Reserve Regiment 58 (Fredericia), as well as a recovery unit for wounded soldiers, at Flensburg. As a result, the division consisted of the following formations in October 1940:

- Division No. 160 Headquarters, Viborg.
- Infantry Reserve Regiment 58, Fredericia.
- Recovery Battalion 160, Flensburg.

In 1941, Division No. 160 was moved from Viborg to Copenhagen and the 58th Regiment from Fredericia to Ringsted. In summer of 1941, the division was strengthened with the Infantry Reserve Regiment 225, now at Odense, as well as the Artillery Reserve Detachment 58 at Hövelte. As a result, Division No. 160 consisted of the following formations on 1 December 1941:

- Division No. 160 Headquarters, Copenhagen.
- Infantry Reserve Regiment 58, Ringsted.
- Infantry Reserve Regiment 225, Odense.
- Recovery Battalion 160, Flensburg.
- Artillery Reserve Detachment 58, Hövelte.

On 1 May 1942, Schünemann was replaced as divisional commander by Horst von Uckermann. On 1 October 1942, the Replacement Army was reorganized and several reserve units were deployed from occupied Denmark to Germany, where they once again joined the Division No. 190 in Wehrkreis X. Because of the reorganization, Division No. 160 gave up its replacement formations and was henceforth dedicated specifically to training tasks.

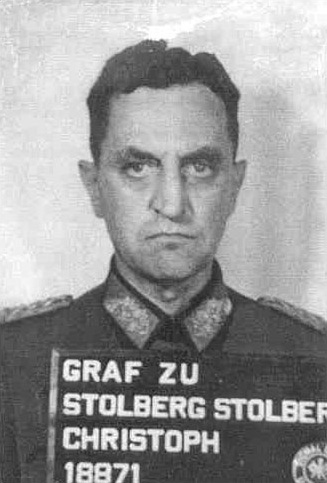
Christoph Graf zu Stolberg-Stolberg, divisional commander of Division No. 160 between 1 July 1943 and 1 August 1943. In American captivity in 1945.

On 1 July 1943, Uckermann was replaced as divisional commander by Christoph Graf zu Stolberg-Stolberg, who was in turn again replaced by Uckermann on 1 August 1943.

=== 160th Reserve Division ===
On 26 October 1943, an order by the Allgemeines Heeresamt of the Wehrmacht gave instruction for the reorganization of several military formations, including Division No. 160. The division became the 160th Reserve Division on 7 November 1943 and was subsequently deployed to Holsted, where the division command served as Defense Staff Jutland-South (German: Vertedigungsstab Jütland-Süd). In December 1943, the division consisted of the following formations:

- 160th Reserve Division Headquarters, Holsted.
- Reserve Grenadier Regiment 58, Øster Vrøgum.
- Reserve Grenadier Regiment 225, Esbjerg.
- Reserve Grenadier Regiment 290, Nørre Nebel Sogn.
- Reserve Artillery Regiment 20, Varde.
- Auxiliary Flak Artillery Replacement and Training Detachment 280, Oksbøl.

These formations were joined in 1944 by the Reserve Pioneer Battalion 30 and the Supply Unit 1060. On 10 July 1944, Uckermann was replaced as divisional commander by Friedrich Hofmann, the division's final commander.

=== 160th Infantry Division ===
Within weeks of the end of World War II, the 160th Reserve Division became the 160th Infantry Division on 9 March 1945. The three reserve regiments that had formed the 160th Reserve Divisions became full Grenadier Regiments, numbered 657 through 659. The division's composition in March 1945 was as follows:

- Grenadier Regiment 657 (formerly Reserve Grenadier Regiment 58).
- Grenadier Regiment 658 (formerly Reserve Grenadier Regiment 225).
- Grenadier Regiment 659 (formerly Reserve Grenadier Regiment 290).
- Artillery Regiment 1060 (formerly Reserve Artillery Regiment 20).
- Division Fusilier Company 160.
- Pioneer Battalion 1060 ((possibly) formerly Volkssturm Battalion 412).

The 160th Infantry Division did not see combat until German surrender in early May 1945. The division remained in Denmark until the end of the war.

== Superior formations ==
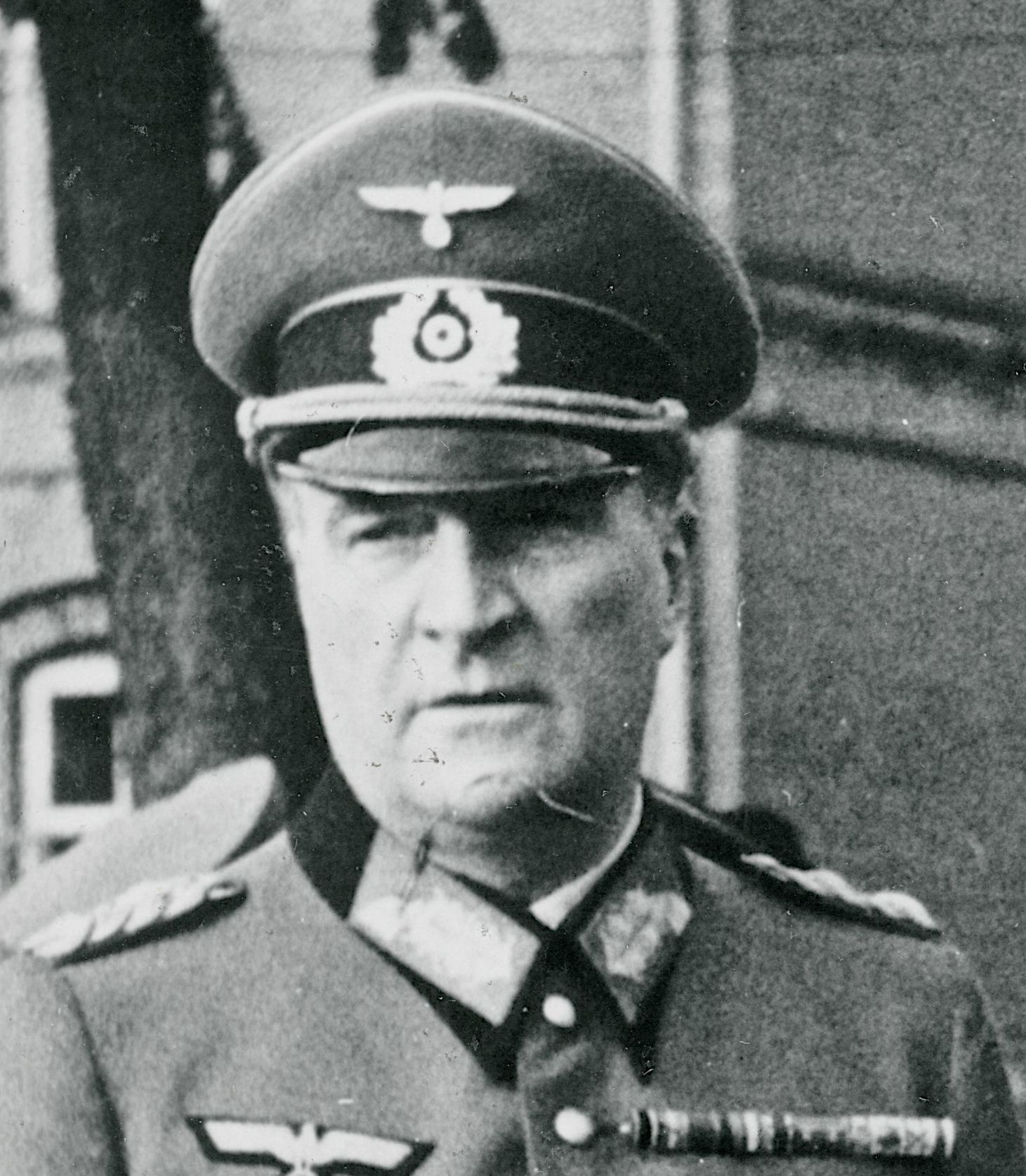
Hermann von Hanneken, commander of Wehrmacht occupation forces in Denmark between 1942 and 1945, in 1942

The 160th Division in its various iterations was supervised by the following superior commands, each of which was presided over by Hermann von Hanneken:

- December 1943: Commander of the German troops in Denmark.
- June 1944 to April 1945: Wehrmacht Commander Denmark.

== Noteworthy individuals ==
- Otto Schünemann, divisional commander starting on 26 August 1939.
- Horst von Uckermann, divisional commander starting on 1 May 1942 and again starting on 1 August 1943.
- Christoph Graf zu Stolberg-Stolberg, divisional commander starting on 1 July 1943.
- Friedrich Hofmann, divisional commander starting on 10 July 1944.
