= Infantry Division Hamburg =

German military unit in world war II

The Infantry Division Hamburg (German: Infanterie-Division Hamburg) was an infantry division of the German Heer during World War II. It was assigned the ordinal number 324, but was no longer known as the 324th Infantry Division after 10 March 1945. The division existed only in early March 1945.

== History ==
Infantry Division Hamburg was formed as an emergency formation on 4 March 1945 in Wehrkreis X. It initially consisted of the Grenadier Regiments 588 and 589 (formerly Grenadier Regiment Hamburg 1 and Grenadier Regiment Hamburg 2, respectively), consisting of two battalions each, as well as the Division Fusilier Battalion 324, the Artillery Regiment 324 (two artillery detachment), and the Division Units 324. The division's only commander during its history was Walter Steinmüller.

Deployment was completed by 8 March 1945, and the division was rushed into the Wesel sector. Upon arrival in the region on 10 March, the fighting formations of the division were immediately folded into local units, whereas the staff and signals detachment remained nominally independent. The staff was subsequently renamed Division z.b.V. 618. In April 1945, the staff served under LXIII Army Corps, Army Detachment Lüttwitz, Army Group B.

All formations of Infantry Division Hamburg were destroyed in the Ruhr Pocket.
