= Infantry Division Kurland =

German military unit during World War II

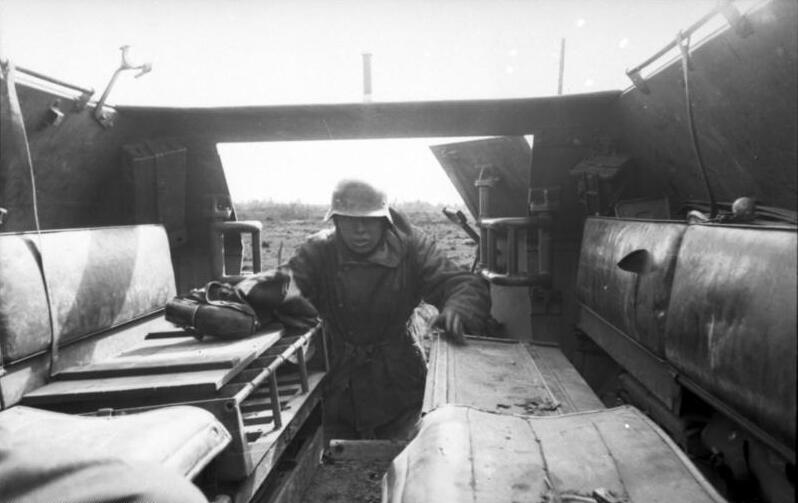

The Infantry Division Courland (German: Infanterie-Division Kurland) was an infantry division of the German army during World War II.

The division was initially known under various different names, subsequently as 388th Field Training Division (388. Feldausbildungs-Division), Field Training Division North (Feldausbildungs-Division Nord) and Field Training Division Courland (Feldausbildungs-Division Kurland).

== History ==
=== 388th Field Training Division ===
388th Field Training Division
- 388. Feldausbildungs-Division
- Active: 9 September 1942 – 19 May 1944
- Country: Nazi Germany
- Branch: Heer ( Wehrmacht)
- Type: Infantry

Commanders
- Notable commanders: Johann Pflugbeil

The 388th Field Training Division (388. Feldausbildungs-Division) was formed on 9 September 1942 with two regiments (numbered 639 and 640) to serve as a training formation for the recruits of Army Group North on the Eastern Front; the division's personnel was drawn from Wehrkreis I for the staff, from Wehrkreis VIII for Infantry Training Regiment 639 and from Wehrkreis II for Infantry Training Regiment 640. The division was formed without artillery or divisional support units. Each of the two regiments contained three battalions, of which each battalion contained three companies each with six light machine guns and one 50mm mortar. Two of the battalions were additionally equipped with a company of nine heavy machine guns and three 80mm mortars each, whereas the respective third battalion of both regiments contained a pioneer platoon (with two light machine guns), a signals platoons, an infantry support sections (with two 75mm guns) and a Panzerjäger section (with two 37mm anti-tank guns and one light machine gun).

On 3 December 1943, orders were issued to expand the division in the timeframe until 1 April 1944 with four regiments (that were also to include newly formed Panzerjäger formations). However, the expansion was never fully implemented and three battalions instead passed on to other formations (two battalions to 61st Infantry Division, one battalion to 126th Infantry Division). On 15 March 1944, the 388th Field Training Division received the Grenadier Field Training Battalion 391 from the 391st Field Training Division. The 388th Field Training Division was redesignated "Field Training Division North" on 19 May 1944.

Throughout the division's history (as well as during the history of its subsequent redesignations), it was commanded by Johann Pflugbeil, whose advanced age and limited abilities as a field commander (in the estimation of German higher ups) had already led to several previous appointments to less prestigious and combat-ready formations, such as Landwehr Command Breslau or the 221st Security Division (the latter of which became notable through its numerous war crimes).

=== Field Training Division North ===
Created on 19 May 1944 from the former 388th Field Training Division, the Field Training Division North continued to field the two previous regiments (now named Grenadier Training Regiment 639 and 640) and did not field any additional artillery or divisional support units. On 25 January 1945, in response to the fact that Army Group North had gotten trapped in the Courland Pocket, Army Group North was renamed "Army Group Courland", thus rendering the name of the division out of date. On 2 February 1945, it was renamed "Field Training Division Courland".

=== Field Training Division Courland ===
Infantry Division Courland
- Infanterie-Division Kurland
- Active: 2 February 1945 – May 1945
- Country: Nazi Germany
- Branch: Heer ( Wehrmacht)
- Type: Infantry

Commanders
- Notable commanders: Johann Pflugbeil

The Field Training Division Courland, created on 2 February 1945 through the redesignation of Field Training Division North, was itself soon renamed to become Infantry Division Courland on 15 February 1945.

=== Infantry Division Courland ===
Infantry Division Courland was created when Field Training Courland was renamed on 15 February 1945. The division contained the same two regiments as before: Grenadier Field Training Regiment 639 and Grenadier Field Training Regiment 640. There was still no artillery or divisional support provided to the divisions. It remained in the Courland Pocket, along with the various forces of 16th Army and 18th Army. At the end of the war, the division was still commanded by Pflugbeil.
