= Division z.b.V. 136 =

The 136th Divisional Staff for Special Assignment (German: Divisionsstab zur besonderen Verwendung 136) was a German military unit of the Wehrmacht during World War II.

== Organization ==
The divisional staff headquarters was established on April 25, 1944, in German-occupied Antwerp. It was formed from the 721st Command Staff Osttruppen (Eastern Troops). It was subordinated to the 15th Army, as part of the command area of the Oberbefehlshaber West. It initially consisted of 18 companies of soldiers suffering from digestive disorders and stomach ailments. These men required special diets, and were normally considered unfit for military service. On May 13, 1944, Generalmajor Christoph Clemens Johannes Baptista Hubertus Maria Graf zu Stolberg-Stolberg officially became the commander of the new divisional staff. He set up his headquarters in bunkers near the Antwerp Stadspark (city park).

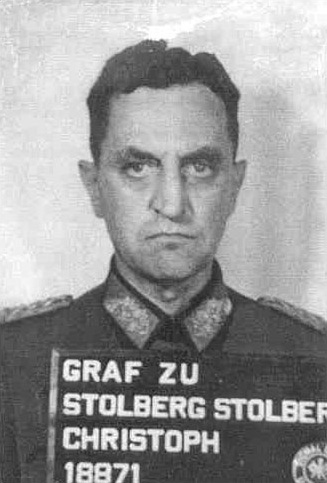
Generalmajor Christoph Graf zu Stolberg-Stolberg

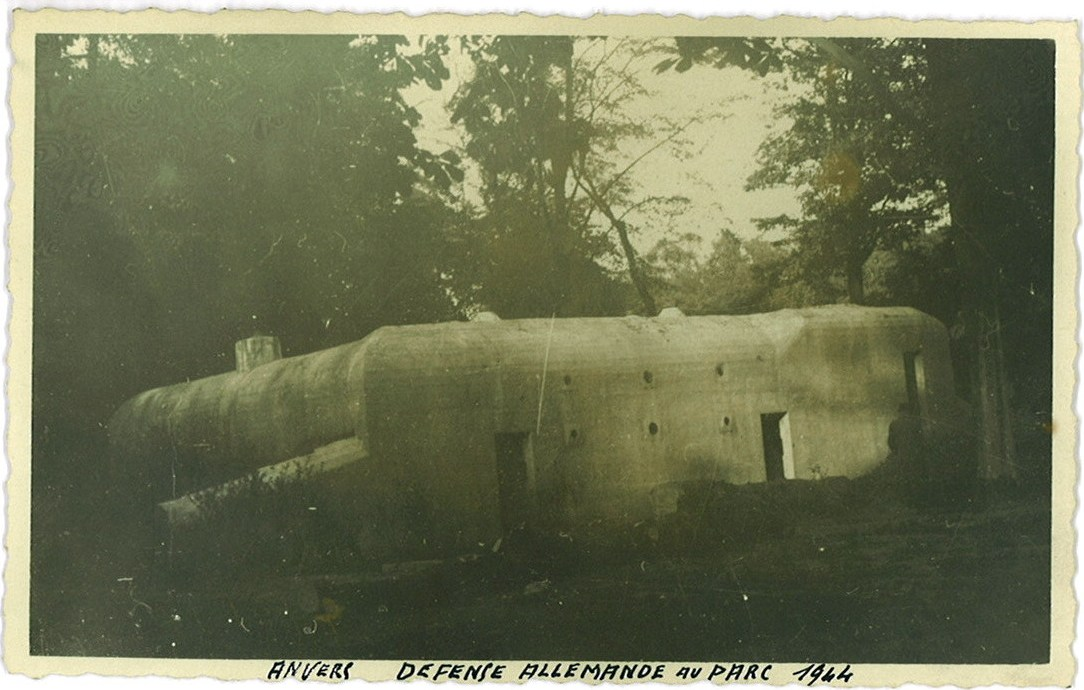
German bunkers in the Antwerp city park

The following military units, numbering a total of approximately 16,000 soldiers, were subordinated to the divisional staff headquarters:

- 600th Eastern Battalion (Cossacks), which was to defend the bridges over the Rupel River, south of Antwerp
- (M)I/136 "Magen"(Stomach) Battalion (composed of soldiers with stomach health problems)
- (M)II/136 "Magen"(Stomach) Battalion (composed of soldiers with stomach health problems)
- the first and second battalions of the 16th Security Regiment, attached for operational control only
- Flemish Guard Battalion,
- Pionierlandungsbataillon 86
- subunits of the 520th Field Command, administrative center of the occupation of Antwerp
- subunits of the Maria-ter-Heide Military Training Area Command
- subunits of the Luftwaffe and Kriegsmarine

On May 28, the disbanded Coastal Defense Detachment “Antwerpen” was incorporated into the 136th Divisional Staff

== Service History ==
On September 4–5, 1944, the 136th Divisional Staff defended Antwerp against an attack by the British 11th Armored Division. The 136th was tasked with destroying Antwerp’s harbor facilities to prevent their capture by the British. An Allied newsreel about the battle mentions that German snipers were stationed in the port facilities. The British troops, with assistance from Belgian resistance groups, including the White Brigade, prevented the planned destruction of the port and tunnels, even though the demolition charges had already been placed. The ventilation of the pedestrian tunnel and the floating bridge at Steen Castle were destroyed, however. When the Allied forces (4th King's Shropshire Light Infantry and elements of 2nd Fife and Forfar Yeomanry) entered the city of Antwerp around 14:00 hours on Sep 4th 1944, the city park remained a difficult defensive position to overcome. Some Belgian resistance fighters of the National Royalist Movement participated in the battle for the park. During the combat in the city, Stolberg remained in contact with the German LXXXVIII Armee-Korps (88th Army Corps). Around 15:30 hours, he had a telephone conversation with General der Infanterie Reinhard, the commander of 88th Army Corps, who instructed him to hold out as long as possible. Stolberg described the situation as critical. The few PaK anti-tank guns at his disposal had been lost, and street fighting was widespread.

The dire tactical situation made holding out impossible, and Stolberg decided to risk a breakout after nightfall. However, this plan never materialized. The Cossacks of the 600th Eastern Battalion guarding Stolberg’s headquarters surrendered when British tanks and infantry entered the city park. A subsequent German counterattack failed, and Stolberg surrendered along with his divisional staff shortly after midnight. Stolberg was taken as a prisoner to the commander of the British 159th Infantry Brigade, Brigadier John Churcher. Captured German soldiers were held in the cages of the Antwerp Zoo after the battle. Some of the remnants of the 136th fled the city and evaded capture, including some Cossacks of the 600th Eastern Battalion, who were later reorganized in Germany to form the 600th Russian Battalion. Divisionsstab z.b.V. 136, although de facto ceasing to exist when Antwerp fell, was not officially disbanded until October 30, 1944.

== Gallery ==
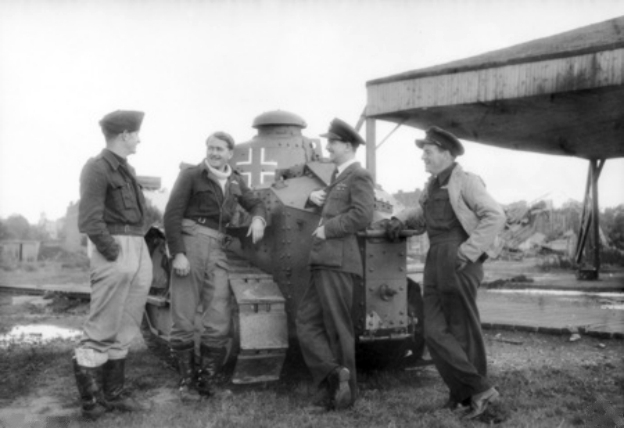
Australian airmen pose with a German FT-17 tank at the Antwerp airfield. These obsolete French tanks were captured by the Germans in 1940 and often used by the Luftwaffe for airfield security.

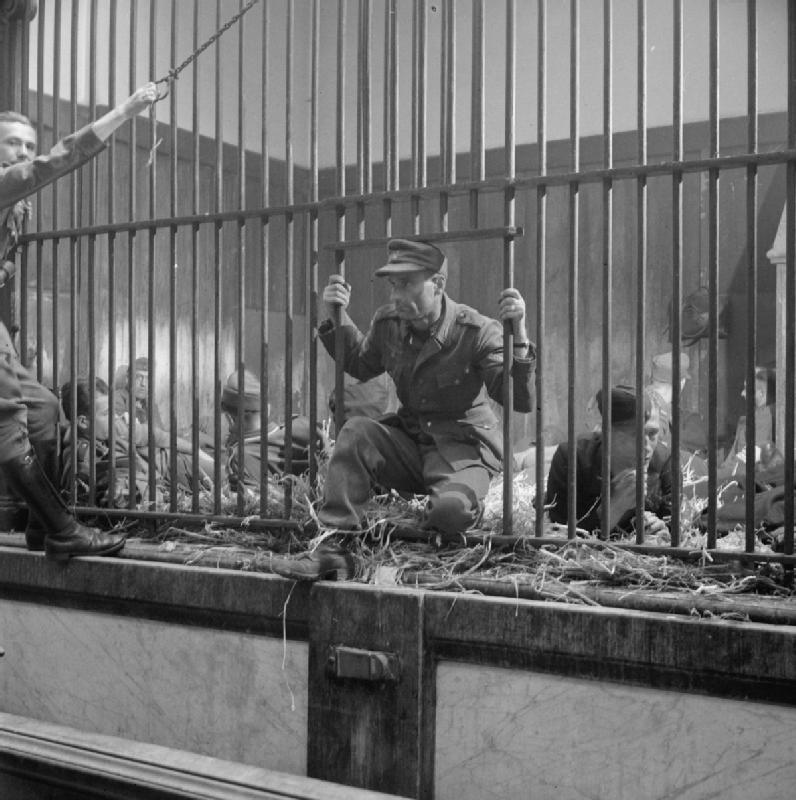
These German troops of the Division z.b.V. 136 were held in the Antwerp zoo’s lion cage after the battle.

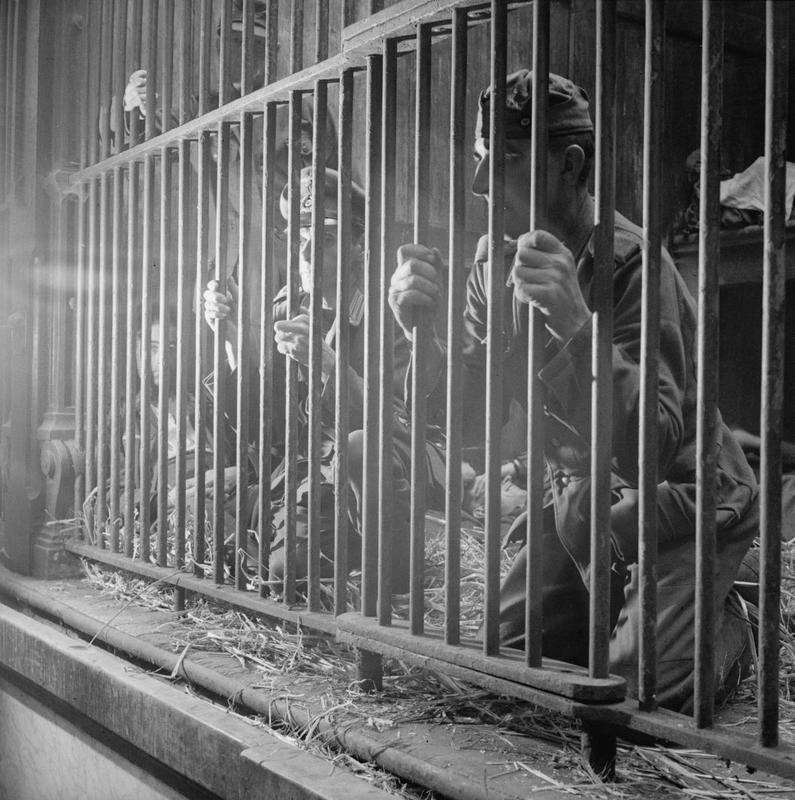
Another shot of the German prisoners in the lion cage.

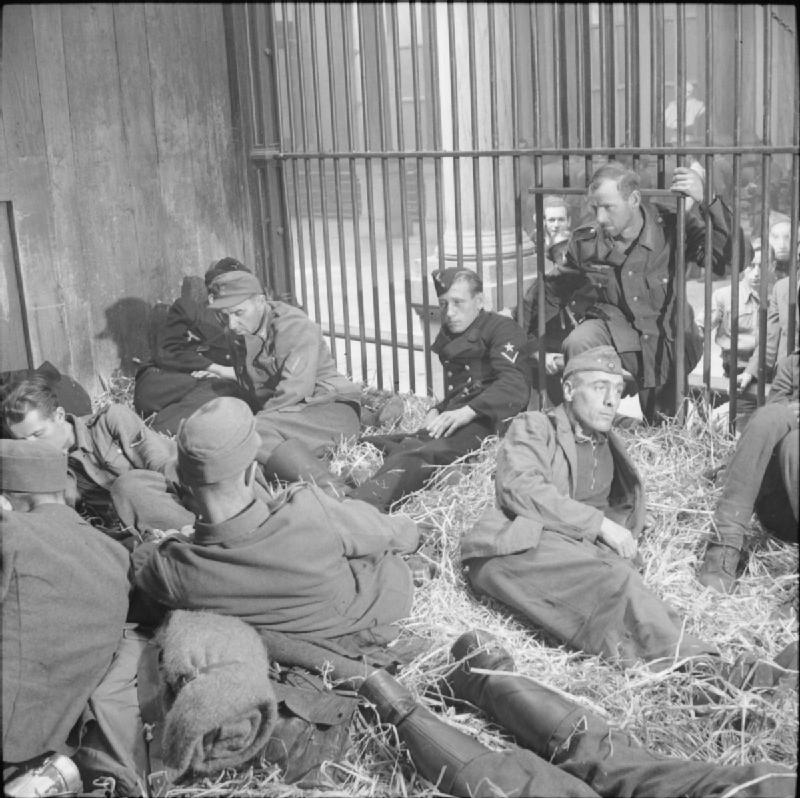
More prisoners from the division in a lion cage. Note the mixture of Heer and Kriegsmarine uniforms.

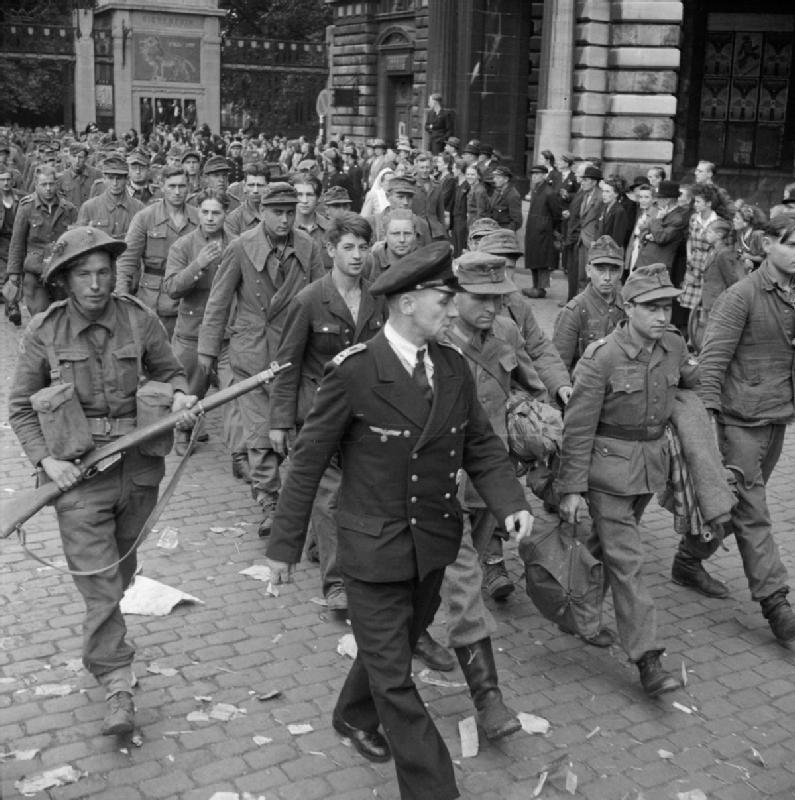
German prisoners of the division being paraded through the Antwerp streets by British troops. Note the officer in blue Kriegsmarine uniform at the front.

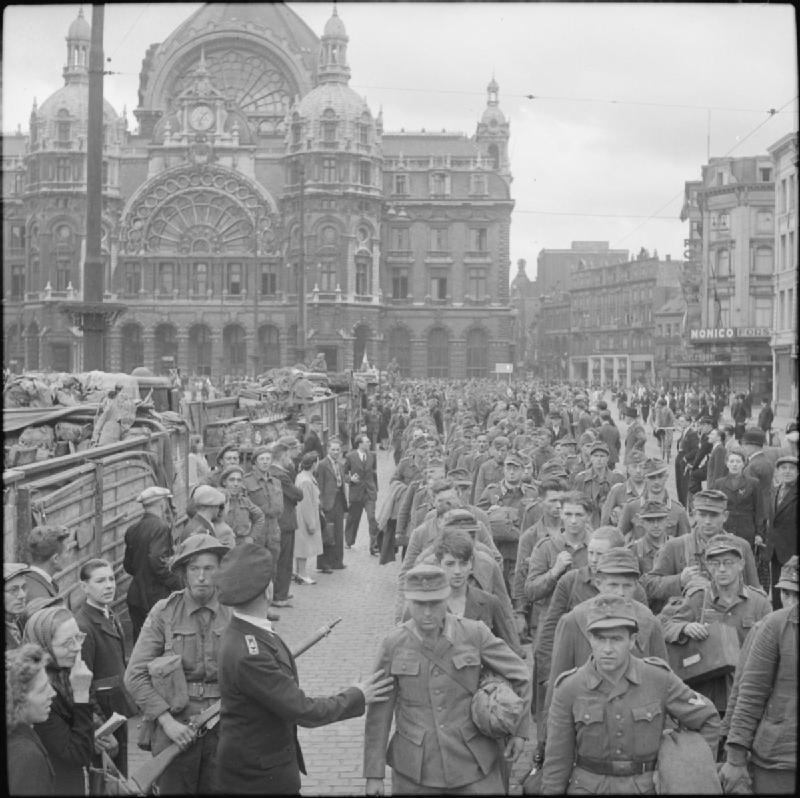
The same group of prisoners from a different angle.

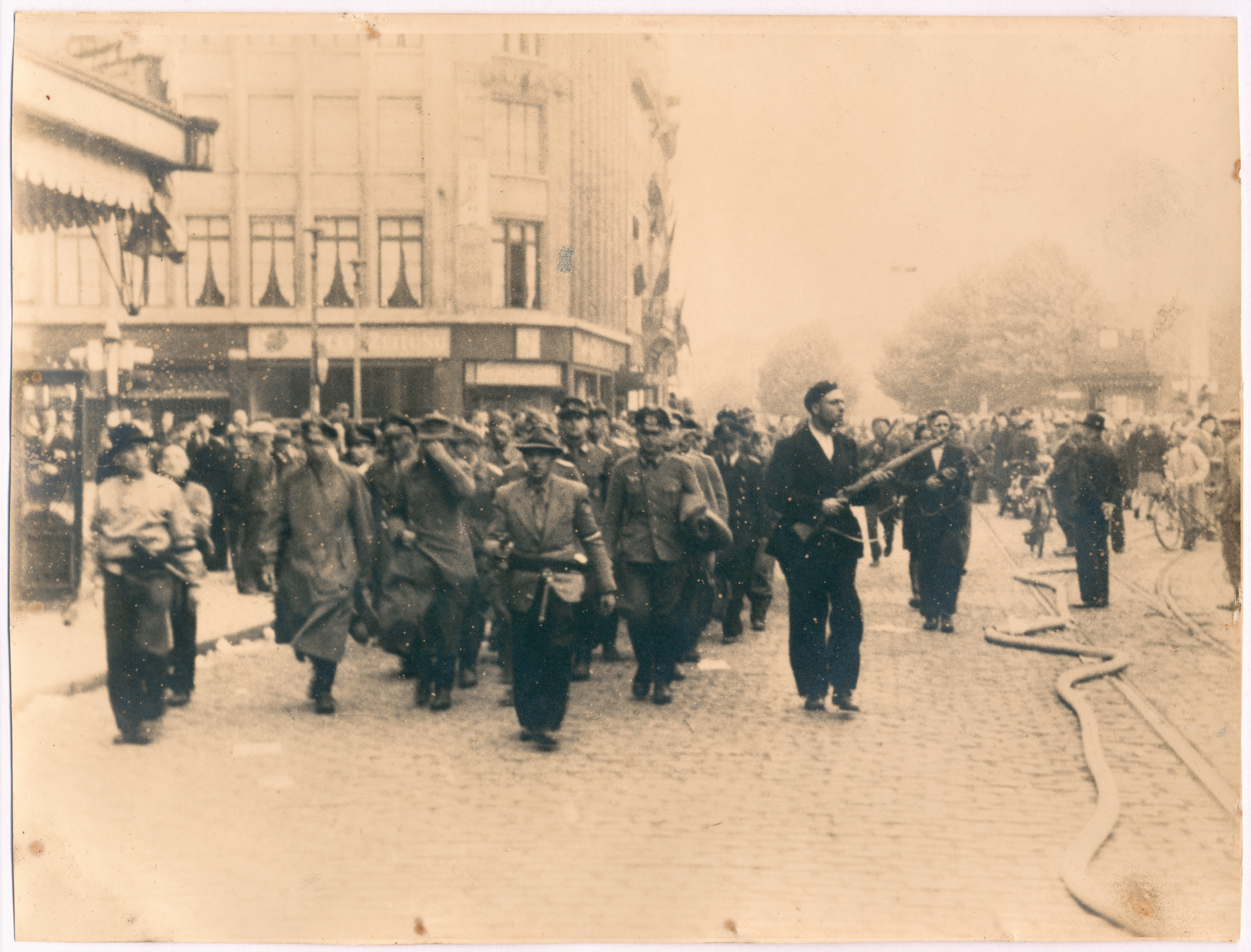
More prisoners from the division. Note that here they are being guarded by Belgian resistance fighters.

== Sources ==
- Georg Tessin, Verbände und Truppen der Deutschen Wehrmacht und Waffen SS im Zweiten Weltkrieg 1939-1945, 1973-1980
- “History of the 136th Special Duties Division Headquarters," Axis History, archived March 6, 2013, archive.ph.
- Leo Niehorster, "Divisionsstab zbV 136, German Army, 06.06.1944," accessed via Niehorster.org.
- Peter Taghon - Belgie 1944: De bevrijding (Lannoo, Tielt, 1993)
- City of Antwerp. 2026. "The End of the War: The Liberation of Antwerp and Its Port." Antwerpen Herdenkt.
- Weinberg, Gerhard. A World at Arms, Cambridge: Cambridge University Press, 2005, p. 700.
- Britain against Germany- A record in Pictures (British Information Services, New York, 1945)
