= 188th Mountain Division =

188th Reserve Mountain Division
- 188. Reserve-Gebirgs-Division
- Unit insignia
- Active: 5 November 1939 - 8 May 1945
- Disbanded: 8 May 1945
- Country: Nazi Germany
- Branch: German Army
- Type: Gebirgsjäger
- Role: Bandenbekämpfung; Mountain warfare
- Size: Division
- Garrison/HQ: Salzburg; Innsbruck

German Division Nr. 188 was raised in late 1939. It consisted of the 136th, 138th and 139th Mountain Replacement Regiments and the 112th Artillery Replacement Regiment, plus supporting units. It began the war on border guard duty in the mountainous region between Austria and Yugoslavia with the primary mission of training reservists and replacements for the regular mountain divisions. In the spring of 1941 it joined the invasion of Yugoslavia, with the three mountain regiments given responsibility of seizing control of Carniola and Carinthia on the Yugoslav side of the border, which they carried out quickly and effectively against little to no resistance.

After the campaign, the division remained in reserve at Innsbruck. On 8 October 1943 it was redesignated as the 188th Reserve Mountain Division and reorganized with Reserve Mountain Regiments 136, 137, 138, and 139, each with two battalions, and Reserve Artillery Regiment 112, also with two battalions, and transferred to northern Italy. On 27 February 1944 it was transferred to Istria to conduct security warfare (Bandenbekämpfung). A few days later it was again redesignated as the 188th Mountain Division and its regiments were redesignated as Mountain Regiments 901, 902, 903, 904 and Mountain Artillery Regiment 1088. It surrendered in Istria when the war ended in 1945.

== Commanders ==
- Generalleutnant z.V. Hans von Hößlin (26.08.1939 - 08.05.1945) : condemned for war crimes in Yugoslavia and hanged in Ljubljana on 18 August 1947.

== Area of operations ==
- Austria (August 1939 - April 1941)
- Yugoslavia - as Division Nr. 188 (April 1941 - April 1943)
- Austria (April 1943 - October 1943)
- Italy & Slovenia - as 188. Reserve-Gebirgs-Division (October 1943 - March 1944)
- Italy & Slovenia - as 188. Gebirgs-Division (March 1944 - May 1945)

== Bibliography ==
- George F. Nafziger - The German Order of Battle: Infantry in World War II
- Shelby L. Stanton (1990). "Facts Behind the Counters: Into the Balkans with Division Nr. 188". Europa. 15: 12–14.
- Tessin, Georg. Verbände und Truppen der deutschen Wehrmacht und Waffen-SS im Zweiten Weltkrieg 1939-1945; Band 7 Osnabruck: Biblio, 1973 ISBN 3-7648-0872-1
