= Gebirgsjäger =

German military term

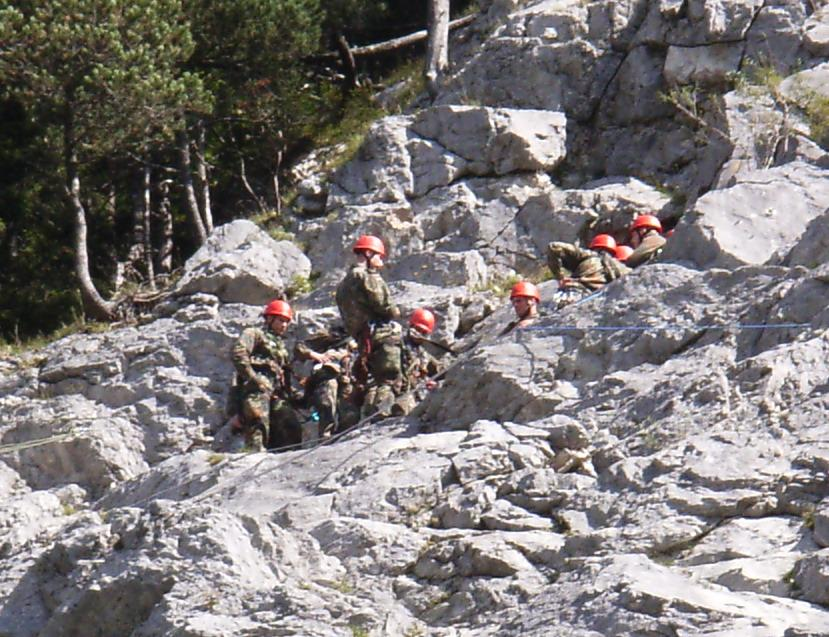
Gebirgsjäger of the German Army during a climbing exercise

Gebirgsjäger (German pronunciation: [ɡəˈbɪʁksˌjɛːɡɐ]) is a German military term for light infantry trained in mountain warfare. Currently used in the militaries of Germany, Austria and Switzerland, the term includes the word jäger, another German military term used to denote light infantry troops.

== Origins ==
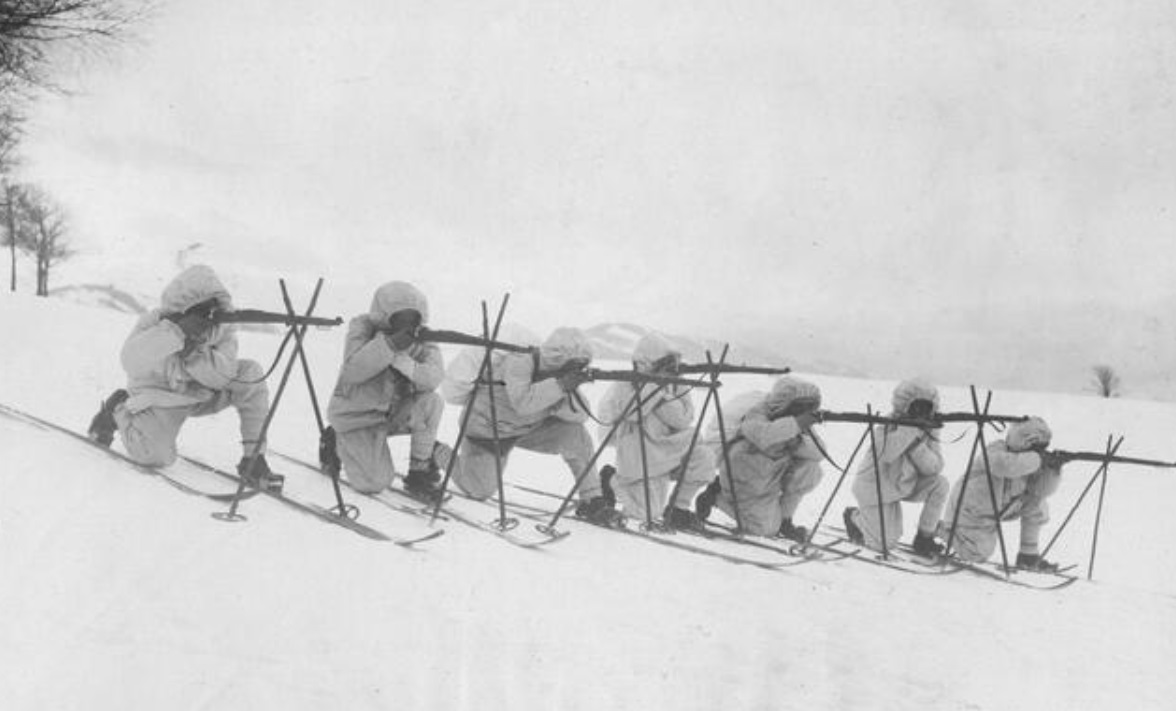
Imperial German soldiers on skis wearing snow camouflage in 1916

The mountain infantry of Austria have their roots in the three Landesschützen regiments of the Austro-Hungarian Empire. The mountain infantry of modern Germany carry on certain traditions of the German Alpenkorps (Alpine corps) of World War I. Both countries' mountain infantry share the Edelweiß insignia, established in 1907 as a symbol of the Austro-Hungarian Landesschützen regiments by Emperor Franz Joseph I. These troops wore the edelweiss on the uniform collar. When the Alpenkorps served alongside the Landesschützen on Austria's southern frontier against Italian forces from May 1915, the Landesschützen honoured the men of the Alpenkorps by awarding them their own insignia: the edelweiss.

== Gebirgsjäger in World War II ==
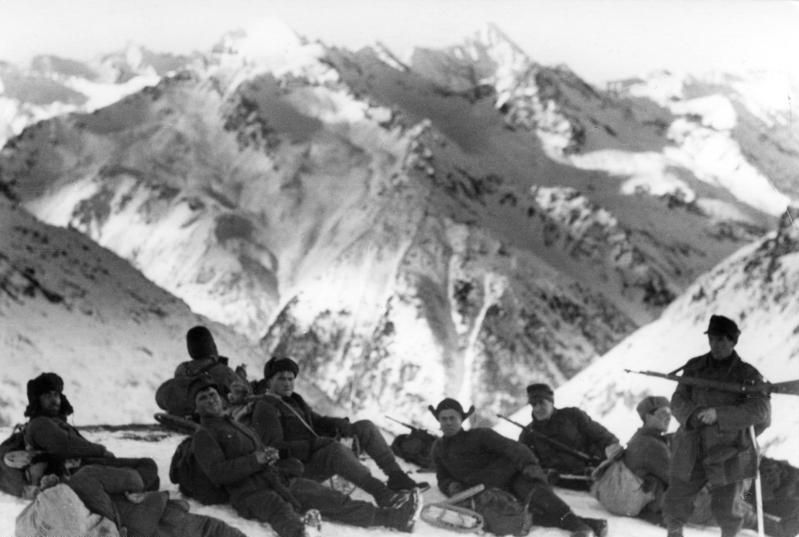
Gebirgsjäger group in late 1942 during the Battle of the Caucasus

During World War II the Wehrmacht and Waffen-SS raised a number of mountain infantry units, identified by the edelweiss insignia worn on their sleeves and caps.

These divisions were lightly equipped, with much of the transport provided by mules. They were equipped with fewer automatic weapons than regular infantry, however the MG 34 or MG 42 machine gunners were provided with more ammunition than their regular infantry counterparts. Special equipment was made for them including the G33/40 mauser rifle based on the VZ.33 rifle.

Mountain infantry participated in many campaigns, including Operations Weserübung, Silver Fox, Platinum Fox, Arctic Fox and Northern Lights. They also served in the Caucasus, the invasion of Crete, the Balkans, the Gothic Line, and the battles in the Vosges region of France.

=== Heer (Army) Mountain divisions ===
- 1st Mountain Division (later 1st Volksgebirgs Division)
- 2nd Mountain Division
- 3rd Mountain Division
- 4th Mountain Division
- 5th Mountain Division
- 6th Mountain Division
- 7th Mountain Division (previously 99th Light Infantry Division)
- 8th Mountain Division (previously Division Nr. 157, 157th Reserve Division, 157th Mountain Division)
- 9th Mountain Division (previously Shadow Division Steiermark and Division zbV 140)
- 188th Mountain Division (previously Division Nr. 188, 188th Reserve Mountain Division)

=== Waffen SS Mountain divisions ===
- 6th SS Mountain Division Nord
- 7th SS Volunteer Mountain Division Prinz Eugen
- 13th Waffen Mountain Division of the SS Handschar (1st Croatian)
- 21st Waffen Mountain Division of the SS Skanderbeg (1st Albanian)
- 23rd Waffen Mountain Division of the SS Kama (2nd Croatian)
- 24th Waffen Mountain Division of the SS Karstjäger

== Gebirgsjäger in the modern German forces ==
Badge of the Gebirgsjägerbrigade 23 shows an edelweiss, traditional symbol for German mountain forces.

Upon the creation of the Bundeswehr in 1956, the mountain infantry returned as a distinctive arm of the West German army. Until 2001, they were organized as the 1. Gebirgsdivision, disbanded as part of Bundeswehr reductions at the end of the cold war. The successor unit is Gebirgsjägerbrigade 23 which has its headquarters in Bad Reichenhall. The battalions of these units are deployed in southern Bavaria, the only high mountain area in Germany touching the Northern Alps. Since 2008 the unit is officially called "Gebirgsjägerbrigade 23 Bayern (Bavaria)" to mark the close relationship between the state and the Gebirgsjäger.

In mid-2020, the official Bundeswehr website stated that the brigade had a strength of approximately 5,300 soldiers.

=== Traditions ===
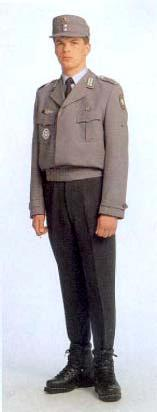
A German Gebirgsjäger wearing the formal uniform with the characteristic clothes and boots

The soldiers of the mountain infantry wear a grey cap (Bergmütze) with an edelweiss on its left side, stem to the front. This distinguishes them from all other German army soldiers who wear berets and the Austrian army, whose edelweiss has its stem to the back. The formal uniform, which is based on traditional alpine mountain climbing trekking outfits (Berganzug), is also different from the standard mainstream German army uniform, and consists of a light-weight grey ski blouse (Skibluse), black Stirrup trousers (Keilhose) or especially during the summer periods "Culottes" knee-breeches (kniebundhose) similar to knickerbockers, and ankle-height mountaineering boots (Bergstiefel) or dual-use mountaineering ski boots.

German Gebirgsjäger traditionally share a very close comradeship and distinct esprit de corps. There is also a special perception of discipline which can for example be seen in a relatively informal relationship between officers and soldiers during normal day duty.

=== Tasks of the German Gebirgsjäger ===
The main tasks of the German mountain infantry are:

- Warfare in extreme weather conditions
- Winter warfare
- Warfare in urban terrain
- Warfare in arctic, mountain and desert terrain

== 23rd Gebirgsjägerbrigade ==
As of 1 March 2025 the brigade is organized as follows:

- Gebirgsjäger Brigade 23 (Gebirgsjägerbrigade 23), in Bad Reichenhall
  - Staff and Signal Company Gebirgsjäger Brigade 23 (Stabs- und Fernmeldekompanie der Gebirgsjägerbrigade 23), in Bad Reichenhall
  - Mountain Pack Animal Operations and Training Center 230 (Einsatz- und Ausbildungszentrum für Gebirgstragtierwesen 230), in Bad Reichenhall
  - Gebirgsjäger Battalion 231 (Gebirgsjägerbataillon 231), in Bad Reichenhall with Bv206S
  - Gebirgsjäger Battalion 232 (Gebirgsjägerbataillon 232), in Bischofswiesen with Bv206S
  - Gebirgsjäger Battalion 233 (Gebirgsjägerbataillon 233), in Mittenwald with Bv206S
  - Mountain Reconnaissance Company 23 (Gebirgsaufklärungskompanie 23), in Füssen
  - Mountain Engineer Company 23 (Gebirgspionierkompanie 23), in Ingolstadt
  - Mountain Supply Company 23 (Gebirgsversorgungskompanie 23), in Bad Reichenhall and Mittenwald

Mountain units which are not part of the Gebirgsjägerbrigade 23:

- Mountain and Winter Combat Training Base (Ausbildungsstützpunkt Gebirgs- und Winterkampf), in Mittenwald

As the Gebirgsjägerbrigade 23 is part of the so-called stabilisation forces (Stabilisierungskräfte), it lacks any accompanying artillery. Mortar support is provided by the Schwere Jägerkompanie (heavy infantry company) in every mountain infantry battalion.

=== Equipment and organization ===
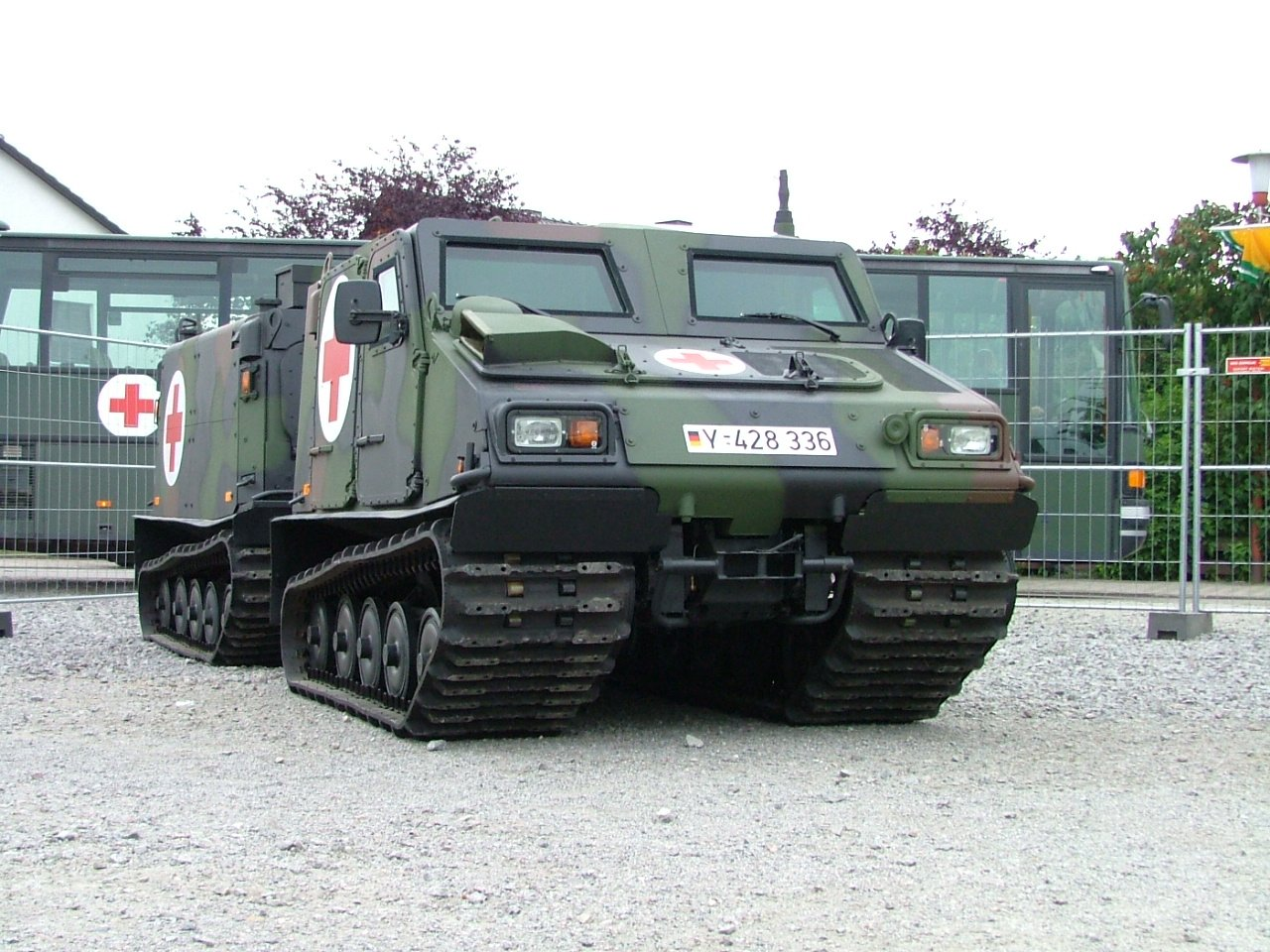
A Bv 206S as a medical transporter. The 206S is the standard transport vehicle of the German mountain infantry.

A mountain infantry battalion consists of about 900 soldiers in five companies. One company is responsible for staff and support duties and has a "Hochgebirgsjägerzug" (special platoon for high mountain fight and reconnaissance) at its disposal. Three companies are consisting of classical mountain infantry, another one is a heavy company which is equipped with the Wiesel AWC for mortar support, tank defence and supporting cannon fire with 20 mm guns. Two of the three mountain infantry battalions are equipped with the Hägglund 206S, one with the GTK Boxer.

- Equipment of the Gebirgsjäger (selection):
  - Wiesel AWC
  - Bandvagn 206
  - Snowmobiles
  - Military versions of the Unimog

== Gebirgsjäger in the modern Austrian forces ==
Today the traditions of the Austrian mountain infantry are maintained by the 6th Gebirgsbrigade in western Austria

=== Units ===
List of active mountain infantry in the Austrian Armed Forces as of 2013:

- 6th Gebirgsbrigade
  - Brigadekommando (HQ) in Absam
  - Stabsbataillon 6 (HQ battalion) in Innsbruck
  - Jägerbataillon 23 (Mountain infantry battalion) in Bludesch
  - Jägerbataillon 24 (Mountain infantry battalion) in Lienz
  - Jägerbataillon 26 (Mountain infantry battalion) in Spittal
  - Pionierbataillon 2 (Combat engineer battalion) in Salzburg

== Gebirgs troops in the modern Swiss forces ==
Specially trained Swiss mountain troops have been a part of the Swiss Army since 1892 when the 3rd Army Corps was established. A central mountain combat school was opened in Andermatt in 1967.

== Notable members ==
Also see Alpenkorps for the World War I era unit.

- Karl-Theodor zu Guttenberg—German politician
- Hubert Lanz—General der Gebirgstruppe during World War II
- Prince Ludwig of Bavaria
- Edmund Stoiber—German politician
- August Winter—General der Gebirgstruppe during World War II

== See also ==
- List of mountain warfare forces
- General der Gebirgstruppe
- Imperial-Royal Mountain Troops (Austria-Hungary)
- Jäger (infantry)
- Mountain Guide Badge

=== Similar units ===
- Argentina: Cazadores de Montaña (Argentine Army)
- France: Chasseurs Alpins
- Italy: Alpini
- Poland: Podhale rifles
- Romania: Vânători de munte
- Sweden: Bergsjägare, part of the Norrland Dragoon Regiment
- Turkish Land Forces
  - Commando Training School Command (Isparta)
  - 2nd Commando Brigade (Turkey) (Bolu)
  - Hakkari Mountain and Commando Brigade
- United Kingdom
  - United Kingdom Commando Force
    - Mountain Leaders
- United States:
  - 10th Mountain Division
  - 172nd Infantry Regiment
  - 1st Battalion (Mountain), 157th Infantry Regiment, Colorado Army National Guard
