= 20th Parachute Division =

German WWII airborne division

- German: 20. Fallschirmjäger-Division
- Active: 1945
- Disbanded: 1945
- Country: Germany
- Branch: Luftwaffe
- Type: Fallschirmjäger
- Role: Airborne force
- Size: Division

Commanders
- Notable commanders: Walter Barenthin

The 20th Parachute Division (German: 20. Fallschirmjäger-Division) was a division of the German military during the Second World War, which did not see combat.

The division was formed in March 1945 in the Netherlands, out of troops from the disbanded Paratrooper Training and Replacement Division (Fallschirmjäger Ausbildungs-und-Ersatz-Division), commanded by Walter Barenthin. It contained the 58th, 59th and 60th Fallschirmjäger Regiments, and the 20th Fallschirmjäger Artillery Regiment.

The division did not manage to form fully before the end of the war, and did not see combat.
