= 399th Infantry Division =

- German: 399. Infanterie-Division
- Active: 15 March 1940 – 8 August 1940
- Country: Nazi Germany
- Branch: Army (Wehrmacht)
- Type: Infantry
- Size: Division
- Garrison/HQ: Zichenau
- Engagements: None

The 399th Infantry Division (German: 399. Infanterie-Division) was an infantry division of the Heer, the ground forces of the German Wehrmacht, during World War II. The division was active from March to August 1940.

== History ==
The 399th Infantry Division was formed on 15 March 1940 as a division of the ninth wave of deployment in the government district Zichenau (southern East Prussia) using personnel from the staff of the former 421st Division z.b.V. and several Landesschützen Regiments. The division initially consisted of the Infantry Regiments 662 (assembled at Zichenau), 663 (assembled at Modlin) and 664 (assembled at Plock). The Regiments 662 and 664 initially consisted of three battalions, whereas Infantry Regiment 663 initially only had two, for a total of eight battalions across the entire division. Additionally, the 399th Infantry Division was assigned an artillery battery, a reconnaissance squadron and a signals company. The personnel of its infantry regiments was drawn from older men that had been conscripted upon general mobilization in September 1939.

Throughout the entire tenure of service of the 399th Infantry Division, the divisional commander was Helmuth von Kropff.

The division was on frontier guard duty in East Prussia (Wehrkreis I), where it was supervised by Higher Command XXXII as its superior formation. Throughout its time of service, the 399th Division remained in its home region, southern East Prussia, where it served on frontier guard duty on the border with the Soviet Union.

On 30 March, Infantry Regiment 663 received a third battalion (III./663) by the redesignation of II./664, which was subsequently reassembled to bring the division up to nine battalions. On 19 June 1940, during the Battle of France, the division began the assembly of a dedicated artillery regiment (Artillery Regiment 399), which reached two detachments in strength. However, following the German victory in the Battle of France, an order was issued on 22 July 1940 to dissolve multiple of the ninth wave division on Germany's eastern flanks. This order was carried out for the 399th Division on 8 August 1940, when the division was dissolved. The three battalions of Regiment 662, as well as the regiments I./663, II./663, II./664 and III./664 were subsequently used as home guard battalions in German-occupied Poland to oversee the construction of border fortifications by German-held prisoners of war. On 1 January 1941, III./662 and II./663 became the Landesschützen Battalions 235 and 236; the other battalions were dissolved without replacement.
