= 9th Mountain Division =

- 9. Gebirgs-Division
- Active: 1945
- Country: Nazi Germany
- Branch: German Army
- Type: Gebirgsjäger
- Role: Mountain warfare
- Size: Division
- Engagements: World War II

The 9th Mountain Division (German: 9. Gebirgs Division) was the name given to two separate German military divisions by accident in 1945.

== Operational histories ==
Two simultaneous but independent attempts were made to raise the division in the waning days of the war; the resulting units are conventionally distinguished as Nord ("North") and Ost ("East"), after the respective theaters where they were being assembled. For all practical purposes the 9th Mountain Division never fully came into being.

=== Northern division ===
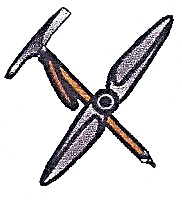
Northern divisio insignia

In the spring of 1944, the 139th Mountain Regiment, which had been left in Lapland by the 3rd Mountain Division when it withdrew at the end of 1941, was reinforced to become Divisionsgruppe Kräutler. In September it received the additional designation of 140th Special Purposes Division, and as a result is mentioned once in late-war documentation as "Div.Gr.K (Div.z.b.V.140)". On May 6, 1945, the OKW issued an order re-designating it as the 9th Mountain Division, but the order came so late that it is not actually listed as such on any situation maps or other official records. The unit had withdrawn from Lappland into Norway as German fortunes in the Arctic waned, and surrendered to the British at the end of the war. Its commander was Mathias Kräutler. (Some documentation from the post-war period further confuses matters by referring to this unit as the 10th Mountain Division.)

=== Eastern Division ===
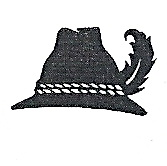
Eastern Division insignia

In the spring of 1945, Shadow Division Steiermark controlled two RAD brigades, and these were mobilized for combat duty as an "Alarm" division under the name Mountain Division Steiermark. The division's two regiments were composed of a very diverse mix of personnel from the Army, Luftwaffe, Kriegsmarine, Waffen-SS, police, and other organizations. It appears also to be related to Kampfgruppe Raithel and/or Kampfgruppe Semmering, though the late-war documentation is weak. Its elements surrendered to the Soviets at the end of the war.
Its commander was Colonel Heribert Raithel.

== Order of battle ==
- 9th Mountain Division (Northern group)
  - 139th Mountain Infantry Regiment
  - 931st Artillery Regiment (cadre)
    - I/112th Mountain Infantry Regiment
    - II/82nd Mountain Artillery Regiment
  - 3rd Jaeger Battalion
  - 6th Jaeger Battalion
  - 124th Mountain Artillery Battalion
  - 140th Mountain Engineer Battalion
  - 140th Mountain Signal Battalion
  - 424th Light Assault Gun Battalion
  - 140th Divisional Supply Troops
