= 8th Mountain Division =

157th Infantry Division 157th Mountain Division 8th Mountain Division
- 157. Infanterie-Division; 157. Gebirgs-Division; 8. Gebirgs-Division
- Unit insignia
- Active: 1945
- Country: Nazi Germany
- Branch: German Army
- Type: Gebirgsjäger
- Role: Mountain warfare
- Size: Division
- Engagements: World War II

Insignia
- Identification symbol
- Identification symbol: Division arm insignia, monk with beer mug

The 8th Mountain Division (German: 8. Gebirgs Division) was formed on 27 February 1945 by the redesignation of the 157th Mountain Division, which itself had been formed from the 157th Infantry Division in September 1944, and which had participated in operations against the maquis of Vercors. The division was stationed in France until the Italian surrender when it then moved to Italy taking 5,772 prisoners in two days during the disarmament of the Italian Army. The division remained in Italy for the rest of the war and surrendered to the Americans in April, 1945.

== Commander ==
- Generalleutnant Paul Schricker

== Order of battle ==
- Gebirgsjäger Regiment 296
  - 3 x Battalions
- Gebirgsjäger Regiment 297
  - 3 x Battalions
- Gebirgs Artillery Regiment 1057
- Feldersatz Battalion 1057
- Panzerjäger Battalion 157
- Reconnaissance Battalion 1057
- Gebirgs Pionier Battalion 1057
- Gebirgs Signals Battalion 1057
- Division Supply troop 1057

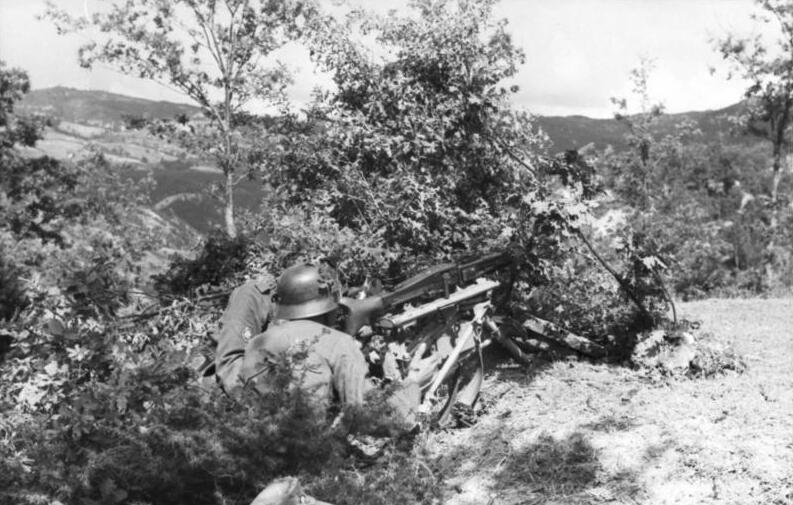
German Mountain troops with MG 42 Italy 1944
