= 166th Infantry Division (Wehrmacht) =

- 166. Infanterie-Division
- Active: 10 October 1939 – 8 May 1945
- Country: Nazi Germany
- Allegiance: Wehrmacht
- Branch: Infantry
- Size: Division
- Garrison/HQ: Białystok

The 166th Infantry Division (German: 166. Infanterie-Division) was an infantry division of the German Heer during World War II. The unit, at times designated Commander of Reserve Troops 2 of Wehrkreis VI

German: Kommandeur der Ersatztruppen 2 des Wehrkreis VI), 166th Division (German: 166. Division), Division No. 166 (German: Division Nr. 166), and 166th Reserve Division (German: 166. Reserve-Division), was active between 1939 and 1945.

== History ==
The original staff that would eventually become the 166th Division was the Commander of Reserve Troops 2 of Wehrkreis VI, which was formed in Bielefeld on 10 October 1939. Initially, this staff served to assist the original Commander of Reserve Troops for the sixth Wehrkreis, which would eventually become the 154th Infantry Division.

This staff was moved to the newly formed Wehrkreis XX, which was headquartered in Białystok in occupied Poland, on 15 November 1939. As part of this move, the staff became the 166th Division. The initial divisional forces consisted of several reserve formations from Wehrkreis VI. The initial divisional commander was Walter Behschnitt, who served until May 1940.

=== Division No. 166 ===
On 21 December 1939, the division was renamed Division No. 166.

In March 1940, Division No. 166 consisted of the following formations:

- Infantry Reserve Regiment 6, Danzig.
- Infantry Reserve Regiment 16, Danzig.
- Infantry Reserve Regiment 26, Mewe (later Schwetz)
- Infantry Reserve Regiment 69, Marienburg.
- Infantry Reserve Regiment 86, Deutsch-Eylau.
- Artillery Reserve Regiment 6, Elbing.
- Cavalry Reserve Regiment 15, Preußisch Stargard.
- Pioneer Reserve Battalion 6, Elbing.
- Pioneer Reserve Battalion 16, Elbing.
- Intelligence Reserve Detachment 6, Elbing.
- Intelligence Reserve Detachment 16, Elbing (later Graudenz).
- Vehicle Reserve Detachment 6, Marienwerder.

On 25 August 1940, Division No. 166, now commanded by Otto Schellert, was deployed back to Bielefeld. Several formations were reassigned, leaving the division with the following structure in August 1940:

- Infantry Reserve Regiment 6, Osnabrück.
- Infantry Reserve Regiment 16, Münster.
- Infantry Reserve Regiment 69, Detmold.
- Infantry Reserve Regiment 86, Herford.
- Artillery Reserve Regiment 6, Osnabrück.
- Observation Reserve Detachment 6, Lemgo.
- Reserve Regiment z.b.V. Münster.
- Pioneer Reserve Battalion 6, Minden.
- Pioneer Reserve Battalion 26, Höxter.
- Bridge Reserve Battalion 2, Minden.
- Panzerjäger Reserve Detachment 6, Herford.
- Vehicle Reserve Detachment 6, Soest.
- Kraftfahr Reserve Detachment 6, Dortmund.
- Construction Reserve Battalion 6, Arnsberg.

On 15 March 1941, Christian Friedrich, commonly known as Fritz Willich, took command of the division. He was in turn succeeded by Helmuth Castorf on 1 June 1942.

As part of the reorganization of the Replacement Army on 1 October 1942, several formations of Division No. 166 were transferred to other units, mainly the Division No. 526. This resulted in the following structure for Division No. 166 as of 15 October 1942:

- Infantry Reserve Regiment 6, Osnabrück.
- Infantry Reserve Regiment 69, Detmold.
- Infantry Reserve Regiment 86, Herford.
- Artillery Reserve Regiment 6, Osnabrück.
- Artillery Reserve Regiment 16, Dortmund.

In January 1943, the division staff was redeployed, along with its exercise units, to occupied Denmark, whereas the replacement units were transferred to the new Division No. 179. The initial headquarters of the 166th in Denmark was in Copenhagen.

=== 166th Reserve Division ===
On 26 October 1943, Division No. 166, still in Denmark, was renamed 166th Reserve Division. The division, now headquartered at Holstebro, consisted of the following formations in December 1943:

- 166th Reserve Division Command, Holstebro
- Reserve Grenadier Regiment 6, Roskilde.
- Reserve Grenadier Regiment 69, Struer.
- Reserve Grenadier Regiment 86, Ringköbing.
- Reserve Artillery Detachment 6, Ulfborg.
- Reserve Pioneer Battalion 26, Aarhus.

Eberhard von Fabrice took command of the division on 10 July 1944.

The 166th Reserve Division, mostly unchanged but now headquartered at Lemvig, consisted of the following formations in December 1944:

- 166th Reserve Division Command, Lemvig
- Reserve Grenadier Regiment 6, Tisted.
- Reserve Grenadier Regiment 69, Klinkby.
- Reserve Grenadier Regiment 86, Rindum.
- Reserve Artillery Regiment 1066, Lemvig.
- Divisional Panzerjäger Company 166, Lomborg.
- Reserve Pioneer Battalion 26, Struer.
- Commander of Supply Troops 1066, Gudum.
- Intelligence Company (motorized) Denmark 2.
- Fortress Companies 6/110, 7/110, 8/110, 9/110.

In January 1945, an additional regiment, Reserve Grenadier Regiment z.b.V. 166, was formed and assigned to the 166th Reserve Division.

=== 166th Infantry Division ===
On 9 March 1945, several Reserve Divisions, including the 166th, became full Infantry Divisions. Its subordinate reserve regiments were upgraded to full regiments, leaving the 166th Infantry Division with the following structure in March 1945:

- Grenadier Regiment 660 (formerly Reserve Grenadier Regiment 6).
- Grenadier Regiment 661 (formerly Reserve Grenadier Regiment 69).
- Grenadier Regiment 662 (formerly Reserve Grenadier Regiment 86).
- Artillery Regiment 1066 (formerly Reserve Artillery Regiment 1066).
- Pioneer Battalion 1066 (formerly Volkssturm Battalion 400).

On 28 March 1945, Fabrice was briefly replaced as divisional commander by Helmuth Walter, but he assumed command once more on 31 March 1945. He remained in command until the end of the war.

The 166th Infantry Division did not see combat until German surrender on 8 May 1945. It was still in the Lemvig area at the time of surrender.

== Superior formations ==
Between February 1943 and May 1945, the 166th Division in its various iterations was directly subordinate to the Wehrmacht Commander in Denmark.

== Noteworthy individuals ==
- Walter Behschnitt, divisional commander starting 15 November 1939.
- Otto Schellert, divisional commander starting 1 May 1940.
- Christian Friedrich ("Fritz Willich"), divisional commander starting 15 March 1941.
- Helmuth Castorf, divisional commander starting 1 June 1942.
- Eberhard von Fabrice, divisional commander starting 10 July 1944 as well as 31 March 1945.
- Helmuth Walter, divisional commander starting 28 March 1945.
