= 209th Infantry Division (Wehrmacht) =

German World War II military unit

The 209th Infantry Division (German: 209. Infanterie-Division) was a German infantry division of the German Heer during World War II.

== Operational history ==
The 209th Infantry Division was one of the divisions deployed in the immediate leadup to the Invasion of Poland as part of the third Aufstellungswelle. It was first formed on 26 August 1939 in Komotau in Wehrkreis IV. It initially consisted of the Infantry Regiments 304, 394, and 414, as well as Artillery Regiment 209.

The division was deployed in the reserves of 1st Army (Erwin von Witzleben) under Army Group C (Wilhelm Ritter von Leeb), which was tasked with the defense of Germany's western border with France. By November, it was moved to XXXII Army Corps and was transferred into occupied Poland. The division came to the eastern border with the Soviet Union while the army's main forces focussed on the Battle of France.

Following an order from 24 July 1940, the division was dissolved on 24 August 1940. The Infantry Regiments 304 and 394 became the Rifle Regiments 304 and 394 with the 2nd Panzer Division and the 3rd Panzer Division. The division's engineers joined the 11th Panzer Division, the intelligence detachment became part of the newly formed 18th Panzer Division. The Infantry Regiment 414 was used to guard PoWs.

== Noteworthy Individuals ==
- Hans Stengel, divisional commander in 1939.
- Wolf Schede, divisional commander in 1940.
