= Z. b. V. =

z. b. V. (also z.b.V., ZBV, ZbV, and zbV) is an abbreviation for the German phrase zur besonderen Verwendung, or alternatively the synonymous phrase zur besonderen Verfügung.

== Translation ==
Translations for the phrases zur besonderen Verwendung and zur besonderen Verfügung include:

- 'for special deployment'.
- 'for special duties'.

== Uses ==
=== Economy ===
During World War II, some German state-controlled businesses in the civilian and military economy received the z. b. V. designation.

=== Wehrmacht ===
In the Wehrmacht, the German armed forces during World War II, officer staffs designated z. b. V. had no subordinate combat troops. Those staffs stood by in general reserves or in the reserves of particular armies or army groups and waited to be activated as the staffs of new combat units. The German air force had similar z. b. V. staffs for regional air defense purposes, the Luftgaustäbe.

Next to officer staffs, singular officers could also be designated z. b. V., such as Gen. z.b.V.b. ObdH, General zur besonderen Verfügung beim Oberbefehlshaber des Heeres, 'general attached to the commander-in-chief of the army'.

In 1941, Wehrmacht probationary and punishment units started also to receive the z.b.V. designation. Such units were made up of men that were convicted of minor and disciplinary offenses and had a specific criteria for joining. However, as the war progressed, the criteria would soon be limited only to fitness for combat and mental health. By the war's end, almost all of the requirements were dropped, and the units were filled with men completely unfit for combat, which made them lose any effectiveness.

== See also ==
- GmbH
