= Volksgrenadier =

Type of German infantry in World War II

Volksgrenadier, also spelt Volks-Grenadier, was the name given to a type of German Army division formed in the autumn of 1944 after the double loss of Army Group Centre to the Soviets in Operation Bagration and the Fifth Panzer Army to the Western Allies in Normandy. The name itself was intended to build morale, appealing at once to nationalism (Volk) and Germany's older military traditions (Grenadier). Germany formed 78 VGDs during the war. Volksgrenadier divisions were professional military formations with standardized weapons and equipment, unlike the unrelated Volkssturm militia.

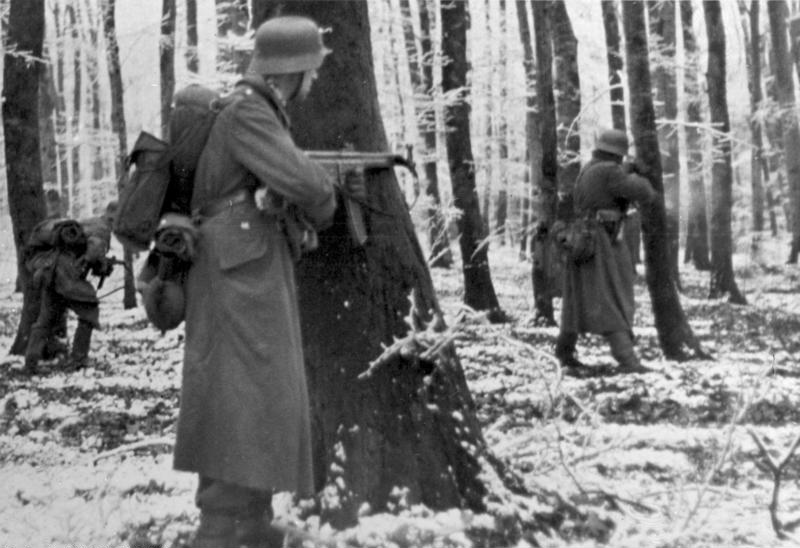
Volksgrenadiers, armed with StG 44 rifles, fighting in the Ardennes, 22nd of December, 1944.

== History and organization ==
The strategic emergency and concomitant manpower shortage resulting from the losses in mid-1944 required the creation of infantry divisions that economized on personnel and emphasized defensive strength over offensive strength. The Volksgrenadier divisions met this need by using only six line infantry battalions instead of the normal nine for infantry divisions – already a common reality for many existing divisions. The units also had a higher proportion of submachine guns and light automatic weapons and thus relied more on short-range firepower than in standard German Army infantry units. Automatic weapons like the new Sturmgewehr 44 and anti-tank weaponry like the single shot Panzerfaust were also used by Volksgrenadier units. One battalion of one grenadier regiment and the two companies of the engineer battalion were assigned bicycles for transportation instead of motor vehicles.

They were organized around small cadres of hardened veteran soldiers, noncommissioned officers and officers, and then bulked out with anything the Replacement Army could supply: "jobless" personnel of the shrinking Kriegsmarine and Luftwaffe stranded due to fuel shortages, recovered wounded soldiers from broken formations returning to duty from hospitals, convicted civilian or military criminals forced to fight under the threat of execution by firing squad, older men who would have been considered too old or too unfit for the peacetime army, and young men and teenagers from the latest conscription classes were all recruited into the ranks.

=== Organisation ===
- Division headquarters
- Fusilier company or battalion (bicycle-mounted)
  - Company headquarters
  - Two Submachine gun platoons
  - Rifle platoon
  - Heavy weapons platoon
  - Infantry howitzer section
- Signal battalion
  - Battalion headquarters
  - Telephone company
  - Radio company
  - Supply platoon
- Three grenadier regiments, each with
  - Regimental headquarters
  - Regimental headquarters company
  - Two infantry battalions
  - Antitank rocket launcher company
- Artillery regiment
  - Regimental headquarters
  - Regimental headquarters battery
  - 75 mm gun battalion
  - Two 105 mm gun/howitzer battalions
  - 150 mm howitzer battalion
- Antitank battalion
  - Battalion headquarters
  - Battalion headquarters company
  - Antitank company (motorized)
  - Antitank company (self-propelled)
  - Antiaircraft company (self-propelled)
- Engineer battalion
  - Battalion headquarters company
  - Two engineer companies (bicycle-mounted)
- Supply regiment
  - Supply troops
  - Ordnance company
  - Maintenance platoon
  - Administrative troops
  - Medical troops
  - Veterinary company
  - Field post office

== Battles ==
Volksgrenadier divisions participated in battles in eastern France, the defense of the Siegfried Line, Operation Market Garden, the Battle of the Scheldt, the Battle of the Bulge, the Battle of Otterlo, the Eastern Front, and in the final battles in Germany itself. Some Volksgrenadier divisions performed well, while others were rushed into battle with a minimum of training. Several Volksgrenadier divisions, especially those made up of "jobless" Wehrmacht personnel drawn from the Kriegsmarine and the Luftwaffe, often displayed high motivation and morale which resulted in good cohesion and military effectiveness against the Allied forces in the last eight or so months (about October 1944 through May 1945) of the war in Europe.

== See also ==
- List of German divisions in World War II
