= Odessa Offensive =

Offensive operation in southern Ukraine

- Part of the Dnieper–Carpathian offensive on the Eastern Front of World War II
- T-34's, with tank riders on them, advance near the Razdelnaya railway station in the vicinity of Odessa, April 1944. Photo taken by Olga Lander
Date	Offensive phase: 26 March–14 April 1944; Expansion of bridgeheads on the western bank of the Dniester: 15–30 April 1944
Location	Southern Ukraine
Result	Soviet victory
Territorial changes	Soviets fully reclaim the southern part of the Ukrainian SSR

Belligerents
Soviet Union	Germany (Kingdom of Romania) Romania (Slovak Republic (1939–1945)) Slovakia

Commanders and leaders
Rodion Malinovsky	Ferdinand Schörner (Army Group South Ukraine); Maximilian de Angelis (6th Army) (Kingdom of Romania) Petre Dumitrescu (3rd Army)

Units involved
3rd Ukrainian Front	Army Group South Ukraine: 6th Army; (Kingdom of Romania) 3rd Army; (Slovak Republic (1939–1945)) 1st Mobile Infantry Division

Strength
3rd Ukrainian Front on 28 March 1944: 470,000 men in total; 12,678 guns and mortars; 435 tanks and self-propelled guns in total; 436 combat aircraft	6th Army on 1 April 1944: 188,551 men in total; (Kingdom of Romania) 3rd Army on 19 April 1944: 38,000 men in total (Romanian divisions only, without the 14th Inf. Div.); (Slovak Republic (1939–1945)) 1st Mobile Infantry Division: 5,500 men in total; (as of 19 April 1944)

Casualties and losses
3rd Ukrainian Front personnel losses in April 1944: 13,515 killed; 44,793 wounded; 1,363 missing; 9,004 sick and other non-combat losses; 68,675 in total 120 tanks and self-propelled guns destroyed 65 tanks and self-propelled guns damaged	6th Army losses in April 1944: 4,672 killed; 16,205 wounded; 6,014 missing; 6,479 sick; 33,370 in total; (Kingdom of Romania) 3rd Army Unknown (Slovak Republic (1939–1945)) 1st Mobile Infantry Division Unknown

The Odessa Offensive Operation (Russian: Одесская Наступательная Операция, Odesskaya Nastupatel'naya Operatsiya), known on the German side as the Defensive battle of the 6th Army between Bug and Dniester (German: Abwehrschlacht der 6. Armee zwischen Bug und Dnjestr), was an offensive operation conducted in southern Ukraine by the Soviet 3rd Ukrainian Front against the German 6th Army and Romanian 3rd Army of Army Group South Ukraine (until 5 April 1944 Army Group A) in late March–April 1944. It was part of the second phase of the Dnieper-Carpathian Strategic Offensive.

The offensive followed the Soviet Bereznegovatoye–Snigirevka offensive launched in early March that pushed the German 6th Army back behind the Southern Bug river and captured several bridgeheads across the river. After expanding and consolidating the bridgeheads, the Odessa Offensive began on 28 March. The 3rd Ukrainian Front sought to rout the Axis forces between the Southern Bug and Dniester rivers, liberate the northwestern coast of the Black Sea, including the major port city of Odessa, and reach the Soviet-Romanian border on the Dniester. On the first day, Soviet units advancing along the Black Sea coast captured the important port of Nikolayev, while those in the northern sector broke through, spearheaded by Pliev's Cavalry-Mechanized Group.

These Soviet penetrations threatened both flanks of the 6th Army and as a result it began a hasty retreat along the entire front. In the course of this retreat in early April 1944, the 6th Army sustained further heavy personnel losses and lost a considerable part of its artillery, anti-tank guns, motor and armoured vehicles in the mud. With the Cavalry-Mechanized Group capturing the important Razdelnaya railway station on 4 April 1944, the front of the 6th Army was split in two – one part being pushed back to Tiraspol area, the other being enveloped from the northwest and pressed against Odessa. The threat of encirclement loomed for the latter part.

On the evening of 9 April, Soviet units reached the outskirts of Odessa, with German-Romanian forces and their rear services making a chaotic withdrawal to the Ovidiopol area, the only open path left, after which they crossed the Dniester Estuary. By 10 a.m. on 10 April, Odessa was completely cleared from Axis forces. Between 10 and 14 April, all across the front, the Red Army pursued the German forces to the Dniester, with first Soviet units reaching its eastern bank on 11 April. On 12 April, the Soviets took Tiraspol, an important supply and communication center, situated along the Dniester. Soviet troops forced crossings of the Dniester and seized several bridgeheads in mid-April, fighting to expand them for the remainder of the month. German counterattacks, overextended supply lines, and unfavorable weather forced a halt to the Soviet offensive on 6 May.

== Background, planning and preparation ==
The Odessa Offensive continued the Red Army's drive towards the Romanian border in the spring of 1944, following the advance to the Southern Bug during the Bereznegovatoye–Snigirevka offensive that began on 6 March. In the latter, Rodion Malinovsky's 3rd Ukrainian Front failed to destroy the German 6th Army, but secured bridgeheads that it spent much of the second half of March fighting to consolidate and expand. These bridgeheads provided a staging ground for the offensive. Retreating behind the Southern Bug in muddy rasputitsa conditions, the German troops suffered heavy personnel and equipment losses.

For the Odessa Offensive, the 3rd Ukrainian Front was assigned to rout the German 6th Army, capture the strategic Black Sea port of Odessa, and advance to the Soviet-Romanian border on the Dniester. Stavka, the Soviet high command, predicted that the front would take at least ten days to take the port. The three southernmost armies and the cavalry-mechanized group of the front were assigned to besiege Odessa itself. Vasily Chuikov's 8th Guards Army and Ivan Shlemin's 6th Army were given the mission of encircling Odessa from the northwest and west, advancing behind Issa Pliyev's spearhead Cavalry-Mechanized Group. The group had been the vanguard of the Soviet advance in the previous months and was adapted to operations in rasputitsa conditions. To their south, Vyacheslav Tsvetayev's 5th Shock Army was assigned to attack Odessa frontally from the east.

The three armies to the north on the right wing: Nikolai Gagen's 57th Army, Mikhail Sharokhin's 37th Army, and Vasily Glagolev's 46th Army, supported by Aleksey Akhmanov's 23rd Tank Corps, were tasked with pushing the German troops back to the and over the Dniester, in cooperation with the 5th and 7th Guards Armies on the left wing of Ivan Konev's 2nd Ukrainian Front, attacking towards the Romanian border, and securing the right flank of the front. The 37th and 46th Armies, advancing behind the Cavalry-Mechanized Group, were also assigned to capture the transportation hub of Razdelnaya to the northwest of Odessa and cut off the German line of retreat toward the Dniester. The drive towards Razdelnaya slowed both armies down in their attempts to reach the Dniester.

The collapse of Army Group South and Army Group A in Ukraine in March 1944 resulted in major changes in German upper levels of command. At the end of the month, commanders of both army groups, Generalfeldmarschall Erich von Manstein and Generalfeldmarschall Ewald von Kleist, were dismissed by Hitler. Their respective replacements were Generalfeldmarschall Walter Model and General der Gebirgstruppen Ferdinand Schörner. At the start of April 1944, both army groups were reorganized into Army Group North Ukraine and Army Group South Ukraine. Among the high-ranking General Officers dismissed by Hitler was the commander of the 6th Army, Generaloberst Karl-Adolf Hollidt, who was replaced by General der Artillerie Maximilian de Angelis on 21 March 1944. Up until then, Angelis commanded the XXXXIV Army Corps of the 6th Army.

== Comparison of forces ==
=== Soviet ===
The 3rd Ukrainian Front included seven field armies: the 57th, 37th, 46th, 28th, 6th, 8th Guards and 5th Shock Armies. The 57th Army, 37th, and 46th Armies included nine rifle divisions in three rifle corps each. The Cavalry-Mechanized Group combined Pliyev's own 4th Guards Cavalry Corps with three horse cavalry divisions, three separate tank regiments, with artillery support, and Trofim Tanaschishin's 4th Guards Mechanized Corps with three mechanized brigades, and one tank brigade with artillery support. Despite its heavy losses in the previous months, the group still fielded over 250 tanks and self-propelled guns. The 4th Guards Cavalry Corps had 17,532 men, 13,008 horses, 64 tanks, eleven self-propelled guns, and 122 guns on 27 March, while the 4th Guards Mechanized Corps had 4,935 men, 84 tanks and fourteen self-propelled guns.

The 8th Guards Army included ten rifle divisions as the strongest Soviet army in the operation, with 55,682 men, of which 38,175 were in infantry units, 1,148 machine guns, 458 mortars, 352 field guns, 240 howitzers, and 119 anti-tank guns on 1 April. The 6th Army, with 20,000 men, 320 machine guns, 60 mortars, 32 anti-tank guns, and 35 field guns on 31 March, was smaller than the others with six rifle divisions in two rifle corps, and no other combat support troops. Malinovsky planned to pull the 6th Army out of action after the fall of Odessa and use it as a front reserve. The 5th Shock Army included eight rifle divisions and a fortified region. After months of combat, the infantry strength of the front had been significantly reduced, and due to the German destruction of infrastructure during their retreat, the flow of replacements was interrupted. Instead, the front relied on the conscription of men in liberated territories for replacements.

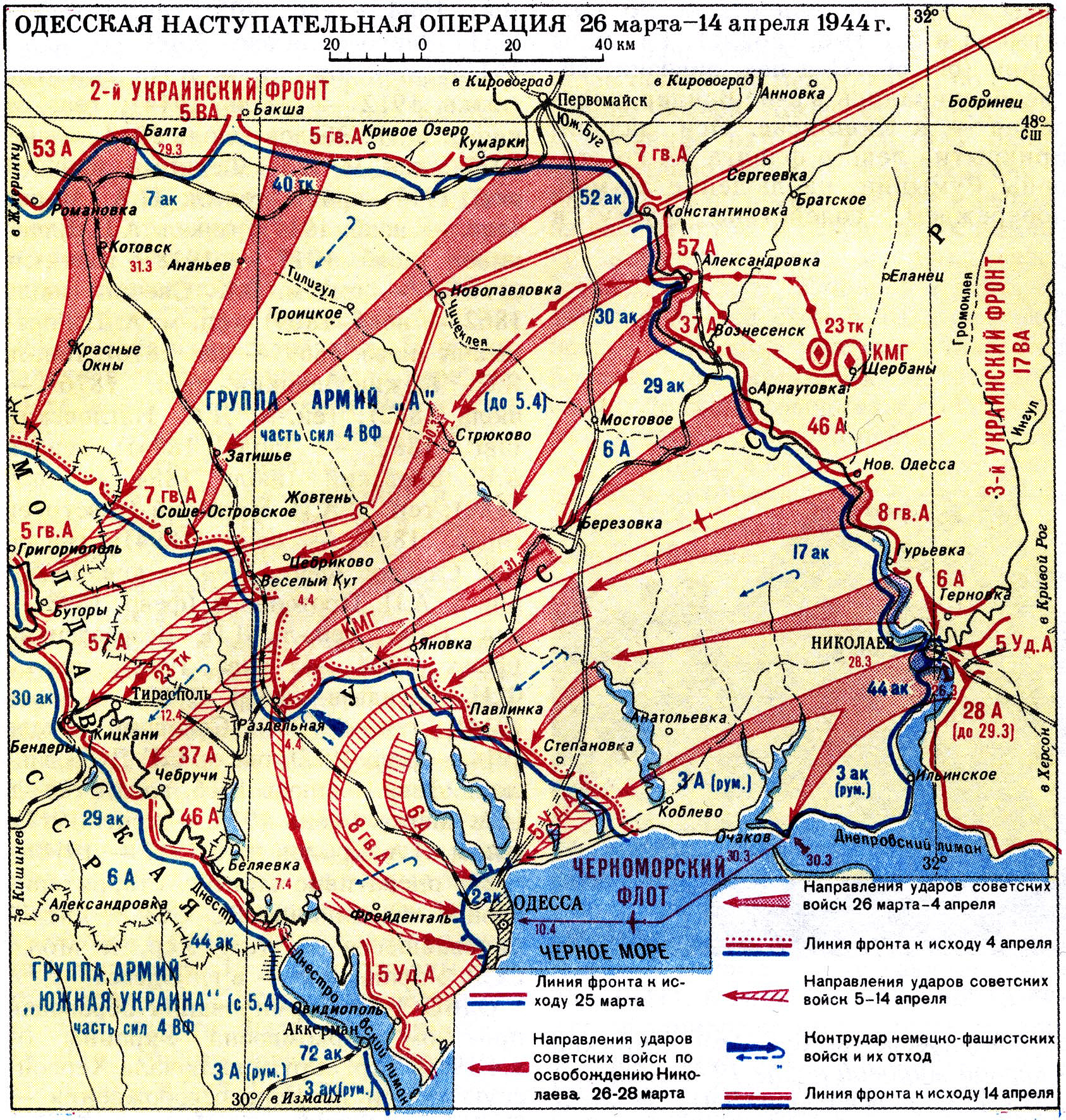
Map of the offensive

For the offensive, the 3rd Ukrainian Front included 57 rifle and three cavalry divisions, a tank corps and a mechanized corps. According to a postwar history, these totaled 470,000 men, 12,678 guns and mortars, 435 tanks and self-propelled guns. The front was supported by the 17th Air Army with 436 combat aircraft. The 3rd Ukrainian Front's report on the operation, drawn up in August 1944, provides figures for the operational strength of the front on 28 March: 243,074 men, 42,512 submachine guns, 4,824 machine guns, and 344 tanks and self-propelled guns (only counting those in the 23rd Tank Corps and Cavalry-Mechanized Group), 2,112 mortars, 1,616 field guns, and 781 anti-aircraft guns. The 28th Army included five rifle divisions, a fortified region, and the 2nd Guards Mechanized Corps with 29 tanks. The 28th Army fielded 33,671 men, 1,102 machine guns, 382 mortars, and 444 guns of all types.

The 28th Tank Corps fielded 77 T-34s and 21 SU-85s on 28 March. On the eve of the offensive, by 27 March, the 4th Guards Mechanized Corps received new armor: 80 T-34s and thirteen SU-76s. On 29 March it had one KV-1, four SU-152, 102 T-34, one SU-85, fifteen SU-76, three Valentine Mk 3, two M4A2 tanks and self-propelled guns with a reported total of 130 tanks and self-propelled guns. The 128th, 134th and 151st Tank Regiments (equipped with Lend-Lease tanks) and the 1815th Self-Propelled Artillery Regiment were part of the 4th Guards Cavalry Corps. By 30 March the 128th Tank Regiment had eleven M4A2, ten Mk 3, the 134th Tank Regiment nine M4A2 and nine Mk 3, and the 151st Tank Regiment nine M4A2 and ten Mk 3, while the 1815th SP Regiment had fifteen SU-76. At the same time, the cavalry corps reserve also included eleven M4A2 and ten Mk 3 for a total of 94 tanks in the corps. The mobile group of Colonel Vladimir Krasnogolovy, attached to the 23rd Tank Corps, included the 52nd Tank Regiment, 3rd Guards Separate Motorcycle Regiment, 53rd Motorcycle Regiment and 67th Separate Motorcycle Battalion. On 26 March the 52nd Tank Regiment had nine T-34, eight T-70, two SU-76, the 3rd Guards Motorcycle Regiment five T-34 and three T-70, and the 53rd Motorcycle Regiment two T-70 and six T-60.

Order of battle: 3rd Ukrainian Front (General armii Rodion Malinovsky) on 1 April
Higher headquarters	Commander	Corps	Units
5th Shock Army	General-polkovnik Vyacheslav Tsvetayev	10th Guards Rifle	86th Guards, 109th Guards, and 320th Rifle Divisions
		37th Rifle	49th Guards, 108th Guards, 248th, and 416th Rifle Divisions
		None	295th Rifle Division, 1st Guards Fortified Region
6th Army	General-leytenant Ivan Shlemin	34th Guards Rifle	59th Guards, 61st Guards and 243rd Rifle Divisions
		66th Rifle	203rd, 244th, and 333rd Rifle Divisions
8th Guards Army	General-polkovnik Vasily Chuikov	4th Guards Rifle	35th Guards, 47th Guards, and 57th Guards Rifle Divisions
		28th Guards Rifle	39th Guards, 79th Guards, and 88th Guards Rifle Divisions
		29th Guards Rifle	27th Guards, 74th Guards, and 82nd Guards Rifle Divisions
		None	152nd Rifle Division
37th Army	General-leytenant Mikhail Sharokhin	6th Guards Rifle	20th Guards and 195th Rifle Divisions
		57th Rifle	58th Guards, 92nd Guards, and 228th Rifle Divisions
		82nd Rifle	10th Guards Airborne, 28th Guards and 188th Rifle Divisions
		None	15th Guards Rifle Division
46th Army	General-leytenant Vasily Glagolev	31st Guards Rifle	4th, 34th, and 40th Guards Rifle Divisions
		32nd Rifle	60th Guards, 259th and 266th Rifle Divisions
		34th Rifle	236th and 394th Rifle
		None	353rd Rifle Division
57th Army	General-leytenant Mikhail Sharokhin	9th Rifle	118th, 230th, and 301st Rifle Divisions
		64th Rifle	73rd Guards, 19th, and 52nd Rifle Divisions
		68th Rifle	93rd, 113th, and 223rd Rifle Divisions
Cavalry-Mechanized Group	General-leytenant Issa Pliyev	4th Guards Cavalry	9th Guards, 10th Guards, and 30th Cavalry Divisions, 128th, 134th, 151st Tank Regiments
		4th Guards Mechanized	13th, 14th, and 15th Guards Mechanized, and 36th Guards Tank Brigades, 37th, 38th, 39th Guards Tank Regiments
		None	5th Separate Guards Motor Rifle Brigade, 3rd Anti-Aircraft Artillery Division
17th Air Army	General-leytenant Vladimir Sudets	1st Mixed Aviation	5th Guards Assault and 288th Fighter Aviation Divisions
		9th Mixed Aviation	305th and 306th Assault, and 295th Fighter Aviation Divisions
		None	244th Bomber, 262nd Night Bomber Aviation Divisions
Front units		23rd Tank	3rd, 39th, and 135th Tank Brigades, 56th Motor Rifle Brigade
		None	7th and 9th Breakthrough Artillery Divisions, 4th, 22nd and 35th Anti-Aircraft Artillery Divisions

=== German ===
As a result of the costly and difficult withdrawal in conditions of rasputitsa during the Bereznegovatoye-Snigirevka offensive in the previous month, all divisions of the 6th Army were heavily depleted and exhausted by the end of March 1944. 6th Army High Command rated the combat value of all their divisions as level 4 (Kampfwert IV), meaning that they were fit for limited defensive operations only.

Regarding the condition of the 6th Army at the start of April 1944, its commander, General der Artillerie Maximilian de Angelis, wrote a detailed report, describing how badly worn it was:

The heavy defensive battles of the last weeks meant the hardest test of endurance for the army. The troops, mentally and physically overstrained by the dismounted movements under partly most difficult conditions, had to give their last. Only by draconian performance demands the set goals could be reached. Due to further high personnel and material losses, the majority of army divisions are physically, numerically and materially worn-out.
The health condition of the troops had deteriorated considerably due to the change of weather during the last days of March, since the troops had to fight and march continuously under unfavorable operational conditions. An improvement is only now gradually taking place, although the high number of foot and cold diseases, severe lice and the general physical exhaustion must not be overlooked.
In addition to the great shortage of officers, there were other serious combat losses. Due to the decrease in the number and quality of officers and non-commissioned officers with experience in the East, the internal structure of the troops in the worn-out divisions was loosened more and more. The few available front-line officers and a few proven NCOs bore the brunt of the last battles.
[…]
In the battles of the second half of March and the first days of April, the bulk of the army's divisions lost a considerable part of the weapons and equipment they had carried until then in the breakthrough battles with reversed fronts under the most difficult terrain and road conditions. The great shortage of weapons of all kinds, motor vehicles (especially prime movers) and communications equipment has resulted in extraordinary difficulties in combat management and supply. The number of motor vehicles has fallen to such an extent that individual divisions have only a few essential command vehicles and a very small number of trucks. All command and reporting traffic must be directed by dispatch riders during movement.
[...]
The supply of the divisions with divisional means is possible only at the shortest distance, since the supply troops are almost without motorized transport capacity. Although it has been possible to mitigate the loss of motor vehicles to some extent by switching to horse-drawn vehicles, this has reduced mobility not only on the march but also in combat.
[...]
The poor condition of the clothing, especially the footwear, has a psychologically detrimental effect and impairs the mobility and operational capability of the troops. The footwear is torn, the clothing ragged.
[...]
The high losses of officers, non-commissioned officers and old enlisted men has further degraded the level of training. During the withdrawal battles, with their constant strain on all forces, the level of training could not be promoted. The young officer replacements, often used as company commanders as a result of the battle situation, did not meet the requirements during crises.

By the end of March 1944, as a result of the Nikopol-Krivoy Rog offensive (February) and subsequent Bereznegovatoye-Snigirevka offensive (March), numerous battered and worn-out divisions of the 6th Army had to be disbanded or sent to the OB West area in France for rebuilding.

Table. 6th Army divisions lost in March 1944
Unit	Date of disbandment or withdrawal	Notes
62nd Infantry Division	Disbanded on 13 March 1944	Remnants of the division used to form Corps-Detachment F
123rd Infantry Division	Disbanded on 1 March 1944	Remnants of the division used to form Corps-Detachment F
125th Infantry Division	Disbanded on 13 March 1944	Remnants of the division absorbed by the 302nd Infantry Division
387th Infantry Division	Disbanded on 13 March 1944	Remnants absorbed by various units
9th Panzer Division	Order of 25 March 1944, ordering the worn-out division to move to the OB West area in Carcassonne (France) for rebuilding. First elements arrived on 12 April 1944.	Rebuilt in France, by absorbing the 155th Reserve Panzer Division
16th Panzergrenadier Division	Order of 25 March 1944, ordering the worn-out division to move to the OB West area, northwest of Paris, for rebuilding. First elements arrived on 12 April 1944.	Rebuilt and reorganized into the 116th Panzer Division in France, by absorbing the 179th Reserve Panzer Division.

In addition, at the end of March 1944, the 6th Army had to send its four infantry and three panzer divisions to reinforce the northern neighbor, 8th Army, which was heavily battered during the Uman-Botoshany offensive and was compelled to conduct a wide-ranging withdrawal. In exchange, it received the 2nd Parachute Division from the 8th Army, which was weak after sustaining heavy losses during the retreat from Uman area.

Thus, as a result of the heavy losses in withdrawals of March 1944, coupled with the transfer of numerous divisions to the 8th Army, the overall strength of the 6th Army declined from 286,297 men on 1 March 1944 to 188,551 men on 1 April 1944.

Order of battle of the 6th Army. Status: 30 March 1944
Corps	Divisions under subordination
LII Army Corps	Kampfgruppe 2nd Parachute Division, 320th Infantry Division, Corps-Detachment A, 76th Infantry Division
XXX Army Corps	Kampfgruppe 15th Infantry Division, 384th Infantry Division, 257th Infantry Division
XXIX Army Corps	Kampfgruppe 97th Jäger Division, Kampfgruppe 3rd Mountain Division, Kampfgruppe 335th Infantry Division, 258th Infantry Division, Kampfgruppe 17th Infantry Division, 294th Infantry Division
XXXXIV Army Corps	9th Infantry Division, Kampfgruppe 306th Infantry Division, Kampfgruppe 304th Infantry Division, Kampfgruppe 302nd Infantry Division
XVII Army Corps	153rd Field Training Division
+ numerous artillery, engineer (Pioniere), bridge-building (Brückenbau), anti-tank and Sturmgeschütz general headquarters (GHQ) combat units of the army and subordinated corps'.

The 1st Mobile Infantry Division of the Slovak Expeditionary Army Group was located in the army rear area, for security and occupation duties.

Order of battle of the Romanian 3rd Army. Status: 1 April 1944
Corps	Divisions under subordination
LXXII Army Corps (German, for special use)	Kampfgruppe 5th Luftwaffe Field Division (German), Romanian 4th/24th Infantry Division, Romanian 14th Infantry Division
III Army Corps (Romanian)	Romanian 15th Infantry Division, Romanian 21st Infantry Division

In terms of personnel strength, the divisions of the 6th Army were heavily understrength by the start of April 1944, having more or less a strength of around 50% in relation to their authorized strength. The following table below shows the strength of numerous divisions of the 6th Army, as reported by the army's management department (Führungsabteilung).

Note that when it comes to the 'Actual Strength' (Iststärke), it refers to all personnel that are part of the unit's composition. Thus, it includes divisional personnel that might be on leave, temporarily attached to other units or absent for whatever other reason. It also includes wounded and sick personnel that are recovering in unit's area of operations and are expected to return to service within the space of 8 weeks. Therefore, Iststärke is not an indicator of the unit's actual combat capabilities or that this number were all combat troops. It is used for planning and organizational purposes, calculating the unit's overall strength based on how many personnel in total, combat and non-combat, were part of its establishment. Correspondingly, the 'Shortages' section show how many men in total the division was short of, based on its authorized strength.

Personnel strength and shortages of the divisions of the 6th Army. Status: 1 April 1944
Unit	Authorized strength	Actual strength	Shortages
17th Infantry Division	11,000	4,000	7,000
76th Infantry Division	12,695	6,433	6,262
258th Infantry Division	12,987	7,974	5,013
302nd Infantry Division	13,303	10,964	2,339
304th Infantry Division	13,120	9,083	4,037
335th Infantry Division	12,644	5,130	7,514
384th Infantry Division	12,810	7,473	5,337
97th Jäger Division	16,087	9,905	6,182
3rd Mountain Division	17,765	8,921	8,844
Corps-Detachment A	13,883	11,834	2,049
153rd Field Training Division	16,225	5,534	10,691
2nd Parachute Division	11,980	2,415	9,565

As a result of continuous heavy combat and difficult retreats in adverse weather conditions, the strength of actual combat units in German divisions saw a tremendous decline. In this regard, the losses fell disproportionately on the infantry units and their experienced commanders and soldiers, whose level of training and experience could not be replaced, as highlighted in Angelis' report on the condition of the 6th Army at the start of April 1944. The incessant combat in rasputitsa also meant that troops had no time to tend to their hygienic needs, clothing was badly worn (especially footwear), while hot meal was a rarity. As a result, a sizable number of soldiers were put out of action due to various type of sickness (severe lice infestation, intestinal disorders, trench foot, frostbite etc.). All of this meant that the actual infantry combat strength in the German division was just a fraction of what it was supposed to be.

Infantry combat strength (Infanterie Gefechtsstärke) of 6th Army divIsions. Status: 25 March 1944
Unit	Strength
2nd Parachute Division	Not available for this date
320th Infantry Division	1,313
Corps-Detachment A	2,146
76th Infantry Division	1,257
15th Infantry Division	939
384th Infantry Division	1,402
257th Infantry Division	2,023
97th Jäger Division	1,199
3rd Mountain Division	1,074
335th Infantry Division	1,071
258th Infantry Division	1,847
17th Infantry Division	589
294th Infantry Division	Not available for this date
9th Infantry Division	1,528
306th Infantry Division	1,219
304th Infantry Division	1,317
302nd Infantry Division	1,405
153rd Field Training Division	Not available for this date

== Offensive ==
=== Southern Bug bridgeheads and liberation of Nikolayev ===
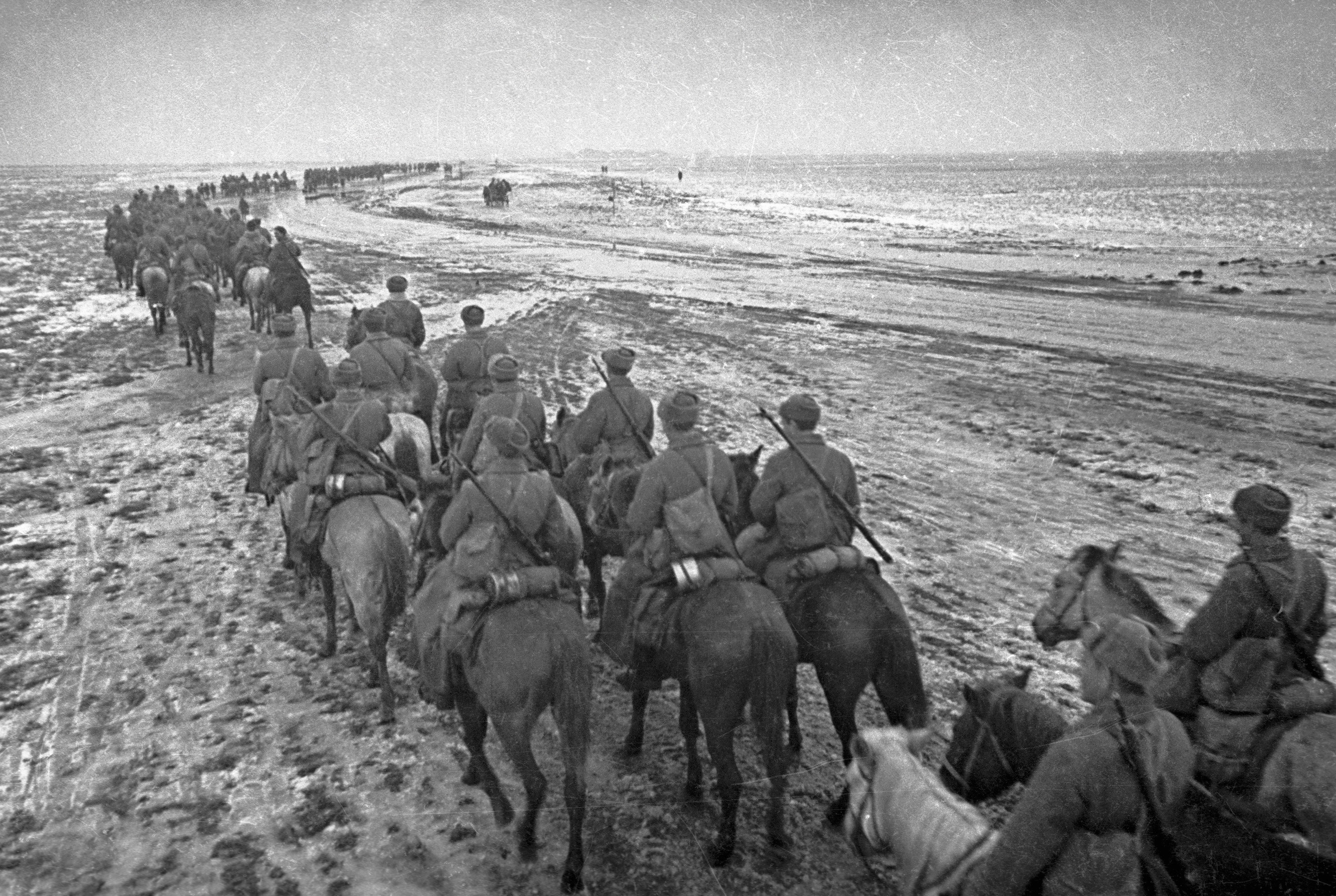
A unit of the 4th Guards Cavalry Corps on the march, 1 April

The offensive began on 26 March. The right wing of the front fought to expand its previously captured bridgeheads at Konstantinovka and Voznesensk on the right bank of the Southern Bug on 27 March and during that night. Overcoming German resistance, the 57th and 37th Armies expanded the bridgeheads to a width of up to 45 kilometers and from 4 to 25 kilometers in depth by the end of 28 March. In reaction to the advances on the right wing, Malinovsky quickly adjusted the plan for the operation, and shifted the Cavalry-Mechanized Group and 23rd Tank Corps from the 46th Army sector northeast of Novaya Odessa to the sector of the 57th and 37th Armies, to develop the gains on the right wing. On 28 March the Cavalry-Mechanized Group received the order to concentrate in the area of Aleksandrovka and Voznesensk by the morning of the next day, cross on the bridges of the 37th Army, and decisively advance in the general direction of Moldavka, Mostovoye, and Berezovka. The group was ordered to reach Berezovka by 30 March and then continue the offensive towards Razdelnaya. The 23rd Tank Corps was ordered to concentrate in the area of Trikraty, Aleksandrovka, and Voronovka by the morning of the morning of 28 March and to be prepared to cross in the area of Aleksandrovka on the night of 29 March, to attack towards Tiraspol.

During this time, the 6th, 5th Shock and 28th Armies fought in the area of the major port and shipbuilding center of Nikolayev. A 67-man detachment commanded by Senior Lieutenant Konstantin Olshansky of the 384th Separate Naval Infantry Battalion of the Black Sea Fleet was landed by fishing boats near Nikolayev on the night of 25–26 March. The majority of the detachment was wiped out and the action became celebrated in Soviet propaganda, with all 67 men being made Heroes of the Soviet Union. On the night of 27–28 March the 61st Guards and 243rd Rifle Divisions from the 6th Army crossed the Ingul under fire by improvised means and entered Nikolayev from the north at 03:00 on 28 March. The breakthrough of these divisions destabilized the German defenses, and the Soviet troops reached the city center by 04:00. Simultaneously, the 130th Rifle Division of the 5th Shock Army crossed the Ingul and together with the other divisions of the army, entered the city from the east, as the 28th Army advanced on Nikolayev from the south. The Soviet troops fully cleared the city of resistance by the morning of 28 March. After the capture of Nikolayev, the 28th Army headquarters was withdrawn to the Reserve of the Supreme High Command, transferring its five rifle divisions, the 10th Guards Rifle Corps headquarters and the 1st Guards Fortified Region to the 5th Shock Army. In turn the 5th Shock Army transferred its five smallest rifle divisions and the 3rd Guards Rifle Corps headquarters to the 28th Army. The 2nd Guards Mechanized Corps of the 28th Army was withdrawn to the front reserve for rebuilding.

The German 5th Luftwaffe Field Division, and the 302nd, and 304th Infantry Divisions, holding Nikolayev, were thrown back to the western bank of the Southern Bug. The retreating German troops partially blew up the bridge over the river near Varvarovka. Elements of the 37th Rifle Corps of the 5th Shock Army began preparing to cross the river in this area. By the morning of 29 March the Soviet units crossed the river, capturing Varvarovka. Simultaneously the repair of the bridge to allow equipment and heavy weapons to cross began. Seven sapper and engineer battalions worked to restore the bridge while under fire during the night of 29 March. In ten hours the more than a kilometer long bridge was repaired. During 29 March almost all the regimental and divisional artillery of the 37th Rifle Corps crossed to the opposite bank with the heavy artillery following on the next day.

=== Crossing of the Southern Bug and Tilligul ===
The fall of Nikolayev and the advance of the 57th and 37th Armies threatened both flanks of the German 6th Army, forcing it to begin a hasty retreat across the entire front. The 17th Air Army launched airstrikes against the retreating columns. The ground attack aircraft of the 5th Guards and 306th Assault Aviation Divisions were especially active in this. The 288th and 295th Fighter Aviation Divisions covered the crossing of the Southern Bug near Aleksandrovka by the 23rd Tank Corps and Cavalry-Mechanized Group. The crossing was delayed by being forced to use one pontoon bridge with a 30-ton weight limit, and was only completed on the morning of 30 March. Crossing to the western bank of the Southern Bug, the 23rd Tank Corps and Cavalry-Mechanized Group followed the 57th and 37th Armies, which reached the Tiligul on 29 March. The 23rd Tank Corps entered the battle in the area of Stryukovo in the first half of 30 March, and the Cavalry-Mechanized Group on the night of 30–31 March in the area of Berezovka. By 1 April 23 Tank Corps had 28 T-34 and fifteen SU-85 remaining, its strength rising to 41 T-34s and seventeen SU-85 on 2 April.

Meanwhile, the 5th Shock Army advanced along the Black Sea coast on the front's left wing, with its 1st Guards Fortified Region and the forward detachment of the 295th Rifle Division liberating Ochakov assisted by a landing of naval infantry from the Black Sea Fleet on 30 March. Seeking to avoid encirclement, the German troops sought to delay the advance of the 57th and 37th Armies and the 23rd Tank Corps and Cavalry-Mechanized Group on the Tiligul. The retreating troops occupied prepared fortifications that in some places dominated the left bank of the river. The swampy banks of the river and its marshy bottom proved an obstacle for the Soviet advance. Despite the German resistance, the 37th Army and Cavalry-Mechanized Group forced the crossing of the river on 31 March and dislodged the defenders from the heights of the right bank. During the crossing of the Tiligul that morning, 4th Guards Mechanized Corps commander Trofim Tanaschishin was killed in a German bombing raid, and was succeeded by corps chief of staff Vladimir Zhdanov. The corps suffered significant losses from the bombing raids, which it reported to consist of groups of eight to twenty aircraft repeatedly attacking throughout the day. Its combat journal complained that "our fighter cover only appeared in the second half of the day and they passively patrolled north of Berezovka." German aviation continued to make itself felt as the corps reported a bombing raid in the afternoon of 1 April consisting of 50 Ju 87 dive bombers that burned out nineteen T-34s and wrecked two.

The Soviet advance from the Tiligul became more difficult, as rain had turned the roads to mud. German air groups of 30 to 40 aircraft systematically bombed the frontline troops, while the Soviet infantry and mechanized forces experienced ammunition and fuel shortages. To address these logistical issues, transport aircraft from the 17th Air Army delivered supplies to the troops, conducting 60 sorties between 1 and 3 April that delivered 85 tons of supplies.

=== Capture of Razdelnaya and German counterattack ===
The Soviet advance continued despite these obstacles and on 4 April the Cavalry-Mechanized Group and vanguard of the 37th Army captured Razdelnaya, with the 4th Guards Cavalry Corps attacking on horseback supported by the tanks of the 4th Guards Mechanized Corps. The German 258th and 335th Infantry Divisions hastily retreated from the station, where Soviet troops captured significant quantities of materiel, including 37 engines and over 900 railcars. The capture of Razdelnaya, 42 miles northwest of Odessa, cut the Odessa–Tiraspol rail line and split the 6th Army in half. The western part, the LII and XXX Army Corps with half of the divisions on the left of the XXIX Army Corps (the 15th, 76th, 257th, 320th, and 384th Infantry Divisions, 97th Light Division, Corps Detachment A with kampfgruppes of three divisions, the 278th and 286th Assault Gun Brigades) retreated towards Tiraspol in the face of the advance of the 37th and 57th Armies and the 23rd Tank Corps. Meanwhile, the eastern part, the remaining half of the XXIX Army Corps and the XXXXIV and LXXII Army Corps (the 3rd Mountain, 9th, 17th, 258th, 294th, 302nd, 306th and 335th Infantry Divisions, 93rd and 560th Panzer Battalions, 243rd and 259th Assault Gun Brigades) as well as the Romanian 3rd Army Corps (5th Luftwaffe Field, 304th Infantry Divisions, the Romanian 21st and 24th Romanian Infantry Divisions), were isolated east of Razdelnaya or faced encirclement around Odessa itself. After Razdelnaya fell, Malinovsky tasked Pliyev with rushing to the south to cut off the German retreat from Odessa, and tasked the 8th Guards and 6th Armies with surrounding the port from the northwest while the 5th Shock Army attacked frontally from the east.

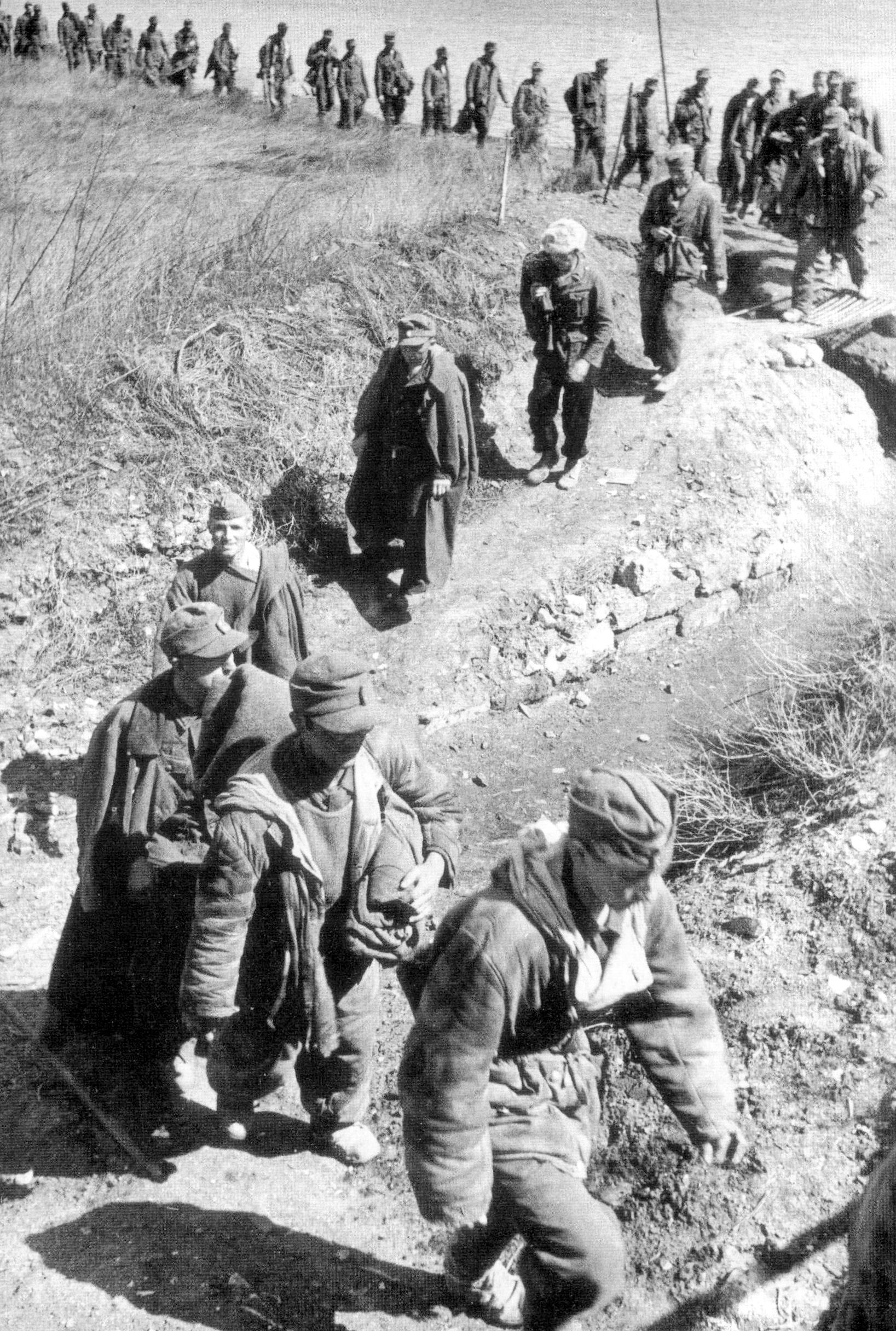
German soldiers march into captivity in the Odessa area, April 1944

After the Soviet breakthrough, the 3rd Mountain, 17th, 335th, and 294th Infantry Divisions of XXIX Army Corps east of Razdelnaya made a hasty retreat west to avoid being surrounded, through the Soviet screen left behind by the Cavalry-Mechanized Group and 8th Guards Army, facing east. Just how chaotic the German situation was at the time is described by captured German officer, belonging to the badly battered 3rd Mountain Division, who was captured by Pliyev's forces. The officer reported:

In some areas there is terrible confusion; panic reigns. Everything is mixed up. Many commanders, overwhelmed by fear, gave orders to destroy gasoline, food and ammunition stocks. For example, the commander of the supply company, Leutnant Lax, destroyed everything, setting it all ablaze. His men had already fled.

The situation for the Axis troops in Odessa worsened on 5 April when the Cavalry-Mechanized Group, pushing ahead of the infantry for the first time in the offensive, reached Strasburg on the northern coast of the Dniester estuary with its 30th Cavalry Division. Elements of XXIX Army Corps consisting of the assault gun brigades and two Panzer battalions in this area were pushed across the Dniester in the Belyayevka area, 25 miles west of Odessa. The advance of the Cavalry-Mechanized Group blocked the retreat of the German troops east of the Dniester, with Pliyev's forces placing strongpoints at major road junctions.

Perceiving the danger, the 6th Army prepared a counterattack. In the second half of the day on 5 April and on the night of 5–6 April the 3rd Mountain, 17th, 258th, 294th, and 335th Infantry Divisions under the command of the XXIX Army Corps commander began assembling southeast of Razdelnaya. The 97th Light and 257th Infantry Divisions of XXX Army Corps concentrated to the southwest of Razdelnaya. The German counterattack planned for both of these concentrations to attack towards Razdelnaya and join forces with each other there. The XXIX Army Corps attacked from the area southeast of Razdelnaya against the 82nd Rifle Corps of the 37th Army on the morning of 6 April. In intense fighting, the German troops pushed back the 82nd Rifle Corps, reached the crossings over the Kuchurugan river and linked up with the German troops southwest of Razdelnaya. Other troops from the 37th Army moved up to the Razdelnaya area, and in constant fighting the Soviet troops split the counterattacking German troops in half late on 7 April.

The majority of the XXIX Army Corps managed to reach new intermediate defensive lines east of the Dniester defending the eastern approaches to Grigoriopol and Tiraspol. The XXXXIV Army Corps with the 302nd, 306th, 9th, and 304th Infantry Divisions proved more unfortunate in attempting to break through Pliyev's troops and the rear guard of the 8th Guards Army, being pushed back to the south and southeast of Razdelnaya. The divisions of the corps lost their cohesion and broke into regimental and smaller groups, suffering heavy losses in men and equipment as they fled towards the western bank of the Dniester. A significant amount of troops were able to escape thanks to Pliyev's and Chuikov's focus on Odessa instead of the retreating the German troops.

The difficult withdrawals and breakouts from potential encirclement in the first week of April took a heavy toll on the German infantry and the equipment of the German troops. As a result of heavy losses, the infantry combat strength of divisions of the 6th Army saw a tremendous decline.

Infantry combat strength (Infanterie Gefechtsstärke) of 6th Army divisions. Status: 8 April 1944. Comparison of the strength 2 weeks ago
Unit	Strength on 8 April 1944	Strength on 25 March 1944	%
2nd Parachute Division	433	Not available	-
320th Infantry Division	954	1,313	-27%
Corps-Detachment A	1,335	2,146	-38%
76th Infantry Division	1,306	1,257	+4%
15th Infantry Division	830	939	-12%
384th Infantry Division	754	1,402	-46%
257th Infantry Division	1,406	2,023	-30%
97th Jäger Division	988	1,199	-18%
3rd Mountain Division	211	1,074	-80%
335th Infantry Division	699	1,071	-35%
258th Infantry Division	370	1,847	-80%
17th Infantry Division	1,105	589	+47%
294th Infantry Division	794	Not available	-
9th Infantry Division	Not available due to chaotic situation	1,528	-
306th Infantry Division	Not available due to chaotic situation	1,219	-
304th Infantry Division	Not available due to chaotic situation	1,317	-
302nd Infantry Division	Not available due to chaotic situation	1,405	-
153rd Field Training Division	Not available	Not available	-

In addition to heavy troop losses, 6th Army divisions sustained heavy material losses in motor vehicles, weaponry, as well as losing various repair facilities and warehouses with ammo, rations and fuel. In the postwar studies about the supply difficulties, produced for the Historical Division of U.S. Army by a committee of German officers, headed by Generalmajor Alfred Toppe, who was the Generalquartiermeister of the German Heer, the withdrawals of the 8th Army (Uman-Botoshany Offensive) and 6th Army (Odessa Offensive) from the Southern Bug to the Dniester are described:

Sixth and Eighth Armies' defensive withdrawals between the [Southern] Bug and Dnestr were particularly costly to the troops with regard to their losses of personnel and equipment. Snow storms mixed with rain had mired the roads and the terrain, so that movements were rendered very difficult. Among the equipment which had to be left behind and fell into enemy hands were numerous motor vehicles unable to advance any farther on the muddy roads, guns whose horse-teams were completely debilitated, as well as stocks of ammunition, fuel, rations and spare parts of every description for the evacuation of which no transportation was available.

=== Liberation of Odessa ===
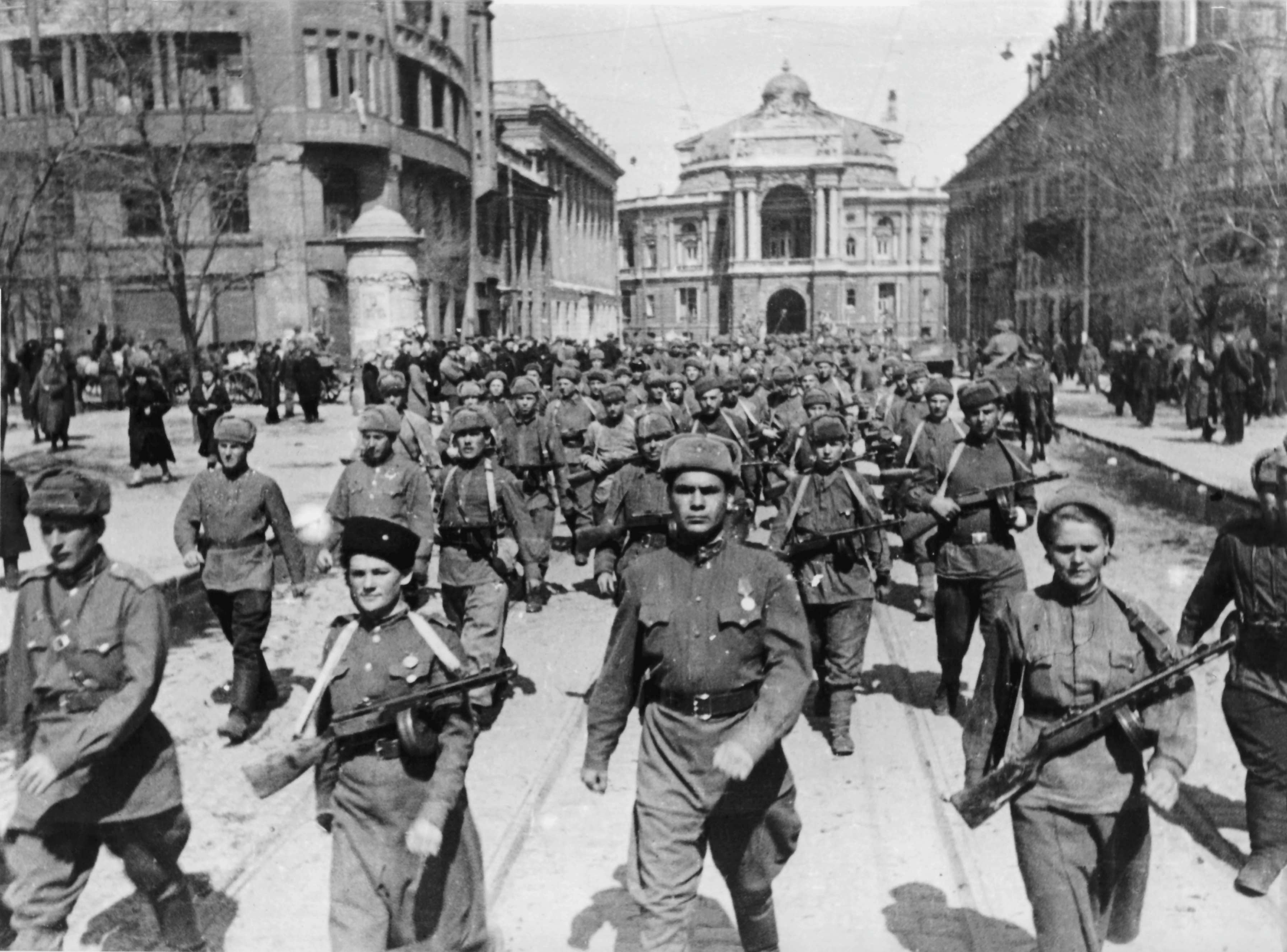
Soviet soldiers march on the streets of Odessa on 10 April 1944.

At the same time, the center and left wing of the front approached closer to Odessa, defended by LXXII Army Corps and part of the XXXXIV Army corps, with elements of six divisions and separate units. These forces used fortifications left over from 1941, and numerous estuaries, flooded ravines and gullies hampered the Soviet advance. By the evening of 9 April, the situation around Odessa was as follows: the Cavalry-Mechanized Group, having captured Belyayevka and Mayaki on 7 April, continued intense fighting in the area, repulsing the attacks of troops retreating from near Odessa. The 10th Guards Cavalry Division captured Skury and began fighting for Ovidiopol. The 8th Guards Army, flanking Odessa from the northwest, reached the line of Freydental, Peterstal, and Dalnik with its main forces. The Soviet 6th Army reached the approaches to the city from the northwest and fought on the line of Dalnik, Usatovo and Kuyalnik. The 5th Shock Army captured Sortirovochnaya, Kuyalnik and Peresyp at 18:00 on 9 April, and its vanguard entered the northern suburbs of Odessa at 22:00. The 86th Guards, 248th, 320th, and 416th Rifle Divisions were first to enter the battle for the city. In preparation for night fighting in a major city, commanders and headquarters down to the regimental level received city maps, assault groups were tasked with securing important objectives and main roads, and local guides selected. Soviet artillery took firing positions in the evening, bringing all approaches to the city under fire from the seaside. The aviation of the front also flew sorties against the approaches to the city. As a result, the German troops in Odessa were almost completely encircled by the evening of 9 April, with the only remaining crossing over the Dniester estuary being in the area of Ovidiopol.

That night, on 9–10 April, the vanguards of the 8th Guards and 6th Armies and the Cavalry-Mechanized Group came up from the northwest and west against the interior defenses of the port. Facing encirclement, the remainder of the defending LXXII Army Corps panicked, mounting only desultory resistance as they sought to break out to the west. The retreating columns came under Soviet air attack while the 262nd Night Bomber and 244th Bomber Aviation Divisions targeted ships in the port and the 9th Mixed Aviation Corps attacked transports in the Dniester estuary. Local partisans began attacking overnight and were credited with preventing the destruction of infrastructure by the retreating German troops. The city center fell at 10:00 on 10 April. After the fall of Odessa, the Soviet 6th and 5th Shock Armies were withdrawn to the second echelon of the front, while the other armies continued to advance to the west.

=== Dniester bridgeheads ===
The retreat of the LXXII Army Corps was as disorganized as that of the XXXIV Army Corps, involving what a German account described as a scene "reminiscent of Stalingrad" with traffic jams on the Dniester and troops lacking clothing and supplies. By the end of the offensive, the 6th Army established new defenses to the east of and on the Dniester, but Soviet troops captured several bridgeheads, the largest at Tiraspol, taken on 12 April 1944.

The condition of the German forces in the Tiraspol bridgehead was particularly bad, as noted in the war diary (Kriegstagebuch) of Army Group South Ukraine, entry for 11 April 1944. On the evening of that day, the German forces were to abandon this bridgehead and withdraw to the western bank of the Dniester. The most hard-pressed was the 'Wittmann Group' (Gruppe Wittmann) named after the commander of the 3rd Mountain Division Generalmajor August Wittmann, which consisted of the 294th Infantry Division, remnants of the 17th, 335th, 258th Infantry Divisions and 3rd Mountain Division. In a long-distance call at 10.15 a.m. on that day, the Chief of the General Staff of the 6th Army informed the 1st General Staff Officer of Army Group South Ukraine about the situation in the army. The war diary of the army group notes the following about this:

The Tiraspol bridgehead, which is to be abandoned tonight, is doubly occupied. The Chief of the General Staff of the 6th Army then turns to the condition of the troops. This is catastrophic. The infantry regiments of the divisions of the Wittmann Group have an average [combat] strength of 200-250 men with 5 machine guns and 2-4 mortars. The majority of the people have torn uniforms, no footwear and are no longer fit to march. Some of the people are completely without willpower. Help must therefore be provided more quickly, first and foremost with footwear and clothing, then with weapons and ammunition. If this does not succeed, a large part of the divisions will no longer be fit for combat. As far as rations and fuel are concerned, things are generally at acceptable levels. The 1st General Staff officer [Army Group South Ukraine] replied that the army group's supply situation was more serious than ever before due to the rail situation. He could therefore not promise that effective help would be provided immediately. However, the army group would of course do everything possible.

At 8.15 p.m. on 11 April 1944, the Chief of the General Staff of the 6th Army informed the Chief of the General Staff of Luftflotte 4 by telephone of the seriousness of the army's supply situation and asked whether additional aircraft could be made available for supply flights. The Luftflotte 4 responded that it was already using all available aircraft to supply the army group- there were no more, especially now that Crimea had to be evacuated. As the 6th Army's traffic situation was still bad, the supply remained a 'very serious' issue. Therefore, as one of the radical ways to economize on available resources, it was decided to reduce the bread rations to 200 grams per day for soldiers. In addition, the ammunition situation was causing 'great concern' for the formations of the 6th Army. The ammunition shortages were especially serious for the XXIX Army Corps, as it retreated behind the Dniester at the end of 11 April 1944 to the area south and southwest of Tiraspol- it was noted that if the XXIX Army Corps did not receive sufficient infantry and artillery ammunition on the next day, its divisions would no longer be fit for combat.

Meanwhile, in the area north of Tiraspol, the Soviet 57th Army, together with the attached 23rd Tank Corps, continued to advance. In the area of Ploskoye, the spearhead of the 23rd Tank Corps found itself temporarily encircled on 10 April and fought there until the Soviet infantry came up on the next day. The 57th Army and its attached 23rd Tank Corps advanced up to 20 kilometers to the west on 11 April and on 12 April reached the east bank of the Dniester near Parcani, 6 kilometers northwest of Tiraspol. At noon that day the 93rd Rifle Division of the 68th Rifle Corps forced a crossing of the Dniester in the area of Butory and Shiryany. At 18:00, taking advantage of the success of the 93rd, the 113th Rifle Division also forced a crossing of the river. Two other corps of the 57th Army, the 9th and 64th Rifle, also forced crossings of the Dniester in their zones and captured small bridgeheads on its western bank. On the night of 10–11 April, the 37th Army broke German resistance and with its 57th Rifle Corps (the 92nd Guards and 228th Rifle Divisions) and the 188th Rifle Division of the 82nd Rifle Corps entered the southeastern outskirts of Tiraspol. The city was cleared by Soviet forces on the night of 11–12 April. The 6th Guards Rifle Corps reached the Dniester to the south of Tiraspol on 11 April. The 20th Guards Rifle Division with two regiments forced a crossing of the Dniester already on the evening of 11 April and captured a bridgehead two kilometers wide and 1.5 kilometers deep in the area west of Slobodzeya Moldavanskaya, four kilometers southwest of Tiraspol. By the end of 12 April the bridgehead was significantly widened with four rifle divisions crossing to it. The 46th Army reached the east bank of the Dniester by the end of 11 April in the area to the south of Chobruchi, and on 12 April its reconnaissance units forced a crossing of the Dniester three kilometers southeast of Raskayevtsy.

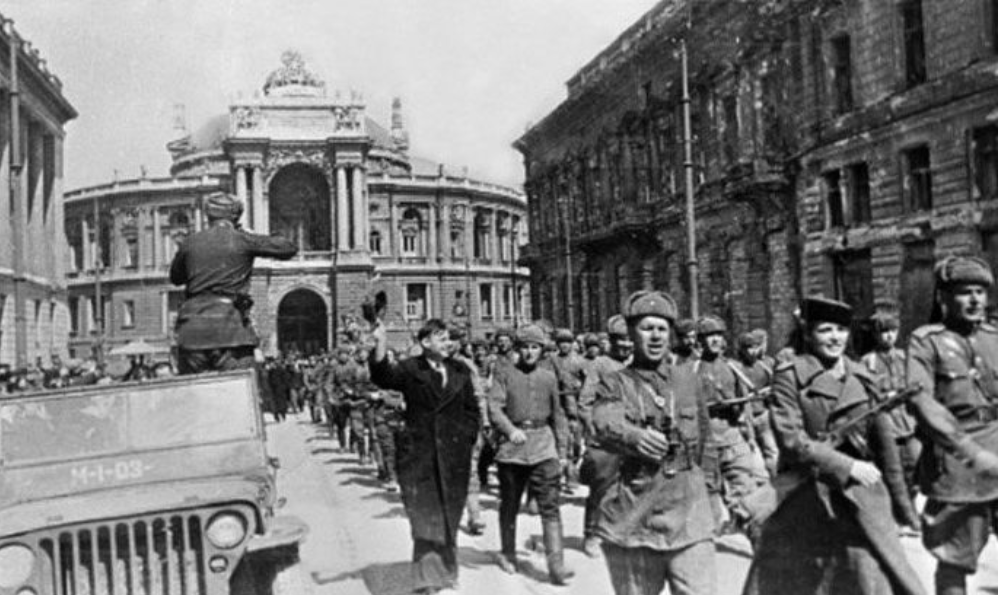
Red Army in Odessa, 10 April 1944.

The 8th Guards Army and the Cavalry-Mechanized Group fought in intense battles with Axis troops retreating from Odessa, who sought to hold the fortifications in front of the bridge in the Ovidiopol area, in order keep the crossing to the west bank of the Dniester estuary open. The 10th Guards and 30th Cavalry Divisions were forced to retreat north of Ovidiopol by the attacks of the retreating Axis troops on 10 April. The 10th Guards Cavalry Division, facing an extreme shortage of ammunition, was forced to retreat in the Neiburg area, where it was encircled by the retreating German troops and suffered losses. By 11:00 the division retreated to the Kalagleya area, where it came under attack again from the retreating German columns. The division repulsed the German attack on Kalagleya by dark that day and breaking out through the German troops, withdrew to Belyayevka by 06:00 on 11 April. In the fighting 10th Guards Cavalry Division commander Colonel Sergey Shevchuk was reported killed along with both division deputy commanders and its artillery commander, but was in fact captured, and executed by German troops in the final weeks of the war.

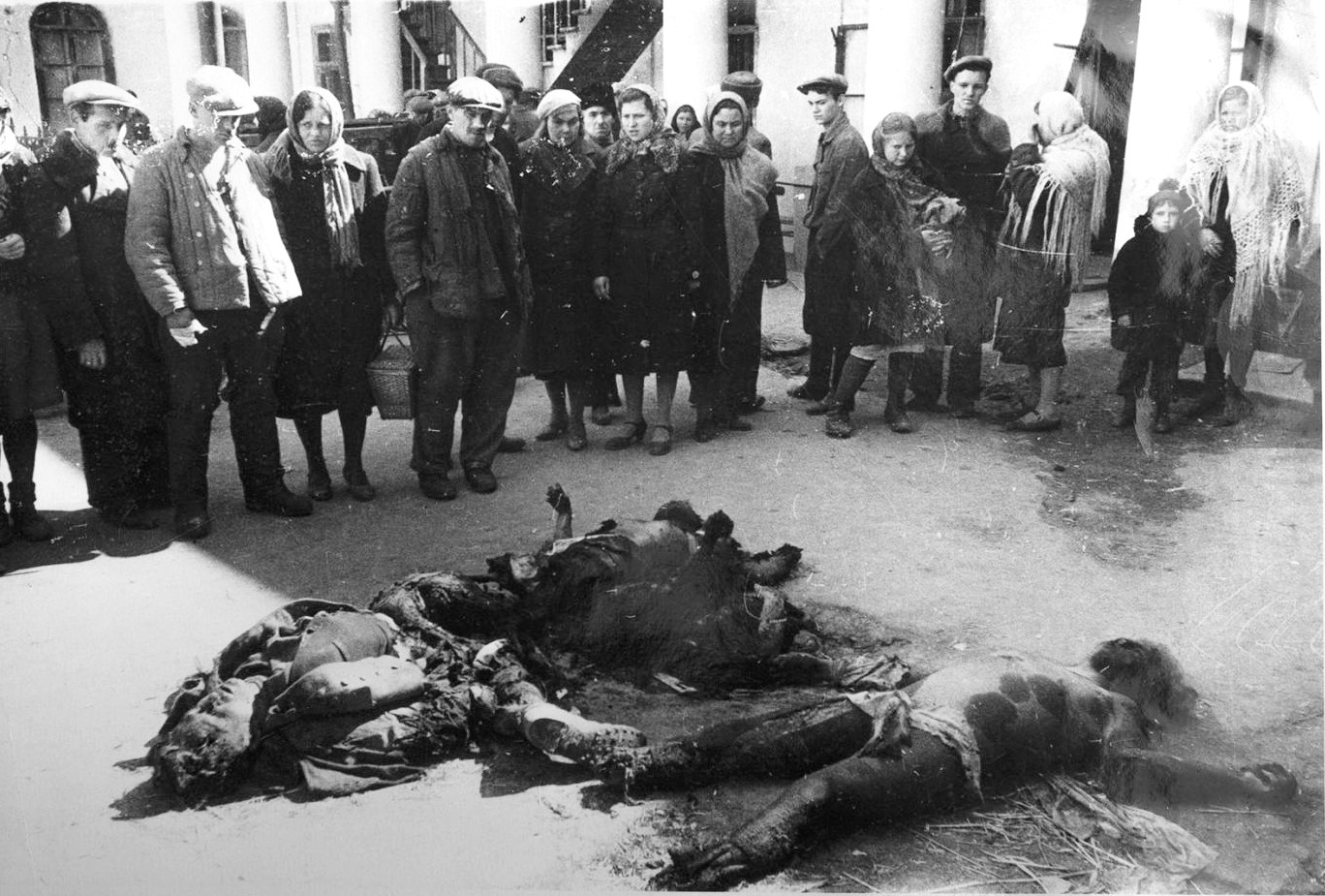
Remains of Soviet citizens killed by German troops in Odessa

On the night of 10–11 April and during that day the 17th Air Army launched airstrikes, targeting the railroad junction of Akkerman and the crossings near Ovidiopol. The 8th Guards Army fully cleared the coast of the Dniester estuary on 14 April and on the night of 14–15 April its 74th Guards Rifle Division forced a crossing of the Dniester at Ilyichevka, two kilometers southeast of Belyayevka.

However, the Soviet attempts to cross the Dniester in force were thwarted by bad weather and German resistance, forcing a halt to the offensive on 14 April. The Soviet attacks resumed five days later, in the Dniester bridgehead battles.

The difficult retreat to the Dniester, as well as the breakout from the potential trap in the Odessa area, had further decimated the infantry strength of the 6th Army divisions. Only in few cases, as a result of the retreat to the western bank of the Dniester, did the infantry strength of some divisions have notably improved. As of 17 April 1944, the infantry combat strength of the 6th Army divisions was the following.

Infantry combat strength (Infanterie Gefechtsstärke) of 6th Army divIsions. Status: 17 April 1944.
Unit	Strength on 17 April 1944	Strength on 8 April 1944	%	Notes
2nd Parachute Division	242	433	-44%	Remnants withdrawn to Germany for rebuilding in May 1944.
17th Infantry Division	545	1,105	-51%	
Corps-Detachment F	1,301	-	-	Recently formed unit out of the remnants of the disbanded 62nd and 123rd Infantry Divisions.
294th Infantry Division	535	794	-33%	
320th Infantry Division	482	954	-49%	
Corps-Detachment A	1,247	1,335	-7%	
13th Panzer Division	1,400	-	-	Recently arrived from the 8th Army, after the end of the Uman–Botoșani offensive.
384th Infantry Division	470	754	-38%	
3rd Mountain Division	524	211	+148%	
257th Infantry Division	1,597	1,406	+14%	
15th Infantry Division	911	830	+10%	
97th Jäger Division	1,134	988	+15%	
14th Panzer Division	1,248	-	-	Recently arrived from the 8th Army, after the end of the Uman–Botoșani offensive.
9th Infantry Division	1,000	1,528 (25 March)	-35%	8 April strength report unavailable due to chaotic situation. Most likely, the shortfall for that date was even greater and by 17 April the division was slightly refitted.
302nd Infantry Division	1,000	1,405 (25 March)	-29%	8 April strength report unavailable due to chaotic situation. Most likely, the shortfall for that date was even greater and by 17 April the division was slightly refitted.
258th Infantry Division	1,065	370	+188%	
76th Infantry Division	717	1,306	-45%	
153rd Field Training Division	1,447	Not available	-	
335th Infantry Division	420	699	-39%	
306th Infantry Division	976	1,219 (25 March)	-20%	8 April strength report unavailable due to chaotic situation. Most likely, the shortfall for that date was even greater and by 17 April the division was slightly refitted.
15th Romanian Infantry Division	8,490	-	-	Temporarily re-subordinated from the Romanian 3rd Army to the 6th Army.
4th/24th Romanian Infantry Division	2,170	-	-	Temporarily re-subordinated from the Romanian 3rd Army to the 6th Army.
5th Luftwaffe Field Division	352	-	-	Re-subordinated from the Romanian 3rd Army to the 6th Army. Disbanded in May 1944.
304th Infantry Division	1,015	1,317 (25 March)	-23%	8 April strength report unavailable due to chaotic situation. Most likely, the shortfall for that date was even greater and by 17 April the division was slightly refitted.

In the 22 April 1944 report, assessing the overall situation of the 6th Army after its withdrawal behind the Dniester, the army commander General der Artillerie Angelis reported:

The situation of the 6th Army is still characterized by the constraint of having to fight with a rather small amount of ammunition. If, nevertheless, it was possible to prevent the enemy from crossing the Dniester with significant forces, it is to the credit of the tenaciously fighting troops who are ready to make sacrifices.
As already reported, it is of great importance to replace in time the considerable losses of men and equipment suffered in the continuous battles against [numerically] far superior enemy.
The enemy is severely hampered by the obstruction to the flow of the Dniester, especially the current high water. The supply of the enemy, which has not yet been smooth, should become gradually more favorable as a result of the steadily improving railroad situation- the [railway] line to Razdelnaya is [expected] to be ready for operation by 25 April. Judging by the shelling, the enemy's ammunition situation is already much better than ours.
All parts of the army are making every effort to restore and strengthen their combat capability. These efforts of the troops are limited by the still severely delayed supply in all areas, especially in combat personnel.

== Results ==
The offensive resulted in the defeat of the German 6th Army, with its April 1944 casualties numbering 4,672 killed, 16,205 wounded, 6,014 missing, and 6,479 sick for a total of 33,370. Seven of its divisions lost more than half their strength. Although the 6th Army situation have stabilized along the Dniester, in the course of May 1944 it still sustained 2,888 killed, 10,195 wounded, 681 missing and 4,675 sick, for a total of 18,439 casualties.

After the conclusion of this offensive, the heavily damaged 5th Luftwaffe Field Division, whose infantry combat strength (Infanterie Gefechtsstärke) had shrunk to a mere 352 combat-ready soldiers on 17 April 1944, was ordered to be disbanded on 12 May 1944 by the 6th Army High Command, with remnants of the division to be absorbed by the 76th Infantry Division and other units. As of 1 May 1944, the total actual strength (Iststärke) of the division, including its supply, administrative and medical units, was just 2,241 officers, civilian officials, non-commissioned officers and enlisted men in total, while total personnel shortages for the same date amounted to a staggering 9,647 personnel of all ranks, out of a total authorized strength of 11,888 personnel.

Similarly, the remnants of the badly battered 2nd Parachute Division, whose infantry combat strength was reduced to only 242 soldiers on 17 April 1944, received order on 6 May 1944 to prepare for withdrawal from the Eastern Front back to Germany for rebuilding. After completing local operations near the Dniester, the Kampfgruppe 2nd Parachute Division began departing from the Kishinev to Germany on 11 May 1944. Just how shattered this division was is illustrated by the fact that it arrived to the Eastern Front from Italy in the autumn of 1943 aboard 75 trains but left in only 2.

With the German front stabilizing in the second half of April 1944 along the Dniester, the situation of the 6th Army began to gradually improve, although its units were still heavily depleted in personnel and materiel. Regarding the situation and condition of the 6th Army on 1 May 1944, its commander, General der Artillerie Maximilian de Angelis, reported the following:

The consolidation of the front has had a beneficial effect on the troops of all divisions of the 6th Army in every respect, especially in terms of attitude and will to fight. The mental strain on the troops caused by the withdrawal movements and battles has subsided.
Temporary calm at some combat sections and the possibility of temporarily detaching individual divisions from the front as an army reserve and at the same time refitting them, have strengthened the internal structure of the force.
The level of training could be promoted only insignificantly as a result of the heavy defensive battles and the constant tension of almost all forces.
High losses continued to drain the core of good troops.
Most of the replacements are inadequately trained (usually only with rifles, without training in heavy weapons and close-range tank combat). The young officer replacements do not meet the requirements in difficult combat situations.
Further losses of officers, especially battle-hardened ones, have considerably increased the difficulties for combat leadership and training resulting from the previous shortages. Sufficient supplies of fresh, capable and spirited officers and NCOs continue to be required. Previous replacements have still not covered the losses that have occurred. However, with the arrival of the announced replacements, the situation is expected to improve.
The state of health has largely improved with the onset of the warm season and stable conditions.
The great shortage of weapons of all kinds (especially machine guns and mortars), motor vehicles (especially prime movers) and communications equipment creates considerable difficulties for command, combat, training, and supply.
The stock of motor vehicles is so small that some divisions have only a few essential command vehicles and a very small stock of trucks. In addition, the condition of the remaining vehicles is inadequate due to obsolescence, overuse and lack of spare parts.
Supplying the divisions with divisional resources is only possible over very short distances, as their supply troops [Nachschubtruppen] have almost no motorized transport space. Although the lack of motor vehicles has been partially alleviated by switching to horse-drawn vehicles, this has considerably reduced mobility not only on the march but also in combat.
Average mobility of the army divisions:
a) Infantry divisions: with horse-drawn parts at 80%, with motorized parts 15-20%.
b) Panzer divisions: at 60%.
[...]
The clothing is badly worn, especially the footwear is torn off. With the clothing supplied recently, only the most extreme emergencies could be remedied. The supply of new clothing, especially footwear, is becoming increasingly necessary.

Total Soviet casualties for the operation have not been publicly revealed, but archival documents reveal the following figures: the 8th Guards Army recorded casualties of 600 killed and 2,191 wounded between 1 and 10 April, 280 killed and 1,182 wounded between 10 and 20 April, and 186 killed and 558 wounded between 20 and 30 April, for a total of 1,066 killed and 3,931 wounded during the entire month. The army's casualties for the month of March were much heavier: 3,086 killed and 12,881 wounded. The 5th Shock Army recorded casualties of 740 killed, 2,394 wounded, and 1,071 sick, and three missing for a total of 4,208 casualties during the month of April. The 28th Army recorded casualties of 900 killed and 3,506 wounded between 20 and 28 March. For the period between 21 March and 12 April, the 37th Army recorded casualties of 563 killed and 1,276 wounded. The 4th Guards Cavalry Corps recorded total losses of 31 tanks (out of the 64 it began the offensive with) between 1 and 15 April. Personnel losses were 642 killed and 1,589 wounded while 4,590 horses were killed and 266 wounded.

During the operation, the 3rd Ukrainian Front lost a total of 102 tanks and eighteen self-propelled guns destroyed and 48 tanks and seventeen self-propelled guns damaged. Soviet tankers criticized the M4A2 Shermans and Valentine Mk IIIs for their poor cross-country mobility and noted that a lack of track replacements made their usage "inexpedient." The 4th Guards Cavalry Corps' 151st Tank Regiment suffered eleven breakdowns of its Lend-Lease tanks compared to five combat losses, out of twenty that it began the offensive with. The regiment's after-action report further noted a lack of assistance from higher headquarters regarding the disruption of fuel and ammunition supply by the rasputitsa conditions, forcing it to rely on captured German fuel stockpiles, while its march was hindered by insufficient training of drivers for night movements.

Advancing 180 kilometers, Soviet troops liberated several major settlements, including the important Black Sea Ports of Nikolayev, Odessa and Ochakov. Having advanced to the lower Dniester and secured bridgeheads on the opposite bank, the 3rd Ukrainian Front was able to create conditions for operations that aimed to retake Moldavia and advance deep into Romania and the Balkans. The advance of the Red Army in the Odessa region worsened the situation of the Axis troops cut off in Crimea, assisting their quick destruction in the Crimean offensive.

The expansion of the Dniester bridgeheads was slow and difficult in view of overextended supply lines, difficult terrain, spring floods and rains, which were further exacerbated by German scorched earth tactics. The German forces, having received urgently needed personnel replacements and withdrawn to a more defensible positions, launched several counter-attacks in late April and early May, in order to weaken the Soviet stance on the western bank of the Dniester. These attacks inflicted heavy losses on Soviet units and ended their continuous three-month offensives. On 6 May 1944, Stavka ordered the 3rd Ukrainian Front, together with the 2nd Ukrainian Front (by that time bogged down in the Târgu Frumos area), to go on the defensive. Afterwards, throughout most of the summer of 1944 the front along the Dniester will stay calm. It will stay that way until 20 August 1944, when a new major offensive by the 2nd and 3rd Ukrainian Fronts will collapse Axis front and the Soviets will resume their drive towards the Balkans.

Soviet air operations were hindered by bad weather, the distance of the 17th Air Army bases from the frontline, and shortages of fuel and bombs, the transport of which was made difficult by impassable roads. Until 8 April Soviet ground attack aircraft "practically did not operate," according to the front's report on the operation, and flight operations were restricted to "one or two pairs" of fighters covering the mobile units of the front. With the arrival of better weather conditions from 10 April Soviet aviation became significantly more active. A total of 2,026 sorties (1,622 day and 414 night) were flown between 28 March and 14 April.
