= LXXII Army Corps =

OKW battle regiment

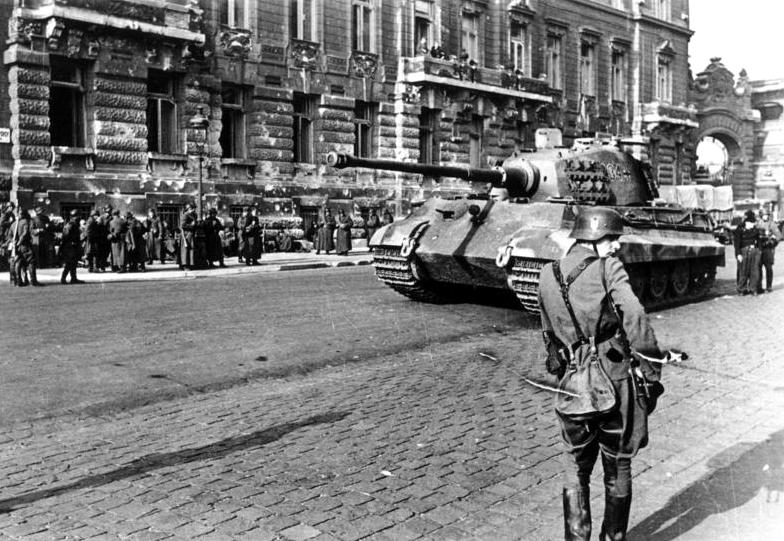

The LXXII Army Corps (German: LXXII. Armeekorps) was an army corps of the German Wehrmacht during World War II. The corps was formed in February 1944. Before October 1944, it carried the designation z. b. V., marking it as a corps 'for special deployment'.

== History ==
The LXXII Army Corps z. b. V. was formed on 13 February 1944 in southern Russia. It was initially subordinate to the 6th Army (subordinate to Army Group A, later Army Group South Ukraine) in the Galați area in Moldavia. It was moved to the 3rd Romanian Army under Army Group South Ukraine in May 1944, but then transferred back to 6th Army in August, to the army group reserves in September, and once again to the 6th Army, now under Army Group South, in October.

Beginning in October 1944, the designation z. b. V. was dropped and the corps subsequently referred to as LXXII Army Corps.

In December 1944, the LXXII Army Corps was assigned to the 3rd Hungarian Army under Army Group South, before being transferred back to the 6th Army in January 1945. After subordination to the 8th Army between February and April 1945, it was transferred to the newly formed Army Group Ostmark. Under Army Group Ostmark, the LXXII Army Corps surrendered at the end of the war in May 1945.

== Structure ==
Organizational structure of the LXXII (72nd) Army Corps of the German Wehrmacht, 1944 – 1945
Year	Date	Commander	Subordinate units	Army	Army Group	Operational area
1944	3 March	Sigismund von Förster	370th Infantry, 5th Luftwaffe Field Division	6th Army	Army Group A	Galați
1944	15 April	Sigismund von Förster	304th Infantry, 5th LFD	6th Army	Army Group South Ukraine	Galați
1944	15 May	Sigismund von Förster	153rd Infantry, 15th Romanian, 21st Romanian	3rd Romanian Army	Army Group South Ukraine	Galați
1944	15 June	Sigismund von Förster	None (in reserves)	3rd Romanian Army	Army Group South Ukraine	Galați
1944	15 July	Sigismund von Förster	None (in reserves)	3rd Romanian Army	Army Group South Ukraine	Galați
1944	31 August	Sigismund von Förster	None (in reserves)	6th Army	Army Group South Ukraine	Galați
1944	September	Georg Zwade	None (in reserves)	directly under army group	Army Group South Ukraine	Inactive
1944	13 October	August Schmidt	76th Infantry	6th Army	Army Group South	Southern Hungary
1944	5 November	August Schmidt	76th Infantry, 25th Hungarian	6th Army	Army Group South	Southern Hungary
1944	26 November	August Schmidt	271st Infantry, 1st Hungarian Cavalry	3rd Hungarian Army	Army Group South	Southern Hungary
1944	31 December	August Schmidt	2nd Hungarian Armored, 3rd Panzer, 6th Panzer	6th Army	Army Group South	Southern Hungary
1945	19 February	August Schmidt	8th Jäger, 101st Jäger	8th Army	Army Group South	Hungary
1945	1 March	August Schmidt	8th Jäger, Kampfgruppe Kaiser	8th Army	Army Group South	Hungary (Esztergom)
1945	12 April	August Schmidt	46th Infantry, 182nd Infantry, 271st Infantry, 711th Infantry	8th Army	Army Group South	Hungary (Esztergom)
1945	5 May	Werner Schmidt-Hammer	78th Infantry, 254th Infantry, 304th Infantry	1st Panzer Army	Army Group Ostmark	Moravia

== Noteworthy individuals ==
- Sigismund von Förster, corps commander of LXXII Army Corps z.b.V. (22 July 1943 – 25 September 1944).
- Georg Zwade, corps commander of LXXII Army Corps z.b.V. (25 September 1944 – October 1944).
- August Schmidt, corps commander of LXXII Army Corps z.b.V. and LXXII Army Corps (October 1944 – April 1945).
- Anton Grasser, corps commander of LXXII Army Corps (6. – 20. April 1945)
- Werner Schmidt-Hammer, corps commander of LXXII Army Corps (April 1945 – May 1945).
