= 153rd Grenadier Division =

Division No. 153 153rd Reserve Division 153rd Field Training Division 153rd Grenadier Division
- Division Nr. 153; 153. Reserve-Division; 153. Feldausbildungs-Division; 153. Grenadier-Division
- Active: December 1939 – May 1945
- Country: Nazi Germany
- Branch: Army (Wehrmacht)
- Type: Infantry
- Size: Division

The 153rd Grenadier Division (German: 153. Grenadier-Division), sometimes referred to as 153rd Infantry Division (153. Infanterie-Division) in Wehrmacht documents, was an infantry division of the German Heer during World War II. It was founded under the name Division No. 153 (Division Nr. 153), and also carried the names Commander of Reserve Troops III (Kommandeur der Ersatztruppen III), 153rd Reserve Division (153. Reserve-Division), and 153rd Field Training Division (153. Feldausbildungs-Division). It was first deployed in August 1939, received its first redesignation in December 1939, was renamed twice more in 1942, was destroyed by forces of the Soviet Union twice and then redeployed, and was redesignated a final time in 1945.

== Operational history ==
Formed on 26 August 1939 during German mobilization and shortly before the Invasion of Poland, the unit that would become the 153rd division was initially designated Commander of Reserve Troops III and served as the training division and administrative body for recruits from Wehrkreis III (Berlin). This unit was dubbed Division No. 153 on 12 December 1939. Division No. 153 continued the previous function of Commander of Reserve Troops III. The reserve regiments that were part of the division included, but were not limited to, Infantry Reserve Regiment 23 'Potsdam', Infantry Reserve Regiment 76 'Brandenburg', Infantry Reserve Regiment 218 'Berlin-Spandau', Motorized Infantry Reserve Regiment 83 'Eberswalde', and others. (Note: Example list taken from March 1940.)

The division was redesignated 153rd Reserve Division (153. Reserve-Division) on 11 September 1942. Until this point, the division had remained in Wehrkreis III, but was now prepared to be sent to the front. The remaining replacements were moved for additional training to 463rd Division and the fighting units of the 153rd then transferred to Ukraine. This division was then soon renamed again as part of an order given on 10 December 1942. Parts of the division that were stationed in Crimea were transferred to the 258th Infantry Division, the remainders were merged to become 153rd Field Training Division (153. Feldausbildungs-Division). This division was first ready for operations, specifically the training of recruits for other divisions on the Eastern Front, on 15 January 1943.

The 153rd Field Training Division, which had been assigned to XXXXIX Mountain Corps under 17th Army in October 1943, was destroyed by Red Army forces in March 1944.

The 153rd Field Training Division was redeployed for a second iteration using its surviving staff officers in April under command of XXIX Army Corps (6th Army) and then, starting in May, LXXII Army Corps (Third Romanian Army), before being destroyed once more in August 1944 in Romania after having briefly served under XXIX Army Corps again. The inadequately equipped 153rd had been forced into action and called up from the army group's reserves by the commanding general of XXX Army Corps, Georg-Wilhelm Postel, when Postel found himself unable to close the gaps left by retreating Romanian units. The 153rd division was unable to stop the Soviet onslaught, and was quickly defeated as the Soviets continued their advance on XXX Army Corps' right flank as well as their frontal assault against Postel's units. On 20 August, the XXIX Army Corps was ordered to form a new front west of the Seret river. It was given 153rd Field Training Division for this task, along with 13th Panzer (which at this point had no tanks left) and 10th Panzergrenadier Divisions and Panzerverband Braun. At this point, the 153rd Division was so depleted that it could not even muster a regiment-sized force. On 24 August, the Soviet 2nd and 3rd Ukrainian Fronts captured Huși, crossed the Prut river, and subsequently trapped the German 6th Army, along with great amounts of German divisions, (Note: Other trapped German units besides the 153rd included the following: Infantry Divisions: 9th, 15th, 62nd, 106th, 161st, 257th, 258th, 282nd, 294th, 302nd, 306th, 335th, 376th, 384th. Other divisions: 10th Panzergrenadier, 13th Panzer. 7 assault gun brigades. Various command units.) between Prut and Dniester.

Some parts of the division's second iteration fled to Bulgaria, but were then delivered into Soviet captivity by the Bulgarian leadership. The division's commanding general, Friedrich Bayer, was among those delivered to the Red Army, on 11 September 1944.

The 153rd Field Training Division was deployed for a third iteration in October 1944 in the German rear area. On 14 December 1944, orders were given to refit the third iteration of the 153rd Field Training Division for frontline combat. The division was fighting in Hungary at the time. There, it got trapped alongside the 1st and 23rd Panzer Divisions between the Danube and Lake Balaton. The 153rd Field Training Division was eventually overrun at Székesfehérvár and only parts of the division escaped.

These remnants renamed 153. Grenadier-Division in February 1945. This division remained in combat in the Německý Brod pocket until the end of the war. It was assigned to XXIX Army Corps in April and then ended the war under command of XXXXIX Army Corps, both then part of 1st Panzer Army under Army Group Vistula. On 8 May, the day of German surrender, the 153rd Grenadier Division was captured by Soviet forces at Německý Brod.

== Noteworthy individuals ==
- Curt Schönheinz, divisional commander (August 1939 to December 1939).
- Otto Schröder, divisional commander (December 1939 to May 1942).
- Diether von Böhm-Bezing, divisional commander (May 1942 to December 1942).
- René de l'Homme de Courbière, divisional commander (January 1943 to June 1943).
- Kurt Gerok, divisional commander (June 1943 to June 1944).
- Friedrich Bayer, divisional commander (from June 1944 to August 1944). Taken prisoner by Bulgarian forces when attempting to enter Bulgaria while fleeing Romania. Later delivered into Soviet captivity.
