= 1st Mobile Infantry Division (Slovak Republic) =

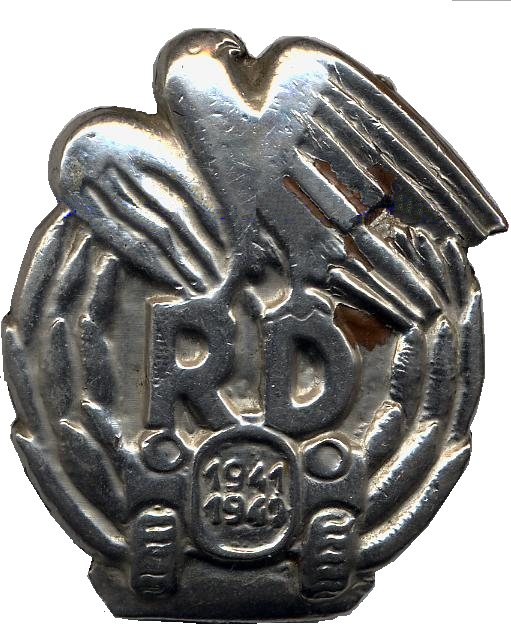
- Active: 23 June 1941 – 30 October 1943; 1944 – March 1945
- Country: Slovakia
- Branch: Slovak Expeditionary Army Group
- Role: Infantry
- Engagements: World War II: Operation Barbarossa; Battle of Lypovec; Battle of Rostov (1941); Battle of the Caucasus; Kuban bridgehead; Melitopol offensive; Odessa Offensive

The 1st Mobile Infantry Division also known as the Slovak Fast Division and as the Rapid Division, was an infantry division of the Slovak Expeditionary Army Group that fought on the Eastern Front during World War II.

== History ==
The division was formed as the Rapid Group on 23 June 1941. A month later on 23 July 1941, the Rapid Group was reorganized into a division after the Battle of Lypovec. During the Battle of the Caucasus, the division was encircled at Saratovskaya, but managed to escape to the Kuban bridgehead. However, the division was forced to leave behind all their heavy equipment and weapons in order to escape. The division was then destroyed during the Melitopol offensive with 2,600 soldiers of the division becoming prisoners of war. The division was reformed in early 1944. The reformed division was used to protect communication lines. The division participated in the Odessa Offensive. The division surrendered to Soviet forces in March 1945.
