= Hans de Salengre-Drabbe =

- Born: 21 October 1894
- Died: 25 August 1944 (aged 49); Tiraspol, Moldavian SSR, Soviet Union
- Military career
- Allegiance: Nazi Germany
- Branch: Army
- Service years: 1914–1944
- Rank: Generalleutnant
- Commands: 384th Infantry Division
- Conflicts: Jassy–Kishinev Offensive †
- Awards: Knight's Cross of the Iron Cross

Hans de Salengre-Drabbe (21 October 1894 – 25 August 1944) was a general in the Wehrmacht of Nazi Germany during World War II who commanded the 384th Infantry Division. He was a recipient of the Knight's Cross of the Iron Cross. Salengre-Drabbe was killed on 25 August 1944 in Tiraspol, Moldova in the course of the Soviet Jassy–Kishinev Offensive.

== Awards and decorations ==
- Knight's Cross of the Iron Cross on 22 February 1942 as Oberst and commander of Infanterie-Regiment 457

Military offices
Preceded by Generalmajor Hans Dörr	Commander of 384. Infanterie-Division; 24 February 1943 - 25 August 1944	Succeeded by None
