= Jozef Turanec =

Slovak general (1892–1957)

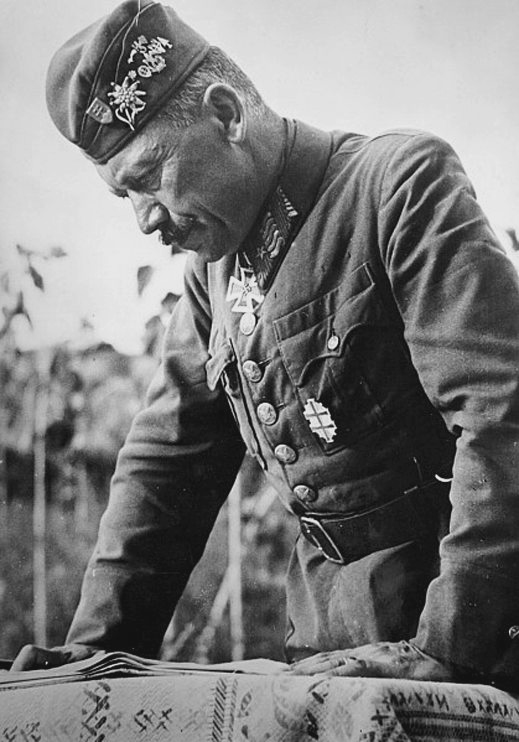
General II. Class Jozef Turanec

Jozef Turanec (7 March 1892 Sučany – 9 March 1957, Leopoldov) was a Slovak general during World War II. During his military career, he served as a soldier in the Austro-Hungarian Army during World War I, later as an officer in the Czechoslovak Army and eventually reaching the post of a 2nd Class General in service of Slovakia.

He was also a recipient of the Knight's Cross of the Iron Cross of Nazi Germany. Jozef Turanec served as a general in the Slovak invasion of Poland. He held partial command of the Slovak Fast Division and helped in the command of the expeditionary force during Operation Barbarossa. Turanec was a skilled commander and received the Iron Cross after a Slovak success in the Battle of Rostov in December 1941. After the war, Turanec was sentenced to 30 years in prison for treason. He died in prison in 1957.

== Awards ==
- Knight's Cross of the Iron Cross on 7 August 1942 as Major General and commander of the Slovak Fast Division
