= Hanskurt Höcker =

WW2 German General

- Born: 2 August 1894; Stadthagen, Principality of Schaumburg-Lippe, German Empire
- Died: 10 August 1961 (aged 67); Detmold, North Rhine-Westphalia, West Germany
- Military career
- Allegiance: German Empire (to 1918); Weimar Republic (to 1933); Nazi Germany
- Branch: Army (Wehrmacht)
- Service years: 1912–1945
- Rank: Generalleutnant
- Commands: 258. Infanterie-Division; 17. Luftwaffe Feld-Division; 167. Volksgrenadier-Division
- Conflicts: World War I World War II
- Awards: Knight's Cross of the Iron Cross; German Cross in Gold

Hanskurt Höcker (Note: Although secondary sources give his given name as "Hanskurt," his official personnel file has "Hans-Kurt.") (2 August 1894 – 10 August 1961) was a German general during World War II who commanded several divisions. He was a recipient of the Knight's Cross of the Iron Cross of Nazi Germany.

== Biography ==
Hanskurt Hermann Höcker was born on 2 August 1894 in Stadthagen in the Principality of Schaumburg-Lippe in the German Empire as the son of Hermann Höcker (†1928) and Charlotte, née Meyer (†1924).

Höcker began his military service as a Fahnenjunker (officer candidate) on 26 February 1912 in the Infanterie-Regiment „Graf Bülow von Dennewitz“ (6. Westfälisches) Nr. 55 and was commissioned a Leutnant (lieutenant) on 18 August 1913 with a patent of 19 August 1911.

With the start of World War I, Höcker deployed with his regiment to the Western Front, first seeing action in the Battle of Liège. He was promoted to Oberleutnant on 5 October 1916 and served as a company commander and acting battalion commander. He was taken prisoner by the French on 23 October 1917 and remained a Prisoner of war until 18 February 1920.

Upon Höcker's return to Germany, he was assigned to Reichswehr-Infanterie-Regiment 14 of the preliminary Reichswehr and subsequently assigned to the Reichswehr's 18. Infanterie-Regiment. In 1922, he received a seniority date as Oberleutnant of 5 October 1916. He was promoted to Hauptmann on 1 February 1924 and Major on 1 October 1933.

On 1 April 1934, Höcker was transferred to the staff of the Infantry School and on 1 January 1935, he was on the staff of the War School (Kriegsschule) in Munich. He was promoted to Oberstleutnant on 1 April 1936. In the years leading up to the start of World War II, he served as a battalion commander in Infanterie-Regiment 116 and Infanterie-Regiment 88 and on the staff of the War School in Hannover. He was promoted to Oberst on 1 January 1939.

With the mobilization for World War II, Höcker was given command of the newly-formed Infanterie-Regiment 487. On 19 January 1942, he was tasked with the leadership of the 258th Infantry Division and with his promotion to Generalmajor on 1 April 1942, he was named commander of the division. On 1 January 1943, he was promoted to Generalleutnant. Höcker was transferred to the Führerreserve (Leaders Reserve) on 1 October 1943, and named commander of the 17th Luftwaffe Field Division on 5 November 1943. He was named commander of the newly formed 167th Volksgrenadier Division on 17 October 1944. On 10 April 1945, he was named commander of the 167th Infantry Division (a reorganization of the remnants of his existing command), and on 17 April 1945, of the remnants of the 59th Infantry Division.

Höcker was in Allied captivity from April 1945 to June 1947. He died on 10 August 1961 in Detmold.

== Awards and decorations ==
- Kingdom of Prussia: Iron Cross 2nd Class (24 October 1914)
- Kingdom of Prussia: Iron Cross 1st Class (5 September 1915)
- Principality of Lippe: War Merit Cross (24 December 1914)
- Principality of Schaumburg-Lippe: Cross for Loyal Service (19 June 1915)
- Germany: Honor Cross of the World War 1914/1918 for Combatants (1935)
- Germany: Wehrmacht Long Service Award 4th through 1st Class (27 February 1937)
- Germany: West Wall Medal (18 April 1940)
- Germany: 1939 Clasp to the Iron Cross 2nd Class (1 June 1940)
- Germany: 1939 Clasp to the Iron Cross 1st Class (21 June 1940)
- Germany: German Cross in Gold (26 December 1941)
- Germany: Infantry Assault Badge (20 Februar 1942)
- Germany: Eastern Front Medal (22 August 1942)
- Germany: Knight's Cross of the Iron Cross (14 April 1943)

Military offices
| Preceded by Generalleutnant Karl Pflaum | Commander of 258. Infanterie-Division; 18 January 1942 – 1 October 1943 | Succeeded by Generalleutnant Eugen-Heinrich Bleyer |
| Preceded by Oberst Hans Korte | Commander of 17. Feld-Division; 5 November 1943 – 28 September 1944 | Succeeded by Disbanded after heavy losses |
| Preceded by Generalmajor Hans Hüttner | Commander of 167. Volksgrenadier-Division; 17 October 1944 – 4 April 1945 | Succeeded by None |
