= Carl Casper =

German general (1893–1970)

Karl Casper
- Born: 22 February 1893
- Died: 25 August 1970 (aged 77)
- Military career
- Allegiance: Nazi Germany
- Branch: Army (Wehrmacht)
- Rank: Generalleutnant
- Commands: 335th Infantry Division; 48th Infantry Division
- Conflicts: World War I World War II
- Awards: Knight's Cross of the Iron Cross

Karl Casper (22 February 1893 – 25 August 1970) was a general in the Wehrmacht of Nazi Germany during World War II who commanded several divisions. He was a recipient of the Knight's Cross of the Iron Cross.

== Awards and decorations ==
- Iron Cross (1914) 2nd Class (4 August 1915) & 1st Class (26 November 1916)
- Wound Badge (1914) in Black (25 May 1918)
- Hanseatic Cross of Hamburg (24 July 1917)
- Honour Cross of the World War 1914/1918 (30 November 1934)
- West Wall Medal (20 March 1940)
- Clasp to the Iron Cross (1939) 2nd Class (23 May 1940) & 1st Class (11 June 1940)
- Honour Roll Clasp of the Army (22 July 1941)
- Infantry Assault Badge in Bronze (7 September 1941)
- Eastern Front Medal (18 July 1942)
- Wound Badge (1939) in Silver (5 October 1943)
- Knight's Cross of the Iron Cross on 22 September 1941 as Oberst and commander of 118th Infantry Regiment (mot.)

Military offices
Preceded by Generalleutnant Max Dennerlein	Commander of 335th Infantry Division; 27 October 1942 - 7 September 1943	Succeeded by General der Infanterie Siegfried Rasp
Preceded by none	Commander of 48th Infantry Division; 1 February 1944 - 1 October 1944	Succeeded by Generalmajor Gerhard Kegler
