= 48th Infantry Division (Wehrmacht) =

171st Reserve Division 48th Infantry Division 48th Volksgrenadier Division
- German: 171. Reserve-Division; 48. Infanterie-Division; 48. Volksgrenadier-Division
- 48. Infanterie Division Vehicle Insignia
- Active: Feb 1943 – 1945
- Country: Nazi Germany
- Branch: Heer
- Type: Infantry
- Size: Division
- Engagements: World War II: Northern France; Austria

Commanders
- Notable commanders: Lt. General Karl Casper

The 48th Infantry Division (German: 48. Infanterie-Division) was a German World War II infantry division.

== Operational history ==
The 48th Infantry division was formed in November 1943 in Ostend, West Flanders from the 171st Reserve Division. It had a strong Polish representation throughout its ranks.

The 171st Reserve Division had been established on 1 October 1942 in the occupied Netherlands and stationed in the Arnhem area. In February 1943, the division was transferred to Diksmuide in Belgium. On November 23, 1943, the 171st Reserve Division was restructured and renamed the 48th Infantry Division.

After completing reorganization in February 1944, the unit was assigned to coastal protection near Ostend. In August 1944, after the collapse of the Normandy Front, the 48th was transferred to France.

First engaged in the Chartres area by the 3rd US Army, it performed poorly, being continually driven back by the 3rd Army through Metz and finally the Siegfried Line, where it collapsed altogether and was absorbed into the 559th Volksgrenadier Division. it was sent to the Eastern Front assigned to the German 8th Army defending Vienna, where it surrendered to the Soviets.

== Organization ==
- 126th Grenadier Regiment
- 127th Grenadier Regiment
- 128th Grenadier Regiment
- 148th Füsilier Battalion
- 148th Artillery Regiment
- 148th Anti-Tank Battalion
- 148th Field Replacement Battalion
- 148th Divisional Intelligence Battalion

== Commanders ==
- Lt. General Friedrich Fürst (September 20, 1942 - January 5, 1944)
- Lt. General Karl Casper (February 1 - October 1, 1944
- Maj. General Gerhard Kegler (October-November 1944)
- Colonel Arnold Scholz (October 1944 - May 1945)
