= Battle of Lypovec =

1941 battle of World War II

- Part of Operation Barbarossa of World War II
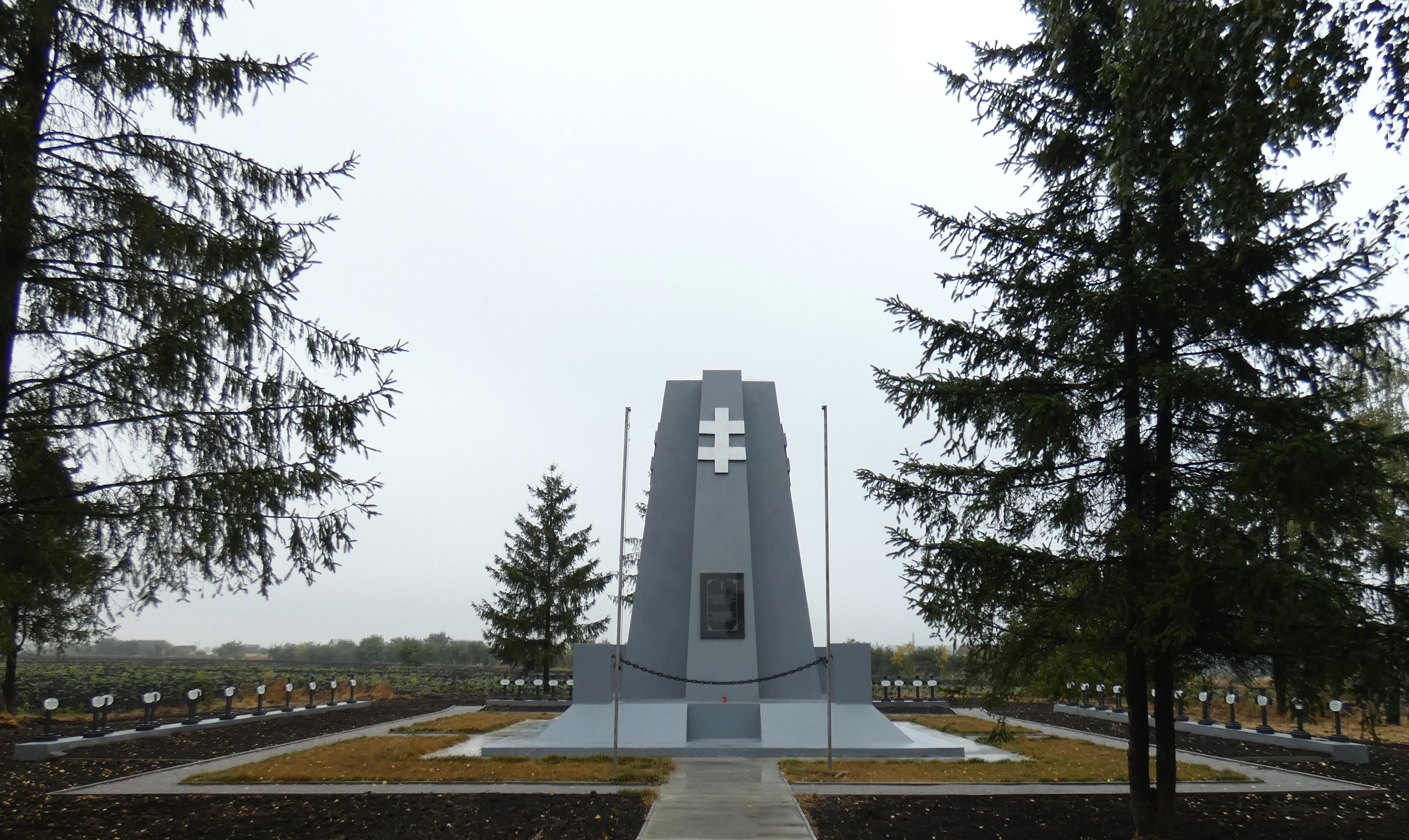
- Monument to fallen Slovak soldiers in Lypovec
| Date | 22 July 1941 |
| Location | Lypovets, Ukrainian SSR, Soviet Union |
| Result | Slovak victory |

Belligerents
| Slovakia | Soviet Union |

Commanders and leaders
| Rudolf Pilfousek | (Soviet Union) Semyon Tkachenko |

Units involved
| Mobile Brigade | 44th Rifle Division |

Strength
| c. 5,000 soldiers 43 tanks 123 artillery pieces | c. 15,000 soldiers unknown number of tanks and artillery pieces |

Casualties and losses
| 75 killed 167 wounded 2 POWs; 17 MIA; 5 tanks destroyed 1 armored car destroyed 7 tanks damaged 2 armored car damaged | 600 killed 1,000 wounded |

The Battle of Lypovec was an armed clash fought between the Slovak Mobile Brigade (Slovenská rýchla brigáda) and troops of the Red Army on 22 July 1941 in the set of Operation Barbarossa. It was one of the first battles of Slovakia with the Red Army.

== The Battle ==
The Soviet defense on the cross of the San River was the unit of the 10th Fortified area of 12th Army. The defense of Lypovets was led by 44th Rifle Division under the command of General Semyon Tkachenko. This division consisted of two fresh regiments (305th and 319th) and part of two infantry regiments already exhausted by the fighting (25th and 295th). Its combat role was to delay the advance of the enemy. The Mobile Brigade, with fewer than 5,000 soldiers, 43 tanks and 123 guns, managed to occupy Lypovets, but then the brigade ran into the 44th Rifle Division of the Red Army. Because the Slovak tanks had run out of fuel, the Slovak soldiers came under heavy pressure and the catastrophe was avoided by artillery support, which managed to decimate the Soviets enough to allow the Slovak soldiers to retreat.

The Slovak Rychlá brigáda lost 5 tanks: three LT vz. 35, one LT vz. 38 and one LT vz. 40. Plus one OA vz.30 armored car.

== Aftermath ==
The Slovaks suffered 261 casualties: 75 killed, 167 wounded, 2 POWs and 17 MIA, while the Soviets had 600 killed and 1000 wounded. The Rýchla brigáda had not had enough force to defeat a stronger enemy in pre-prepared positions. The reluctance of Slovak soldiers to fight against the Soviet Union was also manifested by the first defectors to the Soviet side, who were reported missing in official reports. The mechanical staff had enough technical means to repair all of the battalion vehicles, but under the influence of anti-fascist and pro-Czechoslovak officers, they had withdrawn all vehicles and the whole battalion to Slovakia on the pretext that they can not be repaired under field conditions. The rest of the brigade was assigned to the German 295. Infanterie-Division.
