= 93rd Rifle Division (1942–1946) =

- Active: June 1942–1946
- Country: Soviet Union
- Branch: Red Army
- Type: Infantry
- Engagements: World War II: Operation Büffel; Battle of the Dnieper; Kirovograd offensive; Bereznegovatoye–Snigirevka offensive; Odessa Offensive; Second Jassy–Kishinev offensive; Belgrade offensive; Budapest offensive; Siege of Budapest
- Decorations: Order of the Red Banner; Order of Suvorov
- Battle honours: Mirgorod

Commanders
- Notable commanders: Apollon Kruze

The 93rd Rifle Division (Russian: 93-я стрелковая дивизия) was an infantry division of the Red Army during World War II.

== History ==
The 93rd Rifle Division was formed in June and July 1942 in Dzherzhinsk as part of the 9th Reserve Army. Colonel Mikhail Sukhanov became commander in June. The division included the following elements:

- 51st Rifle Regiment
- 129th Rifle Regiment
- 266th Rifle Regiment
- 100th Artillery Regiment
- 55th Reconnaissance Company
- 144th Separate Destroyer Anti-Tank Battalion
- 107th Sapper Battalion
- 870th Separate Signals Company
- 1st Auto Transport Company)
- 82nd Medical-Sanitary Battalion
- 33rd Separate Chemical Defense Company
- 134th Field Bakery

In late August the division was relocated to the area 25 km south of Selizharovo, where it joined the Kalinin Front. The division was in the front reserve until September, conducting training. The division was assigned to the 41st Army on 15 September and fought in offensive and defensive battles in the area of Pushkari, Verevkino, Primushki, and Vyshegory west and southwest of Bely. Sukhanov was relieved of command in mid-November. He was replaced by Colonel Stepan Isayev, who was also relieved of command on 12 December. For "failure to carry out an order," Isayev was given a suspended prison sentence and demoted to deputy commander of another division. Major General Georgy Latyshev took command on 3 December. During the Rzhev–Vyazma Offensive, the division played the main role in the liberation of Bely. The division fought as part of the army until March 1943.

In April 1943, the 93rd Rifle Division was transferred to the 39th Army, and in May 1943 withdrawn to the Reserve of the Supreme High Command. The 93rd became part of the 52nd Army in reserve at Vyshny Volochyok. In July Latyshev was promoted to command a corps of the army. Colonel Apollon Kruze replaced Latyshev. From 25 August it fought as part of the 52nd Army on the Voronezh Front in the offensive towards Kiev. For its participation in the liberation of Mirgorod on 18 September the division was awarded the name of the city as an honorific on 19 September. Pursuing retreating German troops, the division reached the east bank of the Dnieper in the area of Pekari, forced the river and fought to hold and expand its bridgehead during the Battle of the Dnieper. In October, the division was placed under direct front control, and in November it joined the 57th Army of the 3rd Ukrainian Front, becoming part of the army's 68th Rifle Corps in December. The division conducted offensive and defensive battles in the Piatykhatky area, then participated in the Kirovograd offensive. The 93rd defended positions in the Kirovograd area until March. From 10 March the division fought in the Bereznegovatoye–Snigirevka offensive and the Odessa Offensive. Capturing a bridgehead on the west bank of the Dniester, the 93rd went over to the defensive. During the Second Jassy–Kishinev offensive, on 23 August, Kruze was promoted to corps deputy commander.

Colonel Stepan Salychev took command of the division on 23 August. The division participated in the occupation of Bulgaria. The division fought as part of the 57th Army in the Belgrade offensive, in which it liberated the cities of Topola, Kragujevac, Čačak and others. For the liberation of Belgrade the division was awarded the Order of Suvorov, 2nd class on 14 November. After the Belgrade offensive ended the division was withdrawn to the front reserve, then on 21 December joined the 4th Guards Army and fought in the Budapest offensive, and the Siege of Budapest. Salychev was relieved of command on 10 January 1945. Colonel Konstantin Sergeyev replaced Salychev, when the division was part of the 10th Guards Rifle Corps. From February to the end of the war the division was part of the 26th Army, with which it fought in the Budapest offensive and in the Vienna offensive. The division was part of the 104th Rifle Corps of the army for the Vienna offensive, fighting west of Lepshen. Colonel Vladimir Kheraskov took command of the division on 10 April, after Sergeyev transferred to command another division.

For its actions, the division was also awarded the Order of the Red Banner on 7 September 1944. The 266th Rifle Regiment of the division was awarded the Budapest honorific.

The division and the 104th Rifle Corps headquarters were disbanded in 1946 as part of the Southern Group of Forces.

== Commanders ==
The following officers commanded the division:

- Colonel Mikhail Afanasyevich Sukhanov (28 June–16 November 1942)
- Colonel Stepan Yefimovich Isayev (17 November–1 December 1942)
- Major General Georgy Aleksandrovich Latyshev (2 December 1942–1 August 1943)
- Colonel Apollon Yakovlevich Kruze (2 August 1943–13 October 1944, major general 25 October 1943)
- Colonel Stepan Vasilievich Salychev (14 October 1944–12 January 1945)
- Colonel Konstantin Alekseyevich Sergeyev (13 January–10 April 1945)
- Colonel Vladimir Petrovich Kheraskov (11 April 1945–July 1946)
