= Saratovskaya (rural locality) =

Saratovskaya Саратовская
- stanitsa
- Location within Krasnodar Krai Location within Russia
- Coordinates: 44°42′30″N 39°13′00″E
- Country: Russia
- Region: Krasnodar Krai
- Town: Goryachy Klyuch
- Time zone: UTC+03:00

Saratovskaya (Russian: Саратовская) is a rural locality (a stanitsa) under the administrative jurisdiction of the Town of Goryachy Klyuch of Krasnodar Krai, Russia. Population: 6,567 (2010 census); 6,039 (2002 census);
