= Army Group South Ukraine =

- German: Heeresgruppe Südukraine; Romanian: Grupul de Armate Ucraina de Sud
- Active: 5 April – 23 September 1944
- Country: Nazi Germany; Romania (until 24 August 1944)
- Allegiance: Nazi Germany
- Branch: German Army; Royal Romanian Army
- Size: 905,000 (500,000 Germans, 405,000 Romanians) 120 tanks + 280 assault guns 7,600 artillery pieces 810 aircraft
- Engagements: Eastern Front: Odessa Offensive; First Jassy-Kishinev Offensive; Second Jassy-Kishinev Offensive

Commanders
- Notable commanders: Ferdinand Schörner; Johannes Frießner

Army Group South Ukraine (German: Heeresgruppe Südukraine, Romanian: Grupul de Armate Ucraina de Sud) was a joint German-Romanian group on the Eastern Front during World War II.

Army Group South Ukraine was created on 5 April 1944 by renaming Army Group A. This army group saw action during the Jassy-Kishinev Operation and after taking heavy casualties was redesignated Army Group South (Heeresgruppe Süd) at midnight on 23 September 1944. (Note: Edwald Klapdor. 2011, Viking Panzers: The German 5th SS Tank Regiment in the East in World War II, pg 383 states that it was redesignated Army Group South on 15 September, 1944.)

Geographically, Army Group South Ukraine – headquartered at Slănic-Moldova – held 392 miles (680 km) of front, of which 160 were held by Romanians. Its operational area covered all of Eastern Romania, from a line 40 km (25 miles) east of Bucharest.

== Order of Battle, 15 August 1944 (Army HQ) ==
Sources:

- Armeegruppe Dumitrescu – General Petre Dumitrescu
  - Romanian Third Army – General Petre Dumitrescu (HQ – Bolgrad)
  - Sixth Army – General der Artillerie Maximilian Fretter-Pico (HQ – Tarutino)
- Armeegruppe Wohler – General der Infanterie Otto Wohler
  - Eighth Army – General der Infanterie Otto Wohler (HQ – Roman)
  - Romanian Fourth Army – General Gheorghe Avramescu (HQ – Bacău)

== Commanders ==
No.	Portrait	Commander (Note: Army Group South Ukraine could not take major operational decisions without securing Ion Antonescu's approval.)	Took office	Left office	Time in office
1	Ferdinand Schörner	Generalfeldmarschall; Ferdinand Schörner (1892–1973)	31 March 1944	25 July 1944	86 days
2	Johannes Frießner	Generaloberst; Johannes Frießner (1892–1971)	25 July 1944	23 September 1944	90 days

== Bibliography ==
=== References ===
- Ziemke, Earl F. (2002). Stalingrad to Berlin: The German Defeat in the East. Washington, D.C.: Center of Military History, US Army. ISBN 9781780392875.
- Klapdor, Ewald (2011). Viking Panzers: The German 5th SS Tank Regiment in the East in World War II. Mechanicsburg, PA: Stackpole Books.
