= Korpsabteilung =

German military unit in World War II

Korpsabteilung (transl. Corps Detachment) was a division-size infantry formation established by the German Wehrmacht during World War II.

== History ==
During summer and autumn 1943, Wehrmacht suffered heavy losses in men and materiel at the hands of the Red Army on the Eastern Front. Simultaneously, it had to build up military strength in France prior to the expected invasion and to reinforce the Italian theatre, where the Allies had crossed the Strait of Messina and landed on the Italian mainland at Salerno and Termoli in September 1943. Therefore, the Replacement Army could no longer generate the replacements to bring up to strength formations that had been depleted in the Eastern Front battles.

In order to preserve the cadres and lineage of the divisions that had suffered heavy losses, to economise on supply and support effort, and probably to give an image of greater strength than really existed, the OKH decided to form Korpsabteilungen on the establishment of infantry divisions, i.e. containing three infantry regiments with two battalions each, an artillery regiment, and divisional troops (reconnaissance, anti-tank, pioneer, medical, and supply battalions). The staff of the Korpsabteilung was obtained from one of the divisions that were used to create them, while each of the infantry regiments represented one division. They were called Divisionsgruppe (division group), and each of the battalions in one of the Divisionsabteilung was called a Regimentsgruppe (regimental group). Unlike German infantry divisions, Korpsabteilungen were not numbered but identified by a letter.

Korpsabteilungen were created in three waves, the first and largest one with five Korpsabteilungen (A to E) on 2 November 1943 in Army groups A, Mitte and Süd, a second with Korpsabteilung F in March 1944 at Heeresgruppe A, and the third with Korpsabteilungen G and H at the end of July, early August 1944, after the devastating losses suffered by the Wehrmacht in Operation Bagration.

When it became clear in autumn 1944 that the individual divisions out of which the Korpsabteilungen were built would never be rebuilt due to a lack of manpower, the Korpsabteilungen were renamed as Infanteriedivisionen, and most of them were given the numerical designation of the division that provided the command staff at the time of the formation of the Korpsabteilung.

== List of Korpsabteilungen and areas of operation ==
=== Formed by Heeresgruppe Süd on 2 November 1943 ===
- Korpsabteilung A (Command Staff from 161. Infanteriedivision, Divisionsgruppen 161., 293., 355.) renamed 161. Infanteriedivision 27. July 1944
- Korpsabteilung B (Command Staff from 112. Infantry Division, Divisionsgruppen 112., 255., 332.) destroyed in the Korsun Pocket in March 1944, remnants into 88. and 57. Infanteriedivision
- Korpsabteilung C (Command Staff from 183. Infantry Division, Divisionsgruppen 183., 217., 339.) largely destroyed in the Brody Pocket in July 1944, rebuilt as 183. Infanteriedivision

=== Formed by Heeresgruppe Mitte on 2 November 1943 ===
- Korpsabteilung D (Command Staff from 56. Infantry Division, Divisionsgruppen 56., 262.) largely destroyed in Operation Bagration in June 1944, rebuilt in July 1944, renamed as 56. Infanteriedivision in September 1944
- Korpsabteilung E (Command Staff from 251. Infantry Division, Divisionsgruppen 86., 137., 251.) renamed 251. Infantry Division 16 October 1944

=== Formed by Heeresgruppe A on 13 March 1944 ===
- Korpsabteilung F (Command Staff from 62. Infantry Division, Divisionsgruppen 38., 62., 123.) renamed 62. Infantry Division 20. July 1944

=== Formed by Heeresgruppe Mitte in July/August 1944 ===
- Korpsabteilung G (Command Staff from 299. Infantry Division, Divisionsgruppen 260., 299., 337.), renamed as 299. Infanteriedivision on 1 September 1944
- Korpsabteilung H (Command Staff from 197. Infantry Division, Divisionsgruppen 95., 197., 256.) renamed 95. Infantry Division 10 September 1944

== See also ==
- Military organization
