= 335th Infantry Division =

- German: 335. Infanterie-Division
- Active: 1940–1944
- Country: Nazi Germany
- Branch: Army
- Type: Infantry
- Size: Division
- Garrison/HQ: Konstanz
- Engagements: Second World War: Battle of Kursk; Battle of the Dnieper; Nikopol–Krivoi Rog Offensive; Odessa Offensive; Second Jassy–Kishinev Offensive

The 335th Infantry Division (German: 335. Infanterie-Division) was an infantry division of the German Army during the Second World War, active from 1940 to 1944. It saw active service in France and on the Eastern Front and was destroyed in fighting in Romania in August 1944.

== Operational history ==
The 335th Infantry Division was formed in Konstanz in November 1940 under the command of Generalleutnant (Note: The rank of generalleutnant is equivalent to that of major general in the United States Army.) Max Dennerlein. The division nominally fell within the responsibility of Wehrkreis V. At its core were three infantry battalions transferred from the 298th Infantry Division while two battalions came from the 197th Infantry Division. The 87th Infantry Division, which had fought in the Battle of France, also transferred a battalion to the 335th. It was one of several static divisions raised for service in the occupied countries of Western Europe. It also had a strong Polish representation.

In mid-1941, the 335th Infantry Division was posted to a position near the border between occupied France and Vichy France. By this time it had reached a strength of over 13,200 personnel. Following the Allied invasion of French North Africa in November 1942, German forces moved into Vichy France in an operation known as Case Anton. As part of this, the 335th, recently converted into an attack division, seized the port of Marseille. After five months in Vichy France, it was transferred to the Eastern Front. It fought in several engagements against the Soviets, including the battles at Kursk and along the Dnieper. Generalmajor (Note: The rank of generalmajor is equivalent to that of brigadier general in the United States Army.) Karl Casper, who had taken over command of the division from Dennerlein just prior to Case Anton, was wounded during the fighting at the Dnieper and was replaced by Oberst (Note: The rank of oberst is equivalent to that of colonel in the United States Army.) Siegfried Rasp.

By January 1944, the division's losses were such that it numbered only 4,300 or so personnel. Transferred to Romania later that year, it received some personnel from the recently disbanded 5th Field Division (L). In Romania it was involved in the Second Jassy–Kishinev Offensive, the Soviet Army's offensive of August 1944 in the eastern part of the country. The division, commanded by Oberst Eugen Franz Brechtel, was destroyed and its survivors surrendered to the Soviets.

== Commanders ==
- Generalleutnant Max Dennerlein (15 November 1940 – 26 October 1942);
- Generalmajor Karl Casper (27 October 1942 – 6 September 1943);
- Oberst Siegfried Rasp (7 September 1943 – 29 June 1944);
- Oberst Eugen Franz Brechtel (30 June – August 1944). (MIA). (Note: Ranks stated are those at the time of taking command.)

== See also ==
- List of German divisions in World War II
