= 384th Infantry Division =

- German: 384. Infanterie-Division
- Active: 10 January 1942 – 10 October 1944
- Country: Nazi Germany
- Branch: Heer (Wehrmacht)
- Type: Infantry
- Size: Division
- Garrison/HQ: Dobeln
- Engagements: World War II: Odessa Offensive

Commanders
- Notable commanders: Eccard Freiherr von Gablenz

The 384th Infantry Division was a Wehrmacht unit formed during the winter of 1941/42, as part of the 18th wave. All infantry divisions of this wave, numbers 383 to 389, were referred to as "Rhine Gold" divisions. The 384th was sent to the 3rd Panzer Corps, 1st Panzer Army, just in time to be involved in defensive fighting during the Soviet offensive in the Second Battle of Kharkov, early in the summer of 1942. Afterwards, the division took part in the offensive operations that led to Stalingrad. After the Soviet counteroffensive, Operation Uranus, most of the combat elements of the division were split between the 44th and the 376th Infantry Divisions, but both were surrounded at Stalingrad and destroyed.

The surviving combat troops, in the form of the 2/536th battalion, were allocated to the 9th Panzer Division to help replace the panzer grenadiers in its schutzen brigade. The non-combat elements were set to northern France and the division was rebuilt. This process was completed in late 1943, and the division, minus its reconnaissance battalion and 3/384th Artillery Battalion, was again sent to Ukraine. After almost a year at the front, in the autumn of 1944, the 384th was surrounded and then destroyed in defensive fighting near the city of Kishinev, during the Soviet Jassy–Kishinev Offensive.

== Organization ==
Structure of the division:

- Headquarters
- 534th Infantry Regiment
- 535th Infantry Regiment
- 536th Infantry Regiment
- 384th Artillery Regiment
- 384th Reconnaissance Battalion
- 384th Tank Destroyer Battalion
- 384th Engineer Battalion
- 384th Signal Battalion
- 384th Field Replacement Battalion
- 384th Divisional Supply Group

== Commanders ==
- Generalleutnant Kurt Hoffmann (10 January 1942 – 12 February 1942)
- Generalleutnant Eccard Freiherr von Gablenz (13 February 1942 – 15 January 1943)
- Generalmajor Hans Dörr (16 January 1943 – 23 February 1943)
- Generalleutnant Hans de Salengre-Drabbe (24 February 1943 – 25 August 1944) (KIA).
