= 258th Infantry Division =

- 258. Infanterie-Division
- Divisional insignia
- Active: 26 August 1939 – 9 October 1944
- Country: Nazi Germany
- Branch: German Army
- Type: Infantry
- Size: Division
- Engagements: World War II: Invasion of Poland; Battle of France; Operation Barbarossa; Battle of Kursk; Odessa Offensive

The 258th Infantry Division (German: 258. Infanterie-Division) was an infantry division of the German Army during World War II.

== Combat History ==
After its formation, the division was deployed to southern Poland, where it served as the Army Group reserve for Army Group South. At the conclusion of the Polish campaign, the division remained in Poland as part of the occupation forces. In December 1939, it was transferred to the Saarbrücken area on the Western Front, where it held defensive positions—even during the initial phase of Case Red (the German offensive against France).

On 14 June 1940, the division participated in an attack on the Maginot Line, successfully breaching the defenses and advancing toward Nancy.

From the opening stages of Operation Barbarossa, the 258th Infantry Division was actively engaged, taking part in the early encirclement battles near Białystok. During the Battle of Smolensk, it was assigned to a defensive role, initially protecting the southern flank of Army Group Centre near Mogilev, and later, following Guderian’s pivot to the south, covering the left flank of his panzer group.

By October 1941, Army Group Centre launched Operation Typhoon, the offensive aimed at capturing Moscow. The division was assigned to the XL Panzer Corps, part of Panzer Group 4, for the assault. Although Soviet defenses quickly collapsed, opening a clear path to the Soviet capital, the advance was hindered by the onset of autumn rains (the Rasputitsa), which severely impacted logistics. Supplies were limited, forcing the troops to forage for food and fuel. The division resorted to using local "Panje" carts for transport, which, due to their low capacity, delivered only a quarter of the division’s required ammunition. To offset equipment losses, captured Soviet weaponry was incorporated.

Despite these conditions, the division pushed forward and eventually reached the town of Khimki, located just eight kilometres from central Moscow.

From February to July 1942, the division held defensive positions east of Vyazma. The severe winter fighting of 1941–1942 had significantly depleted its infantry strength, limiting it initially to the defense of a narrow sector. As reinforcements arrived, the division gradually rebuilt its infantry battalions, enabling it to expand its defensive front. By February 1943, the sector under its control extended over 40 kilometers.

=== Kursk ===
Following the encirclement of the German 6th Army at Stalingrad, the Soviet winter offensives continued to ripple across the Eastern Front. In February 1943, the defensive line of the German 2nd Army collapsed south of Orel, along the boundary with 2nd Panzer Army. Soviet forces exploited the breach and advanced northward, threatening Orel from the south and east. To halt the Soviet advance, Army Group Centre shifted reinforcements to the area. The 258th Infantry Division was withdrawn from its previous sector and redeployed to the newly forming 2nd Panzer Army front south of Orel. There, the division helped stabilize the line, though the Soviet advance had already created a deep salient around the city of Kursk.

In July 1943, the division participated in the Battle of Kursk, the major German summer offensive (Operation Citadel), which aimed to regain the strategic initiative and reverse recent Soviet gains. However, the offensive failed to achieve a breakthrough, and the division sustained heavy casualties during the assault on the deeply fortified Soviet positions.

In the aftermath of the failed offensive, Soviet forces launched a counteroffensive that eliminated the German salient around Orel, forcing German units, including the 258th Infantry Division, to retreat to more defensible lines.

Subsequently, the division was transferred south and continued to retreat with Army Group South to the Dnieper defensive line. It fought in the Nikopol bridgehead in southern Ukraine. After the collapse of German positions along the Dnieper, the division conducted a fighting withdrawal across Ukraine, eventually reaching defensive positions in Romania, where the front temporarily stabilized.

On 20 August 1944, during the Second Jassy–Kishinev Offensive, the Soviet 3rd Ukrainian Front launched a massive assault, breaking through Romanian and German defenses. The entire German 6th Army was encircled. By the end of the month, German pockets were eliminated, and the 258th Infantry Division was completely destroyed in the fighting. The division was not reformed.

== Commanders ==
- Generalleutnant Walter Wollmann 26.August.1939 – 1.August.1940
- Generalleutnant Waldemar Henrici 1.August.1940 – 2.October.1941
- Generalmajor Karl Pflaum 2.October.1941 – 18.January.1942
- Generalleutnant Hans-Kurt Höcker 18.January.1942 – 1.October.1943
- Generalleutnant Eugen-Heinrich Bleyer 1.October.1943 – 4.September.1944
- Oberst Rudolf Hielscher 4.September.1944 – unknown

== Organisation ==
1939

- Infantry Regiment 458 (I, II, III)
- Infantry Regiment 478 (I, II, III)
- Infantry Regiment 479 (I, II, III)
- Reconnaissance Battalion 258
- Artillery Regiment 258 (I, II, III, IV)
- Engineer Battalion 258
- Anti-tank Battalion 258
- Signals Battalion 258
- Division services 258

1942

- Grenadier Regiment 458 (I, II, III)
- Grenadier Regiment 478 (I, II, III)
- Grenadier Regiment 479 (I, II, III)
- Bicycle Detachment 258
- Artillery Regiment 258 (I, II, III, IV)
- Engineer Battalion 258
- Anti-tank Battalion 258
- Signals Battalion 258
- Division services 258

1943-1944

- Grenadier Regiment 478 (I, II)
- Grenadier Regiment 479 (I, II)
- Divisions Group 387
  - Group Staff
  - Regiment Group 525
  - Regiment Group 542
- Fusilier Battalion 258
- Artillery Regiment 258
  - I. Abteilung
  - II. Abteilung
  - III./Artillery Regiment 387
  - IV. Abteilung
- Engineer Battalion 258
- Anti-tank Battalion 258
- Signals Battalion 258
- Field replacement Battalion 258
- Division services 258
