= Slovak Expeditionary Army Group =

- Slovenská Armádna Skupina
- Active: September 1941 – June 1944
- Country: Slovakia
- Branch: Slovak Army
- Size: 45,000
- Engagements: World War II: Eastern Front; Battle of Uman; Battle of Lypovec; Battle of Rostov (1941); Operation Bamberg; Battle of the Caucasus; Battle of the Dnieper; Melitopol Offensive

The Slovak Expeditionary Army Group was an element of the military forces of the Slovak Republic that fought under Nazi German command on the Eastern Front during World War II.

== Background ==
The Slovak Republic was a puppet state established on 14 March 1939. It possessed a small army of its own, largely made up of parts inherited from the old Czechoslovak Army. The 1st Slovak Infantry Division took part in the German invasion of Poland in September 1939. In the aftermath of the German invasion of France, the German government consolidated its control of the Slovak regime. On 21 June 1941, the Slovak government was informed about the invasion of Russia and offered to participate in the German invasion of the Soviet Union. Germany accepted the following day. The Slovak Army was called up, as the regime sought to demonstrate its indispensability to Nazi Germany and that its loyalty was greater than that of Hungary.

== History ==
The Slovak Expeditionary Army Group of about 45,000 men entered the Soviet Union shortly after the German attack. This army lacked logistic and transportation support, so a much smaller unit, the Slovak Mobile Command under command of Rudolf Pilfousek (a.k.a. the Pilfousek Brigade), was formed from units selected from this force; the rest of the Slovak army was relegated to rear-area security duty. The Slovak Mobile Command was attached to the German 17th Army (as was the Hungarian Carpathian Group also) and shortly thereafter given over to direct German command, the Slovaks lacking the command infrastructure to exercise effective operational control. This unit fought with the 17th Army through July 1941, including at the Battle of Uman and the Battle of Lypovec.

At the beginning of August 1941, the Slovak Mobile Command was dissolved and instead two infantry divisions were formed from the Slovak Expeditionary Army Group. The Slovak 2nd Division was a security division, but the Slovak 1st Division was a front-line unit which fought in the campaigns of 1941 and 1942, reaching the Caucasus area with Army Group B. The Slovak 1st Division then shared the fate of the German southern forces, losing its heavy equipment in the Kuban bridgehead and suffering heavy losses at Melitopol in the southern Ukraine.

Slovak troops took part in Operation Bamberg, an anti-partisan action in which 5,000 alleged partisans, including 200 Jews, were shot. Slovak soldiers participated in numerous pogroms and frequently robbed Jews during the first days and weeks of the occupation in the summer of 1941. However, there was no equivalent of the Barbarossa decree (which authorized Wehrmacht soldiers to execute civilians without trial) and some Slovak soldiers were tried for robbing or murdering Jews, receiving only very light sentences. Many Slovak soldiers and the army leadership nevertheless approved of the anti-Semitic actions, due in part to the large amount of propaganda promoting the Jewish Bolshevik canard.

In June 1944, the remnant of the division, no longer considered fit for combat due to low morale, was disarmed and the personnel assigned to construction and logistical work, a fate which had already befallen the Slovak 2nd Division earlier for the same reason.

== Commanders of the 1st Mobile Infantry Division ==
- Augustín Malár (September 1941 – September 1942)
- Jozef Turanec (September 1942 – January 1943)
- Stefan Jurech (January 1943 – September 1943)
- Elmir Lendvay (September 1943 – June 1944)

== Photo gallery ==
War flag of the Slovak Republic, used by military forces

War Eagle of the Slovak Army

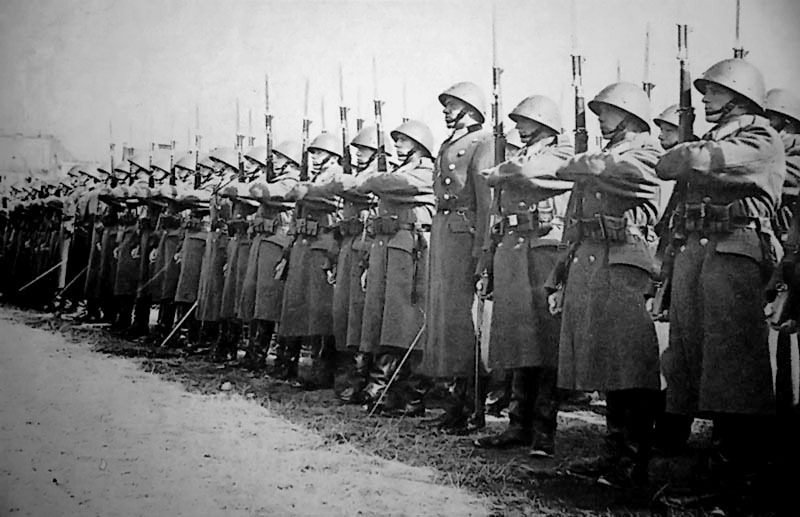
Infantry of the Slovak Army

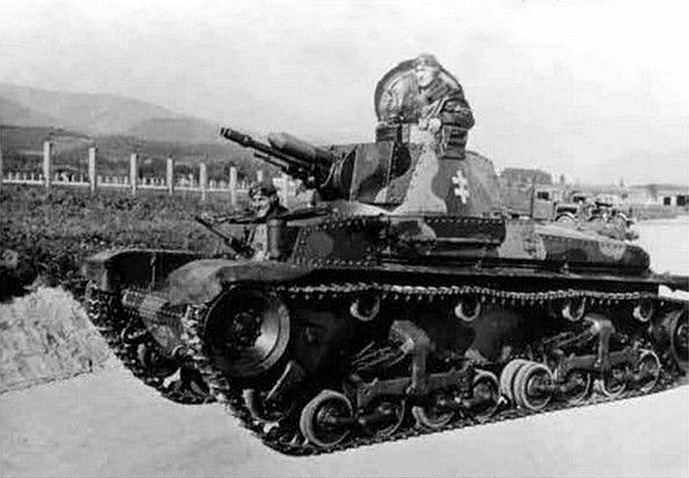
LT-35 light tank of the Slovak Army

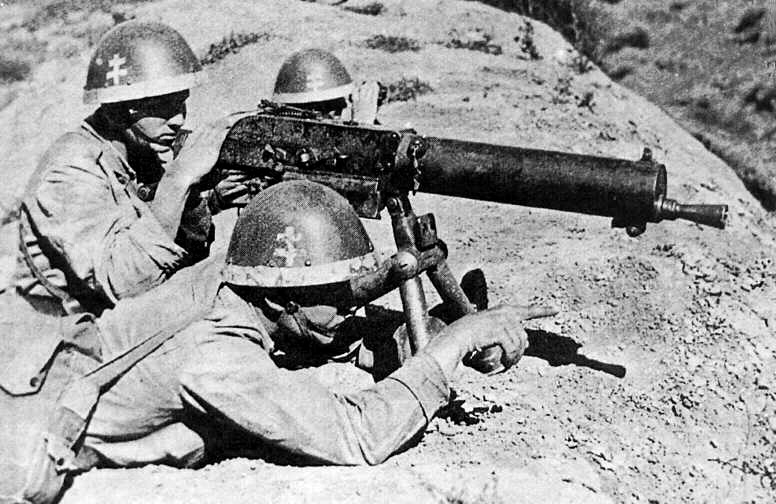
Machine gun team during manoeuvres in Crimea, 1943

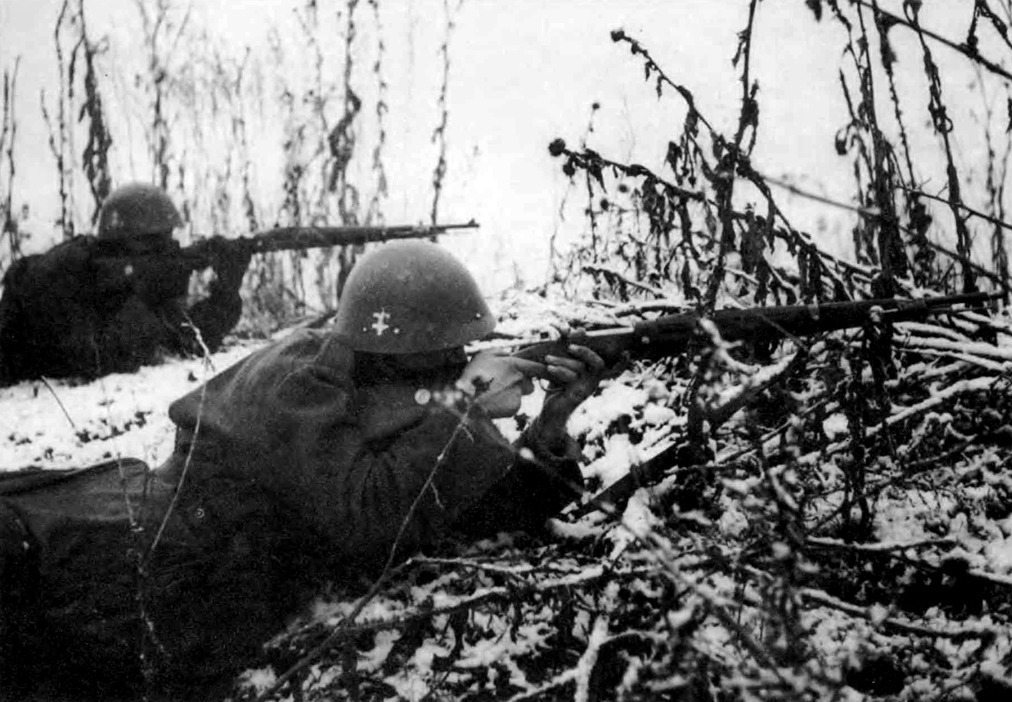
Slovak infantry in firing positions, winter 1941

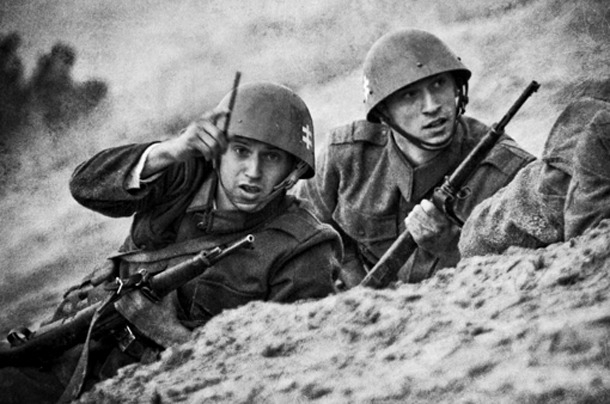
Slovak soldiers during the campaign against the Soviet Union

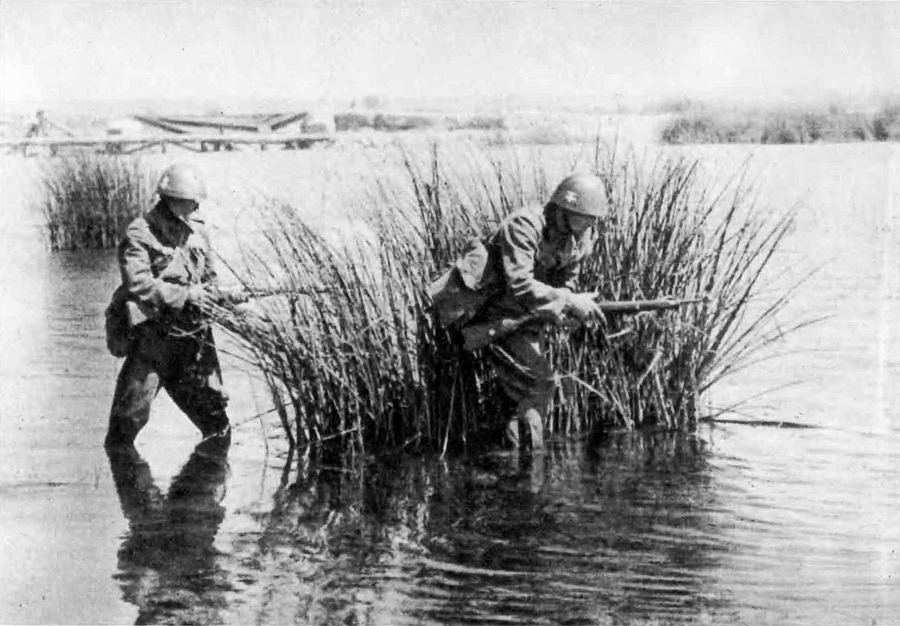
Slovak advanced scouting units crossing the river Mius, Ukrainian SSR, Soviet Union

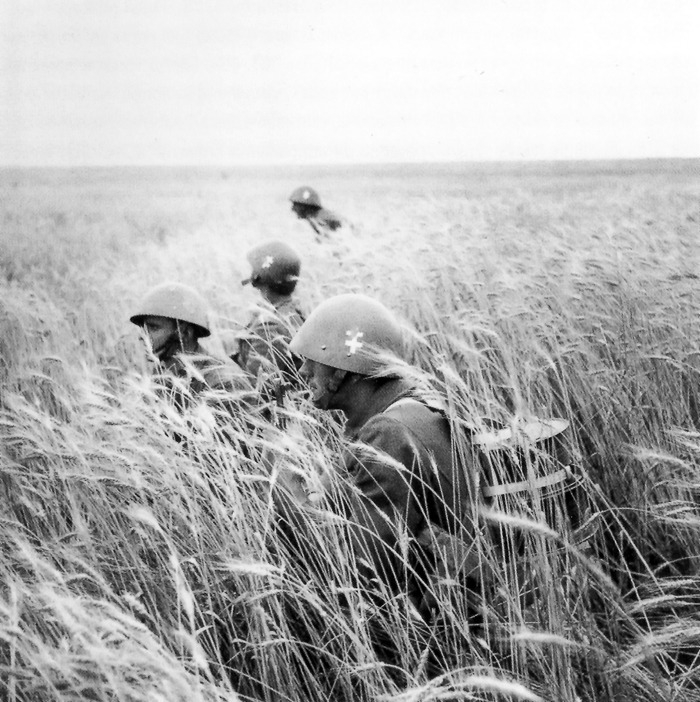
Slovak soldiers in rye around Lypovets, Ukrainian SSR, Soviet Union

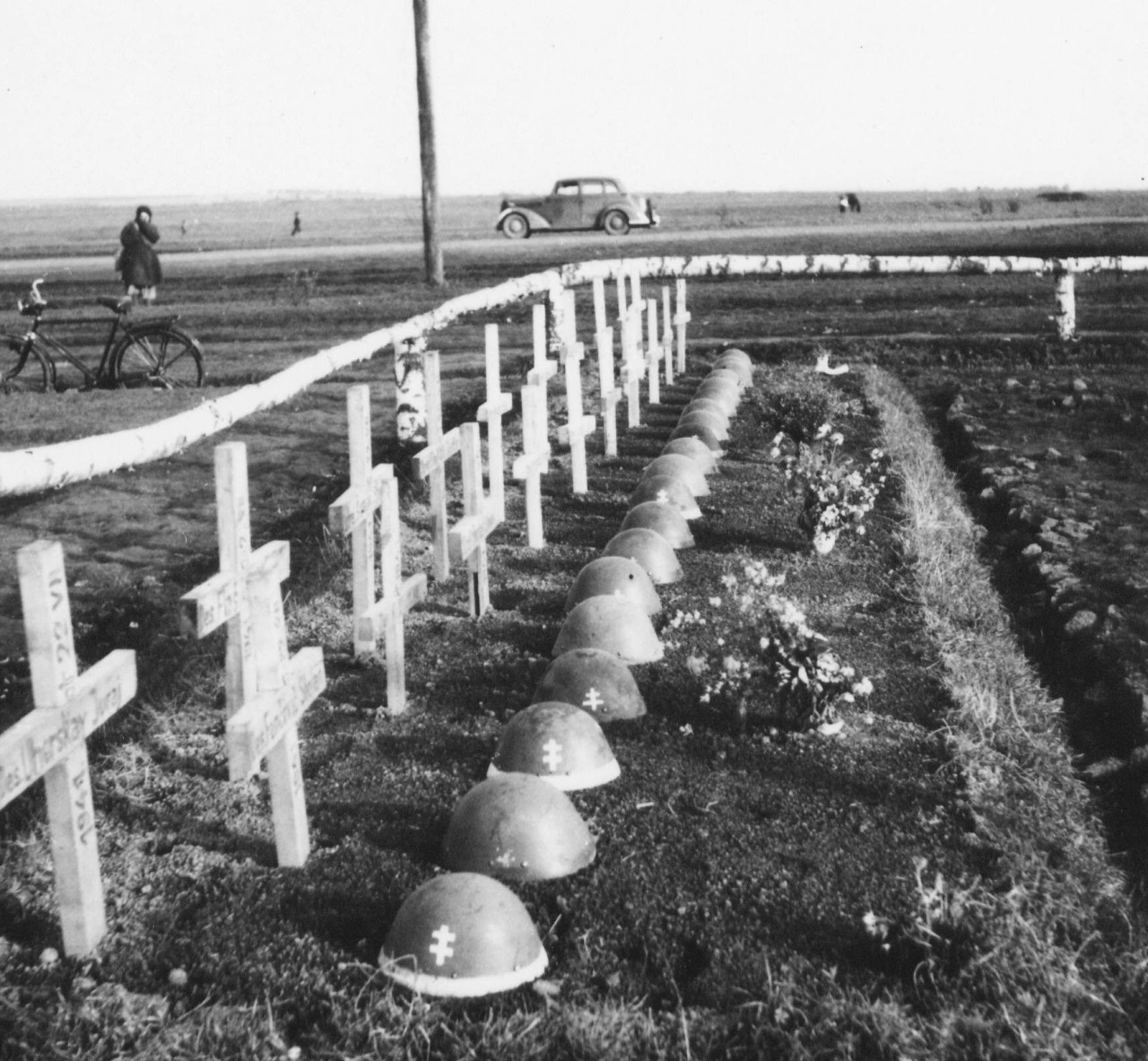
Temporary Slovak military cemetery near Lypovets, Ukrainian SSR, Soviet Union
