= 5th Luftwaffe Field Division =

5th Luftwaffe Field Division (5. Luftwaffen-Feld-Division)
- Active: 1942–1944
- Country: Nazi Germany
- Branch: Luftwaffe
- Type: Infantry
- Size: Division
- Engagements: World War II; Eastern Front; Battle of the Caucasus; Battle of the Dnieper; Dnieper–Carpathian Offensive

The 5th Luftwaffe Field Division (German: 5. Luftwaffen-Feld-Division) was an infantry division of the Luftwaffe branch of the Wehrmacht that fought in World War II. Formed using surplus Luftwaffe ground crew, it served on the Eastern Front from late 1942 to mid-1944, when it was disbanded.

== Operational history ==
The 5th Luftwaffe Field Division was one of several Luftwaffe divisions formed in 1942 from surplus ground crew and intended to serve as conventional infantry divisions. It was raised at Luftgau III (Berlin) at Troop Training Ground Gross-Born in October 1942, under the command of Generalmajor Hans-Joachim von Armin. (Note: The rank of generalmajor is equivalent to that of a brigadier general in the United States Army.)

The division comprised four battalions of infantry, a battalion of field artillery, a company of assault guns and engineer, signal and supply units. It was sent to the southern sector of the Eastern Front, under Army Group A where it served in the Caucasus. It soon withdrew in the face of the Soviet advance and was engaged in the fighting around the Kuban bridgehead from February to April 1943. It was evacuated to the Crimea the following month. In the spring of 1943 two planned infantry regiments for the division, Luftwaffen-Jager-Regiments 9 and 10, began forming in the Eastern Crimea and were to contain three Luftwaffe Jager battalions each.

In September 1943, the division was shifted north to Melitopol, on the Panther–Wotan line. During the Soviet Battle of the Dnieper, it suffered many casualties. Responsibility for the remnants of the division was transferred to the Heer (Army) on 1 November 1943, and it was renamed 5th Field Division (L). It was transferred to Romania for restructuring and refitting. Its infantry strength was reduced to two battalions, and it also received the staff of the 9th and 10th Jager Regiments (L). It was returned to the Eastern Front and attached to the Third Romanian Army. It fought in the Odessa Offensive until May 1944, when the division was disbanded. Its personnel were distributed among the 76th, 320th, and 335th infantry divisions.

== Commanders ==
- Generalmajor Hans-Joachim von Armin (October–November 1942);
- Oberst Hans-Bruno Schulz-Heym (December 1942 – November 1943);
- Generalmajor Both von Huelsen (March–June 1944). (Note: It is not clear who commanded the division during the period from December 1943 to February 1944. Ranks stated are those at the time of taking command.)

== Notes ==
Footnotes

Citations
