= Rettershof =

Crown domain of Fischbach, Kelkheim, Germany

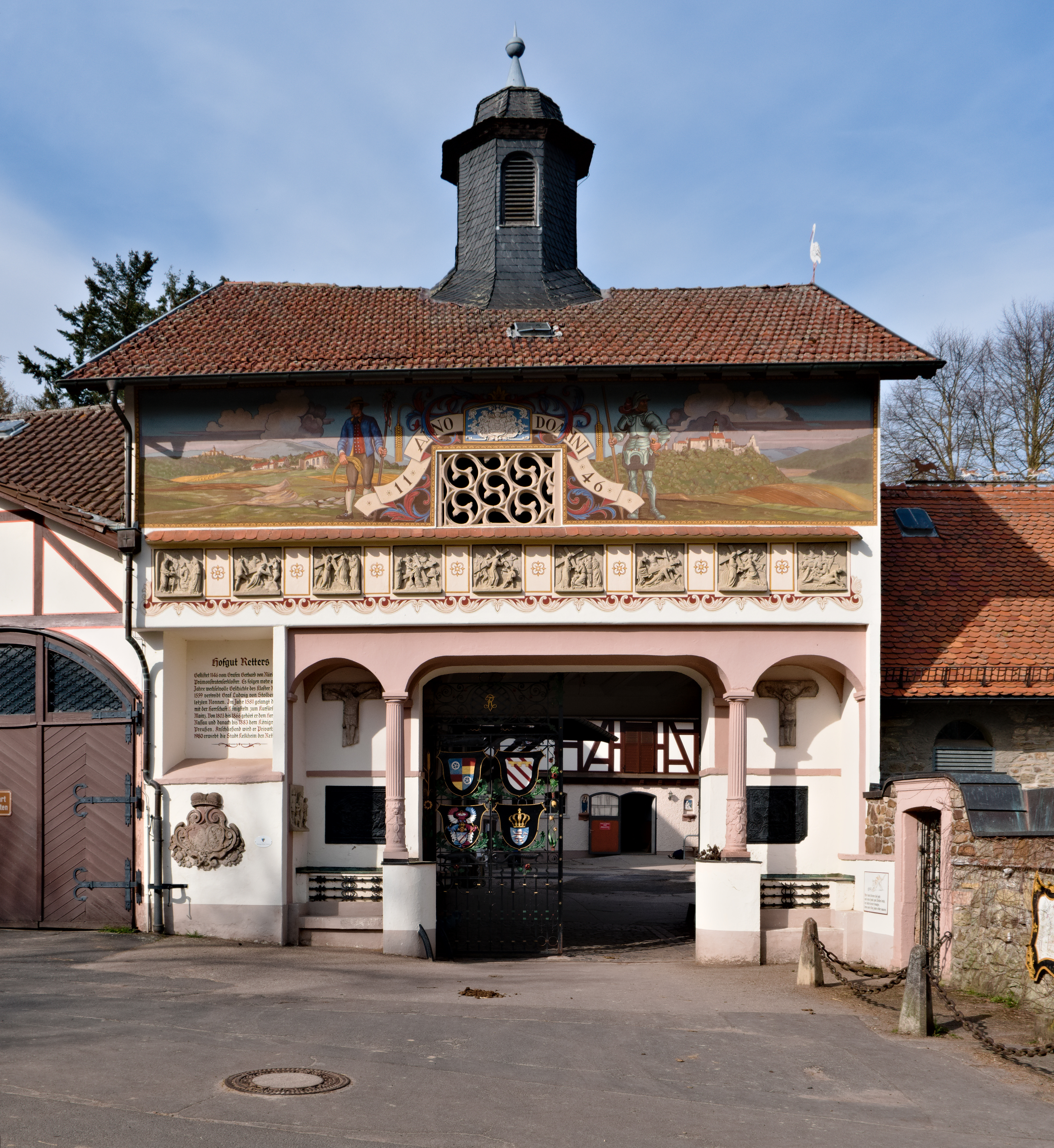
Entrance gate of the crown domain, built in 1936 in its present form

Rettershof (also Hof Retters or Röders) is a crown domain northeast of Fischbach, a district of Kelkheim in the Vordertaunus. It goes back to a former Premonstratensian monastery. From the 12th century until 1559, nuns were resident at Retters, and later various owners used the estate and its lands as a farmstead. Today, in addition to its continued agricultural use, Rettershof is a popular regional excursion destination.

== Location ==
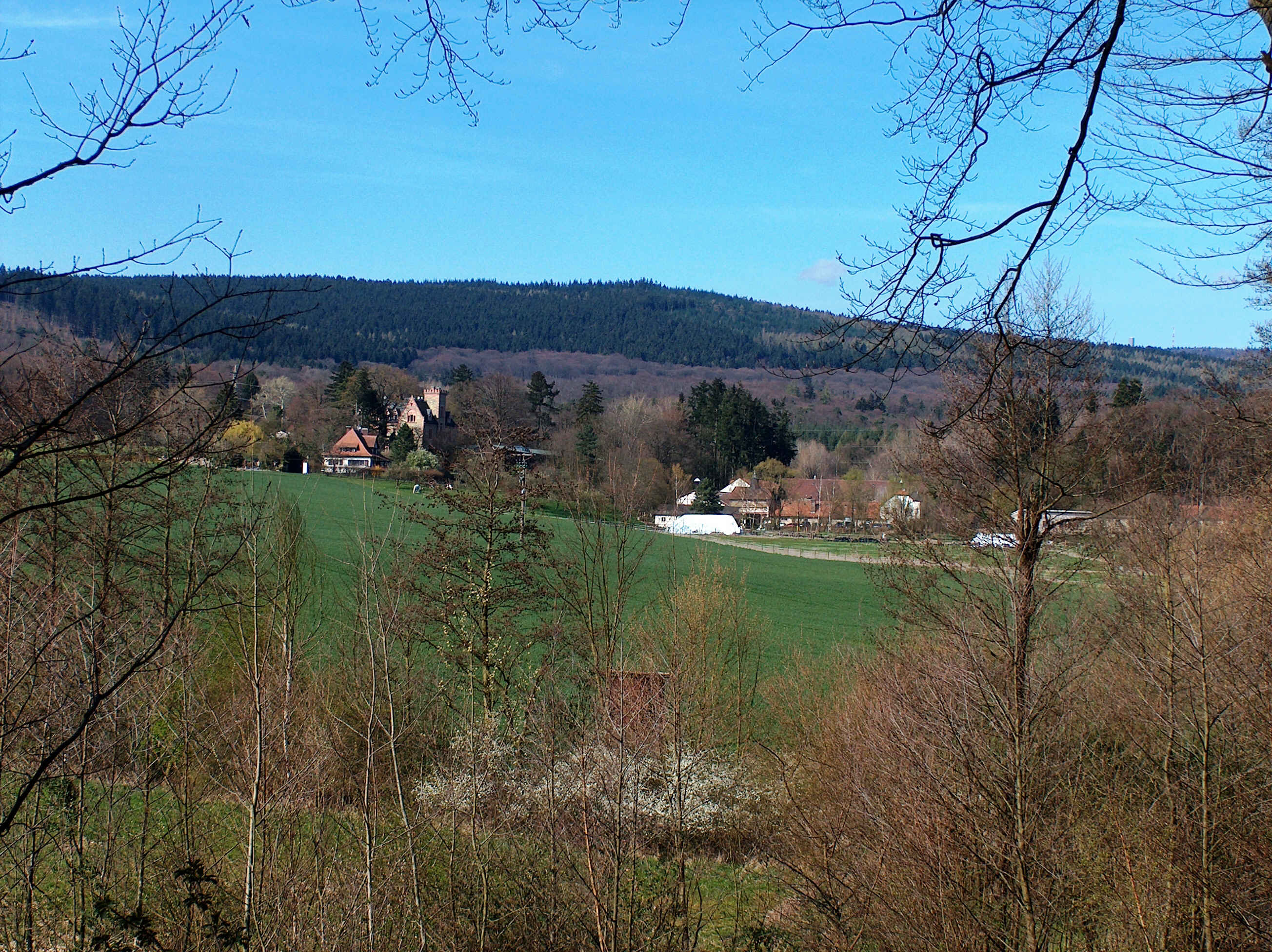
Big farm and Schlösschen from a hill in the south, in the foreground a tributary of the Rettersbach, in the background the mountain Steinkopf near Königstein (569.8 m a.s.l.)

Rettershof is located in the area of the Kelkheim district of Fischbach, about two kilometers northeast of the town center. It is located on the edge of the so-called Retterswald in a wide valley of the Krebsbach (tributary of the Fischbach, which drains into the Schwarzbach) extending west of it between Ruppertshain and Fischbach. In the immediate vicinity of the farm runs the Rettersbach, a left tributary of the Krebsbach. Today, farmland adjoins to the west and extensive woodland to the east. The Königstein district of Schneidhain begins about one kilometer to the northeast.

== Infrastructure ==
Numerous hiking trails lead across the site, there is the inn "Zum fröhlichen Landmann" and a large parking lot with access from the B 455 between Fischbach and Schneidhain. There is also a bus stop served by lines 263 and 815 of the Rhein-Main-Verkehrsverbund.

== History ==
=== Foundation and economic prosperity of the monastery (1146 to 1369) ===
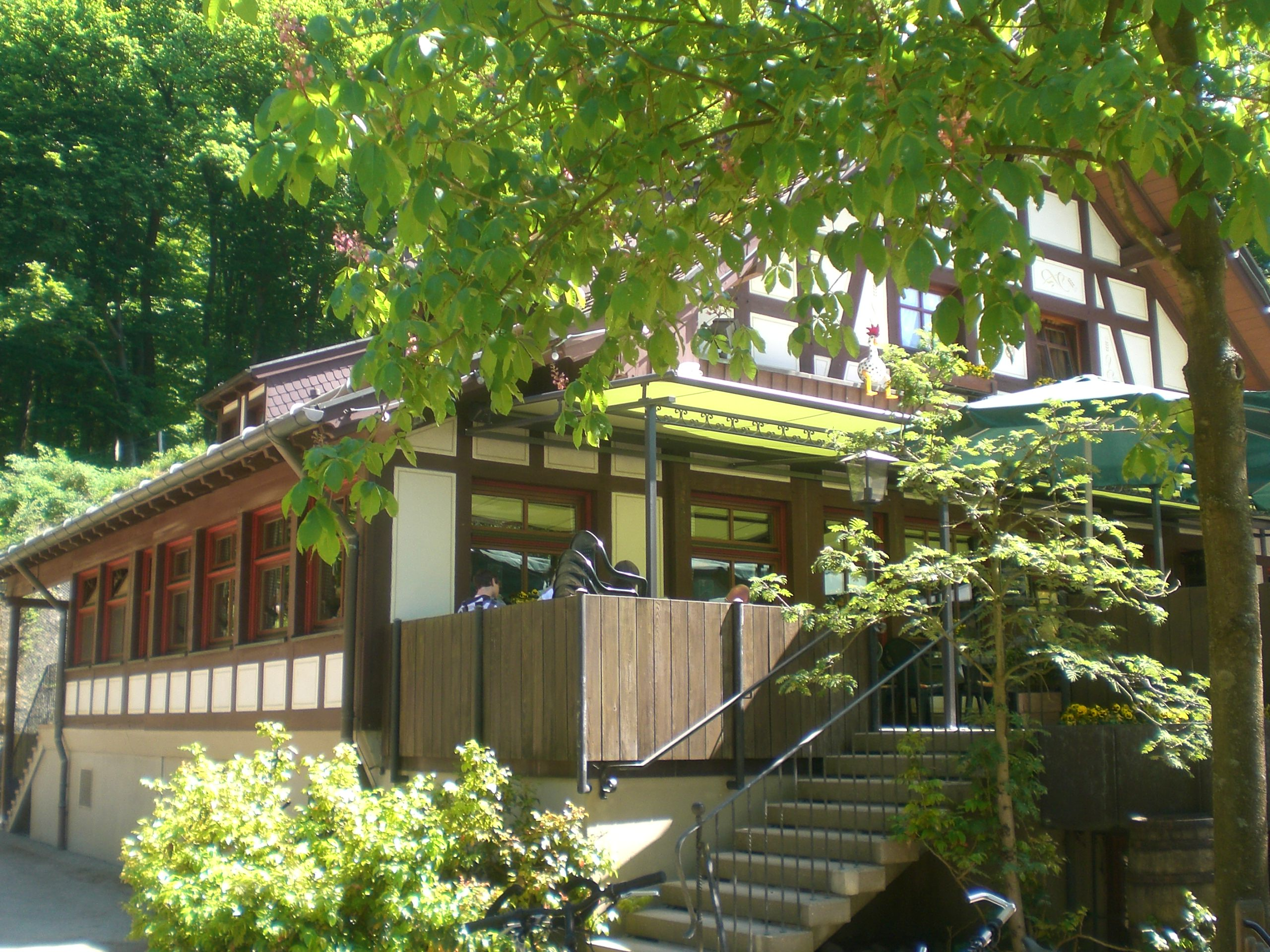
Inn "Zum fröhlichen Landmann"

Location of the property and dependent farms of Retters 1221: estates scattered far over Vordertaunus and Wetterau

Around 1136, the first choir women moved to Retters for economic reasons. The place name Retters derives from Council of God (= lat. Consilium Dei). The area was called Retters and Braubach - in reteresse et in brubach - and from then on also called Tal des heiligen Kreuzes - que nunc vallis sancte crucis apellatur. The choir women came from the monastery Steinbach in the Westerwald, which belonged to the Rommersdorf monastery near Neuwied. The lands extended as Retters over the meadows and pastures between Fischbach and Ruppertshain and Braubach as the valley of the Braubach running between Hornau and Schneidhain (the approximate location of the lands can be seen today at the Braubachweiher) and were owned by Count Gerhard of Nürings. As the last representative of his noble family, which mainly owned lands in the Wetterau, he donated his lands of Retters in 1146 in order to have an abby built on them. In a document from the year 1245 a monastery of the Order of Saint Augustine is reported. It is considered certain that from 1272 at the latest, Premonstratensians (an order that developed in the 12th century and likewise refers to the Rule of Saint Augustine) lived in Retters. Initially, Retters was a double monastery in which canons and nuns resided. From about 1200 on, there was only a pure nunnery, which mostly consisted of religious women of lower nobility.

Concentration of possessions in the Vordertaunus: Treisberg and Seelenberg in the Hintertaunus come under Retters' control through a donation

In later times, the legend spread that Gerhard of Nüringen, who fell into Arab captivity with 100 followers during the Second Crusade near Edessa and was held captive for two years, donated the monastery out of gratitude for his liberation. However, this contradicts the dating of the deed of donation of 13 November 1146, about a year before the start of the Second Crusade.

Since the completion of the monastery, the monastery church was dedicated to the Blessed Virgin Mary (first confirmed by documents in 1272). According to reports by the 17th century historian Petrus Diederichs, who lived in Retters, the church was also consecrated to St. Nicholas by the Archbishop of Mainz. From 1162 at the latest, Retters was subject to the Rommersdorf monastery, the oldest Premonstratensian monastery in the territory of the Archdiocese of Trier, as a filial monastery.

At that time, its protection was the responsibility of the Archbishop of Mainz. At first, it may have been a rather poor monastery cell, as can be seen from a record of the death of Burchard of Nürings, the brother of the monastery founder. However, through donations and trade with the surrounding dominions, the monastery soon gained influence, so that an economic upswing quickly set in. In a letter from the Archbishop of Mainz, Conrad I of Wittelsbach, in 1191, 22 estates in the Vordertaunus and in the Wetterau were already listed, to which he guaranteed protection as Retters' property. In the following centuries, the monastery concentrated its possessions on the Vordertaunus; lands further away were sold or exchanged for surrounding areas.

From another letter of protection from the Archbishop of Mainz, Siegfried II of Eppstein, dated 30 December 1221, it can be seen that Retters owned estates in 40 places between Wiesbaden, Frankfurt and Butzbach, among them as the most important estates Münster, Hornau (both today Kelkheim districts), Beidenau (today a deserted village), Schneidhain and Liederbach. In total, Retters had 24 farms, two mills, 67 hectares of land (equivalent to about 407 hectares, mostly forest and meadows), 66 acres (about 13 hectares) of self-managed fields and 20 vineyards at that time. In addition, there were farms subject to ground rent as well as the patronage over the parish church of Dornheim (from 1191 to 1559, near Groß-Gerau).

On 13 September 1275 the Roman-German King Rudolf I, descended from the House of Habsburg, placed Retters under the protection of the Empire. During this period of economic prosperity, the number of nuns had to be limited to a maximum of 50, as more women sought admission to the monastery than it could provide for.

During these years, the mystic Christina of Retters (born 1269, died 1291 or 1292, later beatified) also contributed to the fame of the monastery because of her name. Nevertheless, it is questionable whether she ever worked at Retters.

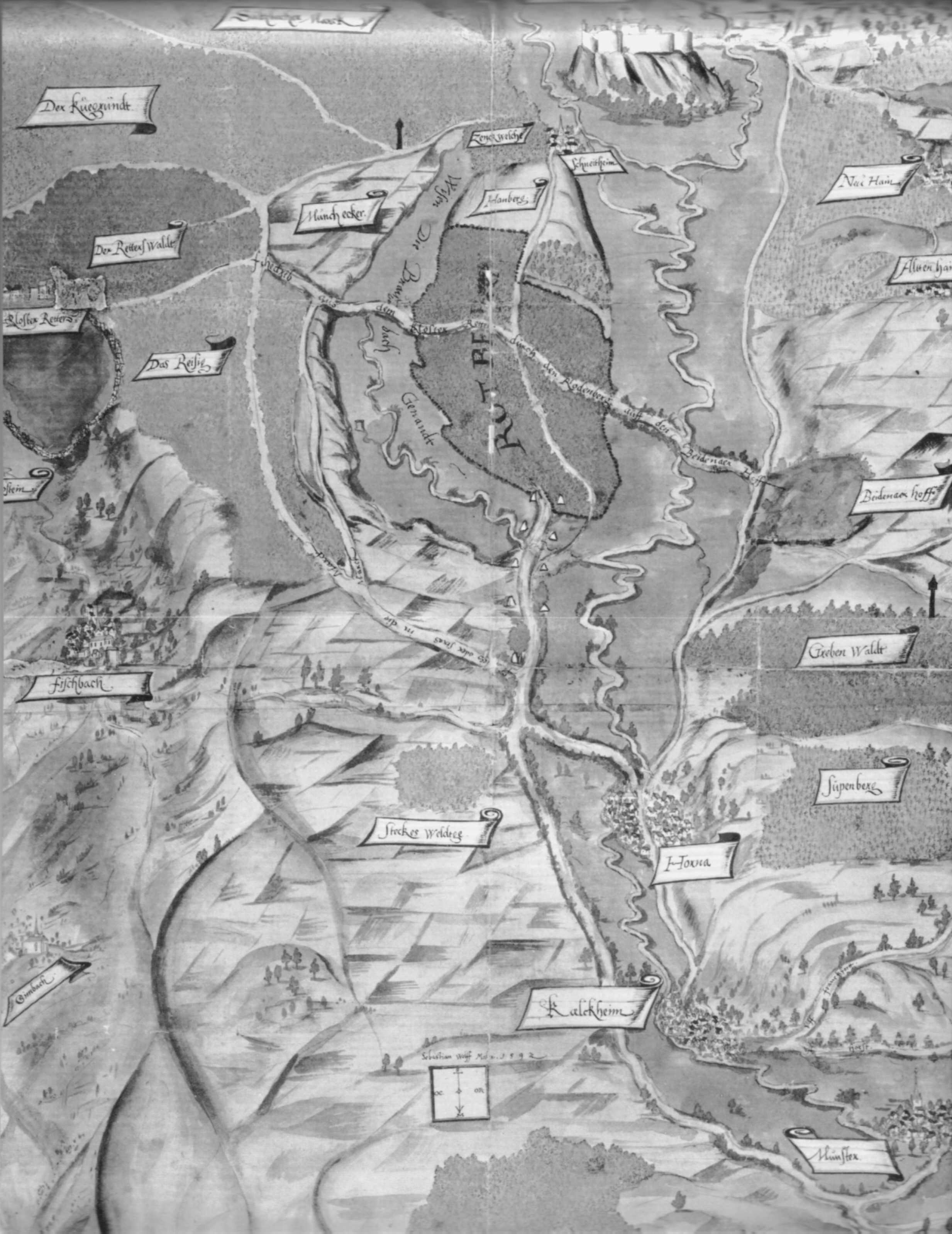
Map from 1592, made after the sale of Retters.

In the 13th century, the lords of Eppstein closely bound Retters Monastery to themselves. In 1272, it received the lands of Treisberg and Seelenberg as a donation from Gottfried (the Elder) of Eppstein. On 13 May 1297 the Archbishop of Mainz, Gerhard II, who came from the house of Eppstein, remitted his dues to the monastery. In the 14th century the monastery then became increasingly dependent on the Eppstein lords and was soon regarded by them as a proprietary church in its own right. The lords of Eppstein were henceforth monastery lords of Retters, but the right of investiture and the spiritual leadership continued to be incumbent on Rommershausen monastery.

=== Decline and dissolution of the monastery (1369 to 1559) ===
1559 at the dissolution of the monastery: almost only estates in the Vordertaunus region

In the middle of the 14th century, a massive economic decline began, accompanied by the sale of goods. Plague, population decline and wars had a negative impact on trade and monastery operations. In addition, Retters was repeatedly caught between the fronts during various feuds, and in 1374 it was plundered by Reifenberg robber barons. In 1369, a substantial part of the property had to be surrendered with the possessions of Treisberg, which were sold for 200 gulden to Frank VIII of Cronberg. Now mainly the remaining lands in the surroundings were cultivated from Retters itself, with the exception of Beidenau no farms were dependent on the monastery anymore. From 1350 to 1507 Retters was subject to the Free Imperial City of Frankfurt's army and in case of war was involved in the defense of the city and the surrounding countryside.

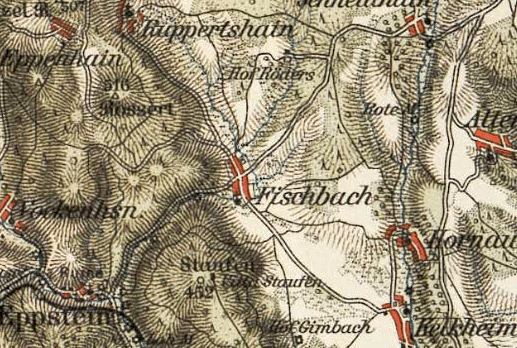
Hof Röders (today Rettershof) northeast of Fischbach, map from 1893

In 1433, the House of Eppstein split into the lines of Eppstein-Münzenberg (formerly Falkenstein-Münzenberg, as it was based in Falkenstein) and Eppstein-Königstein, which Retters henceforth administered as a joint property. Due to disputes between the two branches of the family, the monastery increasingly fell into economic hardship, hunger and neglect spread. Around 1500, about 20 people still lived in Retters. When Eberhard IV, the last Count of Eppstein and patron of Retters, died in 1535 without leaving any descendants, the monastery and its lands fell to the Lords of Stolberg, as had been decided when his sister Anna married Botho of Stolberg.

After Botho died in 1538, his sons divided his property among themselves in an inheritance settlement on 26 August 1538. Retters was assigned to the new head of the family, Ludwig of Stolberg-Königstein (he resided in Königstein). Ludwig had been converted to the Lutheran doctrine by his brother Christoph zu Stolberg, the provost of Halberstadt.

Starting in 1540, Ludwig introduced the Reformation throughout his county and began to dissolve monasteries and convents. In 1542 and 1544 the plague raged in the Vordertaunus, Retters was also affected, more than half of the nuns died. Piece by piece, the lords of Stolberg released the best lands from the possession of the monastery, which was increasingly in dissolution and so weakened by high debts, mismanagement and a large number of resignations that disease and hunger broke out again and again and money for urgently needed repairs was lacking.

After disputes with the tenant of the Beidenau farm, Konrad of Hattstein, who had complained about the poor conditions to Count Ludwig, the latter finally seized Beidenau and enfeoffed the previous tenant with this estate. Thus, the monastery also lost its last large property.

After the death of the last abbess Anna of Riedesel on 27 September 1559, the women's convent was dissolved in the name of Ludwig of Stolberg-Königstein. His Königstein Amtmann, Christof of Hattstein, confiscated all seals and documents immediately after the death of the abbess and urged the unsettled choir women to sign a deed of cession to the House of Stolberg. While Rommersdorf monastery was still convening a commission to appoint a new abbess, the bailiff had the convent evacuated on 23 October 1559, despite the protests of the remaining nuns. The three remaining nuns were finally forced to leave Retters, but were promised an annuity of 25 gulden per year by Ludwig. Subsequently, Rommersdorf monastery tried several times without success to regain its expropriated daughter monastery, pointing out the illegality of the deed of cession (the nuns were not authorized to sign such a contract).

=== Retters as a sovereign crown domain (1559 to 1883) ===
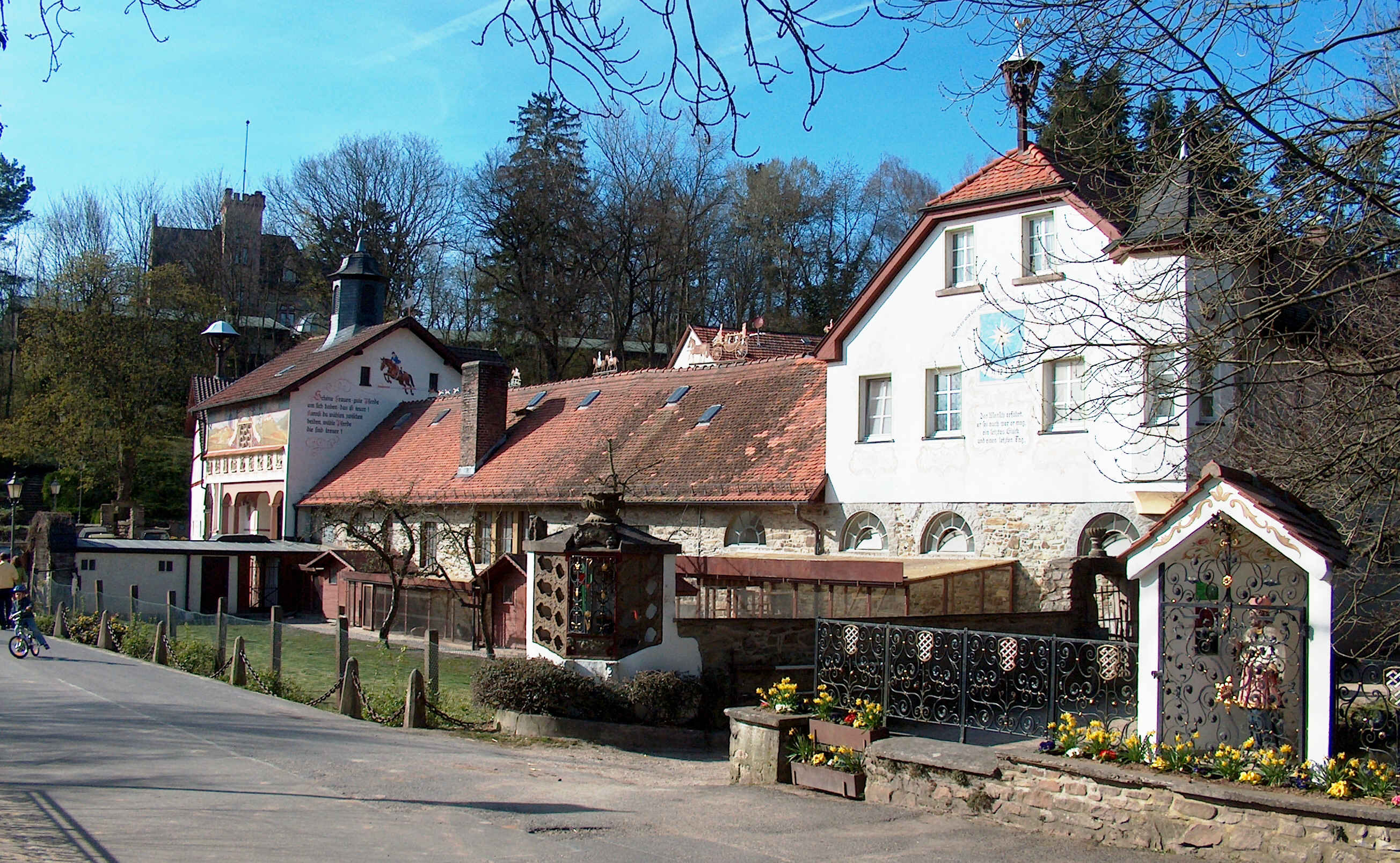
Main facade of the manor from the south, in the background on the hill the Schlösschen

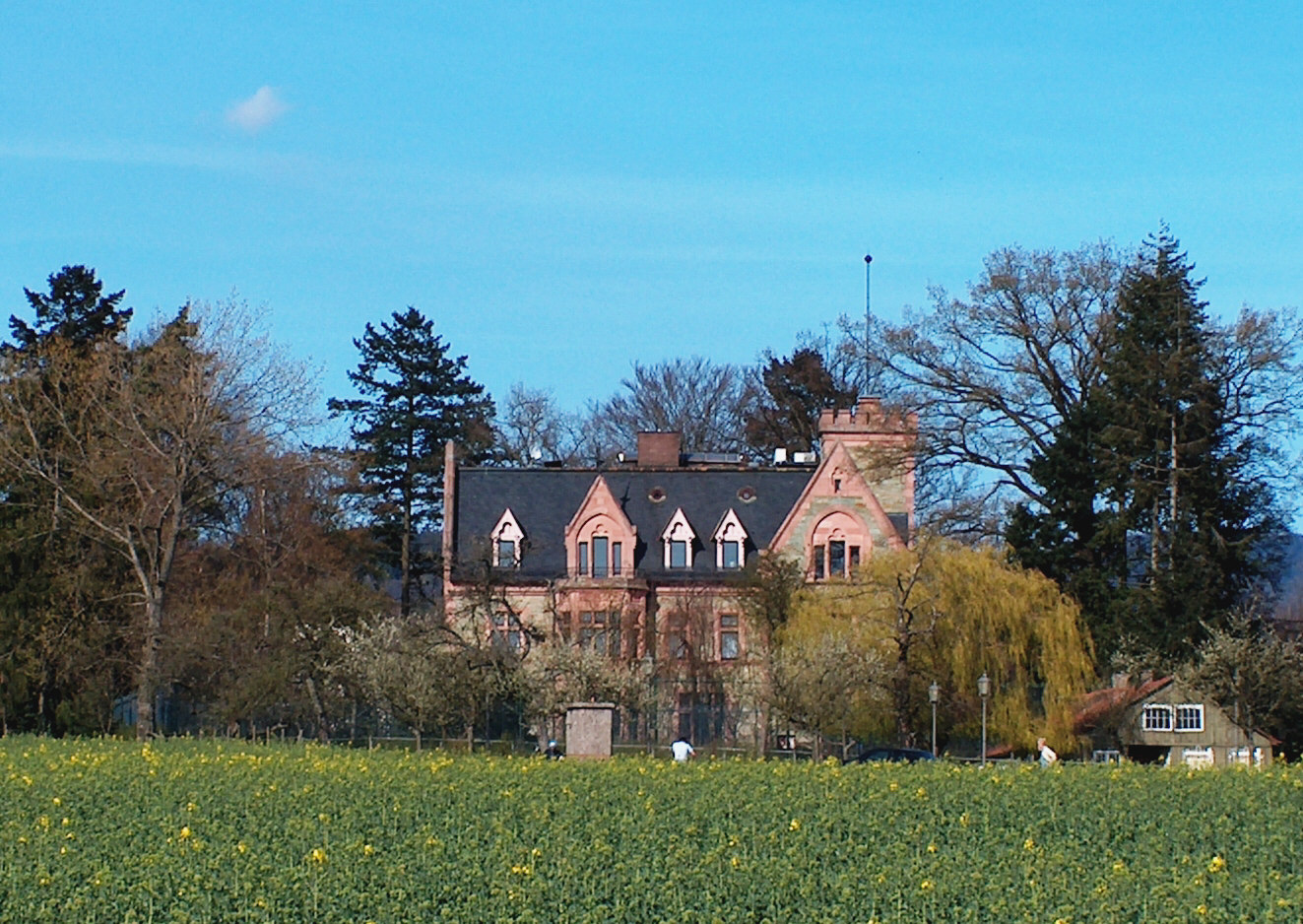
Schlösschen built in 1884 in the Tudor style from the west

Under the rule of the Lords of Stolberg, Retters was used as a tenant farm. After Ludwig's death in 1574, his property fell to his younger brother Christoph. In 1581, he bequeathed his possessions in the Vordertaunus, including Retters, to the Frankfurt Bartholomaeusstift, which shortly thereafter passed them on to the Electorate of Mainz for 1200 florins. The newly acquired territories were administered by the Königstein office, and the Lutheran doctrine was soon pushed back again in the course of the Counter-Reformation. During the Thirty Years' War, imperial troops plundered the farm and burned it down. Subsequently, the estate was rebuilt and farmed by various tenants. In 1792, French troops conquered Mainz during the War of the First Coalition and occupied the entire area on the left bank of the Rhine in 1797 after the Treaty of Campo Formio. In 1803, the occupying forces dissolved the clerical electorate within the framework of secularization, and the Hofgut as well as large parts of the Mainz property in the Vordertaunus region were awarded to the principality of Nassau-Usingen. Nassau-Usingen and Nassau-Weilburg merged in 1806 to form the Duchy of Nassau. From then on, Retters, which was now often referred to as Röders in a modified form, continued to exist as a state domain. After the dissolution of the Duchy of Nassau in 1866, Rettershof fell to Prussia.

=== Rettershof since 1884 ===
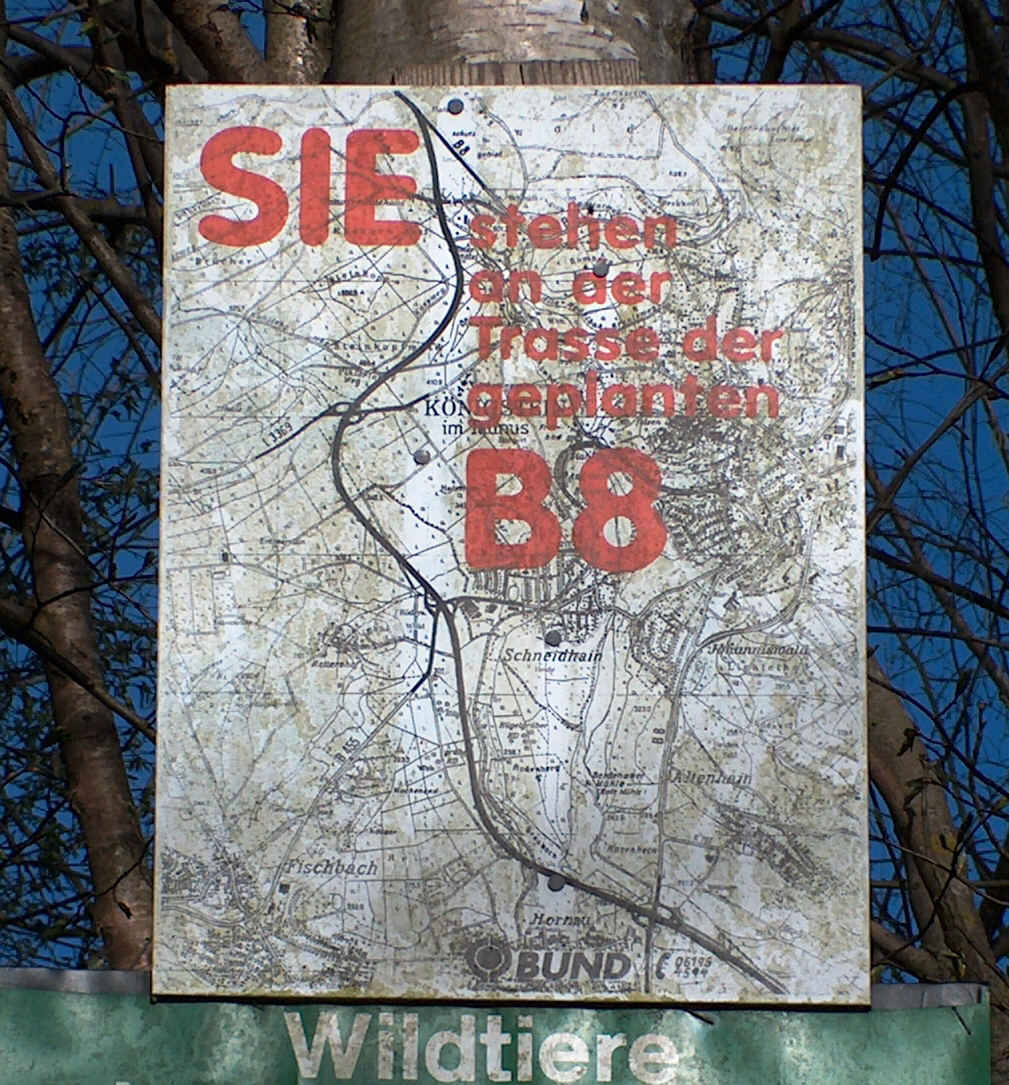
Protest poster of the B.U.N.D. against the extension of the federal highway 8 near Rettershof

In 1883, the German-English nobleman Frederik Arnold Rodewald zu Feldheim acquired the Rettershof from the Prussian state for 78,000 gold marks and redeemed the hereditary loan. In 1885, he had a representative Tudor-style castle built on a hill to the north of the farm, which was to serve as the residence of his daughter Alice and her husband Oskar Freiherr of Dieskau. When the latter died in the same year, Alice married his brother Leopold and, after the death of her father in 1886, took over the management of the estate together with her second husband. However, the lands, which had been greatly reduced in size compared to the estates in the Middle Ages, were not sufficient to operate the Rettershof economically as a luxury estate with an attached castle. Finally, the owners sold the estate in 1903 for 210,000 gold marks to the wealthy Baron of Vincke and his wife Sibylle of Hesse.

In 1924, Felix of Richter acquired the farm and established it as the ancestral home of his family, which henceforth called itself Richter-Rettershof. In order to increase profitability, he looked for sideline opportunities. In 1928, a ladies' riding school with an attached boarding school began operations, for which the riding arena still in use today was built. In the 1930s, a restaurant, which still exists today, opened a little away from the farm. During the 1920s and 1930s, Felix of Richter-Rettershof and his wife Hertha had extensive renovations and alterations made to the Hofgut. Hertha of Richter-Rettershof was a native of vom Rath, whose maternal grandfather, Carl Friedrich Wilhelm Meister, was one of the co-founders of Farbwerke Hoechst, later Hoechst AG. Her sister Hanna was the wife of the conductor and art critic Paul Bekker as well as the founder of the Frankfurt Art Cabinet; another sister, Eugenie vom Rath, was the mother of the CDU politician Walther Leisler Kiep.

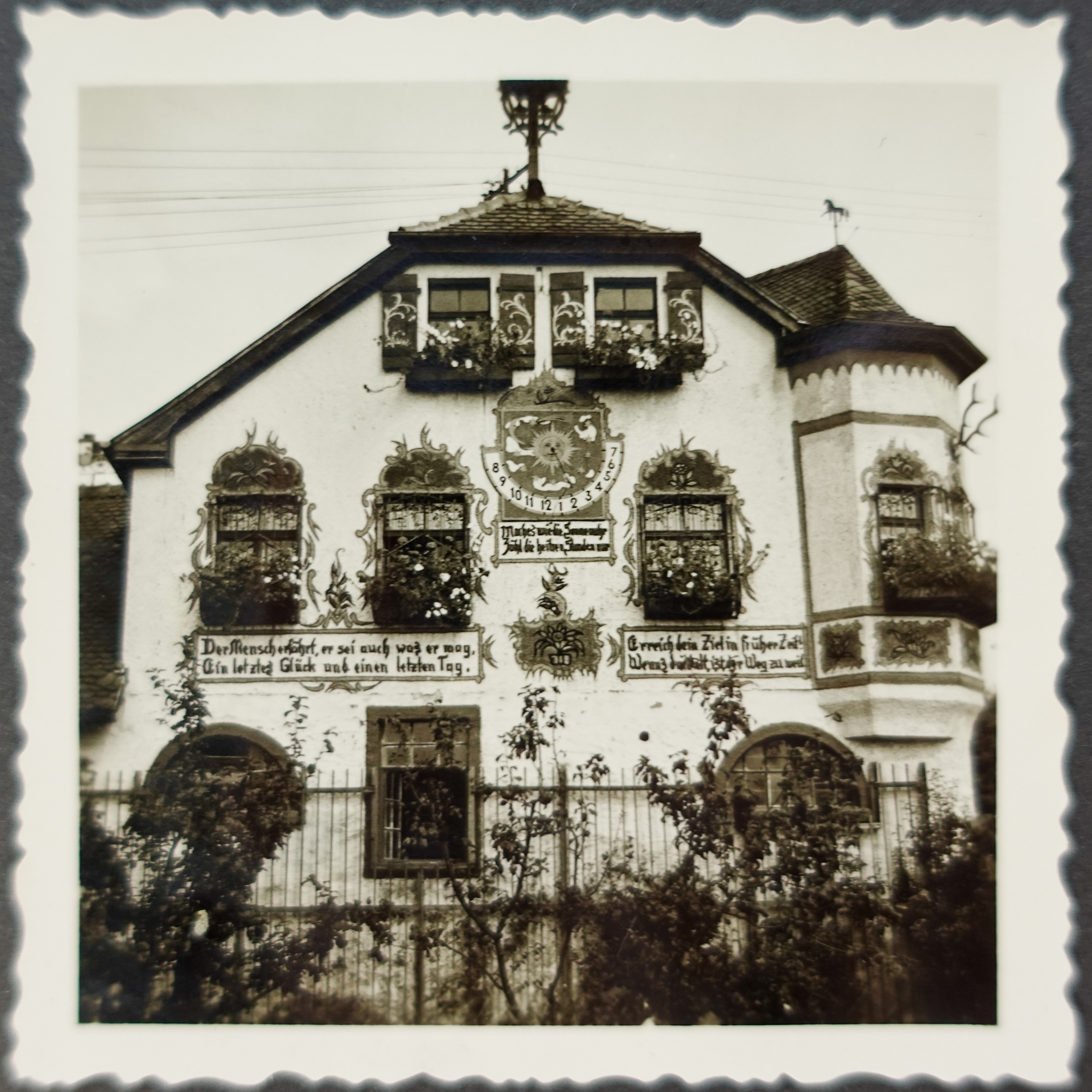
Historically valuable photo of the facade of the Rettershof from July 1954 with a sundial and clever sayings in old German letters.

After World War II, the U.S. Army requisitioned the castle and used it as a representative office until 1953. After that, the Gehlen Organization, the predecessor organization of the Federal Intelligence Service, took up residence in the building for a short time. From the mid-1950s, a private language school was located here. The estate continued to be managed by the Richter-Rettershof family, and after the death of Felix of Richter-Rettershof by his daughter Felicitas Bienzle. In 1973–1980, the German headquarters of the Hare Krishna Movement (ISKCON) had its headquarters and a temple there as tenants of the manor.

When the Richter-Rettershof family finally decided to sell the estate at the end of the 1970s, the town of Kelkheim took over the entire property with the castle and estate as well as around 110 hectares of land for nine million DM on 1 January 1980. Subsequently, the city of Kelkheim lavishly converted the listed castle into a hotel and financed the costly renovation of the aging estate. The city-owned Gutsverwaltung Rettershof GmbH was founded to operate the estate. Since then, the Rettershof has been used as an equestrian farm and for cultural events. The plan to build a golf course around the stud farm, which emerged in the 1990s, failed in 1997 due to the veto of Kelkheim citizens in a referendum. Starting in the 1970s, the construction of a four-lane bypass of the Bundesstraße 8 to relieve Kelkheim and Königstein was under discussion; according to the plans, the route would have run in the immediate vicinity of Rettershof. In December 2009, the controversial project was finally stopped by the Regional Assembly of Southern Hesse.

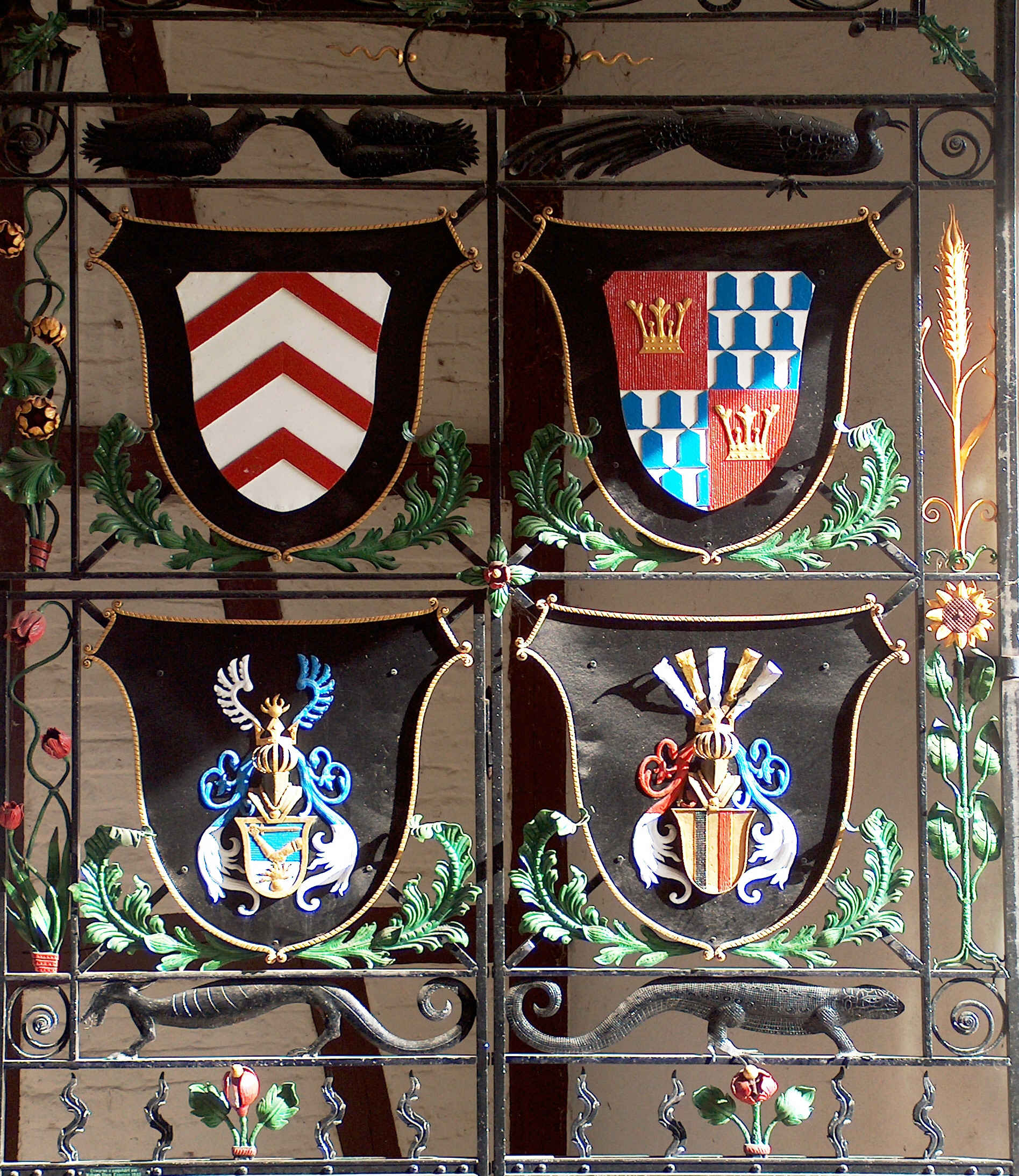
Right half of the cast-iron gate from 1932: coats of arms of the Lords of Eppstein (top left), the Lords of Cronberg (top right) and the Richter-Rettershof couple (bottom) - coats of arms of the Richter family (Felix, bottom left) and the Rath family (Hertha, bottom right)

On the night of 3-4 July 2018, parts of the roof truss and part of the stables of the Rettershof were destroyed as a result of a major fire. The cause of the fire is unknown to date.

== Architecture and artistic decoration ==
=== Retters Monastery ===
At the time of the monastery existed the manor and a small chapel. The place where the chapel was located is believed to be on the north side of the present riding arena opposite the farm gate, according to finds made during construction work in 1939. Of the original buildings, only the foundation walls remained after the destruction during the Thirty Years' War, most of which were removed over the years and partly used to construct the new buildings. There is still a cellar vault below the courtyard, which could date back to the times of the monastery. In addition, remains of an old wall were found in the forest east of the farm, the course of which coincides with the former monastery wall.

=== Retters crown domain ===
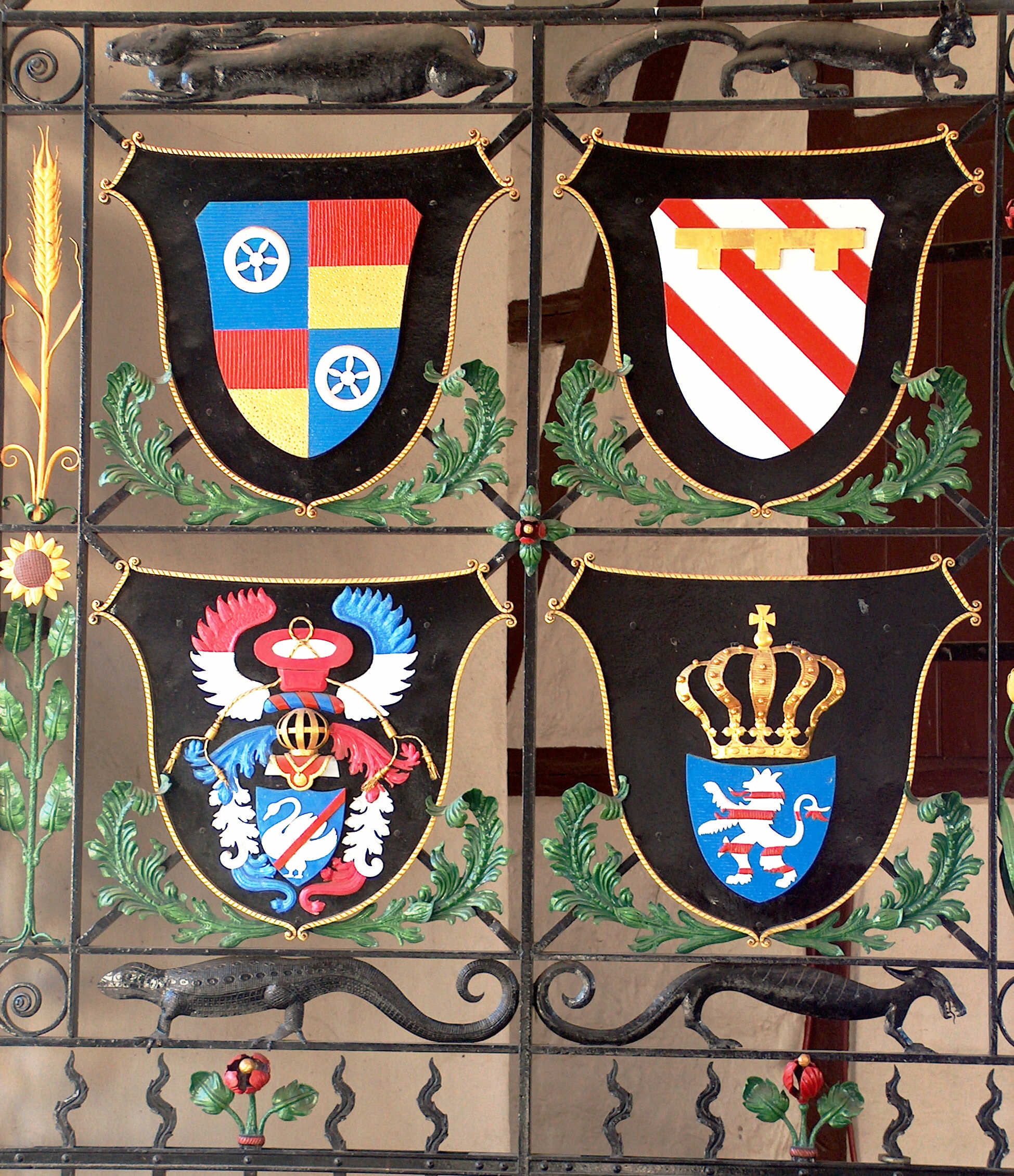
Left half of gate: coats of arms of the House of Falkenstein-Münzenberg (top left), the Lords of Reifenberg (plunderers of Retters in 1374, top right), the Lords of Dieskau (bottom left) and the House of Hesse (in memory of Sybille of Hesse; right).

The farmstead in half-timbered construction as a four-sided farmstead was built in its present form in the style of historicism in the 1920s and 1930s under the leadership of the Richter-Rettershof family. The finishing touch was the gatehouse built in 1936 with rich decorations on the facade as well as the coats of arms of the various historical lordships and noble houses connected with Retters, which are embedded in the wrought-iron gate from 1932. Most of the decorations on the walls of the manor, mostly facade sayings on the theme of horses and riding, come directly from Felix and Hertha of Richter-Rettershof, who began to decorate the manor with ornaments of this kind in the 1930s. The abundant hunting trophies and other ornaments, including figures of saints and heraldic stones, also date from this period. In addition, some purpose-built buildings were subsequently erected, somewhat off the beaten track, for farming purposes. In 2000, a large indoor riding arena was added to the east of the stud farm.

=== Schlösschen ===
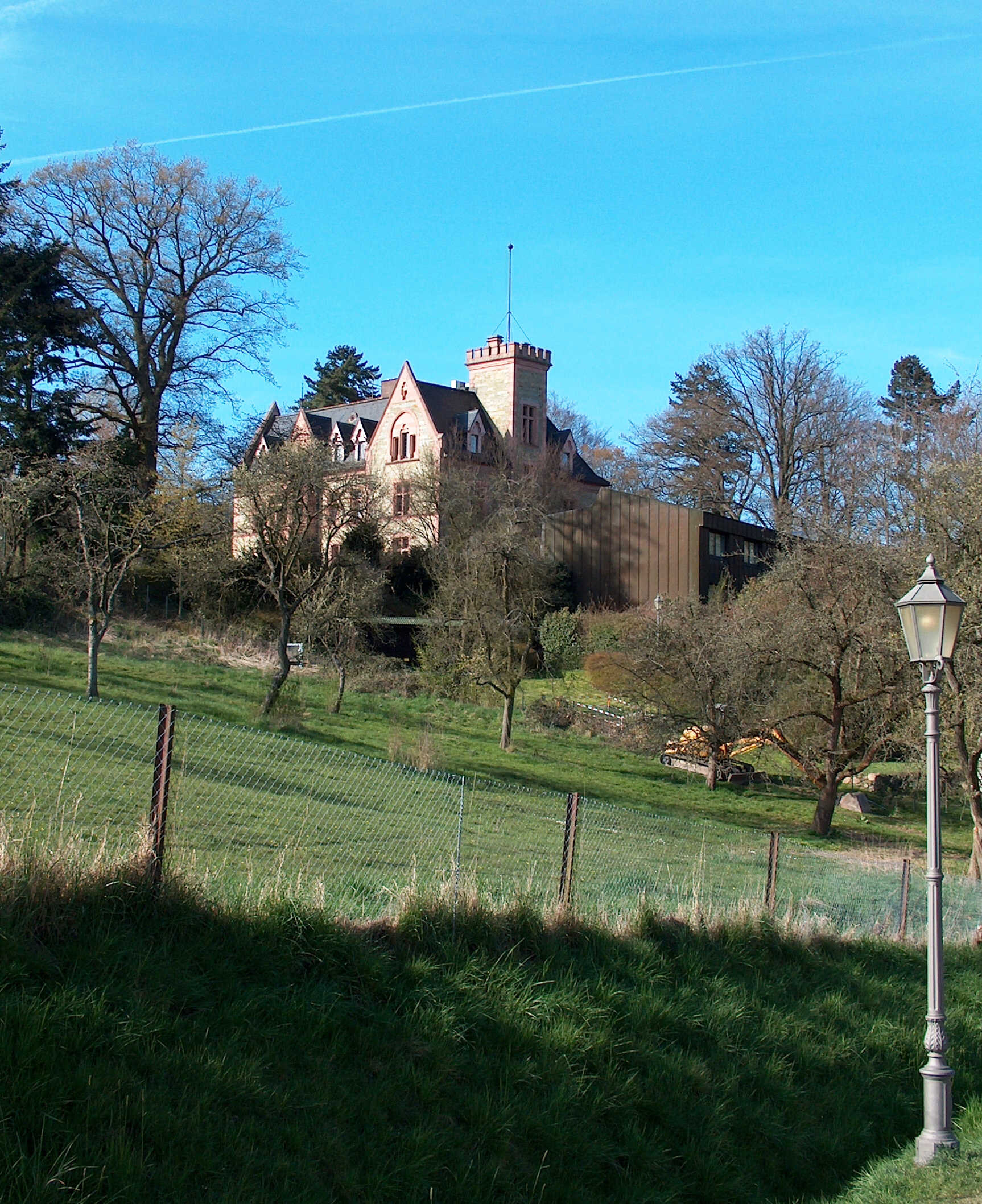
Schlösschen, now used as a hotel, from the south, in the foreground the bronze-colored annexes of the hotel wing

The castle was built in 1884, initially as the residence of the Barons of Dieskau in the English Tudor style on a hill north of the estate. Sandstone and stone from the Vordertaunus served as building material. After it was used by changing owners, the city of Kelkheim converted it into a hotel in the early 1980s. For this purpose, a bronze-clad hotel wing with 35 guest rooms was added to the south-facing slope, which is connected to the main building via a glass connecting passage. The new domicile was opened in 1984 as Schlosshotel Rettershof. Since 1983, the castle has been on the list of cultural monuments for cultural property of the state of Hesse.

== Persons associated with the Rettershof ==
- Edwin Graf von Rothkirch und Trach (1888-1980) a former general of the cavalry and show jumper, died at Rettershof.

== Bibliography ==
- Albert Hardt: Urkundenbuch der Klöster Altenberg, Dorlar, Retters, Niederbreitbach-Wolfenacker 2000, pp. 782–840
- Dietrich Kleipa: Kelkheim/Taunus. Ein Streifzug durch die Geschichte der Stadt. Herausgegeben vom Magistrat der Stadt Kelkheim, 1968
- Bock, Dr. Hartmut/ Kleipa, Dietrich/ Zimmermann, Heinz: Kelkheim im Taunus. Beiträge zur Geschichte seiner Stadtteile. Herausgegeben vom Magistrat der Stadt Kelkheim, 1980 (pp. 34–80)
- Adolf Guba (Hrsg.): Kelkheim im Taunus. Druckerei Blei & Guba, Kelkheim/Taunus 1995 (pp. 22–25) ISBN 3-00-000369-X
- Jörg Brückner (2005), Zwischen Reichsstandschaft und Standesherrschaft. Die Grafen zu Stolberg und ihr Verhältnis zu den Landgrafen von Thüringen und späteren Herzögen, Kurfürsten bzw. Königen von Sachsen 1210–1815, Verlag Janos Stekovics, ISBN 3-89923-119-8 (Informationen über das Geschlecht Eppstein-Stolberg)
