= 330th Division =

330th Division may refer to:

- 330th Infantry Division, Wehrmacht, Germany
- 330th Rifle Division, Soviet Union

== See also ==
- List of military divisions by number
