= 367th Infantry Division =

- German: 367. Infanterie-Division
- Active: November 1943- March 1945
- Country: Nazi Germany
- Branch: Army
- Type: Infantry
- Size: Division
- Engagements: World War II: anti-partisan operations in Croatia; Battle of Königsberg

The 367th Infantry Division (German: 367. Infanterie-Division) was a German infantry division in World War II.

== History ==
It was formed on 11 November 1943 in Zagreb, Independent State of Croatia from personnel of the 330th Infantry Division and new recruits born in 1926, as part of the 21st Aufstellungswelle.

The 277th Infantry Division was assigned to 2nd Panzer Army from early December 1943 until late March 1944, having been placed there after pressure by Oberbefehlshaber Südost on OKW to strengthen the 2nd Panzer Army with additional forces. The addition of forces was intended to reverse gains made by the National Liberation Army since the announcement of the Armistice of Cassibile on 8 September 1943, after which the Royal Italian Army had largely ceased fighting against the Yugoslav partisans.

Subsequently, the division was transferred to the Eastern Front in Ukraine in the Brody sector with the 1st Panzer Army. Later, it became part of the 4th Army in Army Group Centre and fought in Poland around Białystok and Augustów. The division ended up in East Prussia, where she was wiped out during the Battle of Königsberg in March 1945.

== Commanding officers ==
- Generalleutnant Georg Zwade, (15 November 1943 – 10 May 1944)
- Generalmajor Adolf Fischer, (10 May 1944 – 1 August 1944)
- Generalleutnant Hermann Hähnle. (1 August 1944 – March 1945).
