= Adolf Fischer (officer) =

WWII Nazi German general

- Born: 23 July 1893
- Died: 23 October 1947 (aged 54); Belgrade, Yugoslavia
- Military career
- Allegiance: Nazi Germany
- Branch: Army
- Service years: 1914–1920; 1936–1945
- Rank: Generalmajor
- Commands: 367th Infantry Division
- Conflicts: World War II
- Awards: Knight's Cross of the Iron Cross

Adolf Fischer (23 July 1893 – 23 October 1947) was a general in the Wehrmacht of Nazi Germany during World War II. He was a recipient of the Knight's Cross of the Iron Cross. Fischer surrendered to the Yugoslavian troops in May 1945. He was charged with war crimes, convicted and executed on the 23rd of October, 1947.

== Awards and decorations ==
- Knight's Cross of the Iron Cross on 4 May 1944 as Oberst and commander of Grenadier-Regiment 459

== Notes ==
Military offices
Preceded by Generalmajor Georg Zwade	Commander of 367. Infanterie-Division; 10 May 1944 – 1 August 1944	Succeeded by Generalleutnant Hermann Hähnle (general)
