= Kurt Ebener =

German Luftwaffe fighter ace

- Born: 4 May 1920; Könitz/Saalfeld, Germany
- Died: 7 May 1975 (aged 55); Fischbach (Taunus), West Germany
- Military career
- Allegiance: Nazi Germany
- Branch: Luftwaffe
- Service years: 1939–1945
- Rank: Oberleutnant (first lieutenant)
- Units: JG 3, JG 11
- Commands: 5./JG 11
- Conflicts: See battles World War II: Siege of Malta; Eastern Front; Battle of Stalingrad; Western Front; Defence of the Reich
- Awards: Knight's Cross of the Iron Cross

Kurt Ebener (4 May 1920 – 7 May 1975) was a Luftwaffe fighter ace and recipient of the Knight's Cross of the Iron Cross during World War II. The Knight's Cross of the Iron Cross, and its variants were the highest awards in the military and paramilitary forces of Nazi Germany during World War II. Ebener was credited with 57 victories in 150 missions, 52 over the Eastern Front.

== Career ==
Ebener was born on 4 May 1920 in Könitz, present-day a municipality of Unterwellenborn, at the time in Thuringia of the Weimar Republic. He volunteered for military service in the Luftwaffe on 17 November 1939. Following completion of flight and fighter pilot training, (Note: Flight training in the Luftwaffe progressed through the levels A1, A2 and B1, B2, referred to as A/B flight training. A training included theoretical and practical training in aerobatics, navigation, long-distance flights and dead-stick landings. The B courses included high-altitude flights, instrument flights, night landings and training to handle the aircraft in difficult situations.) was posted to 4. Staffel (4th squadron) of Jagdgeschwader 3 "Udet" (JG 3—3rd Fighter Wing) on 1 December 1941. The Staffel was subordinated to II. Gruppe (2nd group) of JG 3 and based at Wiesbaden-Erbenheim Airfield and preparing for deployment to Mediterranean theater. At the time, 4. Staffel was commanded by Oberleutnant Walther Dahl while II. Gruppe was headed by Hauptmann Karl-Heinz Krahl.

In early January 1942, II. Gruppe received orders to relocate to Sicily where the II. Fliegerkorps (2nd Air Corps) concentrated forces during the Siege of Malta. On 18 January, the first aircraft from 4. Staffel arrived at Comiso Airfield. On 25 April, the Gruppe flew its last mission to Malta, escorting bombers.

=== War against the Soviet Union ===
On 27 April 1942, II. Gruppe arrived at Pilsen, present-day Plzeň, following their deployment to the Mediterranean theater. The Gruppe was then placed under the command of Hauptmann Kurt Brändle after its formed commander Krahl had been killed in action. During the next three weeks, the Gruppe underwent a period of maintenance and overhaul before on 18 May began deploying to the southern sector of the Eastern Front. Too late to participate in the Battle of the Kerch Peninsula, it was located on the left wing of Army Group South, assigned to an airfield at Chuguyev in the Kharkov area where they arrived on 19 May. On 23 May, Ebener claimed his first two victories when he shot down two I-61 fighters, an early German designation for a Mikoyan-Gurevich MiG-3 fighter.

In December 1942, Ebener volunteered for the Platzschutzstaffel (airfield defence squadron) of the Pitomnik Airfield. Ebener, whose oldest brother Walter had been killed in action on the Eastern Front, was motivated to volunteer since his older brother Helmut served with a Panzer-Jäger (tank-destroyer) regiment in Stalingrad. The Staffel, largely made up from volunteers from I. and II. Gruppe of JG 3, was responsible for providing fighter escort to Junkers Ju 52 transport aircraft and Heinkel He 111 bombers shuttling supplies for the encircled German forces fighting in the Battle of Stalingrad. II. Gruppe pilots claimed 39 aerial victories between 16 and 26 December, including 13 by Ebener. In total, Ebener claimed 33 aerial victories with the Platzschutzstaffel which made him the most successful Luftwaffe fighter pilot over Stalingrad. On 17 December, Ebener claimed his 20th aerial victory when he shot down an Ilyushin Il-2 ground-attack aircraft. Two days later, the Luftwaffe managed to fly in 289 tons of supplies. That day, Ebener became an "ace-in-a-day" when he claimed four Lavochkin-Gorbunov-Gudkov LaGG-3 fighters and two Petlyakov Pe-2 bombers shot down.

On 1 March 1943, Ebener was transferred to Ergänzungs-Jagdgruppe Ost, a fighter pilot training unit for pilots destined for the Eastern Front, as an instructor. On 18 March, Ebener was awarded the German Cross in Gold (Deutsches Kreuz in Gold), and the Knight's Cross of the Iron Cross (Ritterkreuz des Eisernen Kreuzes) on 7 April for 52 aerial victories claimed. Simultaneously, he was promoted to the rank of Leutnant (second lieutenant).

=== Squadron leader ===
On 31 March 1944, he was transferred to 5. Staffel of Jagdgeschwader 11 (JG 11—11th Fighter Wing) and on 15 July, he was appointed the Staffelkapitän of 5. Staffel of JG 11. At the time II. Gruppe of JG 11 was based at Wunstorf Air Base for a period of rest and replenishment. On 12 August, the Gruppe began its relocation to the invasion front where they supported the retreat of the 5th Panzer Army and 7th Army west of Falaise. The Gruppe arrived at a makeshift airfield near Ballancourt-sur-Essonne the following day. The Gruppe had lost many aircraft during its relocation. Of the 72 Bf 109s which had left Wunstorf, only 18 were operational on 14 August. That day, the Gruppe flew its first mission in France, a training exercise to familiarize the pilots with the area of operation. During the landing approach at Ballancourt, the Gruppe came under attack by Supermarine Spitfire fighters. In this encounter, Ebener claimed a Spitfire shot down, his first claim on the Western Front. The next day, ground forces were fighting north and south of Falaise. In support, Ebener claimed a United States Army Air Forces (USAAF) Republic P-47 Thunderbolt fighter shot down.

On the evening of 16 August, II. Gruppe moved to Juvincourt Airfield and then to an airfield near Beaurieux, approximately 25 kilometers (16 miles) southeast of Laon, the next day. On 19 August, during the fighting in the Falaise pocket, Ebener claimed his last aerial victory when he shot down a P-47. He was shot down himself in a dogfight with USAAF fighters southeast of Paris while flying a Messerschmitt Bf 109 G-14 (Werknummer 780667—factory number) on 23 August 1944. Although saved by his parachute near Troyes, he was badly burned and become a prisoner of war. Initially posted as missing in action, he was replaced by Leutnant Paul Schalk as commander of 5. Staffel. Due to his serious injuries he was repatriated to Germany in January 1945.

== Later life ==
Ebener died on 7 May 1975 at the age of 55 in Fischbach, West Germany from complications of his war-time wounds.

== Summary of career ==
=== Aerial victory claims ===
According to US historian David T. Zabecki, Ebener was credited with 57 aerial victories. Obermaier and Spick also list Ebener with 57 aerial victories, 52 on the Eastern Front and five over the Western Allies, claimed in approximately 150 combat missions, and a mission-to-claim ratio of 2.63. Mathews and Foreman, authors of Luftwaffe Aces — Biographies and Victory Claims, researched the German Federal Archives and found records for 51 aerial victories, all of which claimed on the Eastern Front.

Victory claims were logged to a map-reference (PQ = Planquadrat), for example "PQ 4911". The Luftwaffe grid map (Jägermeldenetz) covered all of Europe, western Russia and North Africa and was composed of rectangles measuring 15 minutes of latitude by 30 minutes of longitude, an area of about 360 square miles (930 km^{2}). These sectors were then subdivided into 36 smaller units to give a location area 3 km × 4 km (1.9 mi × 2.5 mi) in size.

Chronicle of aerial victories
This and the ♠ (Ace of spades) indicates those aerial victories which made Ebener an "ace-in-a-day", a term which designates a fighter pilot who has shot down five or more airplanes in a single day. This and the – (dash) indicates unconfirmed aerial victory claims for which Ebener did not receive credit. This and the ? (question mark) indicates information discrepancies listed by Prien, Stemmer, Rodeike, Bock, Mathews and Foreman.
Claim	Date	Time	Type	Location	Claim	Date	Time	Type	Location
– 4. Staffel of Jagdgeschwader 3 "Udet" – Eastern Front — 26 April 1942 – 3 February 1943
1	23 May 1942	09:05? (Note: According to Mathews and Foreman claimed at 09:03.)	I-61 (MiG-3)		27♠	19 December 1942	14:09	Pe-2	PQ 4911
2	23 May 1942	14:05	I-61 (MiG-3)		28	20 December 1942	12:37? (Note: According to Mathews and Foreman claimed at 12:38.)	LaGG-3	10 km (6.2 mi) southwest of Beketovka
3	27 May 1942	15:56? (Note: According to Mathews and Foreman claimed at 15:55.)	MiG-1		— ? (Note: This unconfirmed claim is not listed by Mathews and Foreman.)	21 December 1942	—	Yak-1	
4	1 July 1942	09:08	Il-2		29	22 December 1942	13:35	Yak-1	10 km (6.2 mi) southwest of Rakutino
5	24 July 1942	18:12	Il-2		30	25 December 1942	13:05	Il-2	PQ 4921
6	25 July 1942	12:32	R-5		31	25 December 1942	13:06	LaGG-3	PQ 4921
7	26 July 1942	03:56	LaGG-3		32	28 December 1942	09:05	LaGG-3	PQ 4937
8	27 July 1942	07:15	MiG-1	PQ 3942, south of Dubinskij	33	30 December 1942	09:45? (Note: According to Mathews and Foreman claimed at 09:47.)	MiG-1	5 km (3.1 mi) north of Gorodishche
9	30 July 1942	13:04? (Note: According to Mathews and Foreman claimed at 13:03.)	Yak-1	PQ 39181; 10 km (6.2 mi) west of Kalach	34	30 December 1942	09:48	MiG-1	5 km (3.1 mi) north of Stalingrad
10	30 July 1942	13:05	Yak-1	PQ 39191; 10 km (6.2 mi) west of Kalach	35	30 December 1942	12:25	Il-2	PQ 49114; 25 km (16 mi) northwest of Gumrak
11	1 August 1942	15:37	LaGG-3	PQ 3941, west of Kalach; 10 km (6.2 mi) southeast of Kalach	36	30 December 1942	12:27	LaGG-3	PQ 49412
12	5 August 1942	04:40	Pe-2	PQ 49354, Beketovka; 20 km (12 mi) south of Bassargino	37	4 January 1943	15:57? (Note: According to Mathews and Foreman claimed at 13:57.)	LaGG-3	PQ 3941
13? (Note: This claim is not listed by Mathews and Foreman.)	5 August 1942	04:42	Pe-2	12 km (7.5 mi) west of Beketovka	38	7 January 1943	07:47	LaGG-3	PQ 4915
14	21 August 1942	13:37	I-180 (Yak-7)	PQ 39492; 40 km (25 mi) south of Pitomnik	39	7 January 1943	08:26	La-5	PQ 4937
15	15 September 1942	14:47	Pe-2	PQ 57711	40	10 January 1943	07:30? (Note: According to Mathews and Foreman claimed at 07:26.)	Il-2	7 km (4.3 mi) north of Pitomnik Airfield vicinity of Bassargino
16	6 October 1942	07:20	LaGG-3	3 km (1.9 mi) west of Neprije	41	10 January 1943	07:35	Il-2	PQ 49132
17	15 October 1942	09:01	LaGG-3	PQ 38613	42	10 January 1943	07:46	LaGG-3	PQ 49316; 10 km (6.2 mi) southwest of Bassargino
18	3 December 1942	12:40	Il-2	PQ 26192	43	10 January 1943	09:03	Il-2	6 km (3.7 mi) north of Babukin; 10 km (6.2 mi) northeast of Pitomnik
19	3 December 1942	12:42	Il-2	PQ 26161	44	12 January 1943	10:40	Il-2	PQ 49143; 10 km (6.2 mi) northeast of Pitomnik
20	17 December 1942	13:24	Il-2	PQ 49121; 10 km (6.2 mi) north of Gumrak	45	12 January 1943	10:42	Il-2	PQ 49143; 10 km (6.2 mi) northeast of Pitomnik
21	17 December 1942	13:26	Yak-1	PQ 4078	46	12 January 1943	14:25	LaGG-3	PQ 49312; 10 km (6.2 mi) southwest of Bassargino
22	18 December 1942	12:47	Il-2	PQ 3945	47	13 January 1943	10:15	Il-2	PQ 4934
23♠	19 December 1942	12:45	LaGG-3	PQ 3946	48	15 January 1943	08:28	DB-3	PQ 4912
24♠	19 December 1942	13:52	LaGG-3	PQ 3942	49	15 January 1943	08:32	DB-3	PQ 4911
25♠	19 December 1942	13:55	LaGG-3	PQ 3942	50	15 January 1943	10:21	LaGG-3	PQ 4934
26♠	19 December 1942	14:08	Pe-2	PQ 4911	51	15 January 1943	10:39	LaGG-3	PQ 4918
– 5. Staffel of Jagdgeschwader 11 – nvasion of Normandy — August 1944
52?	14 August 1944	—	Spitfire		55?	18 August 1944	—	P-51	
53?	15 August 1944	—	P-47		56?	19 August 1944	—	P-47	
54?	16 August 1944	—	P-47						

=== Awards ===
- Iron Cross (1939) 2nd and 1st Class
- Honor Goblet of the Luftwaffe on 15 March 1943 as Feldwebel and pilot
- German Cross in Gold on 18 March 1943 as Feldwebel in the 4./Jagdgeschwader 3
- Knight's Cross of the Iron Cross on 7 April 1943 as Feldwebel and pilot in the 4./Jagdgeschwader 3 "Udet"
