= 321st Division =

321st Division may refer to:

- 321st Infantry Division (Wehrmacht), Germany
- 321st Division (Imperial Japanese Army)
- 321st Rifle Division, Soviet Union

== See also ==
- List of military divisions by number
