= Otto Korfes =

German politician and archivist (1889–1964)

Chairman of the Association of Former Officers
- In office 1958–1964
- Preceded by: position established
- Succeeded by: Arno von Lenski

Personal details
- Born: 23 November 1889 Wenzen, German Empire
- Died: 24 August 1964 (aged 74) Potsdam, German Democratic Republic
- Resting place: Neuer Friedhof, Potsdam
- Party: National Democratic Party of Germany (1948–)
- Spouse: Gudrun Mertz von Quirnheim
- Children: Sigrid Wegner-Korfes
- Relatives: Albrecht Mertz von Quirnheim (brother-in-law); Wilhelm Dieckmann (brother-in-law)
- Education: Friedrich Wilhelm University
- Awards: Medal for Fighters Against Fascism (1964); Patriotic Order of Merit, in silver (1959); Ernst Moritz Arndt Medal (1957)
- Military Service
- Allegiance: (East Germany) German Democratic Republic; Nazi Germany; Weimar Republic; German Empire
- Branch: Kasernierte Volkspolizei; Wehrmacht; Reichswehr; Imperial German Army
- Rank: Major General
- Units: LI Army Corps; 295th Infantry Division; 518th Regiment; IV Corps; 7th Division; 3rd Magdeburg Infantry Regiment
- Commands: 295th Infantry Division
- Conflicts: Second World War; Battle of Stalingrad (POW); First World War; Battle of Liège
- Awards: Knight's Cross of the Iron Cross (1943); German Cross, in gold (1942); Iron Cross, 1st and 2nd Class (1916)

Otto Korfes (23 November 1889 – 24 August 1964) was a German military officer and historian. He participated in the Battle of Stalingrad as a divisional commander. Later he joined the National Committee for a Free Germany, and held a number of military and political roles in the German Democratic Republic.

== Biography ==
Korfes was born on 23 November 1889 in Wenzen, the son of a pastor. He attended secondary school in Blankenburg.

On 17 March 1909 Korfes enlisted in the Imperial German Army as an Fahnenjunker (officer cadet), joining the 3rd Magdeburg Infantry Regiment No. 66 of the 7th Division. He was promoted to Fähnrich on 18 October 1909, and to lieutenant on 22 August 1910. With the outbreak of the First World War, Korfes was assigned to command a platoon on the Western Front. He took part in the Battle of Liège, one of the first battles of the war. On 25 February 1915 he was promoted to Oberleutnant, receiving command of a battalion. His last promotion before the conclusion of the war occurred on 18 December 1917, to the rank of captain. After the end of the war, Korfes was retained in the Reichswehr of the Weimar Republic, reaching the rank of major on 30 September 1920.

Korfes then studied at the Friedrich Wilhelm University of Berlin. In 1923, he received as a doctorate in political science under the tutelage of Max Sering and Werner Sombart. From April 1920 to June 1937 he was employed at the Reichsarchiv in Potsdam, performing military research. In 1929, he married Gudrun Mertz von Quirnheim (1907–1979), who descended from a minor noble family. In 1933, his first daughter, Sigrid Wegner-Korfes was born.

Korfes returned to active service from the reserves in October 1937. On 1 February 1938 he was promoted to Oberstleutnant (lieutenant colonel). On 5 February 1940 Korfes took command of the 518 Regiment of the 295th Infantry Division. He was promoted to Oberst (colonel) on 1 January 1941. Korfes' regiment and division were part of the spearhead of Operation Barbarossa. On 2 November 1942 Korfes relinquished command and was placed in the Führerreserve. On 16 November 1942 Korfes was reactivated and placed in command of the 295th Infantry Division, succeeding Rolf Wuthmann. By this time, the 295th was deeply involved in the Battle of Stalingrad. The division was destroyed in the battle, and Korfes was taken prisoner by the Red Army on 31 January 1943.

Following his capture, Korfes was detained at the Voikovo prison camp. He joined the anti-Nazi National Committee for a Free Germany (NKFD) and took part in radio broadcasts calling for German soldiers to surrender. As a result of his cooperation with the Soviet Union, members of Korfes' family were taken to various prisons and concentration camps under the principle of Sippenhaft. Korfes was also involved in the formation of the League of German Officers, an organization bringing together anti-Nazi military officers.

His brother-in-law, Albrecht Mertz von Quirnheim, was part of the 20 July plot to assassinate Adolf Hitler led by Claus von Stauffenberg. His other brother-in-law, Wilhelm Dieckmann, was also part of the military resistance against Nazism.

After the conclusion of the Second World War, Korfes was placed in charge of archives at the Ministry of the Interior of the German Democratic Republic. He joined the National Democratic Party and was a founding member of the National Council of the National Front. From 1952 to 1956, he returned to military service as a major general in the Kasernierte Volkspolizei (trans. Barracked People's Police). From 1958 until his death, Korfes was chairman of the Association of Former Officers (Arbeitsgemeinschaft ehemaliger Offiziere). He was succeeded as chairman by Arno von Lenski. On 24 August 1964 Korfes died of a heart attack; he was buried at the Neuer Friedhof in Potsdam.

== Awards ==
- Medal for Fighters Against Fascism (1964)
- Patriotic Order of Merit, in silver (1959)
- Ernst Moritz Arndt Medal (1957)
- Knight's Cross of the Iron Cross (1943)
- German Cross, in gold (1942)
- Iron Cross, 1st and 2nd Class (1916)
