= Wilhelm Thomas =

- Born: 8 October 1892
- Died: 24 August 1976 (aged 83)
- Military career
- Allegiance: Nazi Germany
- Branch: Army (Wehrmacht)
- Service years: 1912–1945
- Rank: Generalleutnant
- Commands: 321st Infantry Division; 203rd Infantry Division; 286th Infantry Division
- Conflicts: World War II
- Awards: Knight's Cross of the Iron Cross

Wilhelm Thomas (8 October 1892 – 24 August 1976) was a general in the Wehrmacht of Nazi Germany during World War II who commanded several divisions. He was a recipient of the Knight's Cross of the Iron Cross.

== Awards and decorations ==
- Knight's Cross of the Iron Cross on 13 October 1941 as Oberst and commander of Infanterie-Regiment 71
