= Albrecht Mertz von Quirnheim =

German resistance member

Albrecht Mertz Ritter von Quirnheim
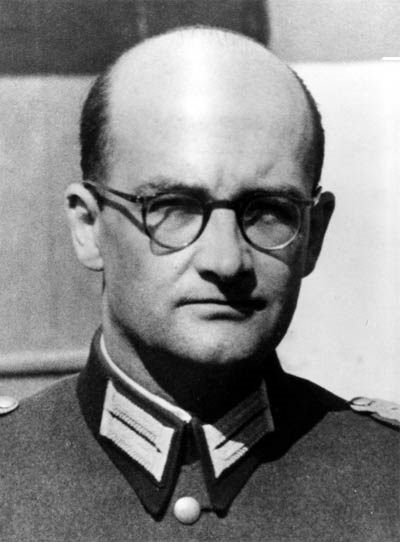
- Born: 25 March 1905; Munich, Kingdom of Bavaria, German Empire
- Died: 21 July 1944 (aged 39); Berlin, Gau Berlin, Nazi Germany; 52.507892°N 13.36219°E
- Cause of death: Execution by firing squad
- Relatives: Walter Hohmann (uncle); Otto Korfes (brother-in-law)
- Military career
- Allegiance: Weimar Republic; Nazi Germany
- Branch: German Army
- Service years: 1923–1944
- Rank: Oberst
- Conflicts: World War II

Albrecht Mertz von Quirnheim (25 March 1905 – 21 July 1944) was a German Army colonel and a resistance fighter in Nazi Germany involved in the 20 July plot against Adolf Hitler.

== Early life ==
Quirnheim was born in Munich, the son of Hermann Mertz von Quirnheim, a captain on the Bavarian General Staff, and the nephew of Walter Hohmann. He spent his youth in the Bavarian capital before his father became head of the Imperial Archive (the Reichsarchiv) and the family moved to Potsdam in Prussia. As a child he befriended Hans-Jürgen von Blumenthal and as a young man came to know the brothers Werner von Haeften and Hans Bernd von Haeften, through family connections; these were all future fellow-conspirators.

== Military career ==
Following his Abitur, Quirnheim joined the Reichswehr in 1923. His friendship with Claus von Stauffenberg, who would become the key conspirator in the 20 July plot, began in 1925, but it was Blumenthal who introduced him to the circle of conspirators in 1943.

=== Second World War ===
On the outbreak of the Second World War, Quirnheim was appointed a Staff Officer at the General Staff's organisational division. He had initially welcomed Hitler's seizure of power, but began to distance himself from the new government as he became more aware of its brutality. In 1941, for example, his support for the more humane treatment of civilians in Nazi-occupied Eastern Europe triggered a dispute between Alfred Rosenberg, the Reich Minister for the Occupied Eastern Territories, and Erich Koch, Reich Commissar for Ukraine.

In 1942, while being promoted to lieutenant colonel and then to Head of Staff of the 24th Army Corps at the Eastern Front, Quirnheim strengthened his ties to the Resistance through his brother-in-law Wilhelm Dieckmann. He was promoted to colonel in 1943, and the same year he married Hilde Baier.

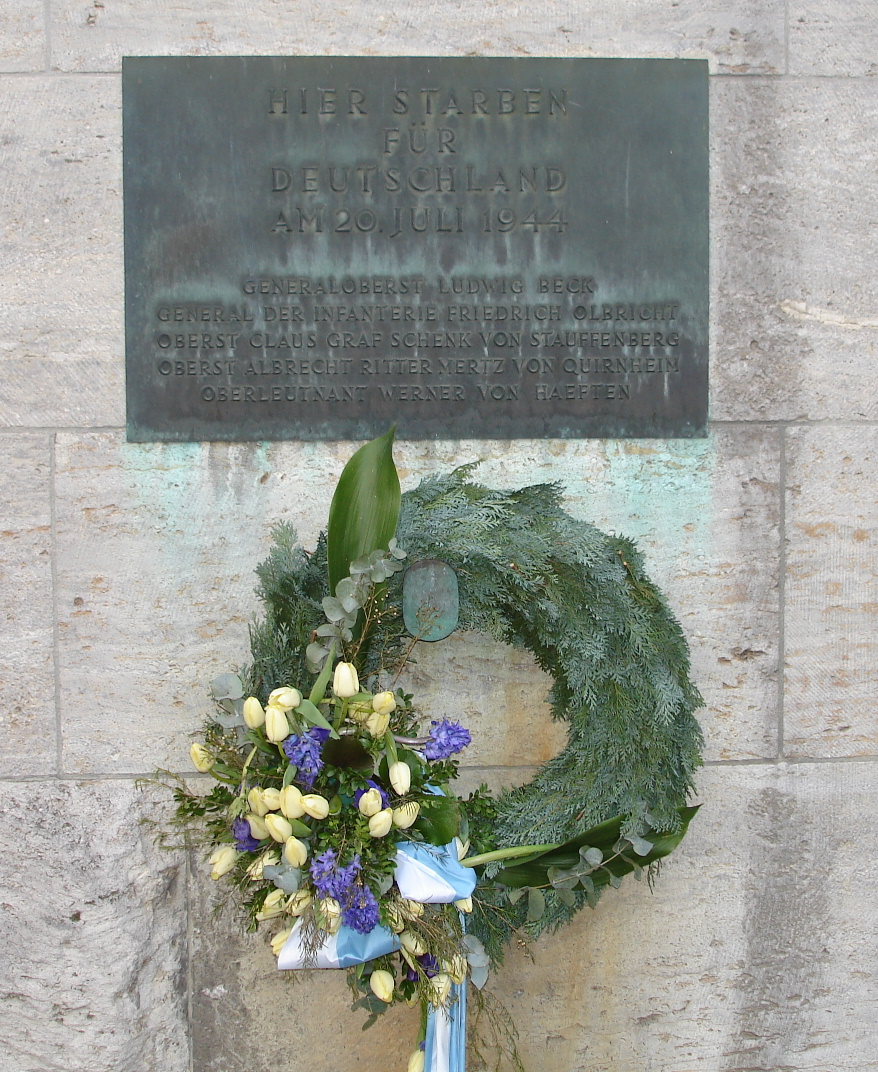
Memorial at Bendlerblock

=== 20 July plot ===
By September 1943, Quirnheim had become involved in the plot to assassinate Hitler. He, his superior General Friedrich Olbricht and Stauffenberg planned Operation Valkyrie, a plan of action to be implemented as soon as Hitler had been killed. Meanwhile, Quirnheim succeeded Stauffenberg as Chief of Staff at the Army's General Office in Berlin. Immediately after the attempt on Hitler's life in East Prussia on 20 July 1944, Quirnheim urged General Olbricht to activate Operation Valkyrie, even though they could not be sure whether Hitler was dead. At about the same time, however, news began to arrive that Hitler had survived the assassination attempt. Nevertheless, Olbricht eventually activated the plan and Stauffenberg joined them in Berlin. Ultimately, largely because news of Hitler's survival became common knowledge, the plot collapsed.

Within hours, Quirnheim, Stauffenberg, Olbricht, and Werner von Haeften had been arrested, summarily tried by Colonel-General Friedrich Fromm—a quiet supporter who betrayed them once he saw the plot had failed—and taken into the courtyard of the Bendlerblock, where they were shot by a firing squad. Quirnheim was the second of the four to be shot, after Olbricht. The bodies were buried in the Matthäus Churchyard in Berlin's Schöneberg district; a stone in memory of the event stands in the churchyard. Heinrich Himmler subsequently ordered the bodies to be exhumed and cremated, and the ashes scattered.

A few days later, Quirnheim's parents and one of his sisters were arrested by the Gestapo and his brother-in-law Wilhelm Dieckmann was executed on 13 September 1944.

There is a now a memorial on the wall of the Bendlerblock, where Quirnheim and his fellow conspirators were shot.

== See also ==
- List of members of the 20 July plot
- German resistance to Nazism
