= 295th Infantry Division (Wehrmacht) =

- 295. Infanterie-Division
- Active: February 1940 - May 1945
- Country: Nazi Germany
- Branch: Army
- Type: Infantry
- Size: Division
- Engagements: World War II: Battle of France; Operation Barbarossa; Battle of Uman; Battle of Stalingrad

The 295th Infantry Division (German: 295. Infanterie-Division) was an infantry division of the German Heer during World War II.

== Operational history ==
=== Formation ===
The division was formed on 10 February 1940 as part of the eighth Aufstellungswelle in the Magdeburg are within Wehrkreis XI. It initially consisted of Infantry Regiments 516, 517 and 518, as well as Artillery Regiment 295.

- Infantry Regiment 516 was formed from the staff of Infantry Regiment 118 and parts of Infantry Regiment 87, both formerly part of the 36th Infantry Division, and Infantry Regiment 193, formerly part of the 69th Infantry Division.
- Infantry Regiment 517 was created from parts of Infantry Regiment 74, formerly part of 19th Infantry Division, and Infantry Regiment 12, formerly part of 31st Infantry Division.
- Infantry Regiment 518 was assembled from parts of Infantry Regiment 211, formerly part of 71st Infantry Division, and Infantry Regiment 487, formerly part of 267th Infantry Division.

=== Battle of France and occupation duty in France ===
In May 1940, the 295th Infantry Division was in the OKH reserves and was sent to Belgium in June, during the Battle of France. The division was subsequently on occupation duty in the Lille area, before being transferred to Rouen, where it remained until April 1941. On 15 November 1940, the division transferred a third of its personnel to the 321st Infantry Division, part of the thirteenth Aufstellungswelle.

=== Service on the Eastern Front ===
In June 1941, the 295th Division was in the spearhead of Operation Barbarossa, the German invasion of the Soviet Union. It fought as part of 17th Army (Carl-Heinrich von Stülpnagel) in the Vinnytsia area and participated in the Battle of Uman. It crossed the Dnieper and took part in the German advance through Ukraine before facing a setback during the Soviet winter offensive of 1941. The 295th Division also the Mobile Group of the First Slovak Republic, Slovakia's most significant contribution to Operation Barbarossa.

Members of the 295th Infantry Division participated in the Zolochiv pogrom that took place between 2 July and 4 July 1941. The division's officers were either unable or unwilling to stop the 5th SS Panzer Division Wiking's excess of violence against local civilians.

In August 1941, members of the 295th Infantry Division either actively participated or at least in the majority passively stood by during a massacre of civilians in Bila Tserkva, a Ukrainian settlement close to Kiev. The divisional first staff officer, Helmuth Groscurth, was unable to prevent the village's young children from falling victim to the SS. At least 90 were shot by SS units.

The division was destroyed during the Battle of Stalingrad in January 1943.

=== Redeployment and occupation duty in Norway ===
On 12 February 1943, an order was given to deploy the division, initially at Kampfgruppe strength, later upgraded to a static division that was deployed in occupied Norway. The static division was ordered to be upgraded to full division strength on 24 January 1945. After the end of World War II, the division was imprisoned by British forces.

== Noteworthy individuals ==
- Herbert Geitner, divisional commander starting 6 February 1940.
- Karl Gümbel, divisional commander starting 8 December 1941.
- Ulrich Schütze, divisional commander starting 2 April 1942.
- Rolf Wuthmann, divisional commander starting 2 May 1942.
- Otto Korfes, divisional commander starting 16 November 1942.
- Georg Dinter, divisional commander starting 1 April 1943.
- Karl-Ludwig Rhein, divisional commander starting 27 July 1944.
- Siegfried Macholz, divisional commander starting 26 January 1945.
- Helmuth Groscurth, divisional chief of staff and member of the German resistance.
