= Edwin Graf von Rothkirch und Trach =

German army general (1888-1980)

Edwin von Rothkirch und Trach
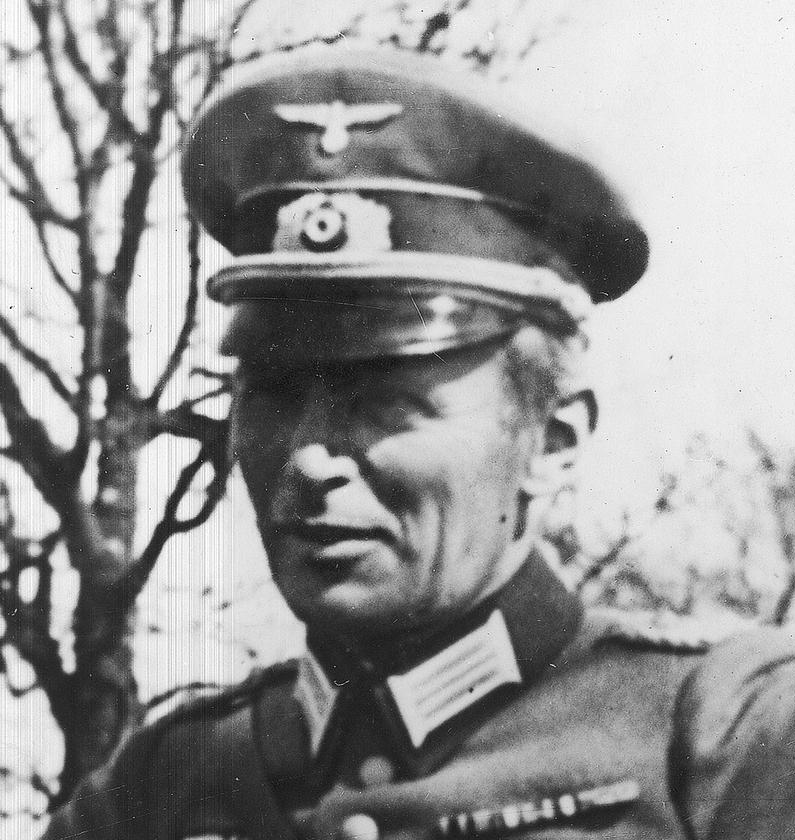
- Rothkirch und Trach in March 1938
- Born: 1 November 1888; Militsch, German Empire
- Died: 29 July 1980 (aged 91); Rettershof, Hesse, West Germany
- Military career
- Allegiance: German Empire; Weimar Republic; Nazi Germany
- Branch: Imperial German Army; Reichswehr; German Army
- Service years: 1908–1945
- Rank: General of the Cavalry
- Commands: 330th Infantry Division; Army Group Centre Rear Area; LIII Army Corps
- Conflicts: World War I World War II
- Awards: German Cross in gold Clasp to the Iron Cross 2nd and 1st class

Edwin Graf Rothkirch und Trach (1 November 1888 – 29 July 1980) was a German career military officer who fought in both world wars. He served in the Imperial German Army, the Reichswehr and the Wehrmacht. Rising to the rank of General of the Cavalry during World War II, he commanded Army Group Centre Rear Area and LIII Army Corps. He was taken prisoner in the closing months of the war.

== Early life and World War I ==
Rothkirch und Trach was born in 1888 at Militsch in the Prussian Province of Silesia (today, Milicz in Poland) to an aristocratic family, and joined the Royal Prussian Army in 1908. He participated in World War I and, at the end of the war, he was a Rittmeister with the 17th (1st Grand Ducal Mecklenburgian) Dragoon Regiment. He was awarded both classes of the Iron Cross and other decorations.

== Interwar years ==
Rothkirch und Trach remained in the post-war Reichswehr, becoming a squadron commander in the 16th Cavalry Regiment at Kassel in October 1924. In October 1928, he was transferred to the staff of the 11th Cavalry Regiment in Neustadt in Upper Silesia (today, Prudnik in Poland). In January 1930, he moved to the staff of the 14th Cavalry Regiment in Ludwigslust. In May 1934, he was promoted to Oberstleutnant and was appointed commander of the 15th Cavalry Regiment in Paderborn in October 1934. In March 1938, he became commander of the 2nd Rifle Brigade in Meiningen and participated in the occupation of Austria after the Anschluss. In November, he was named commander of border fortifications near Breslau (today, Wrocław).

== World War II ==
After the outbreak of World War II, Rothkirch und Trach was named the chief of staff in XXXIV Army Corps where he served until April 1940, following his promotion to Generalmajor on 1 March 1940. He then became a divisional commander of occupation troops in the General Government. In January 1942, he took command of the 330th Infantry Division with which he was sent to fight against the Red Army on the eastern front. On 1 March 1942, he was promoted to Generalleutnant.

Rothkirch und Trach commanded Army Group Centre Rear Area starting in October 1943. On 1 January 1944, he was promoted to General of the Cavalry. Between 18 April and 27 October 1944, he was Wehrmachtbefehlshaber Weißruthenien (Military commander in Belarus). In November 1944, he was appointed to command the newly-established LIII Army Corps, which was sent to the western front. On 6 March 1945, Rothkirch wandered into U.S. lines and was taken as a prisoner of war west of Koblenz. He was interned at Trent Park, an English prison camp in North London for high-ranking German officers.

== Knowledge of the Holocaust ==
While stationed in General Government, Rothkirch und Trach became aware of mass shootings by the Schutzstaffel (SS). In its review of Soldaten ("Soldiers") by historian Sönke Neitzel and social psychologist Harald Welzer (a book based on secret recordings of German POWs by the Allied intelligence), Der Spiegel reports:

"Many Wehrmacht soldiers became witnesses to the Holocaust because they happened to be present or were invited to take part in a mass shooting. In one cell conversation, army General Edwin Graf von Rothkirch und Trach talks about his time in the General Government town of Kutno:

"I knew an SS leader pretty well, and we talked about this and that, and one day he said: 'Listen, if you ever want to film one of these shootings? …I mean, it doesn't really matter. These people are always shot in the morning. If you're interested, we still have a few left over, and we could also shoot them in the afternoon if you like."

It takes some sense of routine to be able to make such an offer. The fact that the people involved did not try to keep their activities a secret demonstrates how much the perpetrators took for granted the "mass shootings of Jews," as one of the POWs in Trent Park called it."

Rothkirch und Trach died in 1980.

== Awards and decorations ==
- Iron Cross 2nd and 1st class
- Hanseatic Cross of Hamburg
- Military Merit Cross of Mecklenburg-Schwerin 1st class
- Princely Reuss Honour Cross 3rd class
- Honour Cross of the World War 1914/1918
- German Cross in gold
- Clasp to the Iron Cross 2nd and 1st class

== Sources ==
- Graf von Rothkirch und Trach, Ernst Georg Edwin in Lexikon der Wehrmacht.
- Pohl, Dieter (2008). Die Herrschaft der Wehrmacht: Deutsche Militärbesatzung und einheimische Bevölkerung in der Sowjetunion 1941–1944. Oldenbourg Wissenschaftsverlag. ISBN 978-3486580655.
- Webb, James Jack (2025). Generals and Admirals of the Third Reich: For Country or Fuehrer. Vol. 3: P–Z. Havertown, PA: Casemate Publishers. ISBN 978-1-952-71518-1.

Military offices
Preceded by General der Gebirgstruppe Ludwig Kübler	Commander of Army Group Centre Rear Area; 1 October 1943 – 1 July 1944	Succeeded by None
Preceded by General der Infanterie Friedrich Gollwitzer	Commander of LIII. Armeekorps; 11 November 1944 – 6 March 1945	Succeeded by Generalleutnant Walter Botsch
