= 203rd Security Division =

- 203. Sicherungs-Division
- Active: 1941–1944
- Country: Nazi Germany
- Branch: Army (Wehrmacht)
- Type: Security division
- Size: Division
- Engagements: World War II

The 203rd Security Division, was a rear-security division in the Wehrmacht of Nazi Germany. The unit was deployed in German-occupied areas of the Soviet Union, in the Army Group Centre Rear Area and was responsible for large-scale war crimes and atrocities.

== Operational history ==
The division was formed in June 1942 on the basis of the 203rd Security Brigade that was itself formed in December 1941. It operated in the Army Group Centre Rear Area, of the occupied regions of the Soviet Union behind Army Group Centre's front lines. Its duties included security of communications and supply lines, economic exploitation and combatting irregular fighters (partisans) in Wehrmacht's rear areas.

The so-called anti-partisan operations in "bandit-infested" areas amounted to destruction of villages, plunder and enslavement of civilian population. In July 1942, the division took part in '"Operation Peter". The unit received specific instructions regarding the villages deemed "bandit-friendly" (those failing to meet agricultural quotas). The division was to appropriate livestock, deport the population for slave labour to Germany and burn the villages down.

The unit suffered heavy losses during the Soviet Red Army summer offensive Operation Bagration in 1944. In October 1944 it was designated the 203rd Infantry Division, and continued to fight on the Eastern Front until Germany's surrender.

== Commanders ==
- Generalleutnant Rudolf Pilz (January 1943 – 19 August 1944)
- Generalleutnant Max Horn (19 August 1944 – 18 November 1944)
- Generalleutnant Wilhelm Thomas (18 November 1944 – 26 December 1944)
- Generalmajor Fritz Gädicke (26 December 1944 – April 1945)

== See also ==
- War crimes of the Wehrmacht
