= 321st Infantry Division (Wehrmacht) =

- German: 321. Infanterie-Division
- Country: Nazi Germany
- Branch: Infantry
- Size: Division
- Engagements: World War II

Commanders
- Commander: Ludwig Löweneck; Wilhelm Thomas; Ulrich Liss; Karl Sievers; Georg Zwade

The 321st Infantry Division (German: 321. Infanterie-Division) was an infantry division of the German Heer during World War II. Between November 1943 and June 1944, it was known as Division Group 321 (German: Divisionsgruppe 321).

== History ==
=== 321st Infantry Division ===
The 321st Infantry Division was formed as a static division of the 13th Aufstellungswelle in the Braunschweig area in Wehrkreis XI. Its initial recruits were drawn, among others, from parts of the 267th and 295th Infantry Divisions, of the fourth and eighth Aufstellungswelle respectively. The division's initial commander was Ludwig Löweneck.

After the division's deployment was completed in April 1941, the 321st Infantry Division was sent to occupation duty in France. It served in the Boulogne-sur-Mer area from May 1941 until December 1942. It served initially under the XXXVII Army Corps (renamed LXXXII Army Corps later in the war), but was moved to the LXXXI Army Corps in June 1942.

On 23 July 1942, the previously incomplete infantry regiments and artillery regiments were brought to full strength. Following a decree on 21 October 1942, the division was restructured from a static division to an assault division and prepared for deployment on the Eastern Front. Starting in January 1943, the 321st Infantry Division, commanded by Wilhelm Thomas since 16 November 1942, was deployed in the central sector of the Eastern Front.

The division was heavily battered over the course of the year 1943. The 321st Infantry Division, commanded by Ulrich Liss starting on 28 July, by Karl Sievers starting on 22 August, and by Georg Zwade starting on 23 September, effectively stopped existing as a self-reliant fighting force by October 1943. As an emergency solution, the eviscerated division was first attached as a supporting force to the 110th and 211th Infantry Divisions, and subsequently permanently dissolved as an independent division on 2 November 1943.

Between January and August 1943, the division had served under the LVI Panzer Corps, but was moved to the LV Army Corps in September.

=== Successive formations ===
==== Division Group 321 ====
After the dissolution of the 321st Infantry Division, its remnants on the Eastern Front were grouped into Division Group 321, which was subsequently assigned to the 110th Infantry Division, a formation that the previous 321st Infantry Division had already fought alongside earlier in the year 1943.

Division Group 321, which was formally assembled on 2 November 1943 (the day of the dissolution of the 321st Infantry Division), was destroyed in June 1944 while under command of Army Group Center, which was at that time suffering a decisive strategic defeat at Soviet hands (Operation Bagration).

==== Battle Group Normandy (later: 352nd Infantry Division) ====
Instead of serving with Division Group 321, some veterans of the dissolved 321st Infantry Division were also transferred to the Saint-Lô sector in occupied France to assist in the formation of the 352nd Infantry Division, a division that would subsequently become famous as the force that defended Omaha Beach on 6 June 1944. On 12 October 1943, Kampfgruppe Normandie ('Battle Group Normandy') was formed from veterans of the 321st Infantry Division in preparation to the formation of the 352nd Infantry Division. The formation of the 352nd Infantry Division was ordered on 5 November 1943, and the newly formed division arrived in the Saint-Lô area in December.

== Organization ==
=== Superior formations ===
Superior formations of the 321st Infantry Division of the German Wehrmacht, 1940–1943
Year	Month	Army Corps	Army	Army Group	Area
1940	December	Still in deployment.			Wehrkreis XI
1941	January – April	Still in deployment.			Wehrkreis XI
1941	May – December	XXXVII Army Corps	15th Army	Army Group D	Boulogne-sur-Mer
1942	January – May	XXXVII Army Corps	15th Army	Army Group D	Boulogne-sur-Mer
1942	June – November	LXXXI Army Corps	15th Army	Army Group D	Boulogne-sur-Mer
1942	December	Army Group reserves.		Army Group D	Boulogne-sur-Mer
1943	January – August	LVI Panzer Corps	4th Army	Army Group Center	Zhizdra
1943	September – October	LV Army Corps	9th Army	Army Group Center	Bryansk

When the 321st Infantry Division was dissolved, its remnants became Division Group 321 and put under control of the 110th Infantry Division.

=== Subordinate formations ===
After deployment, the 321st Infantry Division consisted of the following parts:

- Infantry Regiment 588 (three battalions). (Note: Formed from the third battalions of Infantry Regiment 467 and Infantry Regiment 497, previously known as the Erg. Btl. II./12 and the Erg. Btl. II./82 respectively. Both of the regiments were previously part of the 267th Infantry Division.)
- Infantry Regiment 589 (three battalions). (Note: Formed from the third battalions of Infantry Regiment 517 and Infantry Regiment 518. Both of those regiments were previously part of the 295th Infantry Division.)
- Infantry Regiment 590 (three battalions). (Note: Formed from the third battalion of Infantry Regiment 487, previously part of the 267th Infantry Division, and the third battalion of Infantry Regiment 516, previously part of the 295th Infantry Division.)
- Artillery Regiment 321 (three detachments). (Note: Formed from the third detachments of Artillery Regiment 267 and Artillery Regiment 295 (with each regiment carrying the ordinal number of its previous parent infantry division), as well as four additional batteries.)
- Division Units 321.

== Noteworthy individuals ==
- Ludwig Löweneck, divisional commander of the 321st Infantry Division (15 December 1940 – 16 November 1942).
- Wilhelm Thomas, divisional commander of the 321st Infantry Division (16 November 1942 – 28 July 1943).
- Ulrich Liss, divisional commander of the 321st Infantry Division (28 July 1943 – 22 August 1943).
- Karl Sievers, divisional commander of the 321st Infantry Division (22 August 1943 – 23 September 1943).
- Georg Zwade, divisional commander of the 321st Infantry Division (23 September 1943 – 2 November 1943).
