= Georg Zwade =

Nazi officer (1893–1968)

- Born: 5 October 1893; Berlin
- Died: 1968 (aged 74–75); Rheda, Germany (Westphalen)
- Military career
- Allegiance: German Empire; Weimar Republic; Nazi Germany
- Branch: Army
- Service years: 1913–1945
- Rank: Generalmajor
- Commands: 208th Infantry Division; 330th Infantry Division; 321st Infantry Division; 367th Infantry Division; LXXII Army Corps; 155th Infantry Division
- Conflicts: World War II
- Awards: German Cross in Gold

Georg Zwade (5 October 1893 – 1968) was an officer in the Wehrmacht of Nazi Germany during World War II who commanded several divisions.

Zwade fought in the Balkans campaign, on the Eastern Front, in Romania and finally in Italy where he surrendered to the Allies at Belluno.
He was a recipient of the German Cross in Gold.

== Sources ==
- Lexikon der Wehrmacht
