= Fischbach (Taunus) =

- Stadtteil of Kelkheim
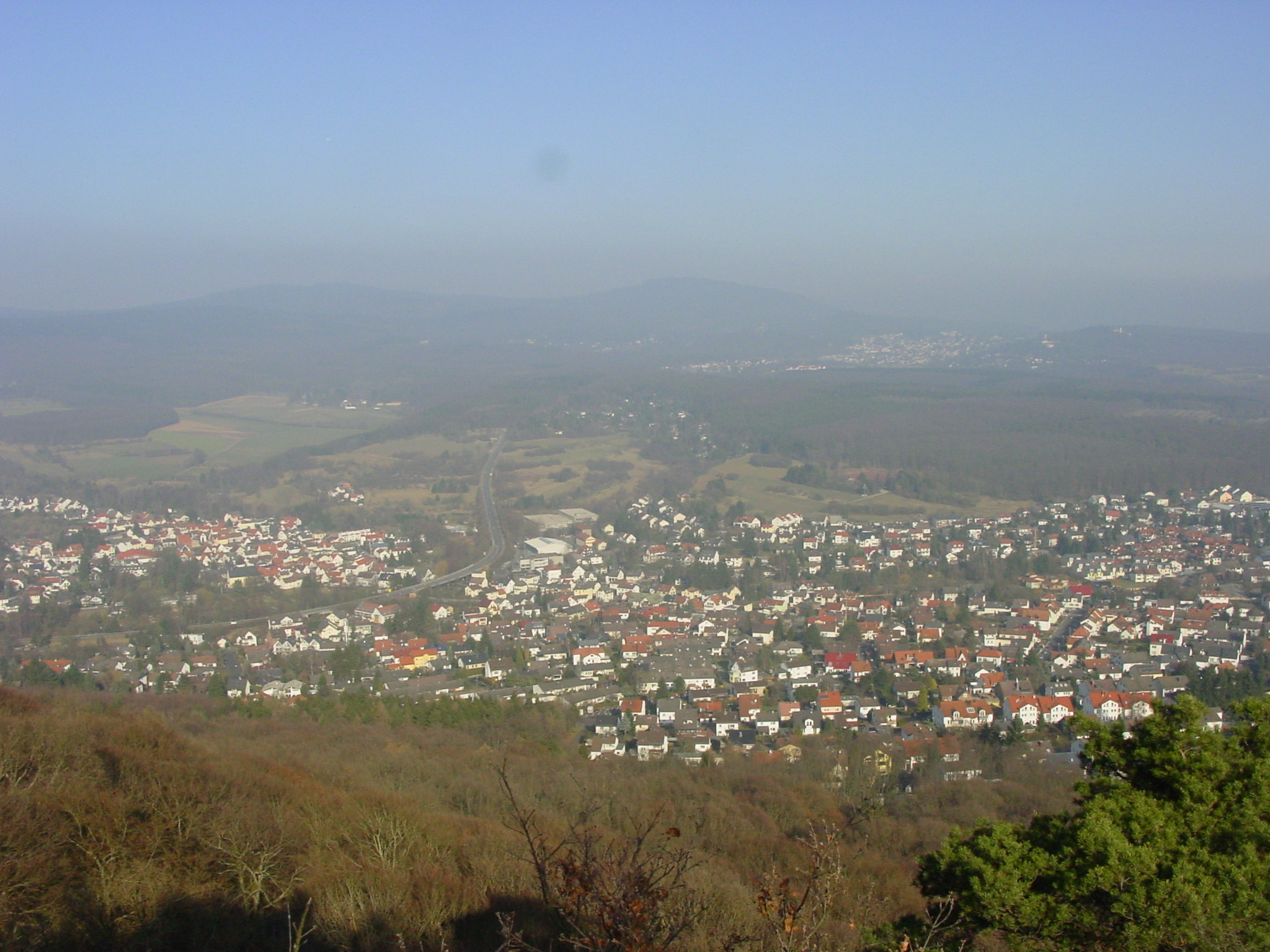

- Coat of arms
- Interactive map of Fischbach (Taunus)
- Location within Germany Location within Hesse
- Coordinates: 50°09′07″N 08°25′19″E
- Country: Germany
- State: Hesse
- Admin. region: Darmstadt
- District: Urban district
- Town: Kelkheim

Area
  - Total: 6.81 km^{2} (2.63 sq mi)
- Elevation: 222 m (728 ft)

Population
  - Total: 6,000
  - Density: 880/km^{2} (2,300/sq mi)
- Time zone: UTC+01:00 (CET)
  - Summer (DST): UTC+02:00 (CEST)
- Postal codes: 65779
- Dialling codes: 06195
- Vehicle registration: MTK

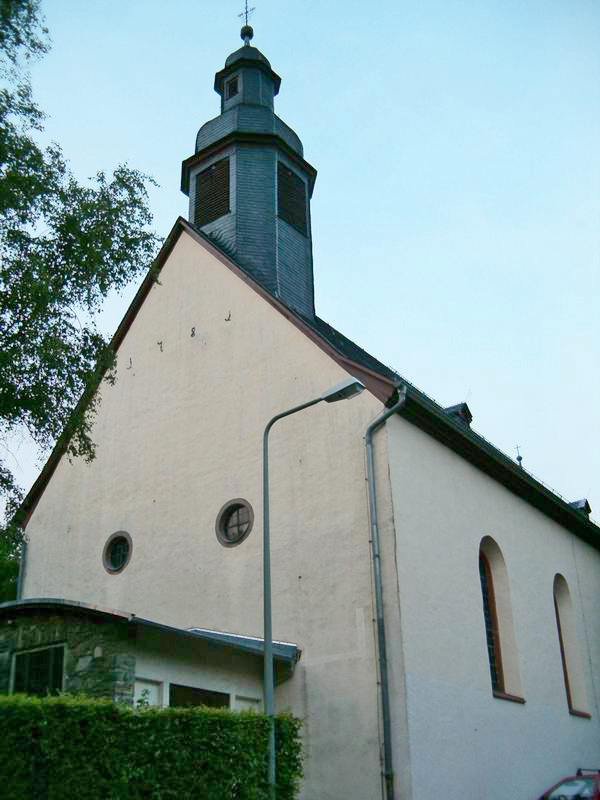
Trinity Church, 1781

Fischbach (German pronunciation: [ˈfɪʃˌbax], lit. 'fish brook') is a Stadtteil, one of six administrative subdivisions, of the town of Kelkheim in the Main-Taunus district of Germany. It is situated at the western border of Frankfurt am Main in the Taunus hills. Fischbach is a middle-class town and has about 5,900 inhabitants.

== Geography ==
=== Location ===
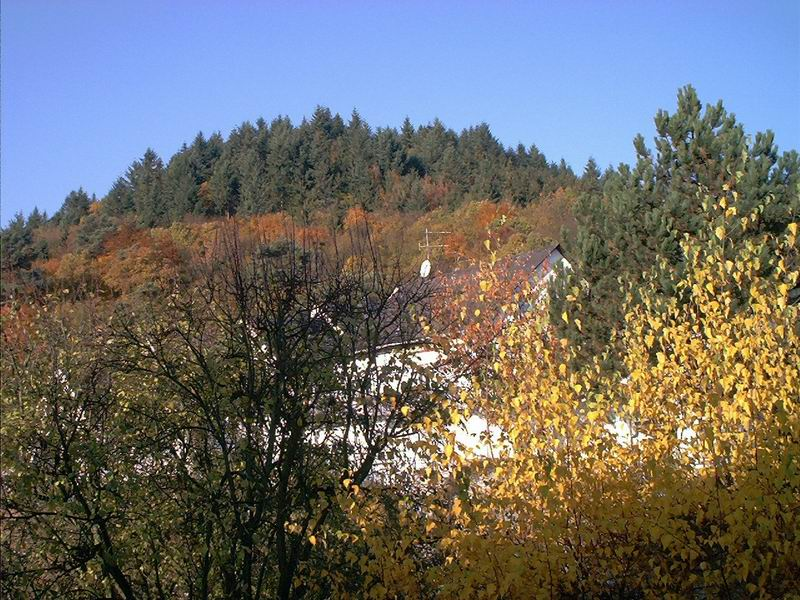
Hills surrounding Fischbach

The town lies in the valley of a stream with the same name in the Taunus hills. It is north-west of central Kelheim and adjoins Hornau to the east. The town of Eppstein is to the west and Königstein im Taunus is northeast of Fischbach. The source of the Fischbach stream is in Ruppertshain. It flows through Fischbach and the Fischbachtal (Fishbachl valley) to merge with the Schwarzbach stream in Eppstein. Hill peaks around Fischbach are the Fischbacher Kopf, Staufen and Rossert. Fischbach is a dormitory town for many working in Frankfurt am Main.

=== Traffic ===
Bundesstraße 455 (federal highway 455) heads from Königstein via Fischbach to Eppstein and Wiesbaden. The former through road was substituted by a bypass in the early 1980s. The new road does not bypass Fischbach but crosses the town on an artificial embankment, with a bridge over the central street Langstraße. Bus routes connect Fischbach with Kelkheim railway station and the Frankfurt Transit system.

=== Structure of the town ===
The old town centre is situated at the intersection of the main roads from Kelkheim to the suburb of Ruppertshain and from Königstein to Eppstein. The first road, Langstraße, is the main road of the old part of the village. In the 19th century Fischbach grew along both streets, especially Kelkheimer Straße and Eppsteiner Straße. Fischbach's population swelled after World War II with refugees from areas that were ceded to other countries, leading to street names such as Egerländer Straße and Königsberger Straße. Residential areas were built on both sides of Kelkheimer Straße and on the south-side of the town, around Staufenstraße and Sodener Straße. In the north, only a small residential estate was built on a former brickyard area (An der Ziegelei). In the 1970s summer cottages were built on the road to Königstein, and are now year-round residences.

== History ==
=== Administrative history ===
Fischbach was founded by Franks. The first document which proves the existence of Fischbach (gift to Fulda convent), is dated in the year 780. In the 8th and 9th centuries, imperial laws appear. In 813, the village was in possession of Earl Liutfried as royal feud. Starting from 890 Fischbach was part of the shire of Uualahes and during Early and High Middle Ages a member of the Niddagau province.

In 1348 the Lords of Eppstein became the new rulers. In 1581 Fischbach became part of Archbishopric of Mainz and was governed from Königstein. After Napoleon split the Holy Roman Empire in 1806, Fischbach and the vicinity was part of Duchy of Nassau. Nassau was annexed by Prussia in 1866 degraded to Wiesbaden district of the Prussian province Hessen-Nassau. Fischbach attended to this administration till the foundation of Hesse in 1946.

After being integrated to Prussia, Fischbach belonged to the Upper-Taunus district. Since 1928 it was part of the newly founded Main-Taunus district. In 1977 Fischbach was incorporated to the city of Kelkheim, together with the former community Rossert (Ruppertshain and Eppenhain).

=== Coat of arms ===

The emblem shows the "chevrons of Eppstein" on the right as symbol of the former affiliation to the neighbour town. When Fischbach was part of Archbishopric of Mainz, the chevrons had been substituted by the "wheel of Mainz" (Mainzer Rad). It has been removed after Fischbach became part of Hessen-Nassau. The left field shows, according to the town name, two red fishes in a silver creek.

=== Economical and social history ===
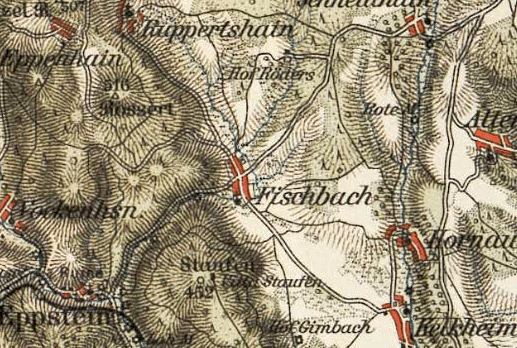
Fischbach, 1893

The economy of the village was based on agriculture and fruit-growing for centuries. Typically for the lower Taunus are fruit grasslands with apple trees. Since the beginning of the 19th century, many carpenters and joineries were located in the town. Different from Kelkheim, the furniture industry could not be conserved to the present. Besides, the clayey ground allowed setting up brickyards. Also the industry, especially Farbwerke in Höchst (Hoechst AG, today Industriepark Höchst), is a source of income since the late 19th century. The opening of railway line from Königstein to Höchst in 1901 improved the connections to Höchst and Frankfurt. Before that, many workers had to walk every morning to Soden railway station (approx. 8 km (5.0 mi)).

After World War II, Fischbach had about 1,000 inhabitants. Due to refugee settlement, mainly from Sudetenland, the number of residents was doubled. The village became even bigger in the 1960s and 1970s due to suburbanization. Fischbach changed from a small Taunus-village to a suburb of Frankfurt. The number of residents rose to about 6,000 in the early 1980s and has changed little since then.

Due to strong immigration of citizens from Frankfurt, the confessional (mainly Catholic in former times) and the social structure changed: In addition to the long-established village residents, mostly craftsmen and farmers, an academic affected middle-class appeared (employees of Hoechst AG)

== Points of interest ==
=== Church Saint Trinity ===
In 1781, church Saint Trinity substituted an older church which was built in 1686. The building contains some extravaganza of this time and provides an impressive view from the lower meadows nearby. The church contains the so-called “Roteltisstein”, a Christian tombstone from the 7th century. It was transferred to Fischbach in 1868 from a demolished pilgrim chapel nearby (Gimbach). The stone proves the early Christianisation in this region.

=== Church Saint John ===
Like everywhere in the former area of Archbishopric of Mainz, inhabitants of Fischbach were traditionally catholic. The result of the large number of Protestants immigrated after World War II, was a growing demand for a Protestant church. A community was founded in the 1960s and is named after John the Baptist. The church has a modern style and has big, coloured windows.

=== Rettershof ===
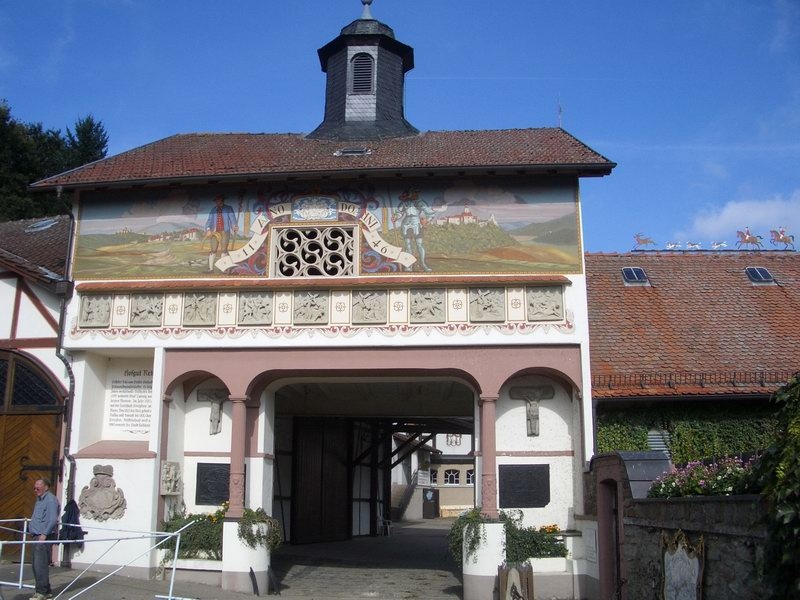
Hofgut Retters.

Rettershof, northeast of Fischbach, was founded in 1186 as a premonstratensian convent. During the Protestant Reformation, the landlord closed the convent in 1559 and converted it to a farm. The church of the convent was destroyed during the Thirty Years war. In 1884 an Englishman bought the manor and built a new mansion in Tudor style. His successors built a restaurant in 1938, which offered products from the farm. The city of Kelkheim bought Rettershof in 1980 and renovated it. Today, Rettershof consists of three parts: the historically styled yard of the manor, the former mansion and the restaurant. For some years in the 1908s the manor was the European headquarters of International Society for Krishna Consciousness. It is now a luxury hotel.

=== Gimbacher Hof ===
Though Hofgut Gimbach can only reached by car via Kelkheim, it belongs to Fischbach. The way from Fischbach to Gimbacher Hof is only for pedestrians and bikes. The way leads through land under environmental conservation.

Until 1868, Gimbach was the location of a pilgrim chapel. After its demolition the altar was transferred to Saint Trinity in Fischbach, but the Gimbach pilgrimage continues to this day.

Gimbacher Hof's name comes from the Gimbach, a stream that starts nearby when three tributaries join. The earliest known document of its existence dates to 1287, recorded as the "Gynnenbach".

The manor grounds are used for horse breeding, for growing and pressing Apfelwein, the local cider, and as for camping.

=== Hanseklingerbrunnen ===
The bronze fountain in the village center was created in 1987 by Johannes Norbert Klarmann. It depicts a craftsman drinking water from the fountain.

== Public facilities ==
Former town hall, today community center.

=== Bürgerhaus ===
The town hall of Fischbach was established shortly before the village was incorporated to Kelkheim. Today the building is community center, contains outposts of Kelkheim town authorities and is home for several clubs. The functional architecture is typical for buildings of the 1970s. Fire brigade facilities are also located at the town hall square.

=== Albert-von-Reinach school ===
Albert-von Reinach-school is an elementary school. It is located above the town hall square and consists of two buildings. The catchments area is equivalent to Fischbach area. The school is named after Albert von Reinach (* November 7, 1842 in Frankfurt am Main; † January 12, 1905). He was a banker from Frankfurt, who built a villa nearby the village. Albert von Reinach supported the school with noble donations. The older building was erected in 1952/54, the newer one in 1967. The complex replaced the old school building near St. Trinity church, which was placed there at least since 1822 and demolished in 1967. The first school in Fischbach was documented in 1604.

=== Staufen school / Eichendorff school / Gesamtschule Fischbach ===
The Staufenschule was a school for children from Fischbach, Hornau, Ruppertshain and Eppenhain. It was absorbed into the Eichendorff school on 31 July 2006. Due to rising student numbers the Eichendorff school's homonymous sister located in Kelkheim-Mitte has separated from Fischbach's school. It has been renamed to Gesamtschule Fischbach (General school of Fischbach, GSF) and put under its own administration in 2018.

=== Staufenhalle ===
After a long planning period, a new sports hall opened in 2002. The “Staufenhalle” replaced an old version from 1971. The hall is the largest roofed room in Kelkheim. It has a small stand and is used by schools and sports clubs.

=== Sports field ===
Open air sports events take place on Fischbach sports field. It is beside woods in the west end of the village. It is mainly used for football matches of the local football club SV Fischbach and was opened on 31 May 1930. In 1952 the area was modified. The ground was rotated by 90 degrees and changing rooms were built. The sports field reopened on 2 August 1953. In 1982 the facilities were renovated and a house for club activities was built. The sports field was equipped with an artificial turf during summer 2008.

== Events ==
Fischbach celebrates carnival every year in February or March, with a Carnival Monday parade attracting approximately 25,000 visitors.

Kermesse (Kerb) is celebrated each autumn on town hall square. during this time.

The Protestant church community celebrates Saint John's day (June 24).

The Hanseklinger festival in late summer is celebrated in the village center around the homonymous fountain.
