= Schwarzbach (Main) =

River in Germany

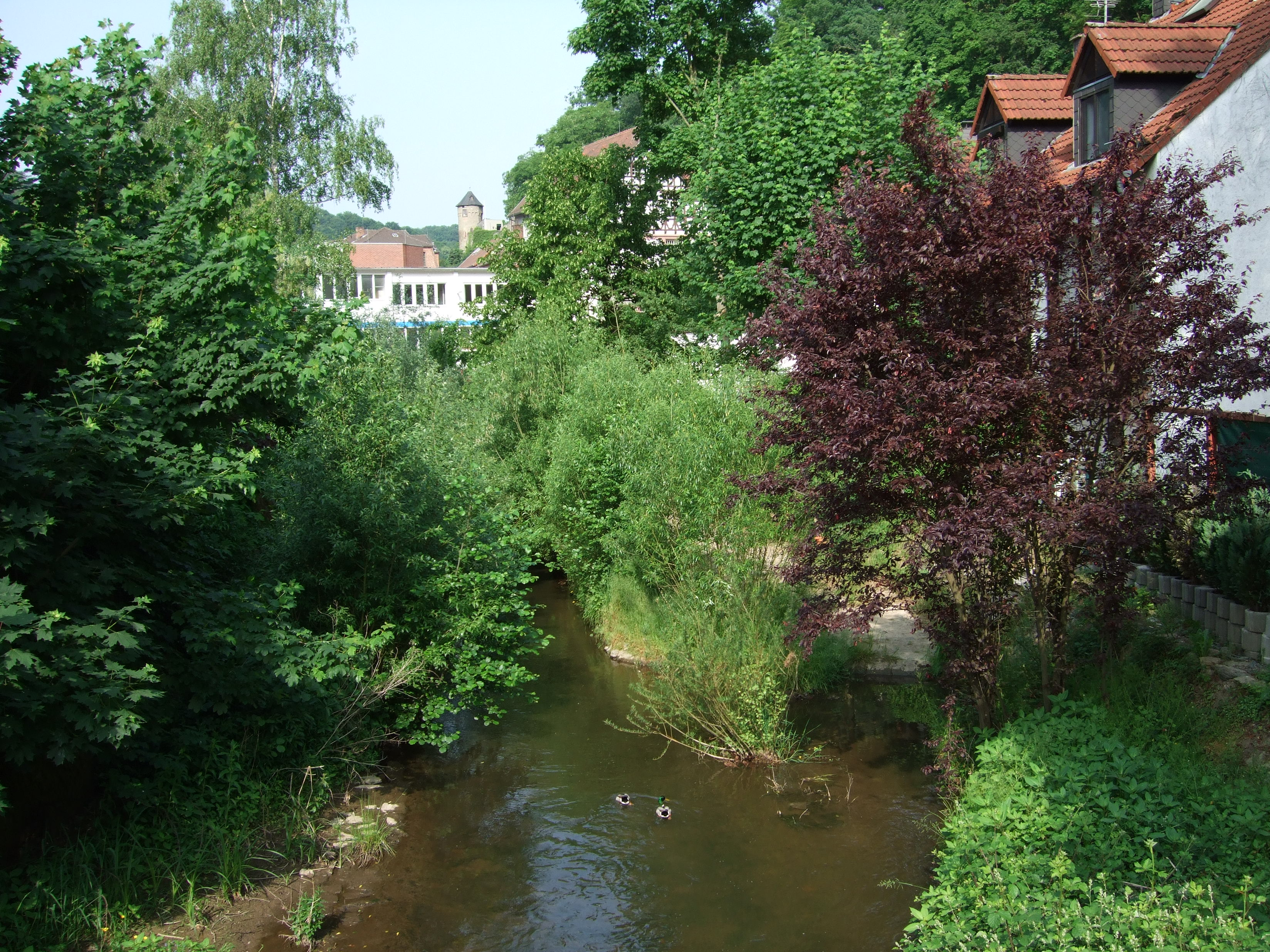

Location
- Country: Germany
- State: Hesse

Physical characteristics
- Mouth
  - location: Main
  - coordinates: 50°03′17″N 8°30′31″E
- Length: 32.0 km (19.9 mi)
- Basin size: 135 km^{2} (52 sq mi)

Basin features
- Progression: Main→ Rhine→ North Sea

Schwarzbach (German pronunciation: [ˈʃvaʁtsˌbax]; in its upper course: Dattenbach) is a river of Hesse, Germany. It is a right tributary of the Main in Hattersheim am Main.

== See also ==
- List of rivers of Hesse
