= 330th Infantry Division =

- German: 330. Infanterie-Division
- Active: 19 December 1941 – 2 November 1943
- Country: Nazi Germany
- Branch: Heer
- Type: Infantry
- Size: Division
- Engagements: World War II: Eastern Front; Case Anton

Commanders
- Commander: Karl Graf (17/12/1941); Edwin von Rothkirch (5/1/1942); Georg Zwade (22/6/1942); Wilhelm Falley (23/9/1943); Hans Sauerbrey (5/10/1943)

The 330th Infantry Division was an infantry division of the German army during World War II. It was active between 1941 and 1943.

== Operational history ==
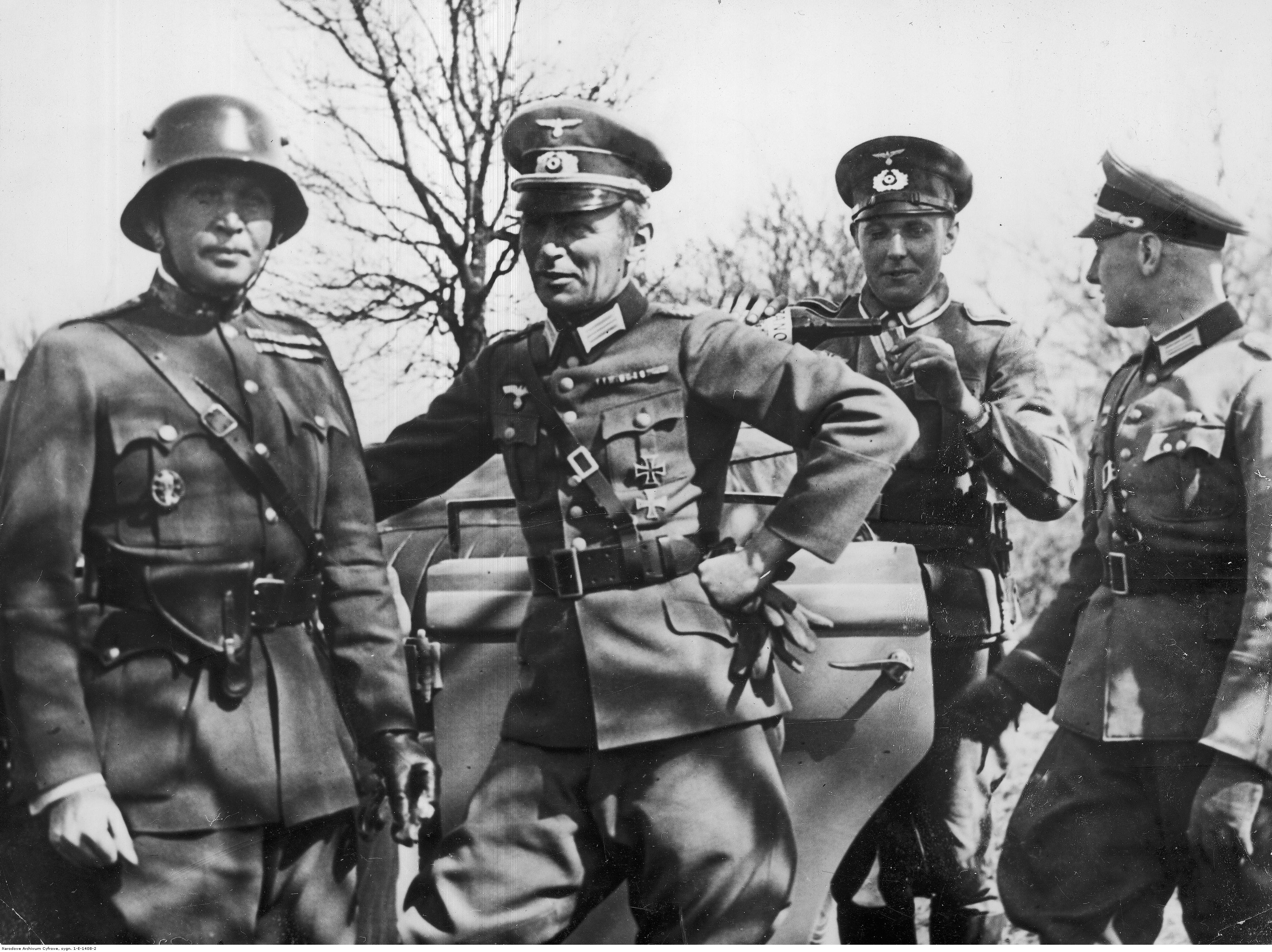
Edwin Graf von Rothkirch und Trach commanded the 330th Infantry Division between 5 January and 22 June 1942.

The 330th Infantry Division was assembled on 19 December 1941 as one of the valkyrie divisions of the 17th wave of deployment. Initially deployed on the Wandern military base, it was prepared for deployment to the Eastern Front. The initial divisional commander was Karl Graf, who was soon replaced by Edwin Graf von Rothkirch und Trach on 5 January 1942. The division consisted of three infantry regiments (554, 555, 556) of two battalions each, for a total of six infantry battalions, as well as Artillery Regiment 330 with two detachments and the Division Units 330.

The division deployed to the Eastern Front on foot from Siedlce. Here, it was attached to LIX Army Corps (initially under 3rd Panzer Army) from February to October 1942. Georg Zwade took divisional command on 22 June 1942. In November, the division briefly served with XXXXI Panzer Corps before joining VI Army Corps from December 1942 to August 1943.

On 9 April 1943, the 556th Regiment (now renamed Grenadier Regiment 556, as were the other previous Infantry Regiments) was dissolved and its battalions attached to the 554th and 555th regiments, resulting in a division of two regiments with three battalions each, but not changing the overall number of grenadier battalions in the division.

In September 1943, the 330th Infantry Division was reattached once more, this time to IX Army Corps under 4th Army. This remained the division's final assignment, as the formation was dissolved on 2 November 1943. Units from Grenadier Regiment 554 were subsequently used to form Division Group 330, which went on to serve with the 342nd Infantry Division under XII Army Corps of 4th Army, before being once more renamed to Grenadier Regiment 554 on 27 July 1944. The final divisional commanders had been Wilhelm Falley (appointed 23 September 1943) and Hans Sauerbrey (appointed 5 October 1943).

== Noteworthy individuals ==
- Karl Graf: divisional commander, 17 December 1941 – 5 January 1942
- Edwin Graf von Rothkirch und Trach: divisional commander, 5 January – 22 June 1942; later commander of LIII Army Corps
- Georg Zwade: divisional commander, 22 June 1942 – 23 September 1943; later commander of LXXII Army Corps
- Wilhelm Falley: divisional commander, 23 September – 5 October 1943; later commander of 91st Infantry Division and the first German general killed in action on the Second Western Front on 6 June 1944
- Hans Sauerbrey: divisional commander, 5 October – 2 November 1943
