= 444th Security Division =

- 444. Sicherungs-Division
- Active: 1941–1944
- Country: Nazi Germany
- Branch: Army (Wehrmacht)
- Type: Security division
- Size: Division
- Engagements: World War II

Commanders
- Notable commanders: Helge Auleb

The 444th Security Division (444. Sicherungs-Division) was a rear-security division in the Wehrmacht of Nazi Germany. The unit was deployed in German-occupied areas of the Soviet Union, in the Army Group South Rear Area.

== Operational history ==
=== Division z.b.V. 444 ===
The Division z.b.V. 444 was established on 25 October 1939 in Darmstadt, which was in the XII Military District. It was renamed to 444th Security Division in mid-March 1941.

=== 444th Security Division ===
The division was formed on 15 March 1941 near Ohlau in Silesia, in the VIII Military District, from the staff of Division z.b.V. 444 and elements of the 221st Infantry Division. During the whole war, the 444th Security Division operated in the occupied Ukraine and Southern Russia regions behind Army Group South's front lines.

Its duties included security of communications and supply lines, economic exploitation and combatting partisans in Wehrmacht's rear areas in conjunction with nearby German units. Along with other security and police forces in the occupied territories, the division participated in war crimes against prisoners of war and the civilian population. The division was subordinated to Karl von Roques, commander of Army Group South Rear Area. Similar to 454th Security Division, it undertook "cleansing actions" in the areas that the locals claimed harboured "partisans" (the term "partisan" was used interchangeably with "commissar", "Bolshevik", "Jew" and "guerrilla").

From November 1941, the division was ordered to recruit a Turkic unit among the prisoners of war in the prison camps. Hence, a Turkestan regiment (of four companies) was created in November 1942. In early January 1943, now in Army Group A, six Kalmykian cavalry squadrons were placed under the command of the division as the Kalmyk detachment. In February 1943, it was subordinated to the 4th Panzer Army, then to the Armee-Abteilung Hollidt and its successor, the 6th Army. During this period, the division's security measures, which were described as non-combative, took place between Rostov and Mius.

At the beginning of 1944, both security regiments were removed and in May 1944 the division was completely dissolved.

== Commanders ==
Commanding officers

No.	Portrait	Commander	Took office	Left office	Time in office
1	Alois Josef Ritter von Molo	Generalmajor; Alois Josef Ritter von Molo	25 October 1939	April 1941	1 year, 158 days
2	Wilhelm Rußwurm	Generalleutnant; Wilhelm Rußwurm	April 1941	February 1942	306 days
3	Helge Auleb	Generalleutnant; Helge Auleb	February 1942	March 1942 (transferred to 403rd Security Division)	28 days
4	Adalbert Mikulicz	Generalmajor/Generalleutnant; Adalbert Mikulicz	March 1942	May 1944	2 years, 61 days

== Composition ==
=== 1942 ===
- 46th Territorial Guard Regimental Staff (Landesschützen-Regimentsstab 46)
- Reinforced 360th Infantry Regiment (verstärktes Infanterie-Regiment 360) (originally from the 221st Infantry Division, later assigned to the 111th Infantry Division, and then in the 454th Security Division renamed to 360th Security Regiment)
- 708th Guard Battalion (Wach-Bataillon 708)
- 2nd Battalion of the 221st Artillery Regiment (II./Artillerie-Regiment 221) (from the 221st Infantry Division)
- 828th Signals Battalion (Divisions-Nachrichten-Abteilung 828) (created in November 1941 from the Feld-Nachrichten-Kommandantur 44)
- 444th Cossack Company (Kosaken-Hundertschaft 444) (later assigned to the 454th Security Division)
- 444th Turkestan Company (Turkestanische Hundertschaft 444)
- 445th Beutepanzer Company (Panzer-Kompanie 445 aus Beutepanzern)
- 360th Divisional Services (Divisionseinheiten 360)

=== 1943 ===
- 46th Security Regiment (Sicherungs-Regiment 46) (Assigned to the Korück 558 of the 8th Army in 1944)
- 602nd Security Regiment (Sicherungs-Regiment 602) (Assigned to the Korück 558 of the 8th Army in 1944)
- 828th Signals Battalion (Nachrichten-Abteilung 828)
- Kommandeur der Divisions-Nachschubtruppen 360

== See also ==
- War crimes of the Wehrmacht
