= Army Group Rear Area Command =

- Befehlshaber des rückwärtigen Heeresgebietes
- Active: 1941–45
- Country: Nazi Germany
- Branch: German Army
- Part of: Army High Command (OKH)
- Engagements: World War II

Commanders
- Notable commanders: Eduard Wagner

Army Group Rear Area Command (German: Befehlshaber des rückwärtigen Heeresgebietes, abbreviated as Berück) was an area of military jurisdiction behind each of the three Wehrmacht army groups from 1941, the German invasion of the Soviet Union in Operation Barbarossa, through 1944 when the pre-war territories of the Soviet Union were recovered. The areas were sites of mass murder during the Holocaust and other crimes against humanity targeting the civilian population.

== Background and planning ==
During the early stages of the planning for the invasion of the Soviet Union, Operation Barbarossa, the rear areas behind the front lines were envisioned to be subordinated to the respective armies, as they had during the invasion of Poland. By early April 1941, however, the military planners decided to limit the areas of army jurisdiction (Army Rear Area), with the bulk of the territory to be controlled by the Army Group Rear Areas.

The planners envisioned that the occupied territories would quickly pass on to civilian administration; thus, the directives called for the Army Group Rear Areas commanders to concentrate on the security of lines of communication and important military installations, such as storage depots and aerodromes. Army Group Rear Areas were also responsible for the transfer of prisoners of war to the rear.

== Organisation ==
Army Group North, Army Group Centre and Army Group South Rear Area Commands were responsible for the rear area security in their respective areas of operation. Each had a headquarters subordinated to the corresponding army group, while also reporting to the Wehrmacht Quartermaster General Eduard Wagner, who had responsibility for rear security. Each Army Group Rear Area had a propaganda company, for propaganda activities aimed at the civilian population.

Army Group Rear Area commanders controlled nine Security Divisions, tasked with security of communications and supply lines, economic exploitation and combating irregular fighters (partisans) behind the front line. Security Divisions also oversaw units of the Geheime Feldpolizei (Secret Field Police) of the Wehrmacht. Rear Area commanders operated in parallel with the Higher SS and Police Leaders appointed by the head of the SS, Heinrich Himmler, for each of the army group rear areas. In the words of historian Michael Parrish, these army commanders "presided over an empire of terror and brutality".

== Security warfare and atrocities ==
The area commanders' duties included security of communications and supply lines, economic exploitation and combating guerillas (partisans) in Wehrmacht's rear areas. In addition to the Wehrmacht security forces, the SS and the SD formations operated in the same areas, under the command of the respective Higher SS and Police Leaders. These units included Einsatzgruppen detachments, three police regiments (North, Centre and South), the Waffen-SS units of the Kommandostab Reichsführer-SS, and Order Police battalions of the Ordnungspolizei. All of these units perpetrated mass murder during The Holocaust in the areas of military jurisdiction.

In 1941 Max von Schenckendorff, commander of Army Group Centre Rear Area, organised the Mogilev Conference to share experiences of security and anti-partisan operations. The conference marked increased violence against civilians, the full cooperation of Wehrmacht with the SS and SD and carrying out genocidal actions of their own.

The security formations, often in coordination with or under the leadership of the Wehrmacht, conducted security operations against the civilian population, under the doctrine of Partisanenkrieg (later Bandenbekämpfung, or "gang fighting"). "Anti-partisan operations" in "bandit-infested" areas amounted to destruction of villages, seizure of livestock, deporting of able-bodied population for slave labour to Germany and murder of those of non-working age. In its reports, the Wehrmacht units euphemistically described the operations as "elimination of partisan nests, partisan camps, partisan bunkers". Their records show that in the early phases of the occupation, in 1941–42, Wehrmacht security divisions lost one soldier killed for every 100 "partisans" that died, with the Jewish population making up the majority of the victims. In the Army Group Centre Rear Area, 80,000 "suspected partisans" were killed between June 1941 and May 1942, for 1,094 German casualties.

== Commanders ==
Army Group North Rear Area

No.	Portrait	Commander	Took office	Left office	Time in office	Ref.
1	Franz von Roques	General of the Infantry; Franz von Roques (1887–1967)	16 March 1941	1 April 1943	2 years, 16 days	
2	Kuno-Hans von Both	General of the Infantry; Kuno-Hans von Both (1884–1955)	1 April 1943	30 March 1944	364 days	

Army Group Centre Rear Area

No.	Portrait	Commander	Took office	Left office	Time in office	Ref.
1	Max von Schenckendorff	General of the Infantry; Max von Schenckendorff (1875–1943)	16 March 1941	6 July 1943 †	2 years, 16 days	
-	Ludwig Kübler	General der Gebirgstruppe; Ludwig Kübler (1889–1947); Acting	22 July 1943	1 October 1943	71 days	
2	Edwin Graf von Rothkirch und Trach	General of the Cavalry; Edwin Graf von Rothkirch und Trach (1888–1980)	1 October 1943	1 July 1944	274 days	

Ludwig Kübler was captured in Yugoslavia and after the war tried and executed for war crimes.

Army Group South Rear Area

No.	Portrait	Commander	Took office	Left office	Time in office	Ref.
1	Karl von Roques	General of the Infantry; Karl von Roques (1880–1949)	15 March 1941	27 October 1941	7 months	
-	Erich Friderici	General of the Infantry; Erich Friderici (1885–1967); Acting	27 October 1941	9 January 1942	2 months	
(1)	Karl von Roques	General of the Infantry; Karl von Roques (1880–1949)	9 January 1942	31 December 1942	11 months	
2	Erich Friderici	General of the Infantry; Erich Friderici (1885–1967)	31 December 1942	February 1943	1 month	
3	Joachim Witthöft	General of the Infantry; Joachim Witthöft (1887–1966) as Army Group B Rear Area	February 1943	27 October 1943	8 months	
4	Friedrich Mieth	General of the Infantry; Friedrich Mieth (1888–1944) as Army Group Don Rear Area	27 October 1943	2 September 1944	10 months	

Von Roques was convicted of war crimes at the High Command Trial held at Nuremberg and sentenced to twenty years imprisonment.

== See also ==
- Chief of Civil Administration
