= Marching into Darkness =

2014 history book by Waitman Wade Beorn

Marching into Darkness: The Wehrmacht and the Holocaust in Belarus
- Author: Waitman Wade Beorn
- Language: English
- Genre: History; Historiography
- Publisher: Harvard University Press
- Publication date: 2014
- Publication place: United States
- Media type: Print
- ISBN: 978-0-674-72550-8

Marching into Darkness: The Wehrmacht and the Holocaust in Belarus is a book by the American historian Waitman Wade Beorn, published in 2014 by Harvard University Press. It discusses the participation of the German Wehrmacht in the Holocaust and other crimes against humanity during the course of the early stages of the German–Soviet War (1941–1945).

The book has received positive reviews for its thorough and convincing analysis of the complicity of the German armed forces in the crimes of the Nazi regime. One reviewer praised Beorn's work as (to date) "the most important to this crucial area of the Holocaust history, of military history, and of Germany's history" in the English language.

== Themes ==
Marching into Darkness examines the complicity of the German Wehrmacht in the crimes committed against Jews and other civilians in Belarus, from autumn 1941 to early in the subsequent winter. The author looks at several military formations and how they responded to orders to commit genocide and other crimes against humanity. Beorn finds that those who refused were only lightly punished (or not punished at all), debunking the claims of German veterans that they had to participate under threat of death.

The author investigates how so-called anti-partisan warfare was connected to the Holocaust via its ideological targeting of "Jewish-Bolsheviks". Beorn concludes that, because antisemitic sentiment was lower in Belarus compared to the territories of Army Group North and Army Group South Rear Areas, the army troops played a significantly larger role in direct persecution of Jews during the period that he studied.

Beorn addresses other aspects of Wehrmacht crimes, such as murder of Soviet prisoners of war and support for Nazi Germany's starvation policy, the Hunger Plan. He examines what he calls "the progressive complicity" of the Wehrmacht, highlighting the main developments that led to the escalation of violence, such as the Mogilev conference in September 1941. Organised by the commander of the Army Group Centre Rear Area, it brought together the Army, the SS and the Order Police commanders for a so-called exchange of experiences, and marked a dramatic escalation of violence against the civilian population.

== Reception ==
The historian Ben H. Shepherd comments in The English Historical Review that Beorn "has produced a highly impressive, engagingly written work that significantly advances the understanding of the dynamics that shaped the murderous anti-Semitic actions of Wehrmacht units down to the level of companies and battalions".

Commenting on Beorn's research into Wehrmacht complicity in Nazi crimes in a 2015 review in The American Historical Review, historian Thomas Kühne calls the book, the "most convincing, the most complex, and in the English language certainly the most important to this crucial area of the Holocaust history, of military history, and of Germany history". He finds that the book will "serve as a model for similar studies".

Historian Henning Pieper in German History also praises the book for its thorough analysis and concludes:

From Beorn's concise and well-written work, a disturbing concept emerges: that of a military apparatus which, despite singular efforts to actually moderate conduct (...), proved to be the perfect tool for the brutal pacification of future Lebensraum. Not only did Hitler’s soldiers help to lay waste to the concept of humanity; their crimes also went largely unpunished after 1945 and were too painful for later generations of Germans to acknowledge them until almost the twenty-first century.

A review in Omaha World-Herald suggests that the book "ought to be on the reading list of anyone interested in the German army or battles on the Eastern Front in World War II". Although the book is more scholarly than a popular history book, it should be accessible to the general reader. The reviewer finds that "one comes away from reading the book with a renewed appreciation for the importance of military ethics, leadership and following the laws of war".

== Awards and honours ==
- 2014 Thomas J. Wilson Memorial Prize, Harvard University Press
- Honorable Mention, 2015 Sybil Halpern Milton Memorial Book Prize, German Studies Association
- Award for Best Publication, 2015 International Congress of Belarusian Studies (multiple awarded)

== See also ==
- Myth of the clean Wehrmacht
- The Myth of the Eastern Front
- Hitler's War in the East
