= Operation Bamberg =

1942 Nazi security operation in Belarus

- Part of World War II
Date	26 March – 6 April 1942 (1 week and 4 days)
Location	Hlusk District, Babruysk, Polesia, Byelorussia
Result	German victory

Belligerents
Germany; Slovakia	(Byelorussian Soviet Socialist Republic) Belarusian partisans

Commanders and leaders
Theodor von Bechtolsheim	Unknown

Strength
707th Security Division; 315th Order Police battalion Slovak Infantry Regiment	Unknown

Casualties and losses
(Nazi Germany) 7 killed (Nazi Germany) 47 weapons captured	4,396 civilians and partisans killed

Operation Bamberg was a Nazi security warfare operation during the Occupation of Belarus by Nazi Germany. The pilot project for offensive "anti-partisan" fighting was the operation Bamberg in the area of Hlusk District-Pariczi-Oktiabrskij to the south of Bobrujsk, in the eastern Polesie.

== History ==
Mogilev Region in the Byelorussian SSR

The operation had already been prepared since 26 February 1942 from the southerly Regional Commissariat Zhytomyr by actions of the Slovakian Infantry Regiment with the subordinated 325th Order Police battalion in the area Mozyr-Szitkowiczi, which probably claimed more than 1,000 lives. This action seems to have been held up by the fact that the commander of the police battalion, a major of the Order Police (Schutzpolizei) did not mobilize his troops for some time. From the north the operation was to be conducted not by the 203rd Security Division, responsible for the area, but by the 707th Security Division, which had been transferred specifically for this purpose from the Regional Commissariat White Ruthenia. During a preliminary meeting on 8 March Max von Schenckendorff, commander of Army Group Centre Rear Area, thanked the Security Police and the SD for their support so far and assured them that for the success of the great action they were absolutely necessary. The operation plan of the 203rd Security Division defined as tasks:

A) Annihilation of the main partisan bands.
B) Pacification of the country.
C) Collection of grain and livestock.

While this division, which also foresaw a bombing of four villages from the air, still recommended to make a distinction between the guilty and the innocent, demanding that only truly guilty and elements alien to the localities are to be shot, the 707th Security Division from the start planned no broad development, i.e. against the partisans in the forest areas, which was said to be impossible due to snow and ice and the beginning of the mud period soon to be expected, but a proceeding along the streets and mainly against the villages in the area of operation, where most partisans could in the meantime have established themselves. The commander Bechtolsheim ordered that during this action the crimes against Jews and people alien to a locality, as carried out with success in White Ruthenia, especially in the autumn months of 1941, were to be imitated with all harshness: The respective instructions for ruthless action against men, women and children also apply for the new operation area.

Operation Bamberg already showed all essential tactical elements and procedures that were to become typical of the later actions and fateful for the population of the affected areas. Between 26 March and 6 April 1942, within 12 days, the reinforced 707th Security Division, the Slovakian Infantry Regiment and the 315th Order Police battalion destroyed a series of villages in a broken through forest area between Oktiabrskij and Kopakewiczi and murdered their inhabitants. In Chwoineja (Chojno) 1,350 people were locked into their houses and killed by hand grenades and burning, in Rudnia (Rudnia, Gmina Czarna Białostocka?, Rudnia, Gmina Michałowo?) 800 persons were collected and shot in groups (the men first had to undress), in Oktiabrskij 190 persons were burned alive inside the club house, the inhabitants of Kurin were in part shot, in part burned alive, similar as in Kowali, where the children were burned. The number of Belarusian dead was officially put at about 3,500 by the Germans, but the actual number was much higher. The partisans estimated it at 5,000, and according to the listing by Romanowski et al 4,396 people died in 15 localities alone.

The actions that took place before and afterwards in the surrounding areas are not included in these figures, which means it must be assumed that at least 6,000 people were murdered. The great majority of them were locally residing peasants and non-fugitive Jews, who were also targeted by the operation. It is justified to speak of people murdered, for there was hardly any fighting, there was no greater resistance to be broken, which is not surprising for actions against villages. The losses of the German and allied troops during the core action were merely seven dead and eight wounded, 47 rifles and machine pistols were captured. The partisans in the area, whose number was estimated at 1,200 to 2,000 men, got away.

Like almost all later major actions against partisans or those around them, operation Bamberg consisted of four phases:

Phase 1: Executing a large encirclement, in this case with a diameter of 25–30 kilometres (16–19 mi), until 28 March inclusively.
Phase 2: Tightening the encirclement - in this case until 31 March inclusively,
Phase 3: The so-called clearing out of the cauldron in the form of the last concentric attack - in this case on 1 and 2 April, and
Phase 4: The so-called mopping up backwards - here the repeated thorough cleaning and crossing of the area in backward direction up to the second initial position, during which the villages and farmsteads lying inside the inner target area were destroyed together with the majority of their inhabitants, in this case between 3 and 6 April (see figure 4).

Fighting with the partisans and losses on the German side were most frequent in the third phase. The infamous mass crimes, the destruction of villages and the murder of their inhabitants, occurred in phase 3 and mainly in phase 4, when after conclusion of the coordinated military advance with daily objectives to be reached under all circumstances more time was left therefor. This depopulation was always planned in advance. Only thereafter was the operation considered as concluded. In phase 4 there also commenced the more or less organized plundering of agricultural products of the affected area, the so-called collection.

The key importance of the 4th phase becomes apparent from several sources about operations of so-called fighting against bandits, such as a passage in the diary of Bach-Zelewski wherein the operation of so-called mopping up is criticized, which would always lead to a great number of destroyed "bandit" subjects as its object was to annihilate the population sympathizing with the Bolsheviks rather than the partisans. This can be proven not only for the operations mentioned in this context, Nürnberg and Erntefest II, but also for instance for Sumpffieber, Franz and Hornung. The number of victims accordingly went up during the respective final phase, like in operation Bamberg. It is not without reason that the SS and Police Commander of White Ruthenia, Curt von Gottberg, wrote the following about the final phase of operation Nürnberg: What followed was then more or less a hare hunt.

Another typical feature of such operations was the setting of daily objectives practiced during Operation Bamberg. Units had to cover a certain distance until an established final point during a day while mopping up all localities. The further away the daily objective was, the greater the probability, that there was no time for an exact investigation as to who supported the partisans (and for the collection of agricultural products) and thus the tendency was to kill everyone around. The possibility of allowing many people to run away was often not considered by the executing units because the inhabitants of the affected areas were generally seen as sympathizers of the partisans. To need to set such daily objectives resulted from the inner logic of such an operation under participation of various units for a coordinated proceeding. Thus the remote message post of Combat Group von Gottberg during the Operation Frühlingsfest sent and received 3,500 remote messages. The determination of what distance was to be covered until the respective daily objectives, however, contained a conscious preliminary decision on the procedure inside the villages. The troops were thus put under pressure. Daily distances of up to 30 kilometers with a crossing and mopping up, i.e. a march with combat actions and searching of the villages, such as Himmler considered possible, indicated an annihilation intention present from the very start. Sometimes the closing of the cauldron failed wholly due to a too stretched target area, to great daily objectives and too splintered German forces. If - as during later operations such as Weichsel - more laborers were to be collected, on the other hand, a most thorough searching and short daily objectives were ordered.

Yet another typical feature was the carrying out of investigations and verifications, examinations and interrogations in the villages, mainly by GFP (Geheime Feldpolizei = Secret Field Police) and SD, as in the case of Bamberg. Given the great marching distances their anyway dubious activity was reduced to identify not persons, but villages suspect of partisan activity and suggesting the next targets of verification. These commandos often also carried out a part of the executions. The support by the Luftwaffe in the form or reconnaissance and combat flights, which later became a rule, also existed already during Operation Bamberg.

The same applied to the activity of agriculture officials (in this case 24), given that an essential goal of the action was the confiscation of agricultural products. The task was the total encirclement and annihilation of the partisan groups and the securing and pacification of this area, in order to collect the stocks of agricultural products and take them away, reported General Major v. Bechtolsheim. Instead of the expected at least 10–20,000 units of cattle the reported booty consisted of only 2,454 cattle, 2,286 sheep, 115 tons of grain, 120 tons of potatoes and more. In this respect fundamental difficulties for the Germans showed up, which were also characteristic of later actions. The affected area had until then delivered no agrarian products to the Germans (no collection at all so far due to partisan activity). The economy staff in Bobrujsk had prior to the operation suggested to either occupy the area militarily on a constant basis or to carry out a total collection including the last cow and the seed grain, which would lead to a deterioration of the mood of the population. For a longer occupation there were not enough troops, however, and the total collection was a task almost impossible to solve due to transportation difficulties caused by the weather. From the point of view of the agriculture authorities the operation was thus condemned to fail as a collection operation, given that the confiscation remained a partial success and the so-called pacification as a pre-condition for a long-term exploitation of labor did not occur. As will be shown, the agrarian administration could nevertheless consider the strategy of the great operations against partisans to make sense due to other reasons.

The development and results of Operation Bamberg were followed with attention by high and highest authorities. The commander of the rear area of Army Group Center, for instance, constantly kept himself informed. While he internally remarked that the result had been not fully satisfactory because the partisans had got away and among those reported by the division as partisan helpers there seem to have been many who had only very loose connections to the partisans, he congratulated the 707th infantry division nevertheless on its having annihilated 3,000 partisans. Army Group Center and its supreme commander v. Kluge also let themselves be informed on a regular basis. Also informed were the head of the administration department at the Army High Command/Quartermaster General, Schmidt v. Altenstedt, General Quarter Master Wagner himself and through him also Hitler.

The Major Actions were not invented with Operation Bamberg. An action near Sewsk (Sjwosk) to the south of Lokot in the Briańsk area, apparently in support of the local self-administration district of Russian collaborators and claiming 1,936 lives, had been carried out shortly before by a Hungarian unit. (Here also the Germans thus tried to transfer the responsibility to allied troops.) It was the Operation Bamberg, however, that became a model in many respects.

The operation Bamberg was the beginning of a series of campaigns of plunder, murder and deportation against the peasant population of Belarus in the surroundings of the partisan areas.

Some Slovak soldiers were involved in the operation, on the German side.
