= Mogilev Conference =

1941 German army conference

- Date: 24–26 September 1941
- Location: Mogilev, German-occupied Byelorussia
- Type: Wehrmacht conference
- Theme: Security warfare
- Organised by: Max von Schenckendorff, commander of Army Group Centre Rear Area
- Participants: Erich von dem Bach-Zelewski, HSSPF for Army Group Centre; Arthur Nebe, commander of Einsatzgruppe B Hermann Fegelein, commander of the SS Cavalry Brigade; Max Montua, commander of Police Regiment Centre
- Outcome: 16-page conference summary distributed to rear security units
- Casualties: 32 Jewish civilians shot in a field exercise

The Mogilev Conference was a September 1941 Wehrmacht training event aimed at improving security in the rear of Army Group Centre during the German invasion of the Soviet Union. The event was organised by General Max von Schenckendorff, commander of Army Group Centre Rear Area, in cooperation with the officials of the security and intelligence services of Nazi Germany—SS and the Sicherheitsdienst (Security Service; SD)—operating in the same area. Ostensibly an "anti-partisan" training conference, the event marked an escalation of violence against Jews and other civilians in the areas under Schenckendorff's command.

== Background ==
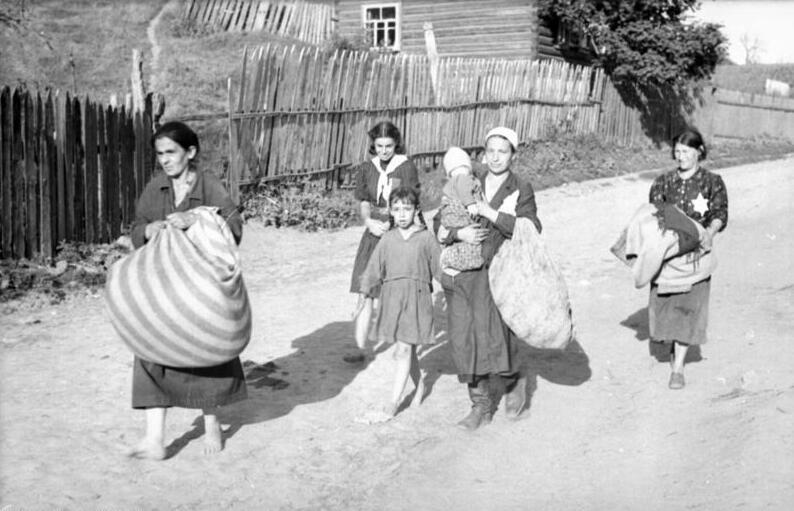
Wehrmacht propaganda photograph of Jewish women in Mogilev, July 1941. Six thousand Mogilev Jews were murdered by SS forces and units of Police Regiment Centre in October 1941.

In June 1941, the Axis Powers launched Operation Barbarossa, the invasion of the Soviet Union, and by 26 July 1941, Mogilev (locally Mahilyow), Byelorussian SSR, had been occupied by the Wehrmacht. Army Group Centre Rear Area, commanded by General Max von Schenckendorff, established its headquarters there on 7 September, but members of Einsatzgruppe B had entered the city in August and already begun murdering Jews. A ghetto was later established in September; in October 1941, most of the inmates had been murdered as part of two operations.

The Wehrmacht's aggressive security doctrine—and the use of the "security threat" to disguise genocidal policies—resulted in close cooperation between the army and the security apparatus behind the front lines. Einsatzgruppe B was the key killing unit that operated in the territory of Army Group Centre Rear Area, killing thousands of Jews, Communists and Soviet POWs handed over by the army for execution as well as other "undesirables", such as Roma ("Gypsies"), "Asiatics", and the mentally disabled. In July, Einsatzgruppe B commander Arthur Nebe reported that a "solution to the Jewish problem" was "impractical" in his region of operation due to "the overwhelming number of the Jews", that is there were too many Jews to be killed by too few men. By August 1941, Nebe came to realize that his Einsatzgruppe's resources were insufficient to meet the expanded mandate of the killing operations, due to the inclusion of Jewish women and children since that month.

The SS Cavalry Brigade, made up of the 1st and 2nd SS Cavalry Regiments, also participated in mass murder activities targeting Jews in the Byelorussian SSR. In July and August 1941, the unit carried out the Pripyat Marshes massacres resulting in the murder of over 11,000 Jewish civilians. The operation has since been considered a turning point in the transition from "selective mass murder" to the wholesale extermination of the Jewish population in occupied areas. Units of Police Regiment Centre had, by that time, also conducted mass murder of Jews.

In that environment, Schenckendorff, in cooperation with Erich von dem Bach-Zelewski, the Higher SS and Police Leader for Army Group Centre, organised a three-day conference for security troops. Held in Mogilev, the meeting aimed to create an "exchange of experiences" for the Wehrmacht rear unit commanders. Police Colonel Max Montua, commander of Police Regiment Centre, was in charge of planning and logistics.

== The conference ==
The conference began on 24 September and focused on "combatting partisans" (Bekämpfung von Partisanen, later Bandenbekämpfung) and reflected Schenckendorff's views on the need for total eradication of the resistance to German forces as the only way to secure the occupied territories. The minutes of the conference, if they had been taken, did not survive. What is known of the conference is based on the agenda, the list of attendees, after-action reports, and the summary distributed by Schenckendorff after the event.

=== Attendees and speakers ===
Invited officers were selected on the basis of their previous participation in security operations, and included representatives of the Army High Command and Army Group Centre. The audience also included battalion commanders and higher-level officers from both SS-Police and the Wehrmacht, including its security divisions, the 221st, the 286th, and the 403rd. In total, 61 officers participated, with 82 percent of attendees coming from Wehrmacht units. Of the attendees, 38 percent were battalion and company-level commanders.

Many had already participated in mass atrocities. For example, the attendees included the commander of the 3rd Battalion in the 354th Infantry Regiment, 286th Security Division. A week prior to the conference, the battalion assisted Einsatzkommando 8 and directly participated in the murder of 1,000 Jews in the town of Krupki.

The speakers included: Arthur Nebe, commander of Einsatzgruppe B; Erich von dem Bach-Zelewski, as the representative of Heinrich Himmler; Max Montua, commander of Police Regiment Centre; Hermann Fegelein, commander of the SS Cavalry Brigade; and Gustav Lombard, commander of the 1st SS Cavalry Regiment. The commander of the 2nd SS Cavalry Regiment, Franz Magill, was not invited, perhaps because he was not viewed as extreme enough on the "Jewish question", as he only massacred Jewish males, and not women and children.

=== Lectures and sand-table sessions ===
Presentations covered the evaluation of Soviet "bandit" organisations and tactics, why it was necessary to kill political commissars immediately upon capture, and gaining intelligence from local collaborators. Bach-Zelewski's session was entitled "The Capture of Kommissars and Partisans in 'Scouring-Actions'", referring to the activities of the SS Cavalry Brigade in the Pripyat Marshes massacres. Nebe's talk focused on the role of the SD in the fight against "partisans" and "plunderers". He also covered the "Jewish question", with particular consideration to the anti-partisan movement. Company-grade officers gave short classes or led sand-table exercises on a variety of tactical situations that could be encountered in the field, such as securing a village.

=== Field exercises ===
The conference included three field exercises. On the first day, the participants observed an operation by Police Regiment Centre that involved surrounding a village and distribution of leaflets. On the second day, participants travelled to the village of Knyazhitsy (German: Knjaschitschi) in the vicinity of Mogilev. There, men of the Police Battalion 322 of Police Regiment Centre conducted a demonstration of how to surround and screen a village. According to the after-action report, "suspicious strangers" (Ortsfremde) or "partisans" could not be found. The screening of the population revealed 51 Jewish civilians, 32 of whom were shot by the police and SD troops.

At dawn on the last day of the conference, participants observed another operation conducted by police troops. The goal was to "practically experience" the combing of the town for suspects who were identified as "partisans, commissars, and communists". After the roundup, the participants observed the interrogations then rejoined their respective units.

== Conference summary and aftermath ==
A 16-page executive summary of the conference, under Schenckendorff's signature, was distributed to Wehrmacht troops and police units in the rear area. The document focused on tactics of security warfare, while also prescribing harsh measures, such as "the streets should be kept clear of 'wanderers'" who should be handed over to the Secret Field Police or sent to filtration camps for further screening. (Many sent to these camps were killed by the SS and SD troops.) The summary warned that the enemy was employing women, children and the elderly as agents.

The summary proclaimed that "the enemy must be completely annihilated", while specifying that the distinction between a "partisan" and a "suspicious person" was not always possible, thus giving a carte blanche to the troops for the most brutal approach possible. The document was sent to all company-level units in the army group's area of operations, including to units that did not send representatives to the conference. The conference marked a dramatic increase in atrocities by the Wehrmacht units against Jews and other civilians in the final three months of 1941.

The summary had an impact beyond the territory under the control of Army Group Centre Rear Area. The commander of the German army, Field Marshal Walther von Brauchitsch, issued "Guidelines for the Fighting of Partisans" in October 1941, one month after the conference. Underlining the importance of the event, the closing text of Schenckendorff's summary was reproduced verbatim:

The constant decision between life and death for partisans and suspicious persons is difficult even for the hardest soldier. It must be done. He acts correctly who fights ruthlessly and mercilessly with complete disregard for any personal surge of emotion.

== Assessment ==
In the opinion of historian Waitman Wade Beorn, the Mogilev Conference was a key event that, in the Army Group Center Rear Area, helped incorporate the Wehrmacht into the Nazi genocide as part of "the anti-partisan war and the Jew-Bolshevik-partisan construct". Since the conference, the Wehrmacht rear units were instructed to cooperate fully with the SD detachments beyond simply providing logistical support. The Wehrmacht units also assumed direct responsibility for the murder of Jews in the territory under Schenckendorff's command. Jewish civilians were added to an approved list of enemies that the army's rear units would then destroy on their own initiative and without the participation of the SS Police or SD.

Although the conference summary did not mention Jews, the field exercises demonstrated that the Wehrmacht was to target Jews in its anti-partisan actions. Beorn concludes that verbal instructions to this effect were, most likely, communicated during the sessions, given the speaker lineup, which included experienced mass murderers such as Bach-Zalewski, Nebe, Lombard, and Fegelein. The anti-Jewish policy had changed radically the month before, with the addition of women and children to the list of targets. This strained the limited resources of the SD and SS organisations. In addition, the German forces had to make room for Jews newly deported from elsewhere in occupied Europe, which was achieved by killing Soviet Jews already concentrated in ghettos. The size of territories under German control increased as well, which limited the activities of these units even further to major population centres.

The conference led to a further conflation of more legitimate anti-partisan warfare against irregular fighters with genocide by identifying civilians as enemy combatants. Euphemistic language helped couch the actions; Wehrmacht reports frequently referred to targets as "stranger to the village", "wanderer", "suspect civilian", "partisan helper", "civilian without identification", and "women soldiers". The exercises during the conference put the punitive operations into military context, by breaking down the actions into something that soldiers could relate to, such as surrounding a village, guarding and escorting the suspects, interrogations, etc.

In explaining the Wehrmacht's willingness to participate in the genocide, Beorn opines that the Wehrmacht's long history of harsh treatment of civilians, paranoia about a not-yet-existent partisan threat, institutional and individual racism, and its own criminal actions against Red Army commissars all predisposed the army towards accepting mass murder. This was done under the guise of anti-partisan warfare where Jews were targeted as Bolsheviks and thus partisan supporters. Consequently, the division between the Holocaust and the anti-partisan war still prevalent in historiography is a false one. Beorn concludes that "the Mogilev conference shows that these two were never separate, but intentionally connected in an effort to include the combat power of the Wehrmacht more efficiently in Hitler's genocidal projects in the east".
