= Witthöft =

Witthöft is a German surname. Notable people with the surname include:

- Carina Witthöft (born 1995), German tennis player
- Joachim Witthöft (1887–1966), German general
