= Franz von Roques =

German general (1877–1967)

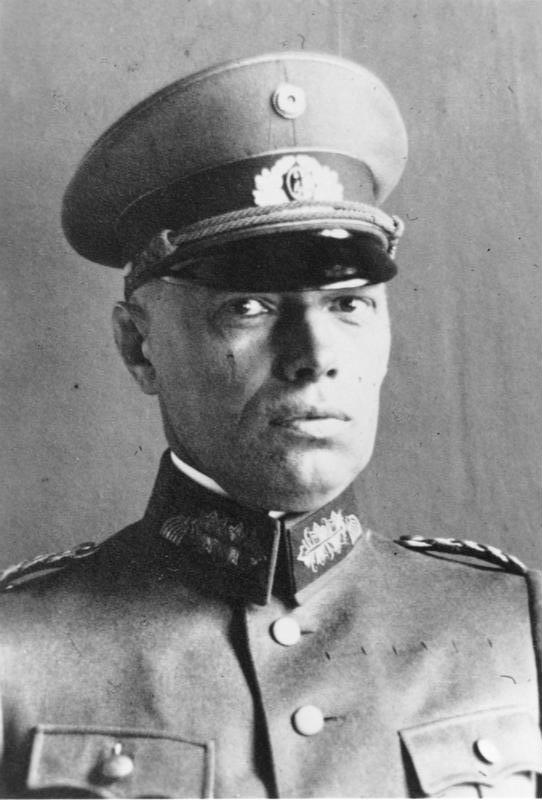
- Roques in 1931
- Born: 1 September 1877; Treysa, German Empire
- Died: 7 August 1967 (aged 89)
- Relatives: Karl von Roques (cousin)
- Military career
- Allegiance: German Empire; Weimar Republic; Nazi Germany
- Branch: German Army
- Rank: General der Infanterie
- Commands: Army Group North Rear Area
- Conflicts: World War II

Franz Hermann Ludwig Heinrich von Roques (1 September 1877 – 7 August 1967) was a German general during World War II. He was the commander of Army Group North Rear Area behind Army Group North from March 1941 to April 1943.

== Biography ==
Roques was the descendant of Huguenots who had fled to German territories from France. Adolf Hitler regarded him as a member of the "ultra-reactionaries" within the Wehrmacht, older officers who had a low opinion of Nazism. Roques was one of many retired officers who were reactivated upon the outbreak of World War II to command rearguard and occupation units; his early activities in this role were uneventful.

In March 1941, Roques was appointed commander of Army Group North Rear Area; he assumed the post in July 1941. Notably, his cousin Karl von Roques served as commander of Army Group Centre Rear Area. Roques was not enthusiastic about Adolf Hitler's concept of waging a racial war. In late June and early July 1941, Roques informed his superior Wilhelm Ritter von Leeb of the massacres of Jews by Einsatzgruppe A, Lithuanian auxiliaries and the men of the 16th Army outside of Kaunas. He expressed opposition to the mass shootings, stating that this was not the right way to solve the Jewish question. Leeb claimed he could not do anything about these incidents, and the two soldiers eventually agreed that it might be "more humane" to sterilise the Jewish men. Neither took any action to prevent further massacres. Historian Johannes Hürter argued that the exchange between Roques and Leeb showcased that the officers might've had weak moral concerns, but ultimately condoned the mass murder by excusing their inaction with claims of powerlessness. Conversely, the leadership of other Wehrmacht army groups did not even offer this kind of weak protest over the mass murders.

Roques occasionally criticized how the German security forces were behaving. He disparagingly described the SS killing squads as "headhunters" and called Joachim von Ribbentrop an "idiot". His chief of staff Arno Kriegsheim stated that killing Jewish civilians was "unworthy" of German soldiers. Kriegsheim was removed from his post and transferred to the Führerreserve for his comments. Roques was also slow in implementing some policies of the Holocaust: While ordering all Jews in his territories to wear the yellow badge, he put low priority on organizing ghettos and gave only vague orders to the security divisions under his command.

In the end, however, Roques ultimately followed the orders given to him and cooperated with those agencies which were most supportive of the Holocaust and other crimes. For instance, Roques allowed SS-Brigadeführer Franz Walter Stahlecker, head of Einsatzgruppe A, to act with impunity in all of Latvia. Major massacres of Jews also took place in other Army Group North areas such as Estonia, Luga, and Pskov. Historian Valdis O. Lumans stated that "–except for incidental jibes–von Roques stayed out of the matter, looked the other way". Like other Army Group Rear Areas, the territories under Roques' control became the sites of mass murder during the Holocaust and other crimes against humanity that targeted the civilian population. Rear Area commanders operated in parallel and in co-operation, with the Higher SS and Police Leaders, who were appointed by the head SS leader, Heinrich Himmler, for each of the army group's rear areas. In the words of the historian Michael Parrish, the army commanders "presided over an empire of terror and brutality".

After World War II, Franz von Roques was never persecuted for his role in the massacres committed under the Army Group North Rear Area.
