= 213th Security Division =

- 213. Sicherungs-Division
- Divisional insignia
- Active: 1941–1944
- Country: Nazi Germany
- Branch: Army (Wehrmacht)
- Type: Security division
- Size: Division
- Engagements: World War II

The 213th Security Division (213. Sicherungs-Division), initially known as the 213th Infantry Division (213. Infanterie-Division), was a rear-security division in the Wehrmacht of Nazi Germany. The unit was deployed in German-occupied areas of the Soviet Union, in the Army Group South Rear Area.

== Operational history ==
The 213th Infantry Division was formed on 26 August 1939 as part of the third Aufstellungswelle. It was raised in the 8th military district (Silesia) and initially consisted of the Artillery Regiment 213 as well as the Infantry Regiments 318, 354 and 406. Its recruits hailed from the Breslau area. The division's initial commander was Rene de l’Homme de Courbiere.

During the Invasion of Poland, the 213th Infantry Division served in the reserves of Army Group South (Gerd von Rundstedt). It did not play a significant role in the Poland campaign. After the campaign, the division served under XXXV Army Corps.

In June 1940, the 213th Infantry Division was moved to the 7th Army in the Upper Rhine area, but did not see action in the Battle of France. It was sent on vacation to its home military district in July 1940. It was not reactivated as an infantry division, and instead prepared to be reformed into the 213th, 286th and 403rd Security Divisions starting in March 1941.

The 213th Security Division was formed on 15 March 1941 in the Neuhammer area, prior the German invasion of the Soviet Union, Operation Barbarossa. Courbiere was replaced as the divisional commander by Alexander Goeschen on 18 August 1942. This would remain the division's only replacement of the commander, as Goeschen held command until the division's dissolution. The division operated in the occupied Ukraine and Southern Russia regions behind Army Group South's front lines.

The division's duties included security of communications and supply lines, economic exploitation and combatting irregular fighters (partisans) in the Wehrmacht's rear areas. Along with other security and police forces in the occupied territories, the division participated in war crimes against prisoners of war and the civilian population. The division was subordinated to Karl von Roques, commander of Army Group South Rear Area. Similar to 454th Security Division, it coordinated its actions with Friedrich Jeckeln, the Higher SS and Police Leader for Army Group South.

== Noteworthy individuals ==
- Rene de l’Homme de Courbiere, divisional commander starting 26 August 1939.
- Alexander Goeschen, divisional commander starting 18 August 1942.

== See also ==
- War crimes of the Wehrmacht
