= 454th Security Division =

- 454. Sicherungs-Division
- Active: 1941–1944
- Country: Nazi Germany
- Branch: Army (Wehrmacht)
- Type: Security division
- Size: Division
- Engagements: World War II

The 454th Security Division (454. Sicherungs-Division) was a rear-security division in the Wehrmacht of Nazi Germany. The unit was deployed in German-occupied areas of the Soviet Union, in the Army Group South Rear Area.

== Operational history ==
The division was formed in 1941, prior the German invasion of the Soviet Union, Operation Barbarossa. It operated in the occupied Ukraine and Southern Russia regions behind Army Group South's front lines. Its duties included security of communications and supply lines, economic exploitation and combatting irregular fighters (partisans) in Wehrmacht's rear areas.

Along with other security and police forces in the occupied territories, the division participated in war crimes against prisoners of war and civilian population. The division was subordinated to Karl von Roques, commander of Army Group South Rear Area. In early September 1941, he issued instructions to the division to coordinate its activities in "cleansing" operations with the forces under the command of Friedrich Jeckeln, the Higher SS and Police Leader for the region. Between 29 July and 16 September 1941, the division reported capturing just under 1,500 civilians and Red Army soldiers. Of these, 78 were Jews who were killed.

The division was also involved in the persecution and killing of partisans in Ukraine and surrounding areas from 1941 to the end of 1943. For this purpose, they were placed under the command of Friedrich Jeckeln from July to September 1941.

The unit was largely destroyed in the Brody Pocket in July 1944, and many of the division's soldiers, including the wounded commander Johannes Nedtwig, being taken into Soviet captivity. On August 5, 1944, the division was dissolved.

== Organization ==
- 57th Security Regiment (Sicherungs-Regiment 57) (until August 1942 known as Landesschützen-Regiment 57, at the time in Heeresgruppe B)
- 375th Security Regiment (Sicherungs-Regiment 375) (formerly Infanterie-Regiment 375 of the 221st Infantry Division), renamed in October 1942 to 375th Grenadier Regiment (Grenadier-Regiment 375) (disbanded in March 1943, with the remaining elements going to the 111th and 304th Infantry Divisions)
- 602nd Security Regiment (Sicherungs-Regiment 602) (from August 1942, previously part of the 213th Security Division)
- 3rd Battalion of the 221st Artillery Regiment (III./Artillerie-Regiment 221) (later renamed to Artillerie-Bataillon 454)
- 454th Eastern Cavalry Battalion (Ostreiter-Bataillon 454) (formerly Reiter-Abteilung 454, later Ostreiter-Regiment 454)
- 454th Eastern Pioneer Battalion (Ost-Pionier-Bataillon 454)
- 829th Signals Battalion (Nachrichten-Abteilung 829)
- 454th Divisional Services (Divisions-Einheiten 454)
