= Johann Pflugbeil =

German Nazi general (1882–1951)

- Born: 24 August 1882; German Empire
- Died: 21 October 1951 (aged 69); Stuttgart, Württemberg-Baden, West Germany
- Relatives: Kurt Pflugbeil (brother)
- Military career
- Allegiance: Nazi Germany
- Branch: Army (Wehrmacht)
- Rank: Generalleutnant
- Commands: 221st Security Division
- Conflicts: Operation Barbarossa
- Awards: Knight's Cross of the Iron Cross

Johann Pflugbeil (24 August 1882 – 21 October 1951) was a German general during World War II. During 1941 and 1942, he commanded the 221st Security Division in the Army Group Centre Rear Area. Under Pflugbeil's command, the division took part in Nazi security warfare and was responsible for numerous war crimes and crimes against humanity.

== World War II ==
On June 27, 1941, the 221st Security Division held the Polish city of Białystok, which had been in the Soviet zone of occupation. That day, the 309th Police battalion started a pogrom on the Jewish community: Jews were arrested, beaten, beards were cut, and people were shot. The Jewish community chiefs went to see general Pflugbeil, and asked him to stop that pogrom. They were in his office, on their knees to implore him. A policeman of the 309th Police Battalion urinated on them; the general offered his back, to see elsewhere. After that "meeting", the pogrom became slaughter and massacre: the Jews on the market place were shot in front on a wall, until the night; the synagogue, where 700 Jews were piled up, was set on fire with petrol and grenades. The Jews who tried to escape were shot. On June 28, general Pflugbeil asked Major Weis (309th Police battalion) the cause of the fire. Weis made a false report on the causes.

In March 1942, the division under Pflugbeil command embarked on large scale Nazi security warfare in the Yelnya-Dorogobuzh area east of Smolensk. The so-called anti-partisan operations in "bandit-infested" areas amounted to destruction of villages, seizure of livestock, deporting of able-bodied population for slave labour to Germany and murder of those of non-working age. The tactics included shelling villages not under German control with heavy weapons, resulting in mass civilian casualties. Pflugbeil directed his troops that the "goal of the operation is not to drive the enemy back, but to exterminate him". During the operation, the unit recorded 278 German troops killed, while 806 enemies were reported killed in action and 120 prisoners were handed over to Wehrmacht's Secret Field Police for execution. Only 200 weapons (rifles, machine-guns and pistols) were seized.

== Awards ==
- Knight's Cross of the Iron Cross on 12 August 1944 as Generalleutnant and Kommandant von Milau

Military offices
Preceded by None	Commander of 221st Infantry Division; 26 August 1939 - 15 March 1941	Succeeded by Renamed 221. Sicherungs-Division
Preceded by Previously 221. Infanterie-Division	Commander of 221st Security Division; 15 March 1941 - 5 July 1942	Succeeded by Generalleutnant Hubert Lendle
