= Army Group North Rear Area =

- Rückwärtiges Heeresgebiet Nord
- Active: 1941-44
- Country: Nazi Germany
- Branch: Army (Wehrmacht)
- Part of: Army Group North and Army High Command
- Engagements: World War II

Commanders
- Notable commanders: Franz von Roques; Kuno-Hans von Both

Army Group North Rear Area (Rückwärtiges Heeresgebiet Nord) was one of the three Army Group Rear Area Commands, established during the 1941 German invasion of the Soviet Union. Initially commanded by General Franz von Roques, it was an area of military jurisdiction behind Wehrmacht's Army Group North.

The Group North Rear Area's outward function was to provide security behind the fighting troops. It was also a site of mass murder during The Holocaust and other crimes against humanity targeting the civilian population. In the words of historian Michael Parrish, the army commander "presided over an empire of terror and brutality".

== Organisation ==
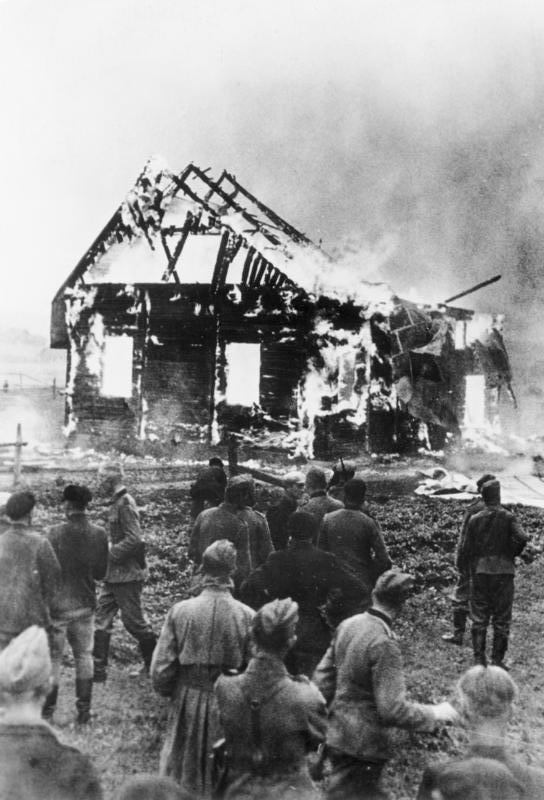
German soldiers and locals watch a Lithuanian synagogue burn, 9 July 1941

The Army Group North Rear Area initially encompassed Lithuania, Latvia, Estonia and northwestern Russia. Lithuania and Latvia were transferred to civilian administration in 1941. Estonia, being close to besieged Leningrad, operated under dual civilian-military control, Army Group North Rear Area retaining oversight of the territory until the German forces were expelled from Estonia in 1944.

The terrytory's commander, General Franz von Roques, was responsible for the rear area security. Its headquarters was subordinated to Army Group North, while also reporting to the Wehrmacht's Quartermaster General Eduard Wagner, who had the overall responsibility for rear area security. The tasks also included transfer of prisoners of war to the rear.

Roques controlled three Security Divisions (207th, 281st, and 285th) and oversaw the units of Secret Field Police of the Wehrmacht. He operated in parallel, and in cooperation, with Hans-Adolf Prützmann and, since November 1941, with Friedrich Jeckeln, the Higher SS and Police Leaders appointed by the head of the SS, Heinrich Himmler.

== Security warfare and crimes against humanity ==
The area commanders' duties included security of communications and supply lines, economic exploitation and combatting guerillas (partisans) in Wehrmacht's rear areas, which were the primary tasks of the security divisions. In addition, security and police formations of the SS and the SD (SS Security Service) operated in the areas, being subordinated to the respective Higher SS and Police Leaders. These units included multiple Einsatzgruppen death squad detachments, Police Regiment North and additional Order Police battalions. These units perpetrated mass murder during The Holocaust and other crimes against humanity. While under military jurisdiction, the area was the site of the Kaunas pogrom, instigated by the SD. During the same period, mass murder of POWs, Jews and other civilians took place at the 9th Fort.

The security formations, often in coordination with or under the leadership of the Wehrmacht, conducted security warfare targeting civilian population. The so-called anti-partisan operations in "bandit-infested" areas amounted to destruction of villages, seizure of livestock, deporting of able-bodied population for slave labour to Germany and murder of those of non-working age.
