= 285th Division =

285th Division may refer to:

- 285th Security Division, Wehrmacht, Germany
- 285th Rifle Division, Soviet Union

== See also ==
- List of military divisions by number
