= Erich Friderici =

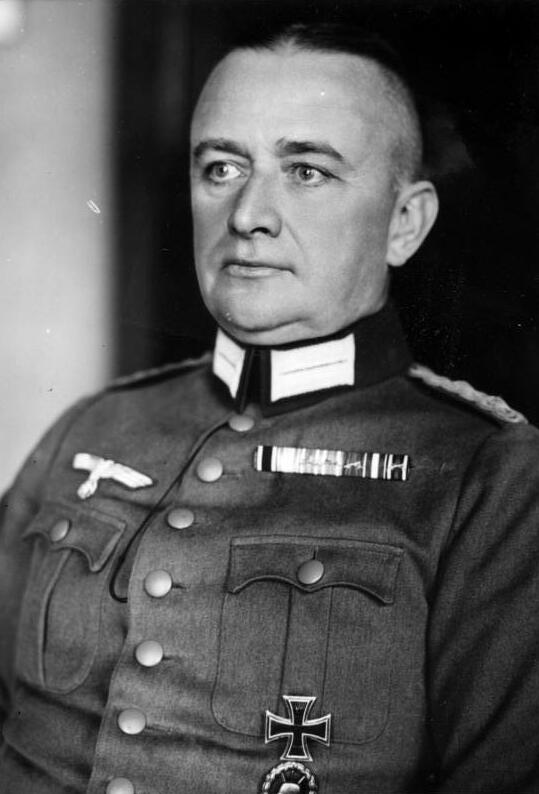
- Friderici in 1939
- Born: 21 December 1885
- Died: 19 September 1964 (aged 78)
- Military career
- Allegiance: German Empire; Weimar Republic; Nazi Germany
- Branch: Army (Wehrmacht)
- Rank: Genederl der Infanterie
- Commands: Army Group South Rear Area
- Conflicts: World War II

Erich Friderici (21 December 1885 – 19 September 1967) was a German general during World War II. He was the commander of Army Group South Rear Area behind Army Group South from 27 October 1941 to 9 January 1942, while the original commander, Karl von Roques, was on medical leave.

Like other Army Group Rear Areas, the territories under Friderici's control were the sites of mass murder during the Holocaust and other crimes against humanity targeting the civilian population. Rear Area commanders operated in parallel, and in cooperation, with the Higher SS and Police Leaders appointed by the head of the SS, Heinrich Himmler, for each of the army group's rear areas. In the words of historian Michael Parrish, these army commanders "presided over an empire of terror and brutality".

- Förster, Jürgen (1998). "Securing 'Living-Space'". In Boog, Horst; Förster, Jürgen; Hoffmann, Joachim; Klink, Ernst; Müller, Rolf-Dieter; Ueberschär, Gerd R. (eds.). The Attack on the Soviet Union. Vol. IV. Translated by McMurry, Dean S.; Osers, Ewald; Willmot, Louise. Military History Research Office (Germany). Oxford: Clarendon Press. pp. 1189–1244. ISBN 0-19-822886-4.
- Megargee, Geoffrey P. (2007). War of Annihilation: Combat and Genocide on the Eastern Front, 1941. Rowman & Littlefield. ISBN 978-0-7425-4482-6.
- Parrish, Michael (1996). The Lesser Terror: Soviet State Security, 1939–1953. Praeger Press. ISBN 978-0-275-95113-9.

Military offices
Preceded by None	Military commander Protectorate of Bohemia and Moravia; 1 April 1939 – 27 October 1941	Succeeded by General der Infanterie Rudolf Toussaint
