= Army Group South Rear Area =

- Rückwärtiges Heeresgebiet Süd
- Active: 1941-43
- Country: Nazi Germany
- Branch: Army (Wehrmacht)
- Part of: Army Group South and Army High Command
- Engagements: World War II

Commanders
- Notable commanders: Karl von Roques; Erich Friderici; Joachim Witthöft; Friedrich Mieth

Army Group South Rear Area (Rückwärtiges Heeresgebiet Süd) was one of the three Army Group Rear Area Commands, established during the 1941 German invasion of the Soviet Union. Commanded by General Karl von Roques, it was an area of military jurisdiction behind Wehrmacht's Army Group South.

The Group South Rear Area's outward function was to provide security behind the fighting troops. It was also a site of mass murder during The Holocaust and other crimes against humanity targeting the civilian population. In the words of historian Michael Parrish, the army commander "presided over an empire of terror and brutality".

== Organisation ==
The commander of the Army Group South Rear Area, General Karl von Roques, was responsible for the rear area security. Its headquarters was subordinated to Army Group South, while also reporting to the Wehrmacht's Quartermaster General Eduard Wagner, who had the overall responsibility for rear area security.

Roques controlled three Security Divisions (213th, 444th, and 454th) and oversaw the units of Secret Field Police of the Wehrmacht. He operated in parallel, and in cooperation, with Friedrich Jeckeln, the Higher SS and Police Leaders appointed by the head of the SS, Heinrich Himmler.

== Security warfare and crimes against humanity ==
The area commanders' duties included security of communications and supply lines, economic exploitation and combatting guerillas (partisans) in Wehrmacht's rear areas, which were the primary tasks of the security divisions. In addition, security and police formations of the SS and the SD (SS Security Service) operated in the areas, being subordinated to the respective Higher SS and Police Leaders. These units included multiple Einsatzgruppen death squad detachments, Police Regiment South and additional Order Police battalions. These units perpetrated mass murder during The Holocaust and other crimes against humanity. While under military jurisdiction, the area was the site of the massacres at Babi Yar and Kamianets-Podilskyi.

The security formations, often in coordination with or under the leadership of the Wehrmacht, conducted security warfare targeting the civilian population. The so-called anti-partisan operations in "bandit-infested" areas amounted to destruction of villages, seizure of livestock, deporting of able-bodied population for slave labour to Germany and murder of those of non-working age.

== Commanders ==
- Karl von Roques
- Erich Friderici
- Joachim Witthöft (as Army Group B Rear Area)
- Friedrich Mieth (as Army Group Don Rear Area)
