= 285th Security Division =

- 285. Sicherungs-Division
- Active: 1941–1944
- Country: Nazi Germany
- Branch: Army (Wehrmacht)
- Type: Security division
- Size: Division
- Engagements: World War II

The 285th Security Division (285. Sicherungs-Division) was a rear-security division in the Wehrmacht of Nazi Germany. The unit was deployed in German-occupied areas of the Soviet Union, in the Army Group North Rear Area.

== Operational history ==
The division was formed in 1941, prior the German invasion of the Soviet Union, Operation Barbarossa. It operated in the occupied Baltic States and Northern Russia behind Army Group North's front lines. Its duties included security of communications and supply lines, economic exploitation and combatting irregular fighters (partisans) in Wehrmacht's rear areas.

The division was subordinated to Franz von Roques, commander of Army Group North Rear Area. Along with other security and police forces in the occupied territories, the division participated in war crimes against prisoners of war and civilian population. For the period from 22 June to 1 December 1941, the division reported 1,500 enemies "killed in battle" or shot as "partisans", for the loss of seven dead and eleven wounded.

== See also ==
- War crimes of the Wehrmacht
