= 325th Security Division =

325. Sicherungs-Division
- Active: August 1942 – August 1944
- Country: Nazi Germany
- Branch: Army
- Type: Infantry
- Role: Garrison Regiment
- Size: Division
- Garrison/HQ: Paris
- Engagements: Liberation of Paris

Commanders
- Notable commanders: Hans von Boineburg-Lengsfeld

The 325th Security Division (German: 325. Sicherungs-Division) was a German military formation that operated in German-occupied France during World War II.

== Operational history ==
It was established in August 1942 under the command of Generalmajor Walter Brehmer, who was succeeded in May 1943 by Lieutenant General Hans Freiherr von Boineburg-Lengsfeld. The 325th Security Division was responsible for the defense of Paris and its surrounding area.

Division commander von Boineburg-Lengsfeld—who was simultaneously Commandant of Greater Paris—supported the military governor of France, Carl-Heinrich von Stülpnagel, in the 20 July plot. On 20 July 1944, Stülpnagel was informed by Stauffenberg's cousin, who had received a telephone call from Stauffenberg, that Hitler was dead and that the coup was in progress. Stülpnagel then ordered the arrest of all 1,200 SS personnel in the city. The 325th's Security Regiment 1 carried out the task and imprisoned them in Fresnes Prison and Fort de l'Est. Higher SS and Police Leader in France Carl Oberg and other senior SS and Gestapo officers were detained in the Hotel Continental, pending their planned execution. The coup attempt began to unravel that night after it was known that Hitler was in fact alive, and the SS men were ordered released.

The 325th Security Division surrendered to Allied forces during the Liberation of Paris after sustaining around 3,200 men in losses, and was formally disbanded shortly thereafter. It was the only Security Division to serve on the European Western Front.

== Organisation ==
The division included the following units.

- 1st Security Regiment
- 5th Security Regiment
- 6th Security Regiment
- 190th Security Regiment
- 325th Fusiliers Company
- 325th Engineer Company
- 325th Artillery Regiment
- 325th Tank Destroyer Company
- 325th Signal Company
- 325th Divisional Supply Group
