= Max von Schenckendorff =

German general (1875–1943)

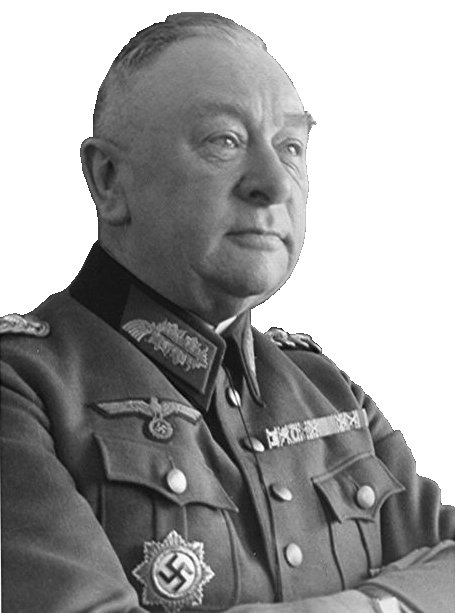
- Born: 24 February 1875; Prenzlau, Province of Brandenburg, Kingdom of Prussia, German Empire
- Died: 6 July 1943 (aged 68); Krummhübel, Lower Silesia, Prussia, Nazi Germany
- Military career
- Allegiance: German Empire; Weimar Republic; Nazi Germany
- Branch: German Army
- Rank: General of the Infantry
- Commands: Army Group Centre Rear Area
- Conflicts: World War II

Max von Schenckendorff (24 February 1875 – 6 July 1943) was a German military general in the Wehrmacht of Nazi Germany during World War II. He was the commander of Army Group Centre Rear Area, the area of military jurisdiction in the rear of Army Group Centre, from March 1941 until his death in 1943. He organized the Mogilev conference, in which Wehrmacht and SS officers discussed "bandit fighting" tactics, meaning the mass murder of Jews and other real or perceived enemies. The conference resulted in an intensification of the genocide that was already taking place in Army Group Centre Rear Area. Max von Schenckendorff died of a heart attack on 6 July 1943, while on leave in Krummhübel in the Giant Mountains.

== Family ==
Max Heinrich Moritz Albert von Schenckendorff was born February 24, 1875, in Prenzlau, Brandenburg. He came from the old noble family of Schenkendorff, which was first documented in the 13th century. The family's ancestral seat was in Schenkendorf in Lower Lusatia, Brandenburg. The region around the village, where the family owned extensive lands, was called Schenckenländchen (Schencken Country). Today, the village is called Sękowice and belongs to the rural municipality of Gubin on the Neisse River in Poland.

The male members of the Schenckendorff family were mostly landowners, civil servants, and officers. His father, Albert, was an officer in the 64th Brandenburg Infantry Regiment "General Field Marshal Prince Friedrich Karl of Prussia", ultimately reaching the rank of colonel and commander.

Max, the eldest of three brothers, was named after his ancestor Max von Schenkendorf (1783–1817), a lyric poet who was active as a writer of patriotic poems and songs during the Napoleonic Wars of Liberation. His two brothers also became officers. His brother Günther, a captain and commander of the III Battalion of the 64th Infantry Regiment, fell in the Battle of Verdun at Fort Douaumont. His brother Heinrich died in 1941 as a lieutenant general and commander of the military replacement inspectorate in Liegnitz.

In 1904, he married Lena Sophie von Langendorf from Schleswig-Holstein. They had a son and four daughters.

== Service in World War I ==
Max von Schenckendorff was educated in the Prussian Cadet Corps and prepared for an officer's career. On 17 March 1894, he joined the 47th Infantry Regiment "King Ludwig III of Bavaria" (2nd Lower Silesian) in Posen as a lieutenant. He rose through the ranks over the next 17 years until December 1911, when he became, like his father before him, commander of the 10th company in the 64th Infantry Regiment in Angermünde in Brandenburg.

On 2 August 1914, the day after the commencement of formal hostilities, Schenkendorff was appointed company commander of the 64th Infantry Regiment. He participated in heavy fighting in northern France and was temporarily assigned as a battalion commander. In October, he was awarded the Iron Cross First Class.

In December 1914, his unit was withdrawn from the front for the first time. Schenckendorff contracted severe migraines and was hospitalized. He subsequently became commander of a recruit depot responsible for training replacements for the III Army Corps. There, beginning in March 1915, he developed new training methods, attracting the attention of his superiors. In April, he was given responsibility for the entire recruit training of the III Army Corps. On 18 April 1915, he was promoted to major. Throughout the rest of the war Schenckendorff alternated between service in the field in Serbia, at the Battle of Verdun, and in Romania, Alsace, and Northern France, on the one hand, and training responsibilities on the other, for which he was singled out for praise by Erich Ludendorff and Paul von Hindenburg.

Schenckendorff witnessed the collapse of the German Empire and the armistice while on duty in Berlin finishing a training film on tank warfare. He believed, like many of his fellow officers, in the so-called stab-in-the-back myth, according to which the Army, undefeated in the field, had been "stabbed in the back" by "unpatriotic" civilians from the homeland.

Schenckendorff was awarded the Iron Cross 2nd and 1st Class, the Knight's Cross of the Royal House Order of Hohenzollern with Swords, and the Austrian Military Merit Cross 3rd Class with War Decoration. He was also appointed a Knight of Justice of the Order of St. John.

== Between the wars ==
After hostilities ended Schenckendorff was given leave to return to Angermünde. In mid-January 1919, he received command of the II Battalion of Infantry Regiment No. 64, the home regiment of the noble Schenckendorff family. It was disbanded that April. After that Schenckendorff served in a variety of positions, while publishing a comprehensive guide to military training in 1928. He retired from active service on February 28, 1930, after which he busied himself with veterans affairs and youth fitness. He and his wife joined the Nazi Party in 1933.

== Activities during World War II ==
=== Early efforts to eliminate civilian and partisan resistance ===
Schenckendorff returned to active duty with the outbreak of the Second World War in August 1939, originally as commander of Border Guard Command 13 in Glogau, Upper Silesia. In March 1941, just months before the Nazi invasion of the USSR, Schenckendorff was appointed commander of Rear Area 102, Army Group Center.

The troops under Schenckendorff's command were occupied in the first weeks of the invasion with capturing straggling Soviet soldiers, which Schenckendorff hoped to accomplish through the systematic search of villages after searches of forests proved ineffective. In these villages, residents were to be interrogated to identify those not living there and to deal with them according to "generally issued orders". His Corps Order No. 39 directed the Wehrmacht to take on the job of policing the newly conquered territory by appointing mayors for these villages, then holding them accountable with their lives for any attacks in or near these villages. This Order marked the first radicalization of the Wehrmacht's approach to dealing with popular resistance in the occupied territory.

As the war progressed the German forces faced increased resistance from partisan units. Schenckendorff responded by dispersing his forces into platoons that would encircle villages at dawn, then interrogate their residents. By September Schenckendorff ordered the troops under his command "to act more ruthlessly than before” and to use “the most severe means”.

=== The Mogilev conference ===
Later that month Schenckendorff led the Wehrmacht's first anti-partisan training course in Mogilev. The course brought together sixty-one officers from the OKH (Army High Command), Army Group, the SS and the Sicherheitsdienst (Security Service; SD), field commands, economic inspectorates, and police, as well as regimental and battalion officers from von Schenckendorff's unit. These officers were intended to serve as multipliers, disseminating the methods against not only partisans in the rear areas of Army Center, but other "enemies of the Reich".

Schenckendorff's opening speech does not suggest that he was a fanatical anti-Semite or that he totally believed in the links between the Jews and the partisans that was a fundamental tenet of both Nazi and Wehrmacht policy. (Note: While Schenckendorff may not have singled out Jews for extermination, other speakers at the conference did. SD General Arthur Nebe, the local commander of Einsatzgruppe B, one of the four mobile death squads of the SS and later the first proponent of the use of poison gas to murder Jews, spoke on "the Jewish question" and its connection to the suppression of resistance movements in occupied territories for half an hour on the second day.) Instead he stressed the threat posed by Bolsheviks and approached the elimination of partisans as a military operation.

Schenckendorff's opening speech does not suggest that he was a fanatical anti-Semite or that he totally believed in the links between the Jews and the partisans that was a fundamental tenet of both Nazi and Wehrmacht policy. (Note: While Schenckendorff may not have singled out Jews for extermination, other speakers at the conference did. SD General Arthur Nebe, the local commander of Einsatzgruppe B, one of the four mobile death squads of the SS and later the first proponent of the use of poison gas to murder Jews, spoke on "the Jewish question" and its connection to the suppression of resistance movements in occupied territories for half an hour on the second day.) Instead he stressed the threat posed by Bolsheviks and approached the elimination of partisans as a military operation.

The enemy must be completely annihilated. The constant decision-making over the life and death of captured partisans or suspects is difficult even for the toughest soldier. Action must be taken. The right course of action is to act ruthlessly and mercilessly, completely disregarding any personal feelings.

This policy of "complete annihilation" of partisans and civilians suspected of attacking German troops had been made part of official Wehrmacht policy, announced in the Barbarossa decree signed by OKW chief Wilhelm Keitel on 13 May 1941, several weeks before Germany launched its attack on the USSR. There was a dramatic increase in atrocities against Jews and other civilians in the last three months of 1941.

=== Schenckendorff's tactics ===
The manual that Schenckendorff circulated at this conference noted the difficulty of tracking small, flexible groups of partisans and focused instead on isolating them from the civilian population on which they depended for support. He highlighted three key points:

- Finding and killing partisan supporters within the population.
- Gaining the trust of the population.
- Engaging the participation of the population in the fight against the partisans.

In order to prevent partisans from moving around using public roads Scheckendorff barred the movement of the local population, including women and young people, handing those who violated the ban over to the SD, the GFP (General Police Force), or prisoner-of-war camps. He also called for the removal of non-residents in order to eliminate suspected partisans and their supporters.

Schenkendorff's previous efforts to encircle partisan groups had largely failed because the partisans had slipped through the loose security lines in the forests. Schenkendorff now organized offensives intended to drive the enemy toward German-held lines where they would be annihilated. While Schenkendorff spoke of gaining the trust of the population and engaging them in the fight against the partisans, he resorted to terror tactics directed at civilians: beatings of local villagers during their interrogations, and murdering an arbitrary number of people response to acts of sabotage from nearby villages. Later that year, when the Wehrmacht adopted Corps Order No. 75, a formal policy of burning villages that supported partisans or merely sympathized with them, he implemented that policy as well.

The Commander-in-Chief of the Army, Generalfeldmarschall Walther von Brauchitsch, endorsed Schenkendorff's manual on 25 October 1941 as a "guideline for combating partisans" for the army. With this, Schenkendorff established himself as a "partisan expert" until his death. Later that year he was awarded the German Cross in Gold for his actions against partisans.

His plans to eradicate the partisans that year were aborted, however, by the failure of Operation Typhoon, the German attack on Moscow, which required the transfer of troops to the front to resist the subsequent Soviet counterattack in early December 1941. As winter made large-scale operations more difficult, the partisans were able to reorganize. Schenckendorff, whose health was failing, was sent home on leave over the New Year period.

=== Commander of the Rear Area of Army Group Center, 1942–1943 ===
In the spring of 1942, the partisans began a concentrated effort to destabilize the German occupation administration and attack supply lines, killing collaborating residents and their families, looting businesses, and attacking roads, railway lines, and bridges. While the partisans mostly refrained from direct attacks on German soldiers, the Wehrmacht was unable to maintain control over much of the rear area, as more and more troops and other security forces now had to be deployed to secure the railway lines.

At the same time the Red Army was advancing. In January/February 1942, near Toropets, on the northern flank of Army Group Center, a defensive line of the 403rd Security Division was breached during a Red Army attack, virtually destroying its 85th Infantry Regiment. Soviet units that had broken through joined forces with partisans and captured or occupied various towns and areas east of Smolensk. This threatened Smolensk, one of the most important strongholds of the German army, with its numerous headquarters and supply bases. Meanwhile the partisans in the area of Army Group Center consolidated into larger units, which also possessed artillery.

On 1 March 1942, Schenckendorff was assigned 18 security battalions and the 707th Infantry Division in order to destroy the partisans along the railway lines and roads and in the Bryansk area to the north of Smolensk. Schenckendorff immediately called for an increase in the number and quality of security units, noting that half of the troops had been transferred to the front, and demanded that fighting the partisans should be given the same priority as fighting at the front. He pointed out that the transfer of so many troops to the front in the past few months had allowed the partisans to seize the initiative.

His proposals met with approval and a pilot project, Operation Bamberg, was launched west of Babruysk. The plan was to confiscate even the last cow and all the seed in areas that could not be occupied in order to deprive the partisans of their food supply and simultaneously supply the Wehrmacht through looting; in addition to executing partisans and their supporters, all non-residents were also to be shot.

At the conclusion of the operation Generalmajor Gustav von Bechtolsheim, the commander of the 707th Infantry Division, which had murdered more than 10,000 civilians in Belarus the preceding year, reported the execution of 3,423 partisans and their helpers against the loss of seven dead and eight wounded German soldiers. Schenckendorff's staff could not help but note the discrepancy between the reported partisan deaths and their own losses, which they attributed to the indiscriminate shooting of civilians with only loose association with the partisans, rather than engagement with thee partisans themselves. By the end of April 1942, Schenckendorff had to retract his initial report to the OKH of a successful operation.

Subsequent operations east of Smolensk were only partially executed while those near Bryansk were not carried out. Even where the Army proceeded with planned operations the partisans simply evaded the larger German units, while the civilian population suffered terror. Schenckendorff received only a portion of the troops he had been promised and some of his troops were even withdrawn; those who were provided were poorly supplied, sometimes lacking rifles. The partisans became increasingly well-organized with time and carried out more and more acts of sabotage, while Schenckendorff was left with only the defensive task of securing 1,700 km of railway and 1,100 km of road, without sufficient troops for offensive operations or to conduct routine checks of areas away from the transport routes.

Schenckendorff once again called for a change in the brutal occupation policies, while simultaneously issuing terror orders to the troops. In May, 1942 Schenckendorff reported that his entire army area was now affected by partisan attacks. Schenckendorff ordered the removal of cover along the railway lines and proceeded to cut wide swathes through the forests along the tracks and destroy any houses in the area, while building watchtowers and other defensive structures.

Other forces began to take a more active role in combatting partisans, with varying results. In Operation Hannover, beginning on 4 June 1942, the OKH's command department destroyed the partisan units and the Soviet paratroopers supporting them near the town of Vyazma. That same month, an SS special unit under the command of Oskar Dirlewanger and police units carried out an anti-partisan operation in the area between Babruysk and Mogilev in which over 2,000 people were murdered in and around the village of Borki on a single day. Schenckendorff complained about this massacre to Erich von dem Bach-Zelewski, the SS and Police Leader (HSSPF) for Belarus who had provided the initial impetus for the building of Auschwitz concentration camp and overseen the murder of tens of thousands of Jews in Belarus and the Baltic states the year before.

On 20 June 1942, the SS's Economic Inspectorate stopped supplying food to the security divisions, as they were supposed to obtain supplies from the partisan territories. Schenckendorff then made the confiscation of food supplies a primary objective of anti-partisan operations. Several large-scale operations took place in the summer of 1942, involving a mix of Wehrmacht, SS, and police units. Partisans units were destroyed only in isolated cases; however, looting and destruction by the Wehrmacht was widespread.

On 16 June and 3 August 1942, Schenckendorff unsuccessfully ordered a halt to the burning of houses and the shooting of women and children. This led to the first heated argument with Bach-Zelewski, who disputed that Schenckendorff could enforce this order in the case of SS units. Bach-Zelewski, with Himmler's help, managed to push through his position that the SS itself should decide on the measures to be taken. Bach-Zelewski later falsified these facts in his diary, claiming that he had agreed with Schenckendorff's opinion. Schenckendorff's orders to spare the civilian population were ignored in all subsequent anti-partisan operations.

On 14 July 1942, in his monthly report for June, Schenckendorff noted that "Stalin's order to create intolerable conditions for the enemy in the rear area of the German army is not far from being implemented." In Corps Order No. 110, Schenckendorff declared a 100-meter-wide strip along railway lines a no-man's land with orders to fire. The first 50 meters were to be cleared of trees and mined. He had to rescind this order because it resulted in casualties among railway workers and army signal disruption units. The requested expansion of defensive fortifications also stalled. When further troops had to be reassigned to other operations, he denied further responsibility for the situation on 24 July 1942, and threatened to resign.

Adolf Hitler decided that July that anti-partisan warfare was a police matter. Heinrich Himmler intended to assume responsibility for anti-partisan operations throughout the entire German occupation zone. With Directive No. 46 of August 18, 1942, responsibility within the Army area was definitively transferred to the OKH, specifically to Colonel Adolf Heusinger. In this directive, Hitler also demanded the annihilation of the partisans by winter. Hitler's directive adopted passages verbatim from Schenckendorff's treatise on partisans, in which he acknowledged for the first time that a minimum standard of living had to be guaranteed for the population. Field replacement units (training units) of approximately 50,000 men were to be transferred to the operational area in the occupied hinterland of the Eastern Front.

After the Slavnoye railway station was attacked by partisans on the evening of 26 August 1942, closing the main railway line from Minsk to Smolensk was closed for 30 hours, Hitler demanded the most severe reprisals. Schenckendorff approved the proposal of the 286th Security Division to publicly execute 100 men and women. According to eyewitness accounts, small children were among those shot. On 2 August 1942, Schenckendorff issued an order that under no circumstances should children under the age of ten be killed and that deserters should be treated well. Like all of Schenckendorff's other orders to spare people, this order also went unheeded.

On 4 September 1942, Schenckendorff went on leave. Since transport capacity had by then dropped to only two-thirds of its target, and in the Smolensk area by half, Generalfeldmarschall Günther von Kluge issued an order on 5 September 1942 to deploy all security battalions to railway protection, effectively abandoning its rear area, except for the railway lines. On 22 September 1942, Schenckendorff's war diary noted that the pro-German population in the evacuated rear area had been murdered and that the bombings of railway lines had not abated.

On 5 October 1942, Schenckendorff returned after almost four weeks of leave. Instead of trained combat troops, he received only two field training divisions in his own army area. There were also insufficient troops available for railway security. For a short time, even villagers, including women and children, were forcibly deployed for railway security, but they proved to be more of a burden than a substitute for trained soldiers. Bach-Zelewski had now also been appointed by Himmler as "Plenipotentiary for Anti-Partisan Operations" in the General Commissariat of White Ruthenia (Belarus). With Schenckendorff's approval, he extended his jurisdiction into the Berück area. Thus, Bach-Zelewski and Himmler, bypassing the OKH, gained increased influence in the Army's operational area and in anti-partisan operations.

Whatever nominal authority Schenckendorff still had, due in part to his continued reputation as an expert in anti-partisan warfare, was eroded further over the next several months as Himmler, Göring and Bach-Zelewski adopted even more extreme forms of retaliation in cases of sabotage and ignored Schenckendorff's efforts to impose some limits on the killing of children and the looting of villages, even as he approved mass executions of villagers and burning of villages in Operation Cottbus. At the end of June 1943, Schenckendorff went on a leave of absence from which he never returned.

=== Treatment of Jews and Russians in the Rear Area of Army Group Center ===
Schenckendorff did not repeat anti-Semitic rhetoric in his or the army area orders. He also forbade his subordinates to take part in "special measures or shootings" Schenckendorff was nevertheless responsible for ensuring that the administration he commanded created the essential conditions for the murder of Jews in his area of command. Even before the attack on the Soviet Union, Schenckendorff engaged in discussions with Bach-Zelewski on 7 July 1941 that likely also concerned the treatment of Jews. Schenckendorff also established close cooperation with Arthur Nebe, the commander of Einsatzgruppe B. Nebe noted that the Einsatzgruppe went to its designated locations according to Schenckendorff's instructions.

Schenckendorff's first three administrative orders concerned the exclusion of Jews. On 7 July 1941, Schenckendorff issued Administrative Order No. 1, requiring Jews from the age of ten to identify themselves with a yellow Star of David. Furthermore, greetings to Jews were prohibited, and ritual slaughter was forbidden. Administrative Order No. 2 of 13 July 1941 prohibited Jews from leaving their place of residence and led to their ghettoization. Initially, there were no fences or walls around the ghettos. (Note: It was not until August 19, 1941, that the OKH issued the order to herd the Jews into ghettos, designated as fenced-off Jewish quarters. In communities with up to 10,000 inhabitants, 12 Jewish councils were to be elected; in larger communities, 24. The Jewish councils were to implement the German orders and were liable for their actions with their lives.) Administrative Order No. 3 made it compulsory for Jews to repair war damage.

On 8 July, Schenckendorff and some of his staff attended a commanders' meeting in Białystok, held on the occasion of a visit by Himmler and Kurt Daluege, Chief of the Ordnungspolizei (Order Police; Orpo). During this meeting, Himmler complained that too few Jews had been rounded up. The following day, thousands of Jews were shot outside the city of Białystok. There is no evidence that either Schenckendorff or any other military personnel offered any resistance or protest during this shooting or any of the mass murders that followed. (Note: Immediately following Himmler's complaint, Police Battalion 307 shot 4,435 Jews near Brest from 12 July 1941, until dawn the next day. A battalion of the 162nd Infantry Division, subordinate to Schenckendorff, provided transport assistance with its trucks. Schenckendorff expressed his displeasure with this assistance and demanded an explanation. Later, his staff reported that railway workers had allegedly been fired upon, and the massacre was downplayed as a "special operation".) The Einsatzgruppen and police units were deployed in all of the general "cleansing operations" ordered by Schenckendorff that targeted Jews.

== Notes ==
=== Bibliography ===
- Beorn, Waitman Wade (2014). Marching into Darkness: The Wehrmacht and the Holocaust in Belarus. Cambridge, MA: Harvard University Press. ISBN 978-0-674-72550-8.
- Blood, Phillip W. (2006). Hitler's Bandit Hunters: The SS and the Nazi Occupation of Europe. Potomac Books. ISBN 978-1-59797-021-1. Archived from the original on 24 December 2015.
- Förster, Jürgen (1998). "Securing 'Living-Space'". In Boog, Horst; Förster, Jürgen; Hoffmann, Joachim; Klink, Ernst; Müller, Rolf-Dieter; Ueberschär, Gerd R. (eds.). The Attack on the Soviet Union. Germany and the Second World War. Vol. IV. Translated by McMurry, Dean S.; Osers, Ewald; Willmot, Louise. Military History Research Office (Germany). Oxford: Clarendon Press. pp. 1189–1244. ISBN 0-19-822886-4.
- Prusin, Alexander Victor (2003). "'Fascist Criminals to the Gallows!': The Holocaust and Soviet War Crimes Trials, December 1945-February 1946". Holocaust and Genocide Studies. 17 (1): 1–30. doi:10.1093/hgs/17.1.1. Project MUSE 43136.
- Smilovitsky, Leonid. "Ghettos in the Gomel Region: Commonalities and Unique Features, 1941-42." JewishGen (11 Nov 2005): n. pag. Belarus Newsletter. Belarus SIG, 11 November 2005. Web. 28 December 2015.
- Spector, Shmuel, and Geoffrey Wigoder. The Encyclopedia of Jewish Life before and during the Holocaust. A-J. New York: New York UP, 2001. Print.
- Smilovit︠s︡kiĭ, Leonid. Katastrofa Evreev v Belorussii, 1941-1944 Gg. Telʹ-Aviv: Biblioteka Matvei︠a︡ Chernogo, 2000. Print.
