= Waitman Wade Beorn =

American historian

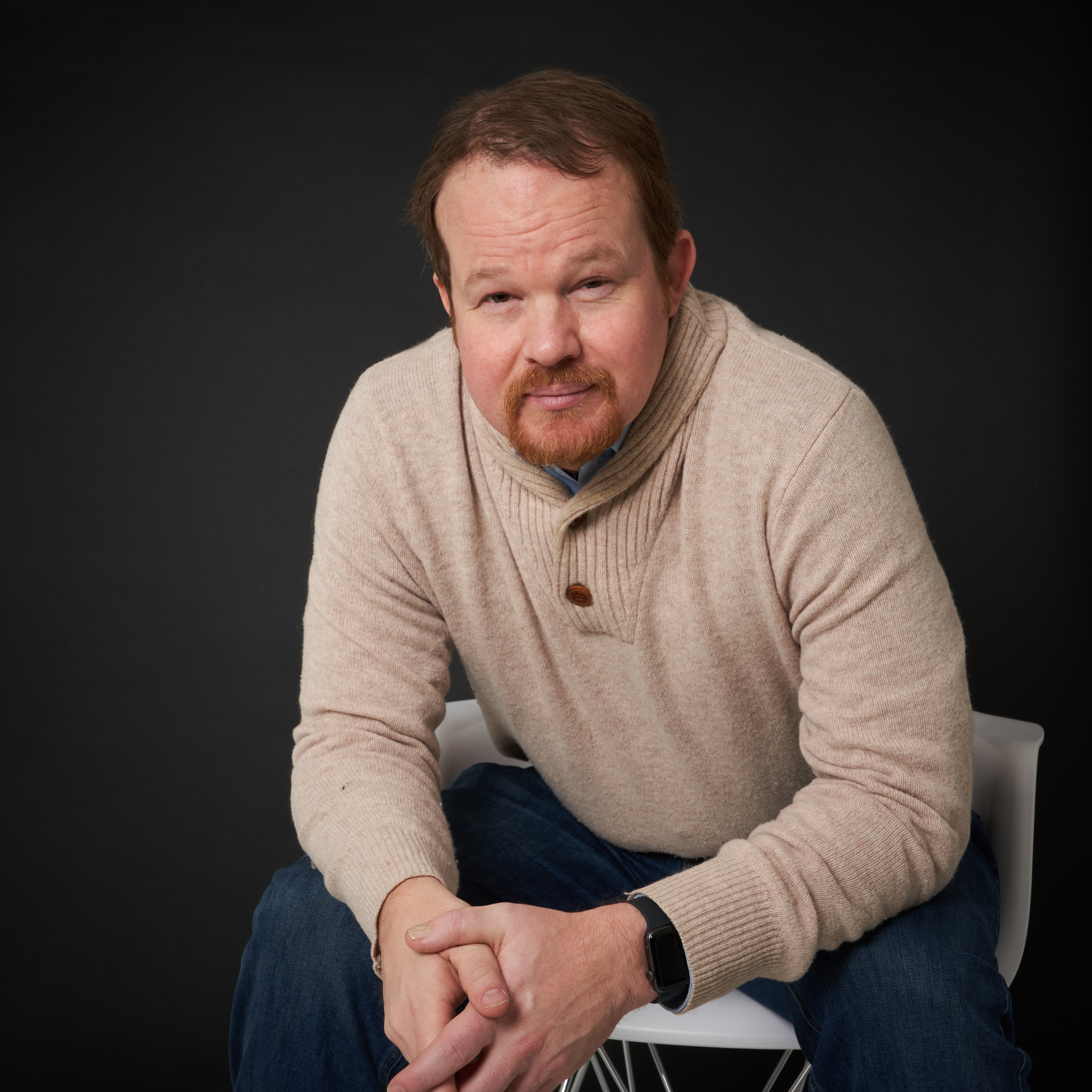
Beorn in 2023

Waitman Wade Beorn is an American historian and former US army officer who specializes in Holocaust studies, focusing on the Holocaust in Eastern Europe. He is currently an Associate Professor in History at Northumbria University in Newcastle upon Tyne. Beorn previously served as the Louis and Frances Blumkin Professor of Holocaust and Genocide Studies at the University of Nebraska Omaha. From 2015 to 2016, he was the executive director of the Virginia Holocaust Museum in Richmond, Virginia.

== Early life ==
Waitman Wade Beorn was born in Richmond, Virginia. He attended St. Christopher's School before matriculating at the United States Military Academy at West Point, New York, graduating in 2000. Beorn was subsequently commissioned into the United States Army, joining the 10th Cavalry Regiment's 1st Squadron at the rank of second lieutenant. He was stationed at Fort Hood in Texas as part of the 4th Infantry Division before being deployed to Iraq as part of Operation Iraqi Freedom, serving there from 2003 to 2004, before leaving service. After leaving the army, he attended the University of North Carolina at Chapel Hill, earning a Doctor of Philosophy in history in 2011.

== Research ==
=== Monographs ===
Dr. Beorn's first book, Marching into Darkness: The Wehrmacht and the Holocaust in Belarus, explored the local participation of the German Army in the Holocaust, It looked at a series of case studies of units in the Generalbezirk Weißruthenien during World War II. It argued for a progression of ever-increasing complicity by the Wehrmacht in genocide. His second book, The Holocaust in Eastern Europe: At the Epicenter of the Final Solution, is a general survey of the Holocaust in the East. His third book is on the Janowska concentration camp. Between the Wires: The Janowska Camp and the Holocaust in Lviv was published by Nebraska University Press in 2024. It was a Finalist for the National Jewish Book Award and won the Omeljan Pritsak Book Prize from the Association for Slavic, East European, and Eurasian Studies. The book also received an Honorable Mention from the American Association for Ukrainian Studies.

=== Digital humanities work ===
Beorn is a founding member of the Holocaust Geographies Collaborative, an interdisciplinary group of scholars interested in exploring how a spatial and digital approach can better inform our understanding of the Holocaust. He is a digital humanist who integrates mapping, modeling, and social network analyses into his work. His current project is Visualizing Janowska: Creating a Digital Architectural Model of a Nazi Concentration Camp. This project is supported by an Arts and Humanities Research Council grant.

== Awards and fellowships ==
- AHRC Research, Development, and Engagement Fellowship, 2023
- Fellow, Royal Historical Society, 2023
- Fellow, UK Higher Education Academy, 2020
- Thomas J. Wilson Prize for Best First Book from Harvard University Press (2014)
- Harry Frank Guggenheim Dissertation Fellowship (2010–2011)
- National Endowment for the Humanities Summer Stipend FT-259641-18 "Between the Wires: The Janowska Camp and the Holocaust in Lviv," 2019
- USC Shoah Foundation Archive Teaching Fellow, 2013–2014
- National Science Foundation (NSF) Grant "Collaborative Research - Holocaust Historical GIS," Award # 0820501 (with Tim Cole, Simone Gigliotti, Alberto Giordano, Anna Holian, Paul Jaskot, Anne Knowles, Marc Masurovsky, and Erik Steiner), 2008–2011
- Fulbright Fellowship, Germany (2008–2009)

== Selected works ==
- Beorn, Waitman Wade. Between the Wires: The Janowska Camp and the Holocaust in Lviv. Lincoln: Nebraska University Press, 2024.
- Beorn, Waitman Wade. Marching into Darkness: The Wehrmacht and the Holocaust in Belarus. Cambridge: Harvard University Press, 2014.
- Beorn, Waitman Wade. The Holocaust in Eastern Europe: At the Epicenter of the Final Solution. London: Bloomsbury Academic Press, 2018.
- Beorn, Waitman Wade. "Understanding the Holocaust in the Context of the Second World War." In Understanding and Teaching the Holocaust, edited by Laura Hilton and Avinoam Patt. Madison WI: Wisconsin University Press, 2020.
- Beorn, Waitman Wade. "All the Other Neighbors: Communal Genocide in Eastern Europe." In The Wiley Blackwell Companion to the Holocaust, edited by Hilary Earl and Simone Gigliotti, 153–72. Hoboken, MJ: Wiley and Sons, 2020.
- Beorn, Waitman Wade. "Unraveling Janowska: Excavating an Understudied Camp through Spatial Testimonies." In Beyond "Ordinary Men": Christopher R. Browning and Holocaust Historiography edited by Thomas Pegelow Kaplan, Jürgen Matthäus and Mark W. Hornburg, 250–68. Paderborn: Verlag Ferdinand Schöningh, 2019.
- Beorn, Waitman Wade. "Safe Simulations? Best Practices for Exercising History in the Classroom." In Teaching Genocide: Insights and Advice from Secondary Teachers and Professors, edited by Samuel Totten, 125–32. New York: Rowman Littlefield, 2018.
- Beorn, Waitman Wade. "Bodily Conquest: Sexual Violence in the Nazi East." In Mass Violence in Nazi-Occupied Europe, edited by Alex J. Kay and David Stahel, 195–215. Bloomington, Indiana USA: Indiana University Press, 2018.
- Beorn, Waitman Wade. "Killing on the Ground and in the Mind: The Spatialities of Genocide in the East." In Geographies of the Holocaust, edited by Anne Kelly Knowles, Tim Cole and Alberto Giordano, 89–118. Bloomington, IN: Indiana University Press, 2014.
