= 221st Security Division =

- 221. Sicherungs-Division
- Active: March 15, 1941 – July 28, 1944
- Country: Nazi Germany
- Branch: Army
- Type: Security division
- Role: Bandenbekämpfung (counter-insurgency)
- Size: Division
- Engagements: Eastern Front

Commanders
- Notable commanders: Johann Pflugbeil

The 221st Security Division (German: 221. Sicherungs-Division) was a rear-area security division in the Wehrmacht during World War II. Commanded by General Johann Pflugbeil, the unit was deployed in German-occupied areas of the Soviet Union, in the Army Group Centre Rear Area, for security and Bandenbekämpfung ("anti-bandit") duties. It was responsible for large-scale war crimes and atrocities including the deaths of thousands of Soviet civilians.

== Operational history ==
=== Formation and Operation Barbarossa ===
The division was formed in Wehrkreis VIII from a third of the 221st Infantry Division on March 15, 1941. Along with Wehrmacht army troops, it included Police Battalion 309 of the Orpo (uniformed police), its only motorised formation. The unit spent three months at the front and six months on rear-area security duties in the Gomel area. Its duties included ensuring the security of communications and supply lines, economic exploitation and combatting partisans in the Wehrmacht's rear areas.

In September 1941, the division's officers attended the Mogilev Conference, organised by General Max von Schenckendorff, commander of Army Group Centre Rear Area. The conference, while ostensibly on "anti-partisan training", resulted in a dramatic increase in atrocities against Jews and other civilians in the last three months of 1941. The division reported shooting 1,847 "partisans" in two months alone. Hostage-taking also increased dramatically. Wehrmacht units were receiving directives that 50 to 100 "communists" were to be killed as atonement for the death of each German soldier.

=== Activities in 1942 ===
In March 1942, the division embarked on large-scale Nazi security warfare operations in the Yelnya-Dorogobuzh area east of Smolensk. The so-called anti-partisan operations in "bandit-infested" areas amounted to destruction of villages, seizure of livestock, deportation of the able-bodied population for slave labour to Germany and killing of those of non-working age. The tactics included shelling villages not under German control with heavy weapons, resulting in mass civilian casualties. General Johann Pflugbeil directed his troops that the "goal of the operation is not to drive the enemy back, but to exterminate him". During the operation, the unit recorded 278 German troops killed, while 806 enemies were reported killed in action and 120 prisoners were handed over to Wehrmacht's Geheime Feldpolizei for execution. Only 200 weapons (rifles, machine-guns and pistols) were seized.

=== Later history ===
The division saw brief front-line duty in October 1943 fighting the Soviet Red Army troops at Gomel. In November, it was again transferred to rear-security duties in Belarus. The unit was largely destroyed during the Soviet Red Army summer offensive, Operation Bagration, in June 1944. The division was disbanded officially on July 28, 1944, after it was already destroyed.

The surviving personnel were absorbed into other security units. The remains of the 350th Infantry Regiment were consolidated into the 3rd Battalion of the 75th Security Regiment, whereas the remainders of the 34th and 45th Security Regiments were joined into the 1st Battalion of the 45th Security Regiment. The 1st Battalion of the 221st Artillery Regiment was made into the 391st Artillery Battalion of the 391st Security Division. The 391st Artillery Battalion was later made into the 1st Battalion of the 1320th Fortress Artillery Regiment, that fought as part of the Fortress Division Warsaw.

== Order of battle ==
=== March 1941 ===
Upon its creation on March 15, 1941, the division had the following units:

- 350th Reinforced Infantry Regiment (I. – III.)
- I./221st Artillery Regiment (3 batteries)
- 701st Guard (Wach) Battalion
- 221st Supply Units (Versorgungs-Einheiten)
- Staff of the 45th Land Defence (Landesschützen) Regiment. This staff was combined with the 302nd, 352nd and 230th Battalions into the 45th Security Regiment on October 15, 1942. So, in late 1942, the division's infantry was formed into the 350th Grenadier Regiment and the 45th Security Regiment.

On December 1, 1941, the division received the 824th Divisional Signal Battalion, which was created from the 38th Field Signal Kommandantur. The division also later received the 1st Battalion of the 8th Police Regiment, which was formed from the 91st Police Battalion.

=== August 1942 ===
In August 1942, the division had, besides the aforemention units, also the:

- 27th Security Regiment (325th, 706th, and 862nd Battalions)
- 44th Security Regiment (573rd and 701st Battalions)

==== Cavalry ====
During the winter of 1942 and 1943, the 221st Cavalry Hundred (Reiter-Hundertschaft) formed part of the division. The unit was also known as the 1st/221st and 2nd/221st Eastern Cavalry Hundreds (1. und 2. Ost-Reiter-Hundertschaft 221). The 1st/221st Squadron was sent to the West in January 1943 as the Cavalry Squadron of the 4th Volunteer Depot Regiment of the Freiwilligen-Stamm-Division.

=== February 1943 ===
In the spring of 1943, the division was near Gomel. It was reinforced with:

- 930th Grenadier Regiment,
- 36th Security Regiment,
- 183rd Security Regiment,
- 604th Eastern Battalion and other units

=== February 1944 ===
At this time, the division was mostly operating in Generalbezirk Weißruthenien and consisted, besides the previous units, of:

- 75th Security Regiment (939th, 598th and 5th Lithuanian Battalions),
- 34th Security Regiment (546th, 468th Battalions, with the 659th Fortress Battalion as the third one),
- 446th Security Battalion,
- 791st Security Battalion

Tanks

Despite sharing the divisions number, the 221st Tank and 221st Panzerjäger Companies did not belong to it but instead to Army Group South.

== See also ==
- War crimes of the Wehrmacht
