= Korück =

Korück is an abbreviation for German Kommandant rückwärtiges Armeegebiet, "Army Rear Area Commander". It referred also to the staff of various units and of varying sizes assigned to the Wehrmacht Armeeoberkommando. In military jargon, Korück did not only stand for the corresponding agency but usually also for the entire rear army area, which was subordinate to this agency, often also for the entire military unit of this agency.

A number identified each army rear area. For example, after the Operation Barbarossa, Korück 582 was given the task of controlling the 9th Army's rear area at the time when its greatest expansion covered around 27,000 km^{2} (10,000 sq mi) with more than 1,500 villages around Vyazma. The units of Korück 582 had a staff of 1,700 men.

The Korück was responsible for securing the supply routes and "pacifying" the occupied area. For this purpose, it was given security divisions (Sicherungs-Division), Territorial Guard (Landesschützen) battalions, field (Feldkommandanturen) and local Kommandantur (Ortskommandanturen) and field gendarmerie units (Feldgendarmerie) as well as units of the secret field police (Geheimen Feldpolizei). The transit camps for prisoners of war (Dulag) were usually controlled by Korücks.

The Korück formed administrative agencies to cover the territory assigned to them. The Oberfeldkommandanturen were divisional level, Feldkommandanturen were regimental level, and Ortskommandanturen were company level.

The tasks of the Korücks changed with the situation in the war. During the retreat of the Wehrmacht some Korücks, such as Korück 594 in Italy, were given the task to maintain order, prevent the spread of panic and fight in its defensive positions to the last man.

== See also ==
- Anti-partisan operations in World War II
- Army Group Rear Area Command (Wehrmacht)
- Bandenbekämpfung
- Eastern Front
- Soviet partisans
