= 707th Infantry Division =

- German: 707. Infanterie-Division
- Active: May 1941–June 1944
- Country: Nazi Germany
- Branch: German Army
- Type: Security division
- Engagements: World War II: Operation Bamberg; Operation Bagration

Commanders
- Notable commanders: Gustav von Bechtolsheim

The 707th Infantry Division, also known as the 707th Security Division, was a German Army division of World War II. It was formed in May 1941, and destroyed by the Red Army in June 1944. The unit was mainly used as a rear-security division in German-occupied areas of the Soviet Union. It was responsible for large-scale war crimes, including the deaths of thousands of Jewish civilians.

== Operational history ==
The 707th Infantry Division was raised at Munich on 2 May 1941, and subsequently undertook training in the region. Historian Ben H. Shepherd described the unit as "an extremely substandard division of the fifteenth wave" to be raised by the German Army during the war, with its personnel being "overaged, undertrained and underequipped". The 707th Infantry Division was also much smaller than the standard size of German infantry divisions, comprising just 5,000 soldiers. All of the division's initial officers, other than its commanding officer until February 1943, Major General Gustav von Bechtolsheim, were reservists. Most soldiers in the division were aged over 30, and the officers were typically even older. Major General von Bechtolsheim and his operations officer were deeply committed Nazis.

In August 1941, the 707th Infantry Division was deployed to the Eastern Front to undertake security duties in the occupied regions of the Soviet Union behind Army Group Centre's front lines. In October 1941, personnel of the division conducted public hangings of resistance members in Minsk, including that of 17-year-old Jewish nurse Masha Bruskina. The 707th Infantry Division and attached Order Police units murdered over 10,000 individuals, most of whom were Jews, in Belorussia between October and November 1941. Almost all of the division's officers and enlisted personnel willingly took part in these killings; the small number who refused were only lightly punished. This operation was initiated by von Bechtolsheim, who issued orders explicitly calling for the "annihilation" and "extermination" of Jews. Other German Army units undertook similar killings.

The 707th Infantry Division continued to undertake security duties in German-occupied areas of the Soviet Union for the remainder of 1941 and throughout 1942 and 1943. During the spring and early summer of 1942 the division conducted a so-called "anti-partisan operation" designated Operation Bamberg in which more than 4,000 Soviet citizens – the majority of whom were civilian farmers – were killed. Shepherd has written that while other German security divisions also killed large numbers of civilians during such operations, the 707th Infantry Division had the worst record. Historian Jeff Rutherford made a similar comparison, labelling the 707th "infamous".

From January 1944 the 707th Infantry Division was used as a front-line unit in defensive roles. On 23 June, at the start of the major Soviet Operation Bagration offensive, it formed part of Army Group Centre's reserve. Later in June the division was encircled and destroyed by Soviet forces near Bobruisk. It was formally disbanded on 3 August 1944.

== Structure ==
The 707th Infantry Division comprised the following units throughout its existence:

- 727th Infantry Regiment
- 747th Infantry Regiment
- 657th Artillery Battalion
- 707th Engineer Company
- 707th Signal Company
- 707th Divisional Supply Troops

== Commanders ==
Divisional commanders of the 707. ID:
Period	Rank	Name
3 May 1941 - 22 February 1943	Generalmajor	Gustav von Bechtolsheim
22 February - 25 April 1943	Oberst	Hans Freiherr von Falkenstein
25 April - 1 June 1943	Generalleutnant	Wilhelm Rußwurm
1 June - 3 December 1943	Generalleutnant	Rudolf Busich
3 December 1943 - 12 January 1944	Generalmajor	Alexander Conrady
12 January - 15 May 1944	Generalleutnant	Rudolf Busich
15 May - 27 June 1944	Generalmajor	Gustav Gihr (POW)

== See also ==
- War crimes of the Wehrmacht
