= Joachim Witthöft =

German general during WWII

- Born: 23 September 1887; Marienwerder, German Empire
- Died: 7 July 1966 (aged 78); Dalheim-Rödgen, West Germany
- Military career
- Allegiance: German Empire; Weimar Republic; Nazi Germany
- Branch: German Army
- Service years: 1906–1945
- Rank: General der Infanterie
- Commands: XXVII Army Corps; Army Group South Rear Area (Army Group B)
- Conflicts: World War I; World War II; Battle of France; Operation Barbarossa; Battle of Smolensk (1941); Battle of Moscow; Battles of Rzhev
- Awards: Knight's Cross of the Iron Cross

Joachim Witthöft (23 September 1887 – 7 July 1966) was a German general during World War II. He was a recipient of the Knight's Cross of the Iron Cross. Witthöft commanded Army Group South Rear Area (as Army Group B) during the 1942 Wehrmacht's campaign.

Like other Army Group Rear Areas, the territories under Witthöft's control were the sites of mass murder during the Holocaust and other crimes against humanity targeting the civilian population. Rear Area commanders operated in parallel, and in cooperation, with the Higher SS and Police Leaders appointed by the head of the SS, Heinrich Himmler, for each of the army group's rear areas. In the words of historian Michael Parrish, these army commanders "presided over an empire of terror and brutality".

== Awards and decorations ==
- Knight's Cross of the Iron Cross on 14 December 1941 as Generalleutnant and commander of the 86th Infantry Division

Military offices
Preceded by None	Commander of 86th Infantry Division; 26 August 1939 – 1 January 1942	Succeeded by General Helmuth Weidling
Preceded by General Eccard Freiherr von Gablenz	Commander of XXVII Army Corps; 3 January 1942 – 1 July 1942	Succeeded by Generaloberst Walter Weiß
Preceded by	Commander of Army Group South Rear Area (Army Group B); 21 July 1942 – 10 January 1943	Succeeded by
