= Friedrich Mieth =

German general (1888–1944)

- Born: 4 June 1888; Eberswalde, Province of Brandenburg, Kingdom of Prussia, German Empire
- Died: 29 August 1944 (aged 56); Vutcani, Romania
- Relatives: ∞ 1928 Edith von Seeler
- Military career
- Allegiance: Kingdom of Prussia; German Empire; Weimar Republic; Nazi Germany
- Branch: Prussian Army; Imperial German Army; Reichsheer; German Army
- Service years: 1906-1944
- Rank: General der Infanterie
- Commands: Army Group Don Rear Area; IV Army Corps
- Conflicts: World War I; World War II; Battle of France; Operation Barbarossa; Battle of Białystok–Minsk; Battle of Kiev (1941); Battle of Moscow; Battle of the Caucasus; Lower Dnieper Offensive; Dnieper–Carpathian Offensive; First Jassy-Kishinev Offensive; Jassy–Kishinev Offensive (KIA)
- Awards: Knight's Cross of the Iron Cross with Oak Leaves

Friedrich Julius Oskar Mieth (4 June 1888 – 29 August 1944) was a German general during World War II. In 1942, he commanded Army Group Don Rear Area.

== Death ==
Following the major offensive launched by the 2nd Ukrainian Front on 20 August 1944 near the Prut River, his corps was encircled during the Battle of Iași and subsequently completely destroyed. Mieth died on the morning of 29 August 1944 as the remnants of the 79th Infantry Division—accompanied by other units and stragglers—crossed the Bârlad River near the village of Vutcani under enemy artillery and mortar fire, and launched an assault on a Soviet position that was blocking the path of the retreating troops. Mieth himself was engaged in close-quarters combat alongside the combat engineers. Due to conflicting reports, it remains unclear whether he was killed by a Soviet bullet or died of a heart attack.

== Awards and decorations ==
- Iron Cross (1914), 2nd and 1st Class
  - 2nd Class on 17 September 1914
  - 1st Class on 11 March 1915
- Military Merit Order (Bavaria), 4th Class with Swords (BMV4bX/BM4X) on 7 January 1915
- Brunswick War Merit Cross, 2nd Class (BrKr2/BrK2) on 22 March 1917
- Military Merit Cross (Austria-Hungary), 3rd Class with the War Decoration (ÖM3K) on 6 December 1917
- Gallipoli Star (TH) on 29 January 1918
- Wound Badge (1918) in Black in April 1918
- Honour Cross of the World War 1914/1918 with Swords on 29 December 1934
- Wehrmacht Long Service Award, 4th to 1st Class on 2 October 1936
- Repetition Clasp 1939 to the Iron Cross 1914, 2nd and 1st Class
  - 2nd Class on 29 October 1939
  - 1st Class on 4 February 1940
- Order of the Crown of Italy, Grand Officer with Star on 11 March 1942
- Eastern Front Medal on 1 August 1942
- German Cross in Gold on 26 December 1941 as Generalleutnant and commander of the 112. Infanterie-Division
- Romanian Order of Michael the Brave, 3rd Class
- Knight's Cross of the Iron Cross with Oak Leaves
  - Knight's Cross on 2 November 1943 as General der Infanterie and commander of IV. Armeekorps
  - Oak Leaves on 1 March 1944 as General der Infanterie and commander of IV. Armeekorps
- Referenced twice by name in the Wehrmachtbericht on 18 February 1944 and 8 June 1944

== Sources ==
- German Federal Archives: BArch PERS 6/279 and PERS 6/300240

Military offices
Preceded by Generalmajor Hans-Heinrich Sixt von Armin	Chief of the General Staff of XII Army Corps; 10 November 1938 – 26 August 1939	Succeeded by Oberst Maximilian Grimmeiß
Preceded by none	Chief of the General Staff of 1st Army; 26 August 1939 – 24 October 1940	Succeeded by Generalmajor Carl Hilpert
Preceded by none	Commander of 112nd Infantry Division; 10 December 1940 – 10 November 1942	Succeeded by Generalmajor Albert Newiger
Preceded by General der Artillerie Max Pfeffer	Commander of IV Army Corps; December 1942 – 2 September 1944	Succeeded by none
