= 403rd Security Division =

- 403. Sicherungs-Division
- Active: 1939–1943
- Country: Nazi Germany
- Branch: Army (Wehrmacht)
- Type: Security division
- Size: Division
- Engagements: World War II

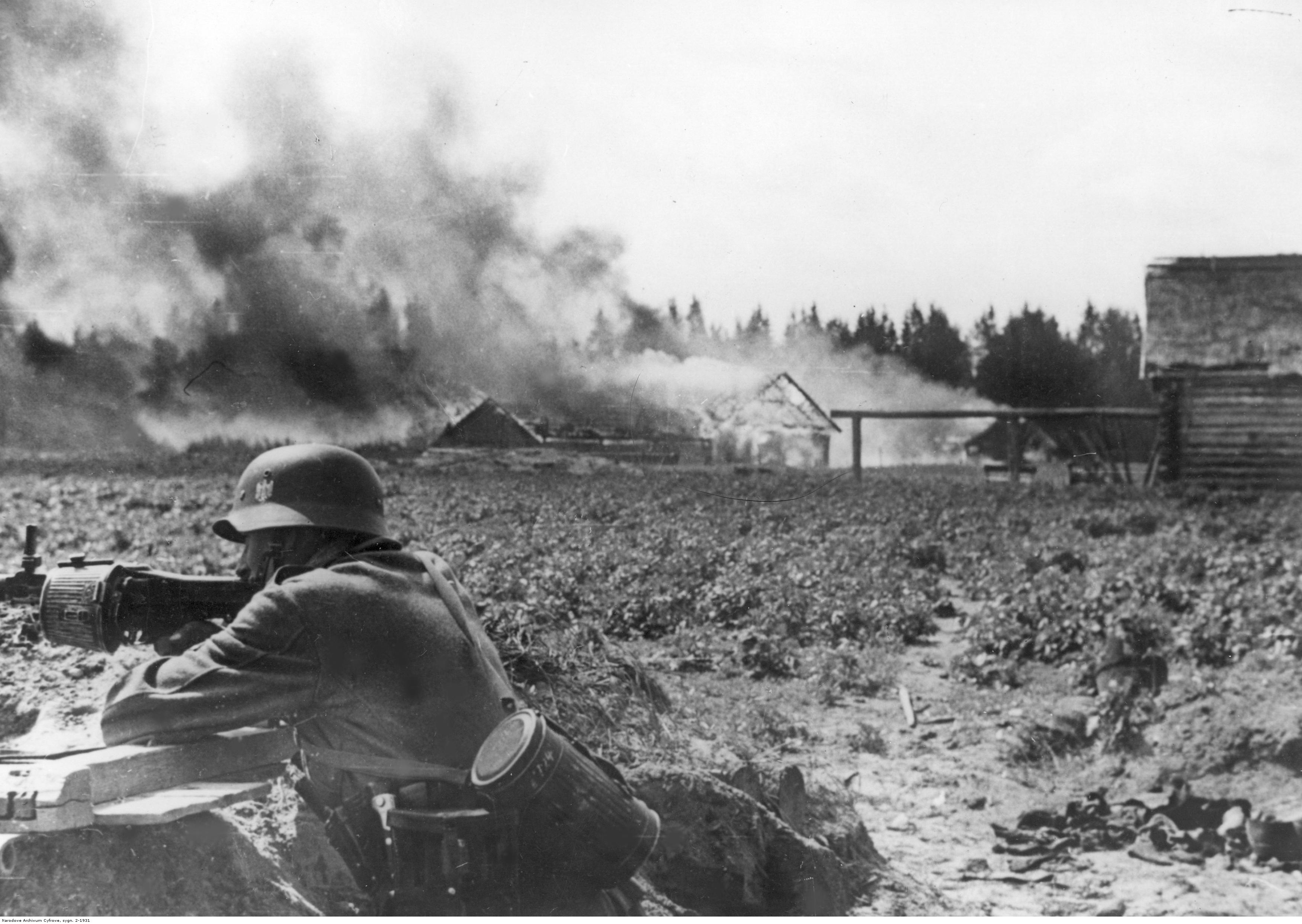
Counter-partisan action by German soldiers on the Eastern Front

The 403rd Security Division (403. Sicherungs-Division) was a rear-security division in the Wehrmacht of Nazi Germany. Throughout the war, the unit was deployed in the Army Group Centre and Army Group South Rear Area behind the Eastern Front, which was a large, German-occupied area of the Soviet Union. During the whole war, the 403rd Security Division was used throughout the war mainly on the Eastern Front for security tasks in the rear army area, such as capturing scattered Soviet soldiers and commissars. Further antisemitic measures, such as confiscations, removal of functions, the formation of "purely" Jewish houses, followed.

== Operational history ==
=== Division z.b.V. 403 ===
The Division z.b.V. 403, alternatively known as Landesschützen-Division 403, was established on 25 October 1939 in Spandau, which was in the III Military District. It was to consist of ten Territorial Guard (Landesschützen) battalions from the III Military District. August 1940 onwards, the division was part of the 6th Army, which was at the time in Brittany. It was renamed to 403rd Security Division in March 1942.

=== 403rd Security Division ===
==== Formation ====
The division was formed on 15 March 1941 near Neusalz in Silesia, in the VIII Military District, from the staff of Division z.b.V. 403 and elements of the 213th Infantry Division.

==== 1941 ====
In 1941, the division fought in the Battle of Moscow and the Battle of Smolensk as part of the Army Group Reserve. During this period, the division was used against the civilian population and burned down numerous villages.

==== 1942 ====
At the beginning of 1942, the fallback line of the division was broken by the Red Army near Toropets. In the summer of 1942, the division partook in actions against Jews in eastern Ukraine.

==== 1943 ====
At the beginning of 1943 the division was split into parts, with one part being assigned to the XXIVth Panzer Corps of the 2nd Panzer Army and the other to the XXXXth Army Corps assigned to the 4th Army. On 31 May 1943 in southern Russia, the division was dissolved.

The division staff moved to Bergen in June 1943 and became the staff of the 265th Infantry Division.

== Commanders ==
Commanding officers

No.	Portrait	Commander	Took office	Left office	Time in office
1	Wolgang von Ditfurth	Oberst/Generalmajor/Generalleutnant; Wolgang von Ditfurth	25 October 1939	May 1942	2 years, 188 days
2	Wilhelm Rußwurm	Generalleutnant; Wilhelm Rußwurm	May 1942	31 May 1943	1 year, 1 day
