= Army Group Centre Rear Area =

- Rückwärtiges Heeresgebiet Mitte
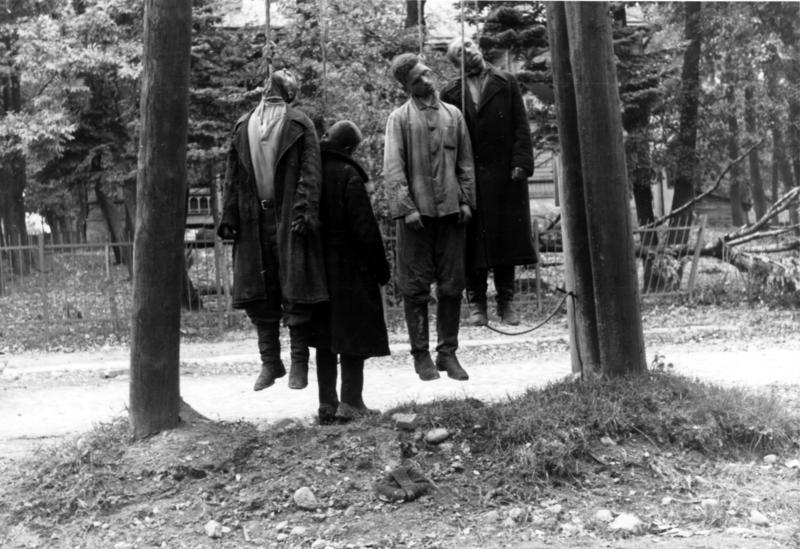
- Victims hanged by the German security troops in the Soviet Union, August/September 1941
- Active: 1941–1944
- Country: Nazi Germany
- Branch: Army (Wehrmacht)
- Part of: Army Group Centre and Army High Command
- Engagements: World War II

Commanders
- Notable commanders: Max von Schenckendorff; Ludwig Kübler; Edwin von Rothkirch und Trach

Army Group Centre Rear Area (German: Rückwärtiges Heeresgebiet Mitte) was one of the three Army Group Rear Area Commands, established during the 1941 German invasion of the Soviet Union. Initially commanded by General Max von Schenckendorff, it was an area of military jurisdiction behind Wehrmacht's Army Group Centre.

The Group Centre Rear Area's outward function was to provide security behind the fighting troops. It was also a site of mass murder during The Holocaust and other crimes against humanity targeting the civilian population. In the words of historian Michael Parrish, the army commander "presided over an empire of terror and brutality".

== Organisation ==
The commander of the Army Group Centre Rear Area, General Max von Schenckendorff, was responsible for the rear area security. Its headquarters was subordinated to Army Group Centre, while also reporting to the Wehrmacht's Quartermaster General Eduard Wagner, who had the overall responsibility for rear area security.

Schenckendorff controlled three Security Divisions (221st, 286th, and 403rd) and oversaw the units of Secret Field Police of the Wehrmacht. He operated in parallel, and in cooperation, with Erich von dem Bach-Zelewski, the Higher SS and Police Leaders appointed by the head of the SS, Heinrich Himmler.

== Security warfare and crimes against humanity ==
The area commanders' duties included security of communications and supply lines, economic exploitation and combatting guerillas (partisans) in Wehrmacht's rear areas, which were the primary tasks of the security divisions. In addition, security and police formations of the SS and the SD (SS Security Service) operated in the areas, being subordinated to the respective Higher SS and Police Leaders. These units included multiple Einsatzgruppen death squad detachments, Police Regiment Centre and additional Order Police battalions (see Police Battalion 45). These units perpetrated mass murder during The Holocaust and other crimes against humanity.

The security formations, often in coordination with or under the leadership of the Wehrmacht, conducted security warfare targeting civilian population. The so-called anti-partisan operations in "bandit-infested" areas amounted to destruction of villages, seizure of livestock, deporting of able-bodied population for slave labour to Germany and murder of those of non-working age.
