= Karl von Roques =

German general and war criminal

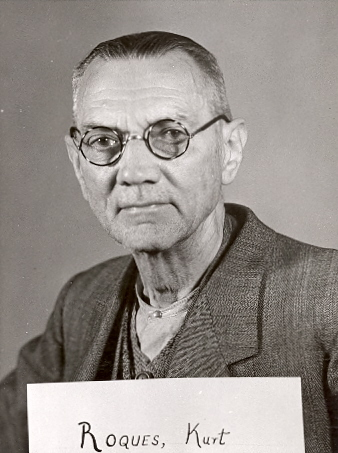
- Roques's mugshot after his indictment for the Nuremberg Military Tribunal in 1947
- Born: 7 May 1880; Frankfurt am Main, German Empire
- Died: 24 December 1949 (aged 69); Nuremberg, Bavaria, West Germany
- Known for: War crimes of the Wehrmacht
- Status: Deceased
- Convictions: War crimes Crimes against humanity
- Trial: High Command Trial
- Penalty: 20 years imprisonment
- Military career
- Relatives: Franz von Roques (cousin)
- Allegiance: Nazi Germany
- Branch: Luftwaffe; German Army
- Service years: 1900–1933; 1939–1943
- Rank: General der Infanterie
- Commands: Army Group South Rear Area
- Conflicts: World War II

Karl Jerome Christian Georg Kurt von Roques (7 May 1880 – 24 December 1949) was a German general and war criminal during the Second World War, who commanded the Army Group Rear Area behind Army Group South. Following the war, Roques was sentenced to 20 years imprisonment in the High Command Trial. He died in 1949 while serving his sentence.

== Career ==
Karl von Roques was born in a German noble family of Huguenot descent. He entered the German Imperial Army in 1899. During the First World War, Roques served in staff roles in several divisions. By the end of the war he was promoted to major. After the armistice, Roques remained in the Reichswehr, serving in the Ministry of War, and then in staff and command roles in the army. Starting in 1934, Roques served as chief of staff and then the president of the Reichsluftschutzbund. In October 1938 he was recalled to active duty and in the Luftwaffe with the rank of lieutenant-general. In June 1939, Roques left the Luftwaffe with the rank of general.

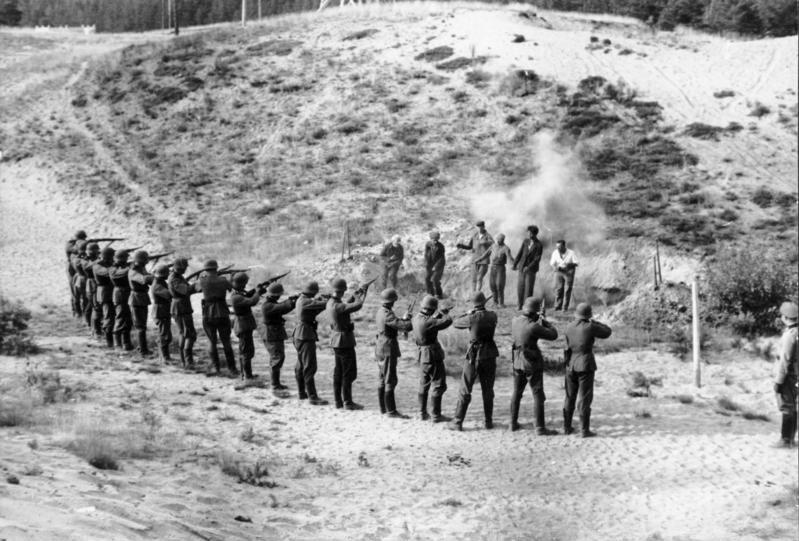
Execution of alleged partisans by German soldiers, September 1941

During the Second World War, Roques served as an active officer in the Wehrmacht. In December 1939, he was given command of the new 143rd Infantry Division. From 15 March 1941 to October 1941, he was commander of the rear areas of Army Group South. On 1 July 1941, Roques was promoted to General der Infanterie.

As commander of the rear areas, Roques carried out extermination policies against the Soviet partisans, Slavic and Jewish population. In October 1941, Roques was transferred to the Führerreserve. In June 1942 he assumed command of the rear areas of Army Group South, and after the dividing of the army group in Army Group A and Army Group B, he commanded the rear areas of the former. On 1 January 1943, Roques was again placed in the Führerreserve and on 31 March 1943 he was again pensioned off. In August 1943 he went to Warsaw as a representative of the German Red Cross.

== Trial and conviction ==
After the German capitulation, Roques was arrested and tried in the High Command Trial. He was sentenced to 20 years imprisonment. Moved for reasons of bad health from Landsberg Prison to a hospital in Nuremberg, he died there on 24 December 1949.
