= Eduard Wagner =

Nazi Germany general (1894–1944)

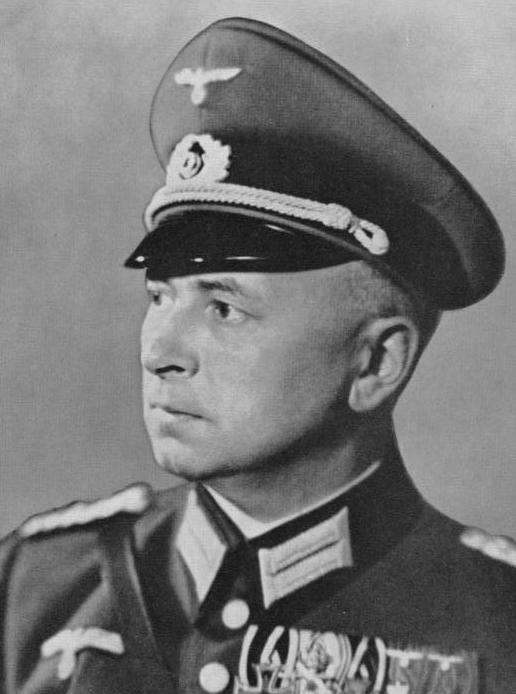
- Wagner in 1939
- Born: 1 April 1894; Kirchenlamitz, Bavaria, Germany
- Died: 23 July 1944 (aged 50); Zossen, Brandenburg, Nazi Germany
- Cause of death: Suicide by gunshot
- Military career
- Allegiance: German Empire; Weimar Republic; Nazi Germany
- Branch: German Army
- Rank: General der Artillerie
- Commands: Quartermaster-General of the German Army
- Conflicts: World War I; World War II

Eduard Wagner (1 April 1894 – 23 July 1944) was a general in the Army of Nazi Germany who served as quartermaster-general during World War II.

== Life ==
Wagner was born in Kirchenlamitz, Upper Franconia. After service during World War I, he was a member of the Reichswehr. During World War II, he served as the quartermaster-general from 1941 to 1944 and was promoted to lieutenant general on 1 August 1943.

On 24 July 1939, he drew up regulations that allowed German soldiers to take hostages from civilian populations and execute them in response to resistance. He personally welcomed the idea of future invasion of Poland and wrote that he looked to it "gladly." Wagner had a central role in the death sentences for ten Polish prisoners who were taken during the defense of the Polish Post Office in Danzig.

In May 1941, he drew up the regulations with Reinhard Heydrich that ensured that the army and the Einsatzgruppen would co-operate in murdering Soviet Jews. On the Eastern Front, he had a role in ensuring that suitable winter clothing was supplied to the German forces. On 27 November 1941 he reported, "We are at the end of our resources in both personnel and material. We are about to be confronted with the dangers of deep winter."

Wagner created policies against Soviet POWs. On 13 November 1941, he declared that ill Soviet prisoners-of-war who were unfit for labor should be allowed to starve to death. Rations for the rest were cut, which ultimately resulted in the deaths of an estimated two million Soviet POWs during the winter of 1941–1942. By the end of the war, 3.3 million Soviet prisoners died in German captivity, out of a total of 5.7 million POWs. Wagner also advocated for the Siege of Leningrad.

During the summer of 1942, before his visit to inspect the 6th Army during the Battle of Stalingrad, he informed Hitler of the "lack of sources of fuel." By then, "all the generals avoided contradicting Hitler," as "all feared the hysterical outbursts of this lofty dictator."

Wagner became a conspirator against Hitler. When Claus von Stauffenberg sought approval for an assassination attempt on 15 July 1944, Wagner was cited as being definite that the assassination of Hitler should be attempted only if Himmler was also present. On 20 July, Wagner arranged the airplane that flew Stauffenberg from Rastenburg back to Berlin after the July 20 plot bomb that was believed to have killed Hitler. After the failure of the coup attempt, Wagner feared that his arrest by the Gestapo was imminent and that he might be forced to implicate other plotters. He shot himself in the head at noon on 23 July 1944.
