= Security Division (Wehrmacht) =

German military unit in World War II

Security Divisions (German: Sicherungs-Divisionen) were German rear-area military units engaged in Nazi security warfare in occupied Europe during World War II. Almost all divisions were employed in areas on the Eastern front with the exception of the 325th Security Division which operated within occupied France. The units were tasked with fighting local partisans, intelligence, and counterinsurgency against resistance groups, rounding up Jews and other ethnic groups as part of the Holocaust, and conducting punitive actions in civilian areas. These divisions carried out numerous war crimes.

== History ==
The Wehrmacht security divisions were set up at the beginning of 1941 and were intended to perform policing, security and counter-insurgency duties in the rear of the main German field armies, under the direction of the respective army rear area command, or Korück. They were organised from divisions initially raised in the 3rd wave of mobilisation, these being former Landwehr divisions largely manned by second-line reservists.

As Rear Security Divisions they were not well equipped like front line troops, some of the divisions started out as infantry divisions but once they were assigned to rear security, their heavy weapons were sent off to be used by front line troops.

Many of the Security Divisions were thrown into frontline service during the major Soviet offensives of 1944, such as Operation Bagration, and destroyed in the process. Some were rebuilt as standard infantry divisions due to the chronic manpower shortages of the Wehrmacht in this period.

== Organization ==
Security divisions were often made up of soldiers from the reserve and in 1942 Landeschützen (territorial guard) troops. Police battalions were also part of the divisions, which were supposed to be provided with one standard regiment of troops, plus an artillery detachment, as a 'strike force', though in practice this was often used for frontline duty as local conditions demanded. In many cases, the Security Divisions also included battalions of Ukrainian, Russian or French soldiers as well as a unit of captured foreign tanks. Their exact organisation varied widely between individual formations and during the course of the war (see the 286th Security Division for example).

- 52nd Security Division
- 201st Security Division
- 203rd Security Division
- 207th Security Division
- 213th Security Division
- 221st Security Division
- 281st Security Division
- 285th Security Division
- 286th Security Division
- 325th Security Division
- 390th Security Division
- 391st Security Division
- 403rd Security Division
- 444th Security Division
- 454th Security Division
- 707th Infantry Division

Almost all the Security Divisions operated on the Eastern front, with the exception of the 325th which operated in occupied France.

== War crimes ==
The Security Divisions of the Wehrmacht were responsible for a large number of war crimes and in many cases for systematic programmes of repression against the civilian population. This notably occurred on the Eastern Front, particularly in the rear areas of Army Group Centre, where they acted with extreme brutality.

== Bibliography ==
- Bartov, Omer. Hitler's Army: Soldiers, Nazis, and War in the Third Reich, OUP, 1992. ISBN 978-0195079036
- Gerlach, Christian. Kalkulierte Morde, 2000. ISBN 978-3930908639
- Shepherd, Ben. War in the Wild East: The German Army and Soviet Partisans, Harvard University Press, 2004. ISBN 978-0674012967
