= Army Group Courland =

German army group formed in 1945

- German: Heeresgruppe Kurland
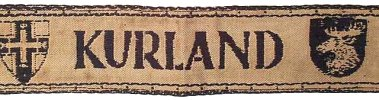
- Armband
- Active: 25 January – 10 May 1945
- Country: Nazi Germany
- Branch: Heer ( Wehrmacht)
- Type: Army group

Commanders
- Last commander: Carl Hilpert
- Chief-of-Staff: Friedrich Foertsch
- Notable commanders: Lothar Rendulic

Army Group Courland (German: Heeresgruppe Kurland) was a German Army Group on the Eastern Front. It was created from remnants of the Army Group North, isolated in the Courland Peninsula by the advancing Soviet Army forces during the 1944 Baltic Offensive of the Second World War. The army group remained isolated in the Courland Pocket until the end of World War II in Europe. All units of the Army Group were ordered to surrender by the capitulated Wehrmacht command on 8 May 1945.

At the time agreed for all German armed forces to end hostilities (see the German Instrument of Surrender, 1945), the Sixteenth and Eighteenth armies of Army Group Courland, commanded by General (of Infantry) Carl Hilpert, ended hostilities at 23:00, on 8 May 1945, surrendering to Leonid Govorov, commander of the Leningrad Front. By the evening of 9 May 1945 189,000 German troops, including 42 officers in the rank of general, in the Courland Pocket had surrendered.

== History ==
=== Naming ===
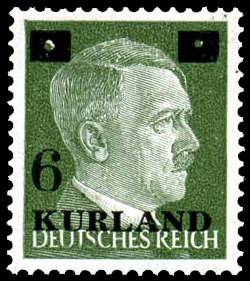
Stamp used in Courland pocket (1945)

The aggregation of troops that became named Army Group Courland was created when the Red Army reached the Baltic Sea near the Memel river on Tuesday, 10 October 1944.

As a result, what was then known as Army Group North was cut off in one section of Latvia from the rest of the German Army and was to stay cut off for the remainder of the war. Approximately 200,000 German troops in 26 divisions were in what was to become known as the Courland Pocket, pushed against the Baltic Sea in the West, the Irbe Strait in the North and the Gulf of Riga in the East. It covers northwestern Latvia. Army Group Courland remained in existence until the end of the war in Europe.

Army Group Courland was created on 25 January 1945, when German dictator Adolf Hitler renamed Army Group North, Army Group Center, and Army Group A. Hitler's name changes meant that Army Group North became Army Group Courland (Heeresgruppe Kurland), Army Group Center became Army Group North (Heeresgruppe Nord), and Army Group A became Army Group Center (Heeresgruppe Mitte).

=== Isolation ===
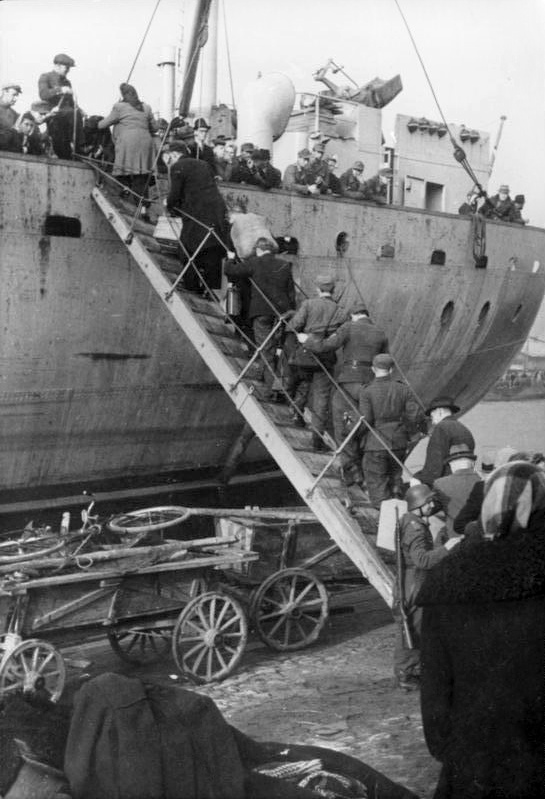
German civilians and soldiers of Army Group Courland evacuate via Windau (Ventspils), 19 October 1944.

Army Group Courland consisted of the German Sixteenth Army and the German Eighteenth Army. The two armies had been sent to Courland partly to protect training grounds for the remaining Nazi U-boat forces.

Bypassed by the main Soviet thrusts, Army Group Courland remained relatively intact. Even towards the end of the war, the army was able to field between twenty-four and thirty-one divisions, with the exact number of divisions depending on how many of the associated or understrength divisions are counted. Even so, with its back to the Baltic Sea, it also remained largely cut off from re-supply, and was unable to break out or evacuate.

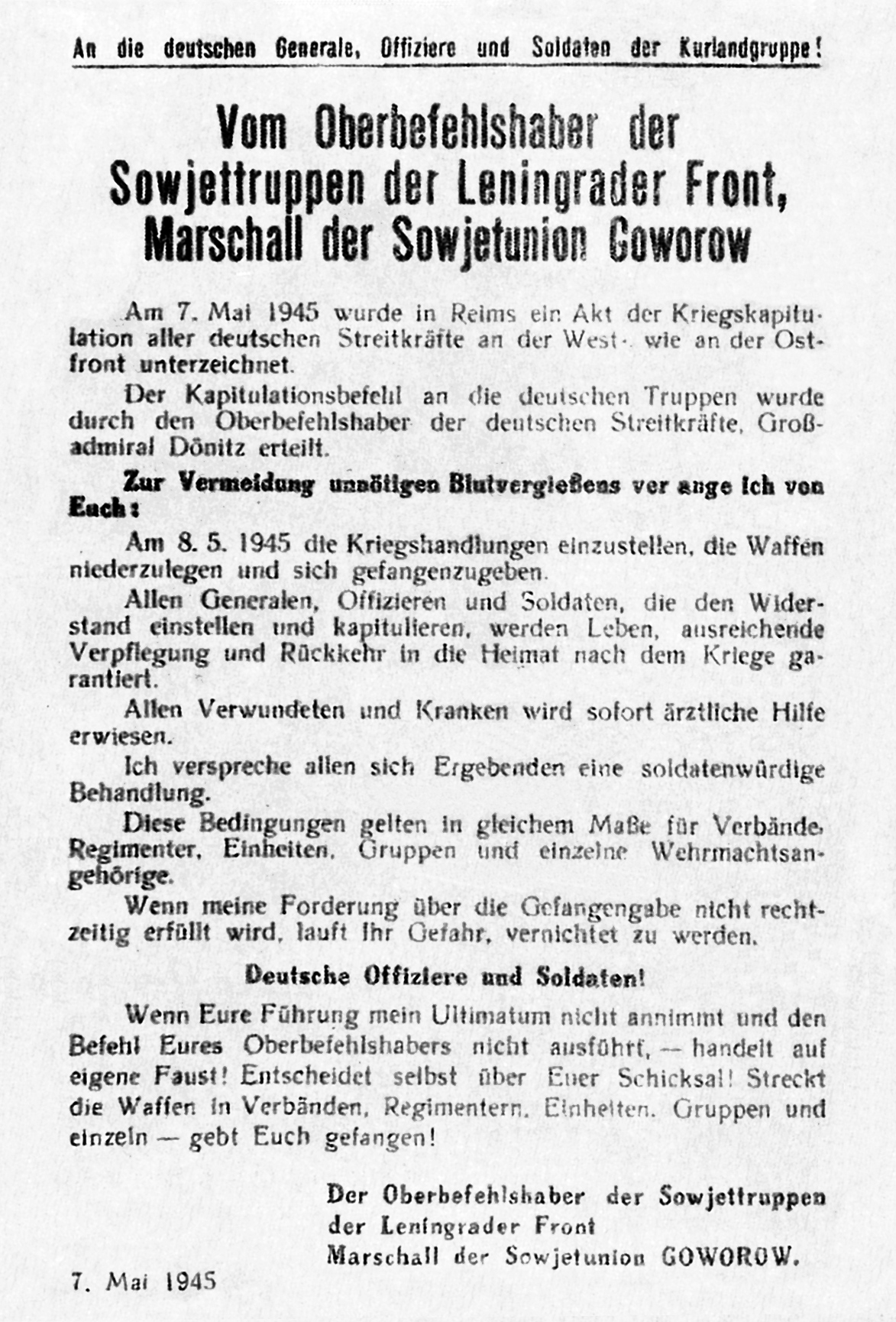
Soviet ultimatum

On 7 May 1945, German Head of State (Staatsoberhaupt) and President (Reichspräsident) Karl Dönitz ordered Colonel-General Carl Hilpert, to surrender Army Group Courland. Hilpert was the army group's last commander-in-chief. Hilpert surrendered himself, his personal staff, and three divisions of the XXXVIII Corps to Marshal of the Soviet Union Leonid Govorov. Hilpert sent the following message to his troops: "To all ranks! Marshal Govorod [sic] has agreed to a cease-fire beginning at 14:00 hours on 8 May. Troops to be informed immediately. White flags to be displayed. Commander expects loyal implementation of order, on which the fate of all Courland troops depends."

On 8 May, a General Otto Friedrich Rauser (Chief of Logistics of the Army Group) succeeded in obtaining better surrender terms from the Soviets. On 9 May, the Soviet commission in Peilei started to interrogate the captive staff of Army Group Courland. The Soviets began a general round-up of all remaining German troops in the Courland Pocket. By the end of 11 May, the troops of the Leningrad Front had secured the Courland peninsula, reaching the coast of the Riga Bay and the Baltic Sea.

From 9 May to 12 May 140,408 men and non-commissioned officers, 5,083 officers and 28 generals in the Courland Pocket, surrendered. The equipment captured in the same period consisted of 75 aircraft; 307 tanks and self-propelled guns; 1,427 guns; 557 mortars; 3,879 machine-guns; 52,887 rifles and submachine guns; 219 armored personnel carriers; 310 radio stations; 4,281 motor vehicles; 240 tractors, 3,442 carts loaded with military cargoes, 14,056 horses.

On 23 May, the Soviet round-up of the German troops in the Courland Pocket was completed. A total of about 180,000 German troops were taken into captivity. Captive German officers were turned over to the NKVD. The bulk of the captives were taken to camps in Valdai Hills.

=== Aftermath ===
After the surrender, some elements of Army Group Courland briefly attempted to reform itself as a Freikorps. This was an act reminiscent of similar actions taken at the end of World War I, but atypical for the end of World War II. The formation of a Freikorps was prevented by the Soviets, who were obviously unwilling to allow such an action by a beaten foe. In addition, the Soviets did not intend for Germans to remain settled in the Courland area after the war.

A number of German, Estonian and Latvian soldiers evaded Soviet capture. Approximately 4000 Latvian soldiers went to the forests and formed partisan organizations to continue their fight against the Soviets and to gain independence for the Soviet-occupied Latvia.

== Commanders ==
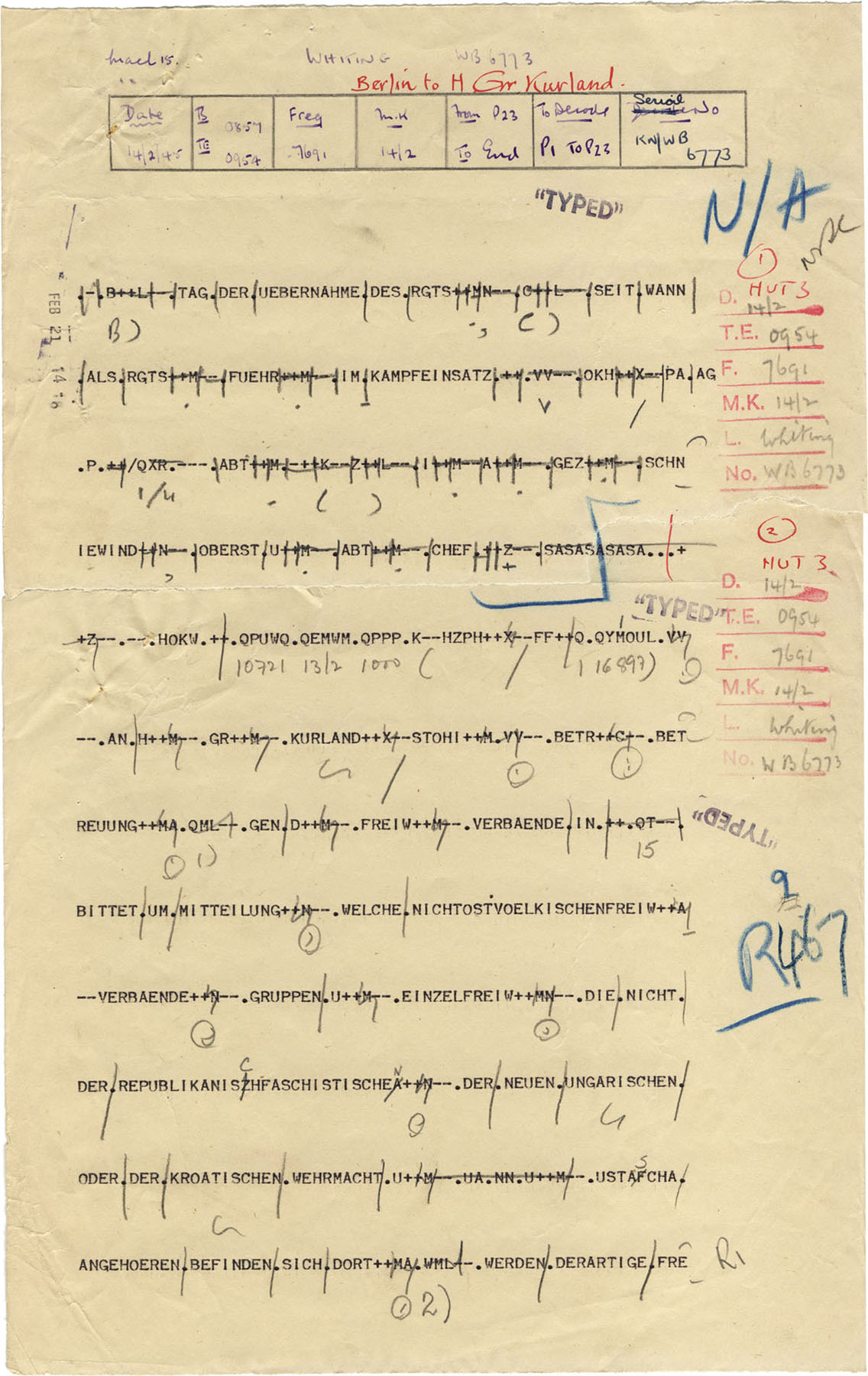
Ultra decrypt of a message from Berlin to Army Group Courland, 14 February 1945

No.	Portrait	Commander	Took office	Left office	Time in office
1	Lothar Rendulic	Generaloberst; Lothar Rendulic (1887–1971)	15 January 1945	27 January 1945	12 days
2	Heinrich von Vietinghoff	Generaloberst; Heinrich von Vietinghoff (1887–1952)	27 January 1945	10 March 1945	42 days
(1)	Lothar Rendulic	Generaloberst; Lothar Rendulic (1887–1971)	10 March 1945	25 March 1945	15 days
3	Carl Hilpert	Generaloberst; Carl Hilpert (1888–1947)	25 March 1945	8 May 1945	44 days

== Senior officers at capitulation ==
- General of Infantry Carl Hilpert, Commander of Army Group Courland;
- Lieutenant-General Friedrich Foertsch, Chief of Staff of the German Army Group Courland;
- Major-General Otto Friedrich Rauser, Chief of Logistics of the Army Group Courland;
- Lieutenant-General Keler, chief of the veterinary service of the Army Group Courland;
- Lieutenant-General Volckamer von Kirchensittenbach, Commander of the Sixteenth Army;
- Lieutenant-General Ehrenfried-Oskar Boege, Commander of the Eighteenth Army;
- Lieutenant-General Usinger, Commander of the I Army Corps;
- Lieutenant-General Gause, Commander of the II Army Corps;
- General of Artillery Thomaschki, Commander of the X Army Corps;
- Lieutenant-General Weber, Commander of the XVI Army Corps;
- General of Artillery Herzog, Commander of the XXXVIII Army Corps;
- Lieutenant-General Feyerabend, Commander of the 11th Infantry Division;
- Major-General Schultz, Commander of the 24th Infantry Division;
- Major-General Henze, Commander of the 30th Infantry Division;
- Lieutenant-General Franz Eccard von Bentivegni, Commander of the 81st Infantry Division;
- Lieutenant-General Strachwitz, Commander of the 87th Infantry Division;
- Major-General Ottomar Hansen, Commander of the 121st Infantry Division;
- Major-General Schatz, Commander of the 122nd Infantry Division;
- Major-General Haehling, Commander of the 126th Infantry Division;
- Major-General Demme, Commander of the 132nd Infantry Division;
- Major-General Giese, Commander of the 205th Infantry Division;
- Lieutenant-General Ranck, Commander of the 218th Infantry Division;
- Major-General Bauer;
- Major-General Risse, Commander of the 225th Infantry Division;
- Major-General Hemmann, Commander of the 263rd Infantry Division;
- Major-General Eberth, Commander of the 300th Special Infantry Division;
- Lieutenant-General Menkel, Commander of the 329th Infantry Division;
- Lieutenant-General Neuman, Commander of the 563rd Volksgrenadier Division;
- Major-General Otto Barth, Commander of a combat group of the 21st Luftwaffe Field Division;
- Lieutenant-General Band, Commander of the Courland Fortified Area;
- SS-Gruppenführer Streckenbach, Commander of the 19th Latvian Division;
- Major-General Horst von Usedom, Commander of the 12th Panzer Division;
- Colonel Karl-Max Gräßel, Commander of the 14th Panzer Division;
- Major-General Muller, commandant of the city of Libava.

== See also ==
- List of World War II military units of Germany

== Sources ==
- May 09th 1945 (From the Soviet Information Bureau) part of the Russian News and Information Agency Novosti 60 anniversary of surrender project
- Dollinger, Hans. The Decline and Fall of Nazi Germany and Imperial Japan, LCCN 67--27047
- Tessin, Georg (1980). Die Landstreitkräfte: Namensverbände / Die Luftstreitkräfte (Fliegende Verbände) / Flakeinsatz im Reich 1943–1945 [Ground forces: Named units and formations / Air forces (Flying units and formations) / Anti–aircraft service in the Reich 1943–1945] (in German). Vol. 14. Osnabrück: Biblio. ISBN 3-7648-1111-0.
- Willmott, H.P. et al. World War II, Dorling Kindersley Publishers Ltd, 2004
