= Courland Pocket =

Encirclement of Axis forces in the Baltic region

Battles of the Courland Bridgehead
- Part of the Eastern Front of World War II
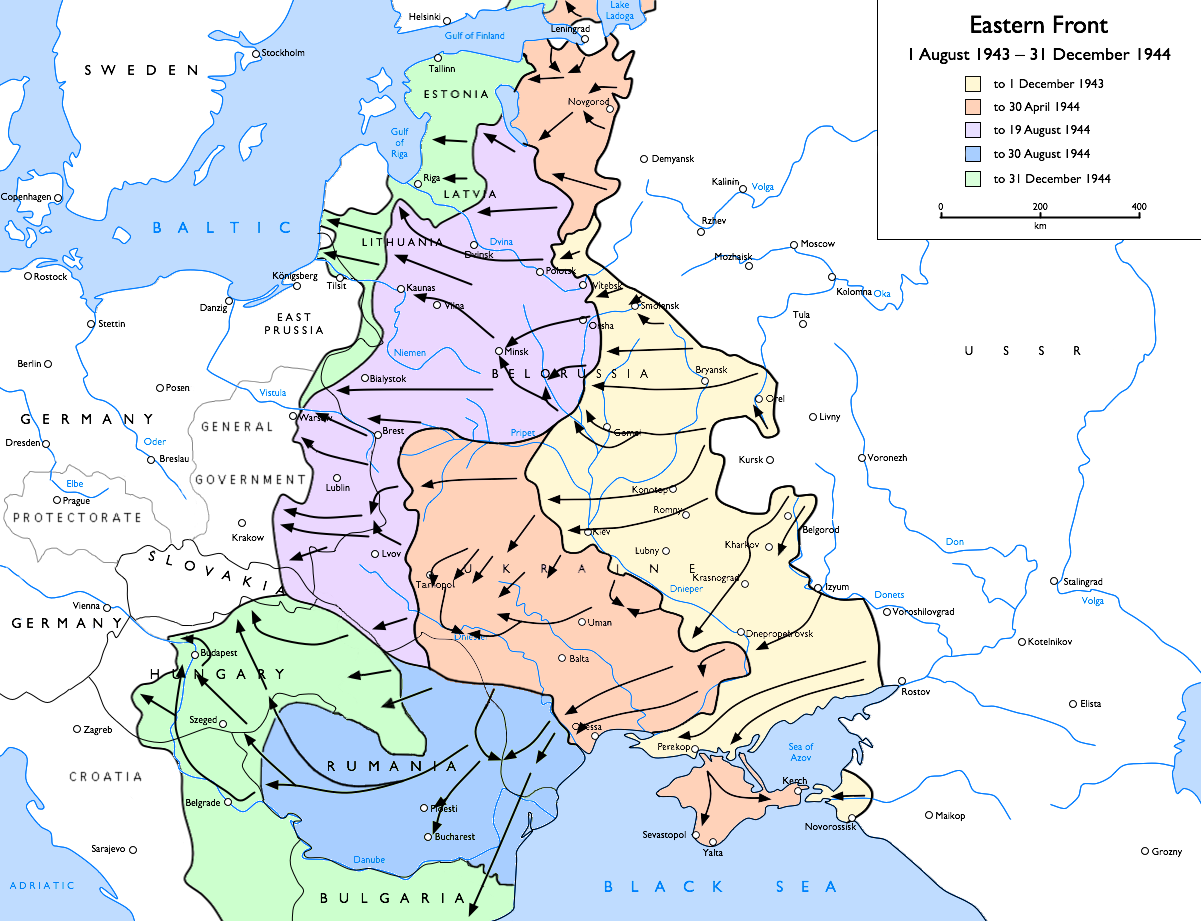
- Soviet advances from 1 September 1943 – 31 December 1944, the Courland Pocket is the white area west of the Gulf of Riga
Date	9 October 1944 – 22 May 1945
Location	Courland Peninsula, Latvia 57°0′0″N 22°0′0″E
Result	Free German/Soviet victory

Belligerents
(Nazi Germany) Germany	Soviet Union; Free Germany (Latvia) Kurelis group

Commanders and leaders
Ferdinand Schörner; Lothar Rendulic; Heinrich von Vietinghoff; Carl Hilpert; Walter Krüger	Ivan Bagramyan; Andrey Yeryomenko; Leonid Govorov

Units involved
Army Group North (prior to 25/01/1945); Army Group Courland (from 25/01/1945 onwards until surrender)	1st Baltic Front; 2nd Baltic Front

Casualties and losses
October 1944–8 May 1945; 117,871 combat casualties (39,537 in February–March 1945); 189,112 captured on 9 May 1945	16 Feb – 8 May 1945; 30,501 killed, 130,447 wounded or sick Total: 160,948

The Courland Pocket (Note: Russian: блокада Курляндской группировки войск, lit. 'Blockade of the Courland Army Group', Kurland-Kessel/German: Kurland-Brückenkopf, lit. 'Courland Bridgehead', Latvian: Kurzemes katls, lit. 'Courland Cauldron' or Kurzemes cietoksnis, lit. Courland Fortress.) was a pocket located on the Courland Peninsula in Latvia on the Eastern Front of World War II from 9 October 1944 to 22 May 1945. The last battle with a regular German army unit took place here on 22 May 1945.

Army Group North of the Wehrmacht were surrounded in western Latvia by the Red Army after the Baltic Offensive, when forces of the 1st Baltic Front reached the Baltic Sea near Memel (Klaipėda) after the collapse of Army Group Centre during Operation Bagration. Army Group North retreated to the Courland Pocket and was renamed Army Group Courland on 25 January, holding off six Red Army offensives until the German Instrument of Surrender was signed on 8 May 1945. Army Group Courland were in a communication "blackout" and did not get the official order until 10 May, becoming one of the last German groups to surrender in Europe.

== Background ==
In June 1941, Nazi Germany launched Operation Barbarossa, the invasion of the Soviet Union, with the goal of reaching the A–A line. The Wehrmacht's Army Group North swept through the Baltic states, which had been occupied by the Soviets since June 1940, en route to capture the city of Leningrad. Army Group North spent most of the next two years attempting to take Leningrad with little success, turning momentum of the war in the north against the Germans. In January 1944, the Soviets lifted the siege of Leningrad, prompting Army Group North to retreat to the Panther Line.

On 22 June 1944, the Red Army launched Operation Bagration with the goal of recapturing the Byelorussian SSR from German occupation. Operation Bagration was extremely successful, resulting in the almost complete destruction of Army Group Centre by late August. This exposed Army Group North at the Panther Line to the north and forced them to retreat back through the Baltic states. Soviet forces would strike deep towards the Baltic Sea coast in the Kaunas and Šiauliai Offensives, severing communications between the Army Group North and the remnants of Army Group Centre. After Operation Bagration ended, the Soviet forces continued the clearing of the Baltic coast, despite German attempts to restore the front in Operation Doppelkopf. The Red Army fought the Memel Offensive Operation with the goal of isolating Army Group North by capturing the city of Memel (Klaipėda).

== Battles of the Courland Bridgehead ==
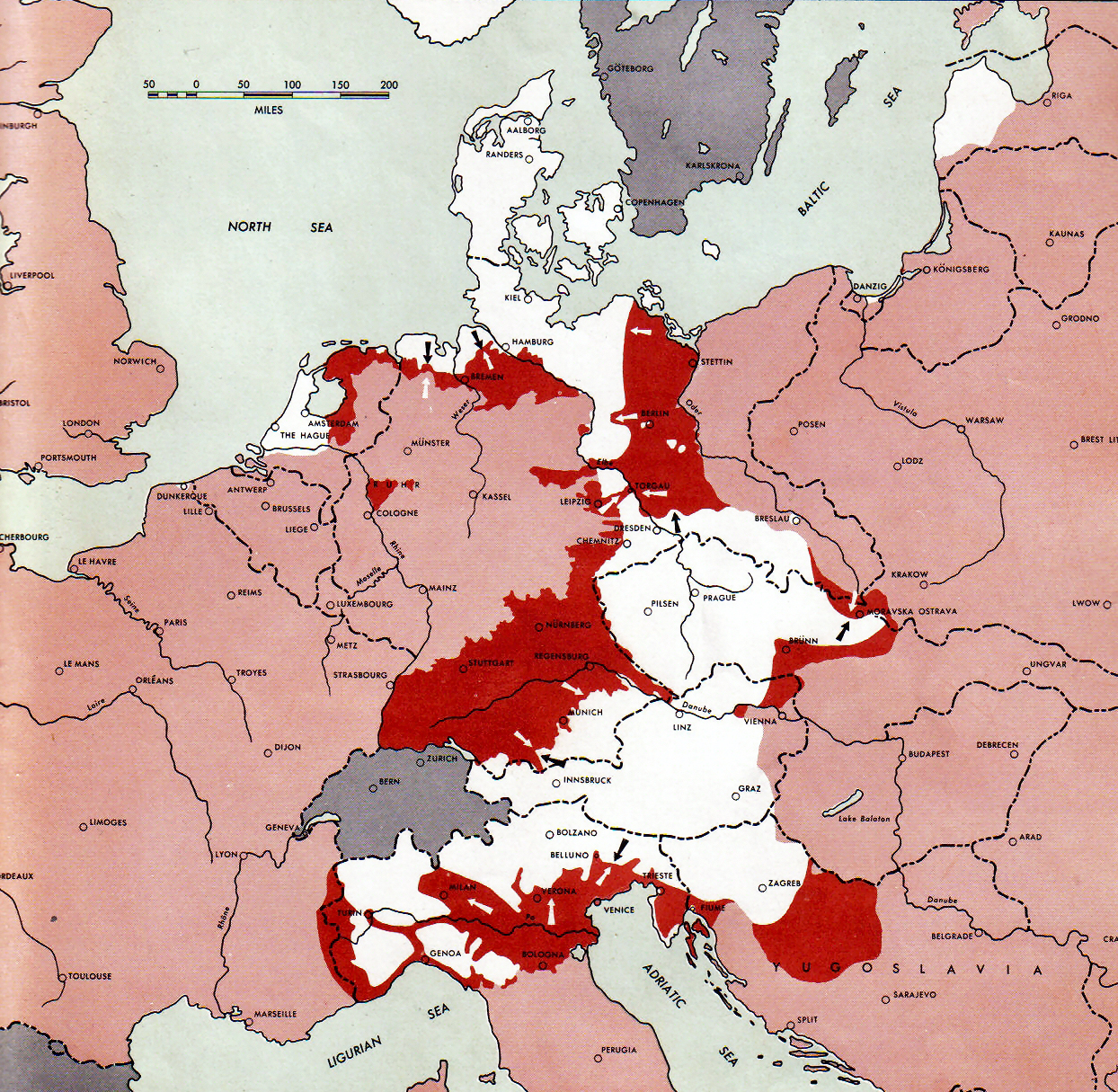
Front lines 1 May 1945 (pink = allied occupied territory; red = area of fighting. The Courland Pocket can be seen on the upper right of this map, cut off from the general fighting in central Germany

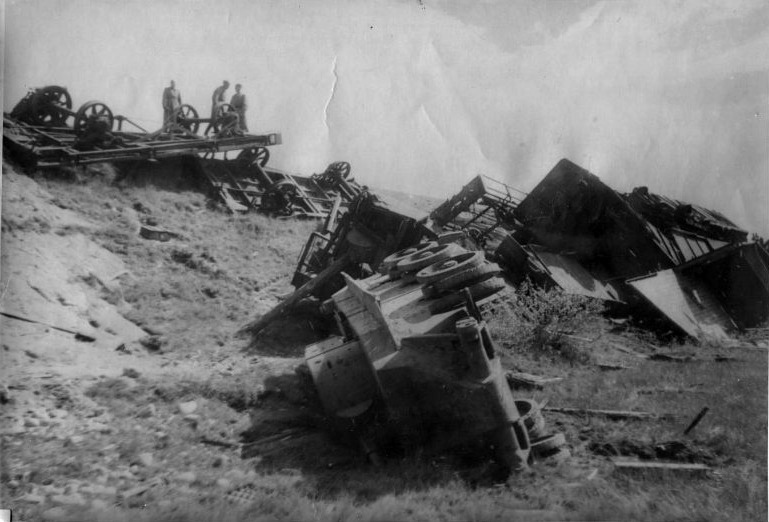
Destroyed German equipment between Riga and Tukums

On 9 October 1944, the Red Army reached the Baltic Sea near Memel after overrunning the headquarters of the 3rd Panzer Army. As a result, Army Group North was trapped in western Latvia when the Soviets cut them off from East Prussia, and by extension the rest of the German forces. A pocket was formed from Tukums and Liepāja, with the Baltic Sea in the west, the Irbe Strait in the north, and the Gulf of Riga in the east. Adolf Hitler's military advisors — notably Heinz Guderian, the Chief of the German General Staff — urged an evacuation and utilisation of the troops in Courland to stabilise the front in Central Europe. However, Hitler refused, and ordered the German forces in Courland and the Estonian islands Hiiumaa (Dagö) and Saaremaa (Ösel) to hold out, believing them necessary to protect German submarine bases along the Baltic coast. Hitler still believed the war could be won, and hoped that Admiral Karl Dönitz's new Type XXI U-boat technology could bring victory to Germany in the Battle of the Atlantic, forcing the Allies out of Western Europe. This would allow German forces to focus on the Eastern Front, using the pocket as a bridgehead for a new offensive. Hitler's refusal to evacuate the Army Group North resulted in the entrenchment of more than 200,000 German troops, largely of the 16th Army and 18th Army, in western Latvia. Thirty-three divisions of the Army Group North, commanded by Feldmarschall Ferdinand Schörner, were cut off from East Prussia and spread out along a front reaching from Riga to Liepāja, retreating to the more defensible position on the Courland Peninsula, abandoning Riga.

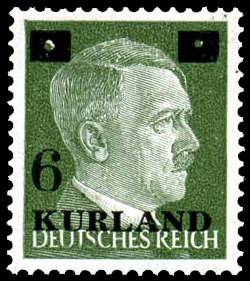
Stamp used in Courland pocket (1945)

Soviet forces launched six major offensives against the German and Latvian forces entrenched in the Courland Pocket between 15 October 1944 and 4 April 1945. The German two-phase withdrawals during the execution of the second stage of the Soviet Baltic Offensive (14 September – 24 November 1944), subsequent to the pocket being formed in the Baltic Offensive's first stage, the Memel Offensive Operation.

=== Timeline ===
From 15 to 22 October 1944 – Soviets launched the Riga Offensive Operation on the 15th at 10:00 after conducting a heavy artillery barrage. Hitler permitted Schörner to commence withdrawal from Riga on 11 October, and the city was taken by the 3rd Baltic Front on 13 October. The front stabilised with the main remnant of Army Group North isolated in the peninsula.

From 27 October to 25 November – Soviets launched an offensive trying to break through the front toward Skrunda and Saldus including at one point initiating a simultaneous attack by 52 divisions. Soviet forces also attacked southeast of Liepāja in an attempt to capture that port. 80 divisions assaulted the Germans from 1 to 15 November in a front 12 km wide. The Soviet breakthrough stalled after roughly 4 kilometers.

The third phase of the fighting (also known as "the other Christmas Battle") started on 21 December with a Soviet attack on Germans near Saldus. The Soviet 2nd Baltic (northern sector) and 1st Baltic Fronts (southern sector) commenced a blockade, precipitating the German defence of the Courland perimeter during Soviet attempts to reduce it. In this battle, serving with the 2nd Baltic Front's 22nd Army, the Latvian 130th Rifle Corps faced their opposites in the Latvian 19th SS Division. The battle ended on 31 December and the front was stabilized.

On 25 January 1945, Army Group North was renamed Army Group Courland under Colonel-General Lothar Rendulic, while Schörner was transferred to Army Group Centre. In the middle of January, Guderian got Hitler's permission to withdraw seven divisions from Courland, however, Hitler refused to consider a total withdrawal. The 4th Panzer Division, 31st, 32nd, 93rd Infantry Divisions, 11th SS Division Nordland and the remnants of the battered 227th, 218th and 389th Infantry Divisions and 15th Latvian SS-Division were evacuated over the sea. On 23 January, Soviet forces launched an offensive trying to break through the front toward Liepāja and Saldus. They managed to take the bridgeheads on Bārta and Vārtāja rivers, but were once prevented from a break through by the Germans.

The fifth battle started on 12 February with a Soviet attack against the Germans towards Džūkste. Other attacks took place south of Liepāja where the Soviets massed 21 divisions, and south of Tukums where 11 divisions tried to break through the German front and take the town. On 16 February, the Soviets started an offensive against the 19th Division.

=== Surrender ===
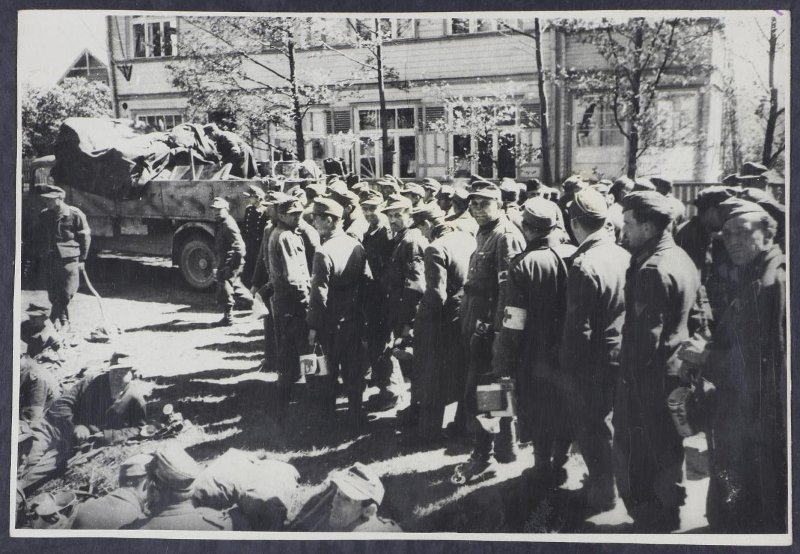
German prisoners of war after the surrender, May 1945

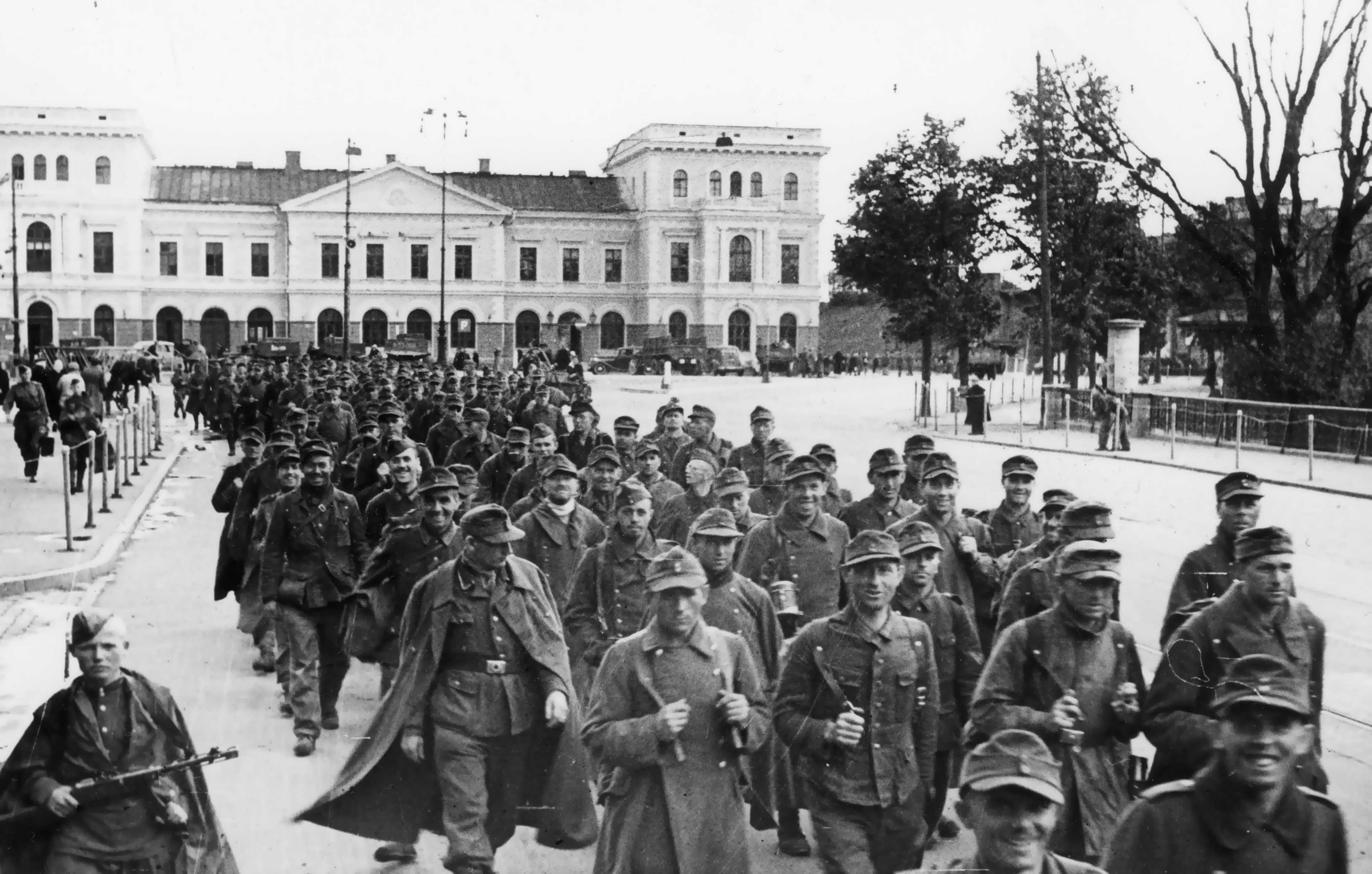
German prisoners of the war captured in the pocket being marched through Riga, May 1945

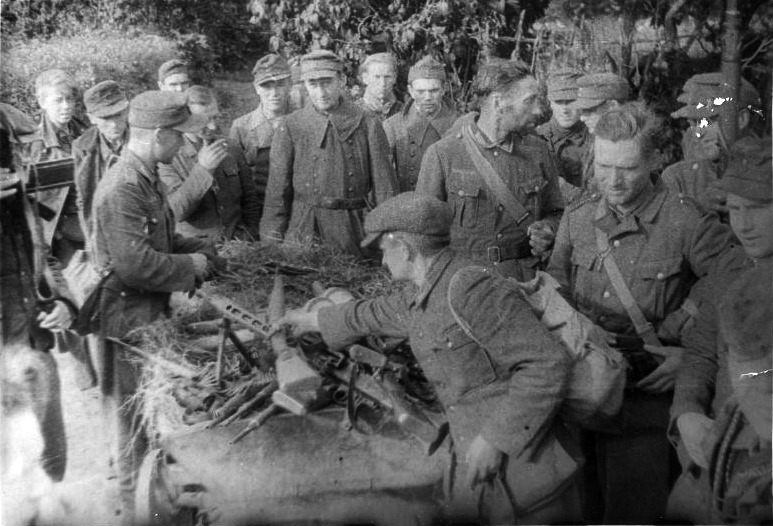
Surrendering German troops hand over their weapons

On 8 May, the German Instrument of Surrender was signed, officially ending World War II in Europe. Dönitz, now the Head of State and President of Germany, ordered Colonel-General Carl Hilpert – the Army Group Courland's last commander – to surrender. However, German forces in the Courland Pocket had their communications severed, and the "blackout" meant they did not receive their orders until 10 May, two days after the war had ended. General Otto Friedrich Rauser succeeded in obtaining better surrender terms from the Soviet command. Hilpert, his personal staff, and staffs of three Armies surrendered to Marshal Leonid Govorov, the commander of the Leningrad Front. At this time, the group still consisted of the remnants of 27 divisions and one brigade. As a result, Army Group Courland became one of the final major German formations to surrender.

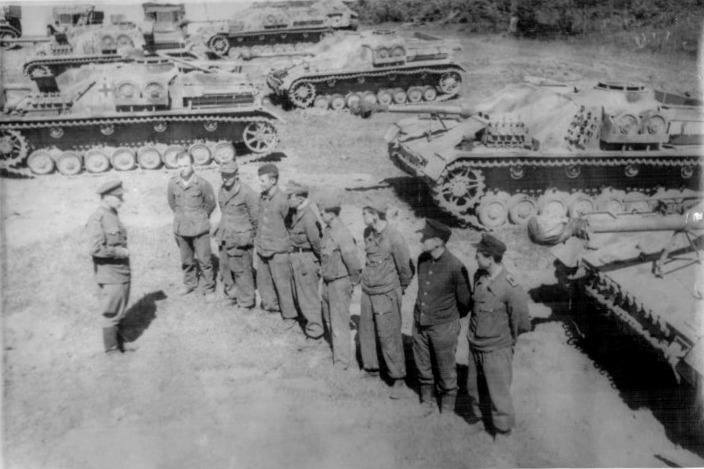
A Red Army officer accepts surrendered Sturmgeschütz IV assault guns.

On 9 May, the Soviet commission in Peilei started to interrogate the captive staff of Army Group Courland, and general collection of prisoners began.

By 12 May, approximately 135,000 German troops surrendered in the Courland Pocket. On 23 May, the Soviet collection of the German troops in the Courland Pocket was completed. A total of about 180,000 German troops were taken into captivity from the Baltic area. The bulk of the German prisoners of war in the Soviet Union were initially held at the Valdai Hills camps.

== German Order of Battle (March 1945) ==
Army Group North (to 25 January 1945)
Army Group Courland (25 January 1945 to 8 May 1945)
Generaloberst Heinrich von Vietinghoff – from 10 March 1945 Generaloberst Lothar Rendulic – from 25 March 1945 Generaloberst Carl Hilpert

=== German 16th Army ===
General der Infanterie Carl Hilpert – from 10 March 1945 General der Infanterie Ernst-Anton von Krosigk (KIA) – from 16 March General der Gebirgstruppen Friedrich-Jobst Volckamer von Kirchensittenbach

- XVI. Armeekorps – Generalleutnant Ernst-Anton von Krosigk – from 10 March Generalleutnant Gottfried Weber
  - 81. Infanterie-Division – Generalleutnant Franz Eccard von Bentivegni
  - 300. Infanterie-Division z. b. V. – Generalmajor Anton Eberth
  - 21. Luftwaffen-Feld-Division (Only Staff) – Generalleutnant Albert Henze, 16 February 1945 Generalmajor Otto Barth
- VI. SS-Armeekorps – SS-Obergruppenführer Walter Krüger
  - 24. Infanterie-Division – Generalmajor Harald Schultz
  - 12. Panzer-Division – Generalleutnant Erpo von Bodenhausen, from 14 April 1945 Generalmajor Horst von Usedom
  - 19. SS-Grenadier-Division – SS-Gruppenführer und Generalleutnant der Waffen-SS Bruno Streckenbach
- XXXVIII. Armeekorps – General der Artillerie Kurt Herzog
  - 122. Infanterie-Division – General der Infanterie Friedrich Fangohr, from 20 January 1945 Generalmajor Bruno Schatz
  - 290. Infanterie-Division – Generalmajor Hans-Joachim Baurmeister, from 25 April 1945 Generalmajor Carl Henke, from 27 April 1945 Generalleutnant Bruno Ortler
  - 329. Infanterie-Division – Generalleutnant Konrad Menkel, from 1 January 1945 Generalmajor Werner Schulze

=== German 18th Army ===
General der Infanterie Ehrenfried Boege

- I. Armeekorps – General der Infanterie Friedrich Fangohr, from 21 April 1945 Generalleutnant Christian Usinger
  - 218. Infanterie-Division – Generalleutnant Viktor Lang, from 25 December 1944 Generalmajor Ingo von Collani, from 1 May 1945 Generalleutnant Werner Ranck
  - 132. Infanterie-Division – Generalleutnant Herbert Wagner, from 8 January 1945 Generalmajor Rudolf Demme
- II. Armeekorps – General der Infanterie Johannes Mayer, from 1 April 1945 Generalleutnant Alfred Gause
  - 263. Infanterie-Division – Generalleutnant Alfred Hemmann
  - 563. Volksgrenadier-Division – Generalmajor Ferdinand Brühl, from 25 February 1945 Generalmajor Werner Neumann
- X. Armeekorps – General der Artillerie Siegfried Thomaschki
  - 87. Infanterie-Division – Generalmajor Helmuth Walter, from 16 January 1945 Generalleutnant Mauritz Freiherr von Strachwitz
  - 126. Infanterie-Division – Generalmajor/Generalleutnant Gotthard Fischer, from 5 January 1945 Oberst/Generalmajor Kurt Hähling
  - 30. Infanterie-Division – Generalmajor Otto Barth, from 30 January 1945 Generalleutnant Albert Henze
- L. Armeekorps – General der Gebirgstruppe Friedrich Jobst Volckamer von Kirchensittenbach, from 11 April 1945 Generalleutnant Erpo von Bodenhausen
  - 205. Infanterie-Division – Generalmajor Ernst Biehler, from 15 November 1944 Generalmajor Karl-Hans Giese
  - 225. Infanterie-Division – Generalleutnant Walter Risse
  - 11. Infanterie-Division – Generalleutnant Hellmuth Reymann, from 18 November 1944 Generalleutnant Gerhard Feyerabend
  - 14. Panzer-Division – Generalmajor Oskar Munzel, from 25 November 1944 Generalmajor Martin Unrein, from 19 February 1945 Oberst Friedrich-Wilhelm Jürgen, from 22 March 1945 Oberst Paul Lüneburg, from 25 March 1945 Oberst Karl-Max Gräßel

Security Divisions

- 52nd Security Division : Festung Libau – Generalleutnant Albrecht Digeon von Monteton
- 201st Security Division (Disbanded in January 1945) – Generalmajor Anton Eberth
- 207th Security Division (Only Staff)

Luftwaffe

- Jagdgeschwader 54 – Oberst Dietrich Hrabak

Marine

- 9. Marine-Sicherungsdivision
- 1. Minensuchflottille
- 3. Minensuchflottille
- 25. Minensuchflottille
- 31. Minensuchflottille
- 1. Räumbootsflottille – Kapitänleutnant Carl Hoff
- 17. Räumbootsflottille
- 3. Vorpostenflottille
- 9. Vorpostenflottille
- 17. Vorpostenflottille
- 3. Sicherungsflottille
- 14. Sicherungsflottille
- 13. Landungsflottille
- 21. Landungsflottille
- 24. Landungsflottille
- 3. U-Jagdflottille
- 11. U-Jagdflottille
- 1. Schnellboot-Schulflottille
- 2. Schnellboot-Schulflottille
- 3. Schnellboot-Schulflottille

== Soviet Order of Battle ==
=== Leningrad Front ===
(Army General Leonid Govorov) 1 May 1945

- 51st Army (Army General Yakov Kreizer)
  - 1st Guards Rifle Corps (53rd Guards, 204th, 267th Rifle Divisions)
  - 10th Rifle Corps (91st, 279th, 347th Rifle Divisions),
  - 63rd Rifle Corps (77th, 87th, 417th Rifle Divisions)
- 6th Guards Army (Colonel General Ivan Chistyakov)
  - 2nd (9th Guards, 71st Guards, and 166th Rifle Divisions),
  - 22nd (46th Guards Rifle, 16th Lithuanian, and 29th Rifle Divisions), and
  - 30th Guards Rifle Corps (45th Guards, 63rd Guards, and 64th Guards Rifle Divisions)
- 4th Shock Army (Army General Pyotr Malyshev)
  - 84 Corp (164, 270 infantry division)
  - 92 Corp (156, 179, 257 infantry division),
  - 32 infantry division
- 42nd Army (Lieutenant General Vladimir Petrovich Sviridov)
  - 14 Rifle Corps (11, 288 infantry division),
  - 122 Rifle Corps (56, 85 infantry division),
  - 130th Latvian Rifle Corps (43 Guards,308 Latvian Rifle Division),
  - 118 Fortified Region
- 1st Shock Army (Lieutenant General Vladimir N. Razuvaev)
  - 1 Corp (306, 344, 357 infantry division)
  - 8 Estonian. Corp (7, 249 Estonian infantry division)
  - 119 Corp (201, 360, 374 infantry division)
  - 123 Corp (21 guards, 376 infantry division)
  - 6 Guards, 20 Breakthrough Artillery division
- 10th Guards Army (Lieutenant General Mikhail Kazakov)
  - 7 Guards Corp (7, 8 и 119 Guards division),
  - 15 Guards Corp (29, 30 и 85 Guards division),
  - 19 Guards Corp (22, 56 и 65 Guards, 198 infantry division)
- 15th Air Army

=== Front Reserves ===
- 8 Guards Rocket Artillery Division (26, 27, 28 Guards Rocket Brigade)
- 21, 28 Artillery Divisions
- 3rd Guards Tank Corp

== Historiography ==
=== Soviet and Russian accounts ===
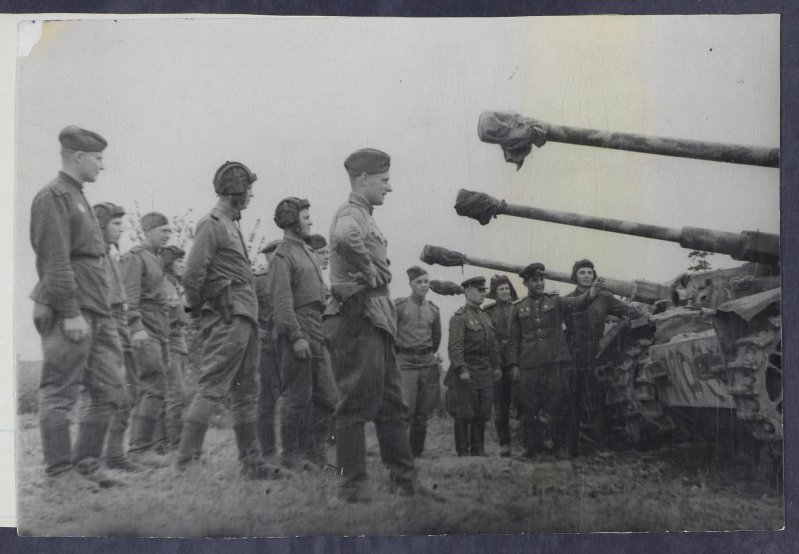
Soviet tankers examine captured German tanks at Stende, May 1945

The First Courland Battle was intended to destroy German forces. After that failure, official Soviet accounts ignore Courland, stating only that the Soviet goal was to prevent the Germans from escaping.

In this account, the Soviet actions in Courland were defensive blocking operations. Hostilities consisted of containing German breakout attempts, and the Red Army made no concerted effort to capture the Courland Pocket, which was of little strategic importance after the isolation of Army Group North, whereas the main offensive effort was required for the Vistula-Oder and Berlin Offensives. Soviet forces suffered correspondingly low casualties. The modern research of Grigoriy Krivosheev indicates a total of 160,948 Soviet casualties between 16 February and 8 May 1945": 30,501 "irrecoverable" and 130,447 "medical" losses.

According to the Russian historian Aleksei Isaev, Courland was a peripheral front for both the Soviets and Germans. The Soviet goal was to prevent the German troops there from being transported by sea to reinforce the defense of Berlin. Soviet operations intended to further isolate and also destroy the enemy, but the strength of the attacking troops was too low to make any significant progress in the difficult terrain. The Soviet commanders worked competently and as a result the reported casualties were low.

=== Western sources ===
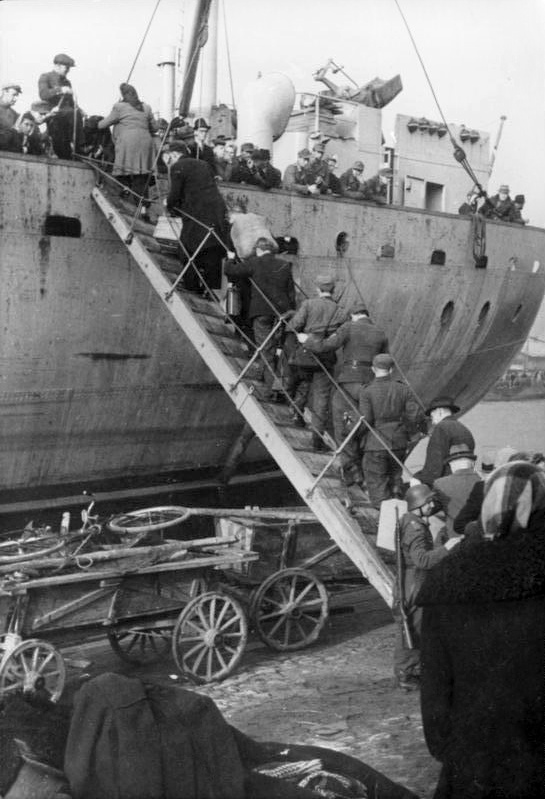
Evacuation at Ventspils (Windau), 19 October 1944

Joseph Stalin had initially been intent on destroying the German forces in Courland, reporting in September 1944 that he was "mopping up" in the Baltics, and in November, that the Germans were "now being hammered to a finish." As late as March 1945, Stalin was still making claims that German forces in Courland would soon be defeated. This victory was necessary, in Stalin's eyes, to re-establish Soviet control over its 1941 frontiers following the annexation of the Baltic states.

The Soviets launched six offensives to defeat Army Group Courland. Throughout the campaign against the Courland pocket, Soviet forces did not advance more than 25 miles anywhere along the front, ending no more than a few kilometers forward of their original positions after seven months of conflict. The Soviet operations were hampered by the difficult terrain and bad weather.

Army Group Courland reported inflicting heavy losses on the Soviets. However, in the absence of heavy weaponry and a near total lack of air support, total German casualties in Courland were heavy as well, and estimated to be over 150,000.

According to Robert Forczyk, the Battle of Courland was very costly for the Soviets, who lost over 1,000 tanks there.

The withdrawal of Soviet units starting from December 1944 indicates that the Soviet command did not consider Courland to be as important as other sectors of the Eastern Front. Destroying the German forces there was not worth the effort and the goal was now to keep them from breaking out. The next three offensives were most likely intended to prevent the evacuation of German troops by sea. By the start of April 1945, the Soviets viewed the German forces in Courland as not much more than self-supporting prisoners.

== Aftermath ==
On 9 May 1945, General Ivan Bagramyan accepted the surrender of German forces at Ezere Manor in southwest Latvia. According to Russian records, 146,000 German and Latvian troops were taken prisoner, including 28 generals and 5,083 officers, and taken to camps in the Soviet interior and imprisoned for years. Current scholarship puts the count of those surrendering at about 190,000: 189,112 Germans including 42 generals — among them Hilpert, who was executed for war crimes after trial in Soviet captivity in 1947 — and approximately 14,000 Latvians. The Soviets detained all males between the ages of 16 and 60, and conducted widespread deforestation campaigns, burning tracts of forest to flush out resisters.

== See also ==
- Operation Hannibal

== Literature ==
- Dallas, Gregor. (2006). 1945: The War That Never Ended. Yale: Yale University Press. ISBN 0-300-10980-6.
- Frieser, Karl-Heinz; Schmider, Klaus; Schönherr, Klaus; Schreiber, Gerhard; Ungváry, Kristián; Wegner, Bernd (2007). Die Ostfront 1943/44 – Der Krieg im Osten und an den Nebenfronten [The Eastern Front 1943–1944: The War in the East and on the Neighbouring Fronts]. Das Deutsche Reich und der Zweite Weltkrieg [Germany and the Second World War] (in German). Vol. VIII. München: Deutsche Verlags-Anstalt. ISBN 978-3-421-06235-2.
- Wade, Richard (2015). The Survivors of the Kurland Pocket 1944–1945. Charlestown, West Virginia: American Military University.
