= 278th Division =

278th Division may refer to:

- 278th Infantry Division, Wehrmacht, Germany
- 278th Rifle Division, Soviet Union

== See also ==
- List of military divisions by number
