= Ezere Manor =

Manor in Latvia

- Courland, Latvia
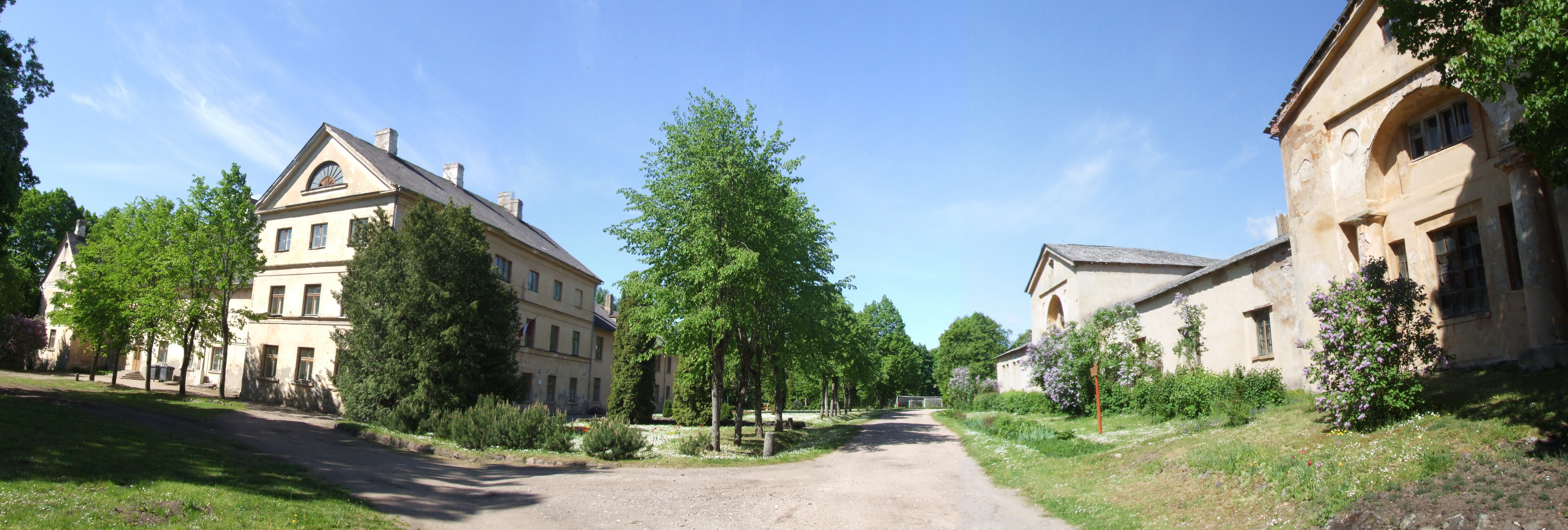

Site information
- Type: Manor

Location
- Coordinates: 56.4039°N 22.3616°E

Site history
- Built: 1750

Ezere Manor (Latvian: Ezeres muižas pils, German: Gut Gross-Essern), also called Lielezere Manor, is a manor house in the Ezere Parish of Saldus Municipality in the Courland region of Latvia, near the border with Lithuania. Ezere Manor house, constructed in 18th-19th centuries, is an architectural monument of national importance.

== History ==
Original Ezere manor house (Lielezer Manor; Groß-Essern; Essern) was built in 1750s by von Bernewitz noble family. Later, it has been remodeled several times by a series of owners. Since 1922, the building has housed the Ezere school. It was a 6-year primary school at that time. Capitulation of Army Group Courland was accepted here by Soviet General Ivan Bagramyan on 9 May 1945.

Since 1952, manor house has been operating as an Ezere secondary school. In 1963, the school was expanded to include a primary school, a music class and a gym.

As of September 1, 2016, by the decision of the meeting of the deputies of Saldus District Council on February 25, the Ezere Secondary School was reorganized into an elementary school.

== See also ==
- List of palaces and manor houses in Latvia
