= Gotthard Fischer =

German general (1891–1969)

- Born: 10 January 1891; Goldap
- Died: 27 July 1969 (aged 78); Flensburg
- Military career
- Allegiance: German Empire; Weimar Republic; Nazi Germany
- Branch: Army
- Service years: 1909–1920; 1933–1945
- Rank: Generalleutnant
- Commands: 126. Infanterie-Division
- Conflicts: World War II: Courland Pocket (surrendered)
- Awards: Knight's Cross of the Iron Cross

Gotthard Fischer (10 January 1891 – 27 July 1969) was a German general (Generalleutnant) in the Wehrmacht during World War II who commanded several divisions. He was a recipient of the Knight's Cross of the Iron Cross of Nazi Germany.

Fischer surrendered to the Red Army in April 1945 in the Courland Pocket. Convicted as a war criminal in the Soviet Union, he was held until 1955.

== Awards ==
- Knight's Cross of the Iron Cross on 7 February 1944 as Oberst and commander of 126. Infanterie-Division

Military offices
Preceded by Generalleutnant Harry Hoppe	Commander of 126. Infanterie-Division; 7 November 1943 – 5 January 1945	Succeeded by Generalmajor Kurt Haehling
