= 225th Infantry Division (Wehrmacht) =

- 225. Infanterie-Division
- Division insignia
- Active: August 1939 - April 1945
- Country: Nazi Germany
- Branch: Heer (Wehrmacht)
- Type: Infantry
- Size: Division
- Engagements: World War II: Invasion of Poland; Battle of France; Battle of Moscow; Siege of Leningrad; Battle of Demyansk

The 225th Infantry Division (German: 225. Infanterie-Division) was an infantry division of the German Heer during World War II.

== Operational history ==
The division was formed on 26 August 1939 as part of the third Aufstellungswelle in the Hamburg area of Wehrkreis X. It initially consisted of Artillery Regiment 225 as well as the Infantry Regiments 333 (Hamburg), 376 (Lübeck) and 377 (Bremen). The division was formed from Landwehr personnel from the regiments' areas. The division's initial commander was Ernst Schaumburg.

The 225th Infantry Division was sent to Aachen and used for border guard duty while the bulk of German forces focussed on the Invasion of Poland. The second battalion of Regiment 377 was given to the 555th Infantry Division on 29 January 1940. After the German victory in Poland, the 225th Infantry Division saw action in the western campaign, specifically in the invasion of the Netherlands. The division took part in the drive on Amsterdam. In late May, the 225th Division was involved in combat in Belgium, during the fighting along the Lys. On 25 May 1940, soldiers of the 377th Regiment carried out the Vinkt Massacre, taking 140 Belgian civilians hostage and using them as human shields, resulting in dozens of deaths. On May 27th, frustrated by the Belgian Chasseurs Ardennais' refusal to surrender and believing they had been fired on by local partisans, the German soldiers began to execute their civilian hostages, only four survived. The massacre is one of many warcrimes of the Wehrmacht carried out during the 1940 campaign. After the German victory in the west, the 225th Infantry Division remained on occupation duty until the end of 1941. The Artillery Regiment 225 joined 215th Infantry Division on 16 November 1941.

In January 1942, it became one of the division that was quickly redeployed to the Eastern Front in response to the Soviet victory at the Battle of Moscow. The division became part of Army Group North and remained under this army group for the rest of the war, with a brief exception in July 1944, when the division was attached to Army Group Centre before being transferred back to Army Group North. The 225th Infantry Division saw action in the Soviet winter offensives of 1941/42 and 1942/43, took part in the Siege of Leningrad, participated in the Battle of Demyansk from November 1942 to February 1943, and fought at Lake Ilmen between March and May 1942. At that time, the 333rd Grenadier Regiment (formerly Infantry Regiment 333 (Hamburg)) fought at the Oranienbaum Bridgehead, where it sustained massive casualties (448 dead, 1050 wounded, 89 missing) between 1 May and 15 June 1942. As a result of these irrecoverable losses, the 333rd Regiment was disbanded in January 1943. On 20 February 1944, the 225th Infantry Division absorbed most of the remnants of the 9th Luftwaffe Field Division. Over the course of the year 1944, the 225th Infantry Division was part of the German retreat through the Baltic. The division was trapped in the Courland Pocket in October 1944 and eventually surrendered to Soviet forces in April 1945.

== Noteworthy individuals ==
- Ernst Schaumburg, divisional commander starting 26 August 1939.
- Friedrich-Karl von Wachter, divisional commander starting 1 July 1940.
- Hans von Basse, divisional commander starting 1 June 1941.
- Ernst-Walther Risse, divisional commander starting 25 September 1942.

== Legacy ==
A memorial for the fallen soldiers of the 225th Infantry Division was erected in 1959 in Hamburg-Dammtor.
