= 218th Infantry Division (Wehrmacht) =

- 218. Infanterie-Division
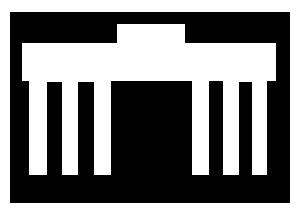
- Unit insignia of the 218th Infantry Division
- Active: August 1939 – May 1945
- Country: Nazi Germany
- Branch: Army
- Type: Infantry
- Size: Division
- Engagements: Invasion of Poland; Western campaign Kholm Pocket; Courland Pocket

The 218th Infantry Division (218.Infanterie-Division) was an infantry division of the German Army that served in World War II.

The 218th Infantry served in the invasion of Poland as a reserve division for the 4th Army. Subsequently, it was moved to the west facing the Maginot line, which it attacked in May 1940 as part of the 7th Army. Following a period of occupation duty and also briefly a return to civilian life, its soldiers were sent to the Eastern Front in the winter of 1941. It remained on the Eastern Front until the end of the war, retreating with Army Group North back through the Baltic states, until the Army group was trapped in Courland, where the division surrendered to the Soviets on 8 May 1945.

== Combat History ==
The 218th Infantry division saw its first action in the German invasion of Poland. On 1 September it was Army reserve for the 4th Army stationed in Pomerania in northern Germany. It crossed into Poland, into the corridor which had given Poland access to the Baltic sea, and towards the River Vistula and the border with East Prussia. The division advanced behind the main fighting front and saw little fighting in the campaign.

=== France 1940 ===
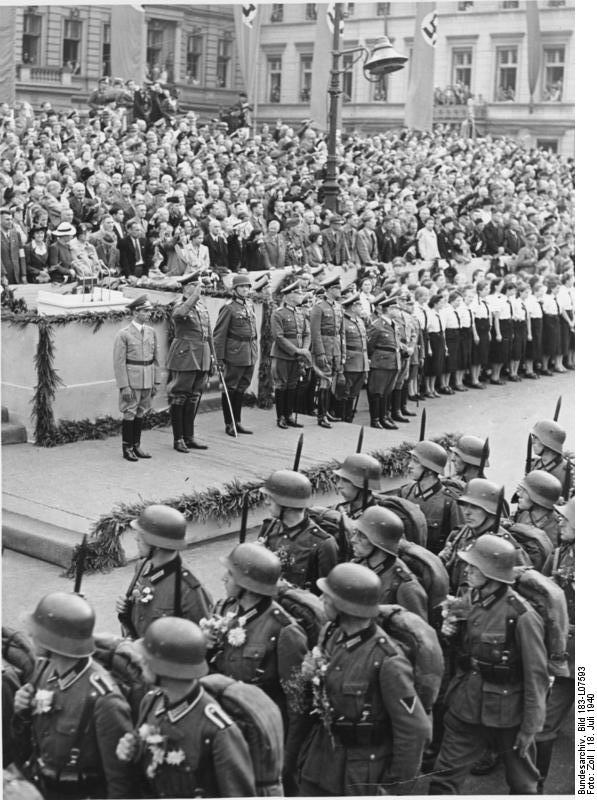
Soldiers from the 218th division on parade past Joseph Goebbels and Generaloberst Friedrich Fromm after the Battle of France.

In May 1940, the division was moved to the Western Front, assigned to the reserve of 7th Army. On 15 June 1940 218 Infantry Division became one of 5 Infantry divisions committed by 7th Army in Operation Kleiner Bär, a crossing of the Rhine in the Colmar area. They were to cross the river and attack a portion of the Maginot line defended by 3 French fortress divisions. The 218th attack at Schoenau, led by Infantry Regiment 397, was held up by French fortifications which although damaged by the artillery preparation were not put out of action and forced the Regimental commander to suspend the river crossing in the face of mounting casualties. The divisions 386 Regiment had more success. Crossing the Rhine in an area of fewer fortifications, the regiments assault teams captured the French forward line and several casements, and by noon were engaging the French rearward defensive lines. The following day, with the assistance of further artillery, Stuka dive bomber strikes, the 218th was able to pierce the French defenses, together with 21st and 239th infantry divisions. By 19 June, the division had advanced a further 15 miles into the Vosges Mountains. The French Army was in a state of collapse, as on the previous day, Guderian's Panzer forces had reached the Swiss border, effectively surrounding the French defenders in the Vosges and 3 days later the armistice was signed at Compiègne, marking the end of hostilities.

The division remained in occupation duty in the Alsace region until February 1941, when its soldiers were stood down.

=== Eastern Front ===
Although the beginning of the German-Soviet War (Operation Barbarossa) involved much of the German army, the 218th Infantry Division had initially remained on occupation duty in Denmark. The beginning of the Soviet Winter Offensive 1941/42 in early December 1941 did however cause significant concern among the German leadership, causing Adolf Hitler to order on 15 December 1941 the preparation of the deployment of additional forces to the Eastern Front from various theaters. The 218th Infantry Division was earmarked for replacement by a less well-equipped 'static' (German: bodenständig) occupation force in Denmark so that the core of the division could be used within weeks on the Eastern Front.

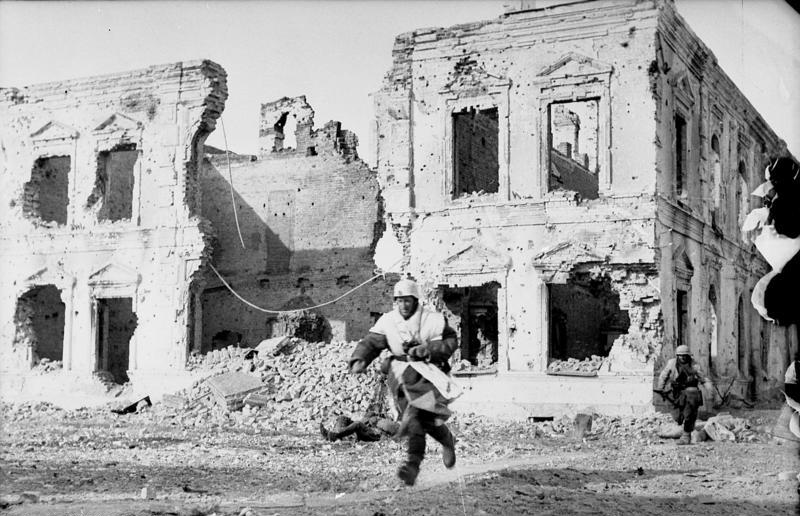
German soldiers in the ruins of Kholm

Whilst en route to Riga, for commitment with Army Group North, Generaloberst Busch, commander of the 16th Army ordered the forward elements of the division rushed into Kholm. Detraining at Loknya, a small stop on the Dno Nevel railway line, but still 50 miles from Kholm, the first battalion to arrive, the I/386, was rushed by all available trucks to Kholm along with a convoy carrying food and ammunition. Oberstleutnant Johannes Manitius, the commander of Infantry Regiment 386, joined his unit in Kholm and another battalion from the Regiment managed slipped past advancing units of the Soviet 3rd Shock Army, before the Soviets threw a solid cordon around the town. The Germans had barely beaten the Soviets to Kholm, and positioned a mixed battlegroup (kampfgruppe) of around 4,500 soldiers under the leadership of Generalmajor Scherer, but the group had virtually no artillery or anti tank guns. By 28 January 1942, the Soviets had closed the ring around the city and drove additional forces from the 218th Division under the divisional commander, Generalmajor Ukermann, back down the road to Loknya, where the remainder of the division was still arriving.

Hitler designated Kholm as a 'Festung' (fortress), which meant the garrison of Kholm would have to hold out until relieved. The remainder of the 218th Infantry Division, joined by a battle group from 8th Panzer Division became the main components of the relief force, known as Groupe Uckermann, which attempted to fight their way back towards Kholm. Meanwhile, the only means of supply, of reinforcements and of replacements for the Kholm garrison was by air transport.

After the success of the relief effort, the 218 took over the defense of the German line at Kholm and remained there for the next 18 months.

In January 1944 the defensive positions around Leningrad of Army Group North collapsed, and Hitler finally authorized a withdrawal to the Panther–Wotan line. With the collapse of Army Group Center to the south meant that the Panther positions were no longer tenable, and the 218th Infantry retreated with the Army group through Estonia to Riga, and then on into Courland.

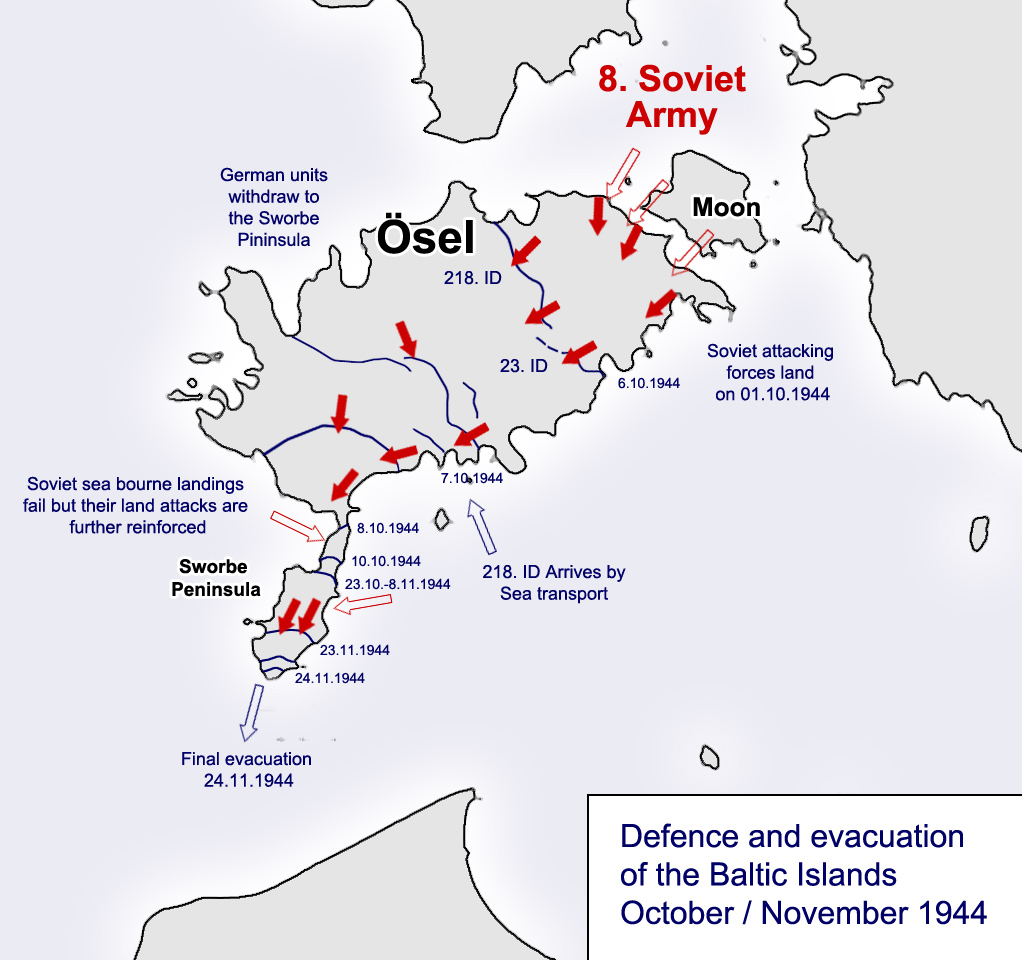
Soviet assault on Baltic island of Saaremaa (Ösel) in October/November 1944

=== On the defensive in the Baltic ===
Upon hearing news of the Finland's armistice with the Soviet Union, Hitler ordered the Baltic Islands to be reinforced

During the Soviet Moonsund Landing Operation, the 23rd Infantry Division was backed by miscellaneous Kriegsmarine and army artillery troops. Its forces were made considerably stronger by the transfer of 12th Luftwaffe Division and 218th Infantry division. The 218th division started to land on the island of Saaremaa (Ösel) on 30 September 1944 and marched north. The Soviet forces were not far behind and landed on the northern shores 5 days later. After some sharp clashes General Schörner, commander of Army Group Courland, ordered a withdrawal to the more defensible Sõrve Peninsula (Sworbe Peninsula.) Soviet forces, numerically superior to the Germans, kept up the pressure in October, forcing the Germans back, but a landing behind the German lines near Vintri failed to displace them.

After a period of calm the Russian forces struck again in mid November, and smashed through the defenses and forced 218th Infantry and other German formations back to the very tip of the peninsula. Against Hitler's orders to hold on to the last man, General Schörner ordered an evacuation. Reduced to battle group strength, the 218th was nevertheless soon returned to the front line in Courland.

The 218th remained in Courland for the final months of the war, finally surrendering to the Soviet Army near Tuckum.

== Organisation ==
The 218th Infantry division was formed in the 3rd wave of mobilization in August 1939, using older men of the local defence forces, Landwehr. The divisions of the 3rd wave were designed for occupation duties and were equipped with captured weapons and vehicles. Its home station was military district 3, around Berlin, and on formation its composition was,

- 323rd Infantry Regiment (I, II, III battalions)
- 386th Infantry Regiment (I, II, III battalions)
- 397th Infantry Regiment (I, II, III battalions)
- 218th Artillery Regiment (I, II, III IV battalions)
- 218th Panzerjäger Battalion
- 218th Reconnaissance Battalion
- 218th Pioneer Battalion
- 218th Signals Battalion
- 218th Division Support Units

After the Polish campaign the division transferred 3 of its 4 artillery battalions. The staff and 2 battalions were used to upgrade the 14th Landwehr Division into the 205th Infantry Division. The IV Artillery Regiment 218 went to provide the 76th Infantry Division with a heavy Artillery Battalion. Its anti tank (Panzerjäger) battalion was transferred to the 162 infantry division. In March 1941 each Infantry Regiment formed a 'Feldrekruten' battalion, and the artillery regiment was recreated. At the start of the French campaign the division was normal except,

- 218th Artillery Regiment (I, II, IV battalions, missing III)
- 218th Panzerjäger Battalion (only 1 company)

In the summer of 1940, with the fall of France, less divisions were needed and the division was stood down, so that its men could return to the work pool. However, with the prospect of fighting in Russia, more forces were again needed and the division was reformed in February 1941, and send to Denmark, until November when it was posted to Russia. At this time it still had only a single Panzerjäger company and a bicycle company in lieu of a reconnaissance battalion, and was equipped with Czech and other captured transport vehicles. After 6 months in Russia the Panzerjäger company was rebuilt to a battalion and a divisional fusilier battalion was formed. However at the same time each infantry regiment dissolved one of their three battalions leaving the division with 7 infantry style battalions.

By September 1943 the division was reorganized as a Type 44, and in good shape as it was listed as category 2, capable of limited offensive missions and was listed as follows,

- 323rd grenadier Regiment (II, III battalions)
- 386th grenadier Regiment (II, III battalions)
- 397th grenadier Regiment (I, III battalions)
- 218th Artillery Regiment (I, II, III IV battalions)
- 218th Fusilier Battalion
- 218th Division Support Units

After again suffering severe losses in the fighting on the Baltic Islands the 397 Regiment was disbanded in December 1944 leaving only 5 battalions of infantry.

== Area of Operations ==
- Poland: September 1939 - May 1940
- France: May 1940 - May 1941
- Denmark: May 1941 - December 1941
- Eastern Front, Army Group North: December 1941 - May 1945
  - Kholm: December 1941
  - Courland: October 1944 - May 1945

== Commanders ==
- Generalleutnant Woldemar Freiherr von Grote 26.VIII.1939 – 1.I.1942
- Generalleutnant Horst Freiherr von Uckermann 1.I.1942 –20.III.1942
- Generalleutnant Victor Hans Karl Lang 20.III.1942 – 25.XII.1944
- Generalmajor Ingo von Collani 25.XII.1944 – 1.V.1945
- Generalleutnant Werner Ranck 1.V.1945 – 8.V.1945

== See also ==
- German order of battle for Operation Fall Weiss
- List of German military units of World War II

== Bibliography ==
- Nafziger, George F. (31 Mar 2000). German Order of Battle: Infantry in World War II. Greenhill Books. ISBN 978-1-85367-393-1.
- Marc Romanych & Martin Rupp (10 Feb 2010). Maginot Line 1940: Battles on the French Frontier (Campaign). Osprey Publishing. ISBN 978-1846034992.
- Forczyk, Robert (20 Jun 2012). Demyansk 1942-43 (Campaign). Osprey Publishing. ISBN 978-1849085526.
- Grier, Howard D. (15 July 2007). Hitler, Donitz and the Baltic Sea: The Third Reich's Last Hope, 1944-1945. Naval Institute Press. ISBN 978-1591143451.
- Dunn, Walter Scott (30 May 2003). Heroes or Traitors: The German Replacement Army, the July Plot and Adolf Hitler. Praeger Publishers Inc. ISBN 978-0275977153.
