= Walter Hartmann =

German general (1891–1977)

- Born: 23 July 1891
- Died: 11 March 1977 (aged 85)
- Military career
- Allegiance: German Empire; Weimar Republic; Nazi Germany
- Branch: German Army
- Service years: 1910–1945
- Rank: General der Artillerie
- Commands: 87th Infantry Division; I Army Corps; VIII Army Corps; XXIV Panzer Corps
- Conflicts: World War I World War II
- Awards: Knight's Cross of the Iron Cross with Oak Leaves and Swords

Walter Hartmann (23 July 1891 – 11 March 1977) was a German general in the Wehrmacht during World War II. He was a recipient of the Knight's Cross of the Iron Cross with Oak Leaves and Swords of Nazi Germany.

During the evacuation of Crimea in 1944, he escaped on the Romanian minelayer Amiral Murgescu and reached the Romanian port of Constanța.

== Life ==
Hartmann joined the 1st Field Artillery Regiment No. 12 of the Saxon Army on 1 October 1910 as an officer candidate. On May 4, 1912, he was promoted to lieutenant by patent of May 24, 1910. During the First World War, Hartmann fought with his regiment on the Eastern Front and was awarded the Knight's Cross of the Military St. Order of Henry. In the course of the war, he became a lieutenant colonel on 13 March 1916 and came a month later as an observer to the Flieger-Ersatzabteilung 7. From January 1917 he served as First Adjutant of the Artillery Air School East and on 1 June 1918 he was transferred to Fliegergruppen-Commander 21 and commanded for training in the General Staff Service. For his achievements, Hartmann received both classes of the Iron Cross and the Knight's Cross 2nd Class of the Order of Albrecht with Swords.

After the war he was transferred to the Reichswehr and promoted to captain on 1 December 1921. In 1924 and 1925 he served on the staff of the 4th Division in Dresden. From the spring of 1927 he was assigned to the 4th Artillery Regiment and was appointed Major in 1932. From October 1934 he was commander of the Artillery Regiment Naumburg, after its renaming of the Artillery Regiment 60, where he was promoted to Lieutenant Colonel in June 1936. From October 1937 he was with the Artillery Regiment 24, where he was promoted to colonel in June 1938.

With this regiment he took part in the Invasion of Poland and in the Western Campaign. In November 1940, he was transferred to another artillery unit, which was involved in the invasion of the Soviet Union in June 1941. On July 15, 1941, he lost an arm and a leg due to a wound. On 10 August 1941 he was awarded the Knight's Cross of the Iron Cross and was promoted to Major General on 1 October 1941. After his health was restored, as far as possible, he returned to service at his own request and took command of a reserve division on May 1, 1942, and the 390th Field Training Division in September 1942, where he was promoted to lieutenant general in February 1943. From April 1943 he took command of the 87th Infantry Division, which was deployed at Welisch, from Lieutenant General Werner Richter. In November 1943 he was awarded the Oak Leaves for the Knight's Cross (340th Award). A few days earlier, he had been transferred to the Führerreserve and took part in a course in January 1944. On January 20, 1944, he took over from Carl Hilpert the leadership of the 1st Army Corps.

With his appointment as General of the Artillery, he took command of the XXXXIX Mountain Corps on May 1, 1944. The corps was deployed in Crimea, but had to withdraw to Romania. On September 1, 1944, he took command of the VIII Army Corps, which was deployed against the advancing Red Army. On 18 March 1944 he was awarded the Swords to the Knight's Cross (139th Award). From April 1, 1945, he took command of XXIV Panzerkorps, with which he was taken prisoner of war by the United States Army. He was released in June 1947.

== Awards ==
- Iron Cross (1914) 2nd Class (28 September 1914) & 1st Class (30 September 1916)
- Clasp to the Iron Cross (1939) 2nd Class (21 September 1939) & 1st Class (1 October 1939)
- Knight's Cross of the Iron Cross with Oak Leaves and Swords
  - Knight's Cross on 10 August 1941 as Oberst and Artilleriekommandeur 140
  - 340th Oak Leaves on 30 November 1943 as Generalleutnant and commander of the 87th Infantry Division
  - 139th Swords on 18 March 1945 as General der Artillerie and commanding general of the VIII. Armeekorps
- Certificate of Recognition of the commander of the army as a colonel and Arko 140 (30 July 1941)

Military offices
Preceded by Generalleutnant Werner Richter	Commander of 87th Infantry Division; 1 February 1943 – 22 November 1943	Succeeded by Generalleutnant Mauritz Freiherr von Strachwitz
Preceded by Generaloberst Carl Hilpert	Commander of I. Armeekorps; 20 January 1944 – 1 May 1944	Succeeded by Generaloberst Carl Hilpert
Preceded by General der Gebirgstruppe Rudolf Konrad	Commander of XXXXIX. Gebirgs-ArmeeKorps; 11 May 1944 – 4 August 1944	Succeeded by General der Gebirgstruppe Karl von Le Suire
Preceded by General der Infanterie Gustav Höhne	Commander of VIII. Armeekorps; 10 September 1944 – 19 March 1945	Succeeded by General der Infanterie Friedrich Wiese
Preceded by Generalleutnant Hans Källner	Commander of XXIV. Panzerkorps; 18 April 1945 – 8 May 1945	Succeeded by none
