= Waldemar Henrici =

- Born: 3 February 1878; Bensberg near Cologne, Rhine Province, Kingdom of Prussia, German Empire
- Died: 15 February 1950 (aged 72); Marktbreit, Kitzingen, Regierungsbezirk Unterfranken Bavaria, West Germany
- Military career
- Allegiance: Prussia (to 1918); Weimar Republic (to 1933); Nazi Germany (to 1944)
- Branch: Prussian Army; Imperial German Army; Reichsheer; German Army
- Service years: 1896–1943
- Rank: Lieutenant General; RAD-Obergeneralarbeitsführer
- Conflicts: World War I; World War II; Operation Barbarossa
- Awards: Iron Cross Class II and Class I; Prussian Service Cross; Bavarian Military Cross of Merit Class IV with Swords; Knight's Cross, First Class of the Order of Albrecht with swords; Knight's Cross, First Class of the Order of Frederick with swords; The Prince of Schaumburg-Lippe Cross for Faithful Service; Austrian Military Merit Cross Class III; Iron Crescent

Hermann Waldemar Henrici (February 3, 1878 – February 15, 1950) was a Lieutenant General of the German Wehrmacht who commanded a division of the VII Army Corps in the 4th Army during Operation Barbarossa, the German invasion of Russia during the Second World War, and also a leading figure in the Reichsarbeitsdienst.

== Career ==
=== Early life and service ===
Henrici was born in Bensberg as son of Prussian Major Hermann Henrici (d. 4 December 1891 in Kassel). He attended Gymnasium three and a half years and cadet corps five and a half years. He joined the 2. Unter-Elsässisches Infanterie-Regiment Nr. 137 of the Prussian Army on 7 March 1896 and was commissioned as 2nd Lieutenant on the same day. On 20 March 1906, he was promoted to 1st Lieutenant and on 16 June 1911 to Captain.

He was attached to the Prussian War Ministry in 1914 before departing for the front lines having been wounded on 24 July 1915. From 7 August 1915, he served with the general staff at the Great headquarters and was promoted to Major on 6 June 1916. In the same year, he would return to front duty.

=== Inter-war years ===
Following the end of the war he worked for the Defence Ministry as a lecturer, reaching the rank of lieutenant colonel in 1921. He received a doctorate in political science in 1923 with a dissertation entitled "The coal industry in Russia and after the war".

Dr. rer. pol. Lieutenant Colonel (promoted on 1 April 1921) Henrici commanded forces in the Reichswehr from 1923, becoming a colonel on 1 December 1925. He took command of the 2nd Prussian Infantry Regiment in Olsztyn in 1928. With the rise of Nazi Germany he became an Arbeitsgauleiter in the Reichsarbeitsdienst. In 1933, he became Secretary of State in the Ministry of Labour and later Reich Commissioner in the Freiwilliger Arbeitsdienst.

=== World War II ===
Henrici rejoined the army in 1939, and took command of the 555th Infantry Division stationed on the Rhine in 1940. He took part in the initial action against France before being sent to Poland to command the 258th Infantry Division. In 1941, he led his division in Operation Barbarossa, being promoted to lieutenant general (Generalleutnant z. V.) on 1 October 1941. He was wounded the following day and spent two months in hospital.

After his return, he became Wehrmachtbefehlshaber Ukraine (military commander of Reichskommissariat Ukraine). He went into retirement in December 1943, and died in 1950 in Marktbreit.
