= Kurt von Briesen =

Nazi general

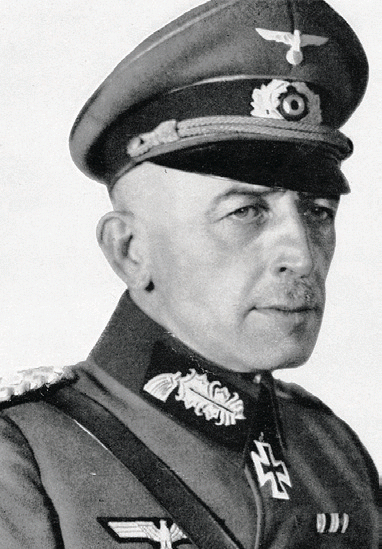
- Born: 3 May 1886
- Died: 20 November 1941 (aged 55); Kharkov, Soviet Union
- Military career
- Allegiance: Nazi Germany
- Branch: Army
- Rank: General of the Infantry
- Commands: 30th Infantry Division; LII Army Corps
- Conflicts: World War I World War II
- Awards: Knight's Cross of the Iron Cross

Kurt von Briesen (3 May 1886 – 20 November 1941) was a general in the Wehrmacht of Nazi Germany. He was a recipient of the Knight’s Cross of the Iron Cross. Briesen led the 30th Infantry Division in the invasion of Poland in 1939. On 1 August 1940, Briesen was promoted to the rank of general of the infantry. On 25 November 1940 he was appointed commanding general of the LII Army Corps. Briesen was killed by Soviet aircraft near Isjum on the Seversky Donets River, southeast of Kharkov, on 20 November 1941.

== Awards and decorations ==
- Iron Cross (1914) 2nd Class (September 1914) & 1st Class (December 1914)
- Knight's Cross of the House Order of Hohenzollern with Swords (April 1918)
- Clasp to the Iron Cross (1939) 2nd Class (20 September 1939) & 1st Class (4 October 1939)
- Knight's Cross of the Iron Cross on 27 October 1939 as Generalleutnant and commander of 30. Infanterie-Division

Military offices
Preceded by Generalleutnant Carl-Heinrich von Stülpnagel	Commander of 30. Infanterie-Division; 4 February 1938 – 1 July 1939	Succeeded by Generalleutnant Franz Böhme
Preceded by Generalleutnant Franz Böhme	Commander of 30. Infanterie-Division; 19 July 1939 – 25 November 1940	Succeeded by Generalmajor Walter Buechs
Preceded by None	Commander of LII. Armeekorps; 25 November 1940 – 20 November 1941	Succeeded by Generalleutnant Albert Zehler
