= Harry Hoppe =

German general

- Born: 11 February 1894; Braunschweig, Duchy of Brunswick, German Empire
- Died: 23 August 1969 (aged 75); Wetzlar, Hesse, West Germany
- Relatives: Christine Franziska Alice Hubertine Freiin von Eynatten (m. 1927)
- Military career
- Allegiance: German Empire; Weimar Republic; Nazi Germany
- Branch: Imperial German Army; Freikorps; Reichswehr; Heer (Wehrmacht)
- Service years: 1914–1945
- Rank: Generalleutnant
- Nickname: Stan Laurel
- Commands: Infanterie-Regiment 424; 126. Infanterie-Division; 278. Infanterie-Division
- Conflicts: World War I; World War II; Invasion of Poland; Battle of France; Operation Barbarossa; Siege of Leningrad; Italian Campaign; Operation Diadem; Gothic Line Offensive
- Awards: Knight's Cross of the Iron Cross with Oak Leaves

Arthur Harry Karl Hoppe (11 February 1894 – 23 August 1969) was a German general during World War II who commanded several divisions. He was also a recipient of the Knight's Cross of the Iron Cross with Oak Leaves of Nazi Germany.

== Promotions ==
- 8 August 1914 Kriegsfreiwilliger (War Volunteer)
- 24 March 1915 Gefreiter (Private E-2 / Lance Corporal)
- 31 March 1915 Unteroffizier (NCO / Corporal / Junior Sergeant)
- 9 April 1915 Vizefeldwebel (Vice Sergeant / Vice Staff Sergeant)
  - 13 April 1915 Offiziers-Aspirant (Officer Candidate)
- 24 April 1916 Leutnant der Reserve (2nd Lieutenant of the Reserves)
- 18 March 1918 Leutnant (active 2nd Lieutenant) without Patent
  - 10 December 1918 received Patent from 13 July 1915
  - 1 July 1922 received Reichswehr Rank Seniority (RDA) from 1 September 1915 (22)
- 1 April 1925 Oberleutnant (1st Lieutenant) with RDA from 1 April 1925 (2)
- 1 October 1929 Hauptmann (Captain) with RDA from 1 October 1929 (14)
- 1 October 1935 Major (7)
- 31 May 1938 Oberstleutnant (Lieutenant Colonel) with effect and RDA from 1 June 1938 (32)
- 14 June 1941 Oberst (Colonel) with effect and RDA from 1 July 1941 (6)
  - 28 June 1942 received new and improved RDA from 1 August 1940 (3a)
- 16 November 1942 Generalmajor (Major General) with effect and RDA from 1 December 1942 (15)
- 15 May 1943 Generalleutnant (Lieutenant General) with effect and RDA from 1 June 1943 (10)

== Awards and decorations ==
- DRA Sports Badge/Award for diverse achievements in the field of physical exercise (Auszeichnung für vielseitige Leistungen auf dem Gebiet der Leibesübungen) in Bronze on 25 October 1913
- Iron Cross (1914), 2nd and 1st Class
  - 2nd Class on 20 March 1916
  - 1st Class on 15 March 1917
- War Merit Cross (Brunswick), 2nd and 1st Class
  - 2nd Class (BrKr2/BrK2) on the ribbon for combatants on 1 September 1916
    - Frontline Service Horse Clasp to the 2nd Class (BrKr2a/BrK2a) in 1918
  - 1st Class (BrKr1/BrK1) on 1 August 1918
- House Order of Hohenzollern, Knight's Cross with Swords (HOH3X) on 17 April 1918
- Wound Badge (1918) in Mattweiß (Silver)
- Bronze Statue for Sporting Achievements on 10 July 1921
- DRA/German Gymnastics and Sports Badge (Deutsches Turn- und Sportabzeichen) in Silver on 12 May 1926
- Honour Cross of the World War 1914/1918 with Swords on 1 March 1935
- Wehrmacht Long Service Award, 4th to 1st Class
  - 2nd Class on 2 October 1936
  - 1st Class in August 1939
- Hungarian World War Commemorative Medal with Swords
- Austrian War Commemorative Medal with Swords
- West Wall Medal
- Repetition Clasp 1939 to the Iron Cross 1914, 2nd and 1st Class
  - 2nd Class on 26 September 1939
  - 1st Class on 12 July 1941
- Infantry Assault Badge in Silver on 31 August 1941
- Knight's Cross of the Iron Cross with Oak Leaves
  - Knight's Cross on 12 September 1941 as Oberst and Commander of Infanterie-Regiment 424
  - Oak Leaves on 18 December 1944 as Generalleutnant and Commander of the 278. Infanterie-Division
- German Cross in Gold on 18 May 1942 as Oberst and Commander of the Infanterie-Regiment 424
- Spanish War Cross, I. Class on 30 June 1942
- Winter Battle in the East 1941–42 Medal on 1 August 1942
- Mentioned by name in the Wehrmacht Report (Namentliche Nennung im Wehrmachtbericht) on 6 July 1944

== Writings ==
- Die 278. Infanterie-Division in Italien 1944/45, Verlag Hans-Henning Podzun, Bad Nauheim 1953
- Werner Buxa / Erich von Manstein / Harry Hoppe: Die Deutsche Infanterie 1939–1945, Podzun Verlag, 1967

== Sources ==
- German Federal Archives: BArch PERS 6/640 and PERS 6/299902

Military offices
Preceded by General der Infanterie Paul Laux	Commander of 126. Infanterie-Division; 10 October 1942 – 31 April 1943	Succeeded by Generalleutnant Friedrich Hofmann
Preceded by Generalleutnant Friedrich Hofmann	Commander of 126. Infanterie-Division; 8 July 1943 – 7 November 1943	Succeeded by Oberst Gotthard Fischer
Preceded by General der Infanterie Hubert Gercke	Commander of 278. Infanterie-Division; 1 December 1943 – 28 January 1944	Succeeded by Generalmajor Paul Bornscheuer
Preceded by Generalmajor Paul Bornscheuer	Commander of 278. Infanterie-Division; 5 March 1944 – 2 May 1945	Succeeded by none
