= Bruno Schatz =

- Born: 24 June 1894; Markneukirchen, Kingdom of Saxony, German Empire
- Died: 3 December 1974 (aged 80); West Germany
- Relatives: ∞ 1921 Arnhild Walpurga Otto; 3 children
- Military career
- Allegiance: German Empire; Weimar Republic; Nazi Germany
- Branch: Imperial German Army; Freikorps; Reichsheer; German Army
- Service years: 1915–1920; 1934–1945
- Rank: Generalmajor
- Commands: 122nd Infantry Division
- Conflicts: World War I World War II: Battle of France; Operation Barbarossa; Battle of Kiev (1941); Second Battle of Kharkov; Battle of Stalingrad; Courland Pocket
- Awards: Knight's Cross of the Iron Cross
- Other work: Businessman (co-owner of his father's Musical Instrument Dealership firm, Hitzeroth & Schatz)

Hermann Bruno Schatz (24 June 1894 – 3 December 1974) was a German officer, finally Generalmajor, divisional commander and recipient of the Knight's Cross of the Iron Cross of the Wehrmacht in World War II.

== Life ==
=== WWII ===
On 27 October 1939, Schatz, who had completed his service at the War School in Potsdam, was placed at disposal of the 24th Infantry Division for use as battalion commander. On 1 November 1939, he was appointed commander of the III. Battalion/Infantry Regiment 31. On 8 August 1941, he was appointed commander of the Infanterie-Regiment 261 in Grafenwöhr, subordinated to the 113th Infantry Division.

On 1 December 1942, he was commanded to the Formation Staff of Training Staff 4 at the Infantry School in Döberitz and on 15 December 1942, he was appointed commander of the Training Staff 4 at the Infantry School. On 7 April 1943, he was appointed commander of the Grenadier-Regiment 268 in France, subordinated to the newly formed 113th Infantry Division (the former division was destroyed during the Battle of Stalingrad).

On 10 October 1943, he was transferred to the Führerreserve (OKH)/Army High Command Leader Reserve. On 1 January 1944, he was appointed commander of the Grenadier-Regiment 977, subordinated to the 271st Infantry Division. Following the heavy fighting resulting from the invasion of Normandy, the division was destroyed in August 1944 while serving with the 5th Panzer Army in the Falaise Pocket. The regiment was reconstituted in Tyrnau, Slovakia, on 17 September 1944, through the renaming of Grenadier Regiment 1186, which had been in the process of formation since 25 August 1944.

On 10 November 1944, he was again transferred to the Führerreserve (OKH) and then attended the 16th Divisional Commander Course from 21 November to 20 December 1944. On 2 January 1945, he once again was transferred to the Führerreserve (OKH) and on 21 January 1945, he was delegated with the leadership of the 122nd Infantry Division (his Ia was Gustav-Adolf Kuntzen). On 20 April 1945, after being promoted to Generalmajor, he was officially appointed commander of the 122nd Infantry Division, subordinated to the Army Group Courland under Carl Hilpert.

Schatz surrendered to the Soviet Red Army troops on 10 May 1945 in the Courland Pocket. In a show trial before a Soviet military court, he was convicted as a war criminal. He was repatriated to Germany in October 1955 as one of the last ″late homecomers″ (German: Spätheimkehrer).

== Family ==
Bruno was the son of Protestant Lutheran businessman Christian Hermann Schatz and his wife Johanna, née Stark. The "Musical Instruments Town of Markneukirchen", as it is known, is located in the Vogtland region, near the border with the Czech Republic.

=== Marriage ===
On 21 January 1921 in Plauen, Schatz married his fiancée Arnhild Walpurga/Walburga Otto, daughter of Director of the Local Court (Amtsgerichtsdirektor) in Plauen Dr. jur. Ulrich Otto (1868–1931) and his wife Martha, née Heinel (1877–1958). They would have three children:

- Hermann-Ulrich (b. 15 March 1922 in Markneukirchen; † October 1943)
- Siegfried Henning (born 3 April 1923 in Markneukirchen; d. 1 October 2013 in Stuttgart)
- Waltraud Barbara (born 12 May 1931 in Markneukirchen)

== Promotions ==
- 12 March 1914 Fahnenjunker (Officer Candidate)
  - joined the Royal Saxon 1st Foot Artillery Regiment No. 12 in Metz (Imperial Territory of Alsace-Lorraine) but was discharged after only a few days during basic training after military doctors claimed to have diagnosed an enlarged heart. He began studying law in Leipzig. At the outbreak of the war in August 1914, he volunteered but was rejected several times due to "health concerns" (based on an assessment from March 1914). Finally, in February 1915, he was accepted—after having waived any potential claims in writing.
- 22 February 1915 Landsturm Recruit with the Royal Saxon 9th Infantry Regiment No. 133
  - 21 April 1915 appointed Einjährig-Freiwilliger (one-year volunteer)
- 22 July 1915 Gefreiter (Private E-2/Lance Corporal)
- 27 July 1915 Fahnenjunker (Officer Candidate)
- 31 July 1915 Fahnenjunker-Unteroffizier (Officer Candidate with Corporal/NCO/Junior Sergeant rank)
- 28 September 1915 Fähnrich (Officer Cadet)
- 3 December 1915 Leutnant (2nd Lieutenant) without Patent
  - 6 November 1917 received Patent from 22 May 1914
- 27 December 1919 Charakter als Oberleutnant (Honorary 1st Lieutenant)
- 1 November 1925 Territorial or state protection employee (Landesschutz-Angestellter) of the Reichswehr
- 1 October 1933 Oberleutnant a. D. (L); territorial protection / state security officer as a 1st Lieutenant (Ret.) with Rank Seniority (RDA) from 1 July 1930
- 1 May 1934 Hauptmann (active Captain) with RDA from 1 July 1933
  - 20 January 1935 received ordinal number (Ordnungsnummer) "42" to his RDA from 1 July 1933
  - 11 April 1935 received new and improved RDA from 1 April 1933 (101a)
- 18 January 1937 Major with effect and RDA from 1 January 1937 (16)
- 20 April 1940 Oberstleutnant (Lieutenant Colonel) with effect and RDA from 1 April 1940 (62)
- 16 March 1942 Oberst (Colonel) with effect and RDA from 1 April 1942 (114)
- 15 April 1945 (telex date) Generalmajor (Major General) with effect and RDA from 20 April 1945

== Awards and decorations ==
- Iron Cross (1914), 2nd and 1st Class
  - EK II on 25 May 1916
  - EK I on 5 August 1918
- Saxon Albert Order, Knight 2nd Class with Swords (SA3bX/AR2X) on 7 November 1916
- Saxon Military Order of St. Henry, Knight's Cross (SH3) on 26 July 1917
- Princely House Order of Hohenzollern, Cross of Honour III. Class (HEK3X/HE3X) on 2 May 1918
- Honour Cross of the World War 1914/1918 with Swords on 15 January 1935
- Wehrmacht Long Service Award, 4th to 2nd Class on 2 October 1936
- Repetition Clasp 1939 to the Iron Cross 1914, 2nd and 1st Class
  - Clasp to EK II on 30 May 1940
  - Clasp to EK I on 26 June 1940
- Order of the Crown of Italy, Officer's Cross on 27 August 1940
- German Cross in Gold on 19 December 1941
- Winter Battle in the East 1941–42 Medal on 1 October 1942
- Knight's Cross of the Iron Cross on 9 December 1944 as Oberst and Commander of the Grenadier-Regiment 977

== Sources ==
- German Federal Archives: BArch PERS 6/1848 and PERS 6/300722

Military offices
Preceded by General der Infanterie Friedrich Fangohr	Commander of 122. Infanterie-Division; 20 January 1945 – 8 May 1945	Succeeded by None
