= 557th Infantry Division =

- 557. Infanterie-Division
- Active: 15 February 1940 – 31 August 1940
- Country: Nazi Germany
- Branch: Heer (Wehrmacht)
- Type: Infantry
- Size: Division
- Engagements: Phoney War

Commanders
- Commander: Hermann Kuprion

The 557th Infantry Division (German: 557. Infanterie-Division) was an infantry division of the Heer, the ground forces of Nazi Germany's Wehrmacht. It was active for several months in the year 1940.

== History ==
The 557th Infantry Division was formed on 15 February 1940 as a positional division for defensive duties in the Upper Rhine sector, during the standoff along the Franco-German border, the Phoney War. Its assembly was implemented by Wehrkreis IV, and its staff was initially formed using personnel from Division Command z.b.V. 427. The sole commander of 557th Infantry Division throughout its history was Hermann Kuprion.

The division initially consisted of three regiments: Infantry Regiment 632 was formed using personnel of the II./425 battalion of 223rd Infantry Division as well as half of II./412 of 227th Infantry Division; Infantry Regiment 633 was formed using personnel of the II./306 battalion of 211th Infantry Division and the other half of II./412 battalion of 227th Division; Infantry Regiment 634 was formed (in Leoben) using personnel from II./335 battalion of 205th Infantry Division. Additionally, the 557th Infantry Division also contained Artillery Regiment 557 with three detachments, the Observation Detachment 557 and the Division Units 557.

The division served as part of XXV Army Corps from May to June 1940, along with 555th Infantry Division. It served across the French defensive lines, the Maginot Line.

Following a directive on 19 July, the 557th Infantry Division was formally dissolved on 31 August 1940 in the Zeitz-Weißenfels area, as the June 1940 German victory in the Battle of France had rendered the various positional divisions on the Franco-German border superfluous. The division was split into autonomous home guard battalions, of which eight were sent to Wehrkreis II to guard prisoners of war, whereas battalion III./634 was deployed to the Protectorate of Bohemia-Moravia. The battalions were designated as the Landesschützen Battalions 975 through 983 on 1 January 1941.
