= 555th Infantry Division =

Military unit

- German: 555. Infanterie-Division
- Active: 10 February – 25 September 1940
- Country: Nazi Germany
- Branch: Heer (Wehrmacht)
- Type: Infantry
- Size: Division
- Engagements: Phony War

Commanders
- Commander: Waldemar Henrici

The 555th Infantry Division (German: 555. Infanterie-Division) was an infantry division of the German Heer during World War II. It was formed in February 1940 as a defensive unit in the Upper Rhine; three of its regiments were formed from existing units in other divisions and the personnel for the fourth were drawn from the Landschutz (militia). Because of its fragmented formation it lacked the regional identity which was found in many early war German divisions. The division played a defensive role in the Battle for France, holding positions opposite Strasbourg. It was moved into reserve in July 1940 and dissolved in September.

== Operational history ==
The 555th Infantry Division was formed on 10 February 1940 as a defensive unit in the Upper Rhine area. The staff was formed from Division z.b.V. 443, as well as the Infantry Regiments 624, 625, 626 and 627 and the Artillery Regiment 555. The Infantry Regiment 624 was formed from Infantry Regiment 308 (207th Infantry Division), Infantry Regiment 625 was formed from Infantry Regiment 338 (208th Infantry Division), and Infantry Regiment 626 was formed from Infantry Regiment 377 (225th Infantry Division). Infantry Regiment 627 was formed from Landschutz battalions. As a result of this style of assembly, the 555th Infantry Division didn't have a unified regional identity under which most soldiers were from the same Wehrkreis, as had been the case for many early German infantry divisions. The division itself was formed in Wehrkreis VI, but used Infantry Regiments from Wehrkreis III (Regiment 625), X (Regiment 626) and XX (Regiment 624). The Artillery Regiment 555 was assembled from units from three different Wehrkreis districts, namely I, II and VI. Its number of infantry regiments was also unusual. Whereas most German infantry divisions had three infantry regiments and some later divisions (like those of the fifteenth Aufstellungswelle) had two, the 555th Infantry Division consisted of four infantry regiments.

The division was deployed as a part of the Westwall (dubbed Siegfried Line by the Western Allies) under command of the XXV Army Corps (Karl Ritter von Prager) under 7th Army (Friedrich Dollmann) in Army Group C (Wilhelm Ritter von Leeb). It was deployed at the beginning of the Battle of France (10 May 1940) in northern Baden, in the area of the cities of Rastatt and Baden-Baden. By mid-June, this area would also include Achern and Kehl. Its southern neighbor was the 557th Infantry Division, with 96th Infantry Division to the northeast (in the Karlsruhe-Bruchsal sector) and 78th Infantry Division to the east (in the Pforzheim sector). The 555th Infantry Division sat opposite a part of the French frontier guarded by the French 5th Army. Starting on 14 June 1940, parts of 7th Army started to move into position to breach the southeastern length of the Maginot Line, but the 555th Division initially remained in place, opposite the heavily fortified French fortress divisions around Strasbourg.

After the German victory in the Battle of France, the 555th Infantry Division's defensive assignment was no longer needed. The division was moved to the reserve in its home Wehrkreis in July 1940. It was dissolved on 25 September 1940.

The division's only commander during its seven-month lifespan was Waldemar Henrici, who served in this role from February to August.

== Noteworthy individuals ==
- Dr. Waldemar Henrici, only divisional commander.
