= 278th Infantry Division =

278th Infanterie-Division 278th Volksgrenadier Division
- 278. Infanterie-Division; 278. Volksgrenadier-Division
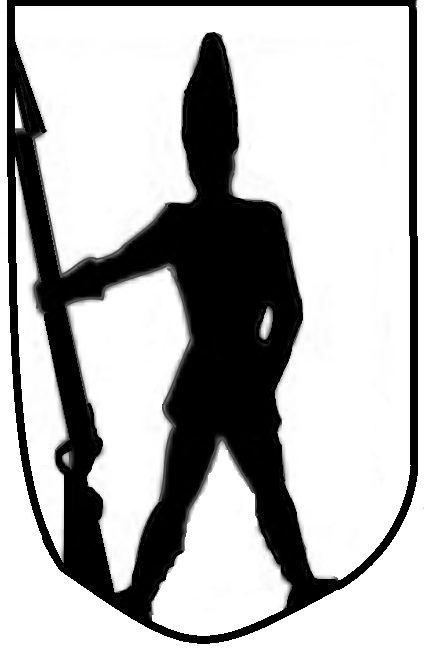
- Vehicle insignia
- Active: Feb 1943 – 1945
- Country: Nazi Germany
- Branch: Army
- Type: Infantry
- Size: Division
- Engagements: World War II: Italy; Gothic Line

Commanders
- Notable commanders: Lt General Harry Hoppe

The 278th Infantry Division (German: 278. Infanterie-Division) was a German Army infantry division in World War II. Formed in 1940 from older personnel, the first 278th never saw combat and was dissolved after the fall to France. The second 278th was formed in mid 1942 in Belgium and was sent to Army Group C Italy in late 1943.

== Operational history ==
Serving on coastal defense duties and taking part in anti-partisan operations in Istria while continuing its training. In mid-May 1944, the 278th division received orders to move to the battle area on the Adriatic for operational assignment to the 10th German Army. Facing Lieutenant General Wladyslaw Anders’ Polish II Corps, Hoppe's division fought a ferocious defensive battle for the port city of Ancona from mid-June until early July 1944. After halting the Polish attack early in July the 278th Infantry Division faced a renewed attack by the Polish II Corps on July 17. Pushing the Germans beyond the Esino River, Ancona fell to the Poles on the 18th.

It was then assigned to LXXVI Panzer Corps defending the Gothic Line. After heavy losses the 278th was formed into a Volksgrenadier Division in early 1945. Later it was transferred to the 1st Parachute Corps defending the Brenner Pass where most of the division was encircled, the remainder later surrendered on the May 2, 1945

== War crimes ==
The division has been implicated in a number of war crimes in Italy between March and July 1944, with up to seven civilians executed in each incident.

== Organization ==
1944

- Grenadier-Regiment 992
- Grenadier-Regiment 993
- Grenadier-Regiment 994
- Artillerie-Regiment 278,
- Divisions-Füsilier-Kompanie 278
- Panzer-Jäger-Abteilung 278
- Engineer-Battalion 278
- Signals Battalion 278
- I° Battaglione d'assalto 'Forlì'
