= Gerhard Feyerabend =

German general (1898–1965)

- Born: 29 April 1898; Dopsattel Estate near Königsberg, Province of East Prussia, Kingdom of Prussia, German Empire
- Died: 6 November 1965 (aged 67); Rottach-Egern, Bavaria, West Germany
- Relatives: ∞ 1924 Erna Reschke (1901–1945); 1 daughter (1934–1945)
- Military career
- Allegiance: German Empire; Weimar Republic; Nazi Germany
- Branch: Imperial German Army; Reichsheer; German Army
- Service years: 1916–1945
- Rank: Generalleutnant
- Commands: 87th Infantry Division; 11th Infantry Division
- Conflicts: World War I; World War II; Occupation of Czechoslovakia; Invasion of Poland; Battle of France; Invasion of Yugoslavia; Operation Barbarossa; Operation Overlord; Courland Pocket
- Awards: Knight's Cross of the Iron Cross

Gerhard Fritz Franz Feyerabend (29 April 1898 – 6 November 1965) was a German general and divisional commander in the Wehrmacht of Nazi Germany during World War II. He was a recipient of the Knight's Cross of the Iron Cross. Feyerabend surrendered to the Soviet forces in the Courland Pocket on 10 May 1945; he was released on 10 July 1947.

== Promotions ==
- 29 March 1916 Fähnrich (Officer Cadet)
  - transferred as such from the Preußische Hauptkadettenanstalt ("Royal Prussian Cadet's Institute") to the 2nd Masurian Field Artillery Regiment No. 82
- 5 December 1916 Leutnant (2nd Lieutenant) without Patent
  - later received Patent from 25 December 1916
  - 1 July 1922 received Reichswehr Rank Seniority (RDA) from 1 May 1917 (7)
- 31 July 1925 Oberleutnant (1st Lieutenant) with effect and RDA from 1 April 1925 (535)
- 1 April 1933 (42) Hauptmann (Captain)
- 2 August 1936 Major with effect and RDA from 1 August 1936 (42)
- 20 March 1939 Oberstleutnant (Lieutenant Colonel) with effect from 1 April 1939 and RDA from 1 January 1939 (42a)
- 9 November 1941 Oberst (Colonel) with effect and RDA from 1 December 1941 (8)
- 1 February 1944 (13) Generalmajor (Major General)
- 23 February 1945 (telex date) Generalleutnant (Lieutenant General) with effect and RDA from 1 March 1945

== Awards and decorations ==
- Iron Cross (1914), 2nd and 1st Class
  - 2nd Class on 8 November 1916
  - 1st Class on 27 March 1924
- German Gymnastics and Sports Badge in Bronze in September 1920
- Honour Cross of the World War 1914/1918 with Swords on 18 January 1935
- Wehrmacht Long Service Award, 4th to 2nd Class on 2 October 1936
- Sudetenland Medal with the Prague Castle Bar
- Repetition Clasp 1939 to the Iron Cross 1914, 2nd and 1st Class
  - 2nd Class on 24 September 1939
  - 1st Class on 9 November 1939
- Winter Battle in the East 1941–42 Medal on 14 July 1942
- Courland Cuff Title
- German Cross in Gold on 2 February 1943 as Oberst and Chief of the General Staff of the XXVII. Armeekorps
- Knight's Cross of the Iron Cross on 5 April 1945 as Generalleutnant and Commander of the 11. Infanterie-Division

== Sources ==
- German Federal Archives: BArch PERS 6/2533 and PERS 6/299637

Military offices
Preceded by Generalleutnant Mauritz Freiherr von Strachwitz	Commander of 87. Infanterie-Division; August 1944 – September 1944	Succeeded by Generalmajor Helmuth Walter
Preceded by Generalleutnant Hellmuth Reymann	Commander of 11. Infanterie-Division; 18 November 1944 – 10 May 1945	Succeeded by none
