= Werner Neumann (officer) =

German Knight's Cross recipient (1905–1970)

- Born: 13 May 1905
- Died: 4 July 1970 (aged 65)
- Military career
- Allegiance: Weimar Germany; Nazi Germany
- Branch: German Army (Wehrmacht)
- Rank: Generalmajor
- Commands: 563rd Volksgrenadier Division
- Conflicts: World War II
- Awards: Knight's Cross of the Iron Cross

Werner Neumann (13 May 1905 – 4 July 1970) was a general in the Wehrmacht of Nazi Germany during World War II who commanded the 563rd Volksgrenadier Division. He was a recipient of the Knight's Cross of the Iron Cross.

Neumann surrendered to the Red Army in May 1945 in the Courland Pocket. Convicted as a war criminal in the Soviet Union, he was held until 1955.

== Awards and decorations ==
- Knight's Cross of the Iron Cross on 5 September 1944 as Oberst and commander of Grenadier-Regiment 121

Military offices
| Preceded by Generalmajor Ferdinand Brühl | Commander of 563. Volkgrenadier-Division; 25 February 1945 - 8 May 1945 | Succeeded by None |
