= Kurt Haehling =

German Wehrmacht general (1897–1983)

Kurt Hähling
- Born: 7 November 1897; Rosengarten, District of Angerburg, Province of East Prussia, Kingdom of Prussia, German Empire
- Died: 20 May 1983 (aged 85); Finsterwalde, Bezirk Cottbus, East Germany
- Relatives: ∞ 13 May 1922 Margarete Hedwig Elisabeth Hosemann; 2 sons
- Military career
- Allegiance: German Empire; Weimar Republic; Nazi Germany
- Branch: Imperial German Army; Freikorps; Preliminary Reichswehr; Police (Polizei); Heer (Wehrmacht)
- Service years: 1914–1920; 1925–1945
- Rank: Generalmajor
- Service number: NSDAP #2,074,657 (joined 1 May 1933)
- Commands: Artillerie-Regiment 294; Artillery Commander 108; Grenadier-Regiment 347; 73rd Infantry Division; 87th Infantry Division; 126th Infantry Division
- Conflicts: World War I World War II: Invasion of Poland; Battle of France; Invasion of Yugoslavia; Operation Barbarossa; Battle of Kiev (1941); First Battle of Kharkov; Battle of the Caucasus; Lublin–Brest Offensive; Courland Pocket
- Awards: German Cross in Gold; Knight's Cross of the Iron Cross
- Other work: Bank official (1920–1924); Politician (1951–1963)

Kurt Johannes Hähling (7 November 1897 – 20 May 1983) was a German general in the Wehrmacht during World War II. He was a recipient of the Knight's Cross of the Iron Cross of Nazi Germany. Hähling surrendered to the Red Army in May 1945 in the Courland Pocket.

== Post-WWII ==
On 28 March 1951, he was repatriated to East Germany and became a member of the NDPD (National Democratic Party of Germany) and a full-time party official. In 1952, he became deputy chairman, and from 1953 to September 1960, chairman of the NDPD district association of Dresden. Simultaneously, from 1953 to 1963, he was a member of the NDPD's main committee and a representative in the Dresden district assembly. From May 1954 to 1958, he was a member of the National Council of the National Front of the GDR. From 1958 onward, he was also a member of the executive committee of the Association of Former Officers (AeO).

== Promotions ==
- 6 August 1914 Kriegsfreiwilliger und Artillerist (War Volunteer and Artilleryman)
- 18 August 1915 Gefreiter (Private E-2/Lance Corporal)
- 21 October 1916 Unteroffizier (NCO/Corporal/Junior Sergeant)
- 24 November 1917 Vizewachtmeister (Vice Sergeant/Vice Staff Sergeant/Junior Sergeant-Major)
- 22 October 1918 Leutnant der Landwehr I. Klasse (2nd Lieutenant of the Landwehr, 1st Class)

=== Police ===
- 1 April 1925 Polizei-Wachtmeister (Staff Sergeant of the Police)
- 17 December 1925 Polizei-Oberwachtmeister (Sergeant Major / Senior Staff Sergeant of the Police)
- 17 April 1928 Polizei-Leutnant (2nd Lieutenant of the Police) with effect from 1 April 1928
- 11 April 1930 Polizei-Oberleutnant (1st Lieutenant of the Police) with effect from 1 April 1930
- 30 January 1935 Hauptmann der Landespolizei (Captain of the State Police) with effect from 1 January 1935

=== Wehrmacht ===
- 1 August 1935 Hauptmann (Captain) with Rank Seniority (RDA) from 1 August 1933 (20b)
- 31 July 1937 Major with effect and Rank Seniority (RDA) from 1 August 1937 (8)
- 20 October 1940 Oberstleutnant (Lieutenant Colonel) with effect and RDA from 1 November 1940 (3)
- 15 May 1942 Oberst (Colonel) with effect and RDA from 1 June 1942 (2)
- 30 January 1945 (18) Generalmajor (Major General)

== Awards and decorations ==
- Iron Cross (1914), 2nd Class on 13 September 1916
- Honour Cross of the World War 1914/1918 with Swords
- Wehrmacht Long Service Award, 4th to 2nd Class
  - 3rd Class on 2 October 1936
  - 2nd Class on 5 September 1937
- Repetition Clasp 1939 to the Iron Cross 1914, 2nd Class on 1 October 1939
- Wound Badge (1939) in Black (wounded on 11 September 1939)
- Iron Cross (1939), 1st Class on 19 July 1940
- German Cross in Gold on 24 December 1941
- General Assault Badge on 2 June 1942
- Winter Battle in the East 1941–42 Medal on 1 August 1942
- Courland Cuff Title
- Knight's Cross of the Iron Cross on 2 March 1945 as Generalmajor and Commander of the 126. Infanterie-Division
- Patriotic Order of Merit in Bronze on 5 October 1955
- Ernst Moritz Arndt Medal of the National Council of the National Front of the GDR

== Sources ==
- German Federal Archives: BArch PERS 6/1323 and PERS 6/299771

Military offices
Preceded by Generalleutnant Dr. Friedrich Franek	Commander of 73. Infanterie-Division; 30 July 1944 – 7 September 1944	Succeeded by Generalmajor Franz Schlieper
Preceded by Generalleutnant Gotthard Fischer	Commander of 126. Infanterie-Division; 14 February 1945 – 8 May 1945	Succeeded by None
