= 87th Infantry Division (Wehrmacht) =

- 87. Infanterie-Division
- Active: 26 August 1939 – 10 May 1945
- Country: Nazi Germany
- Branch: Army
- Type: Infantry
- Size: Division
- Garrison/HQ: Altenburg

Commanders
- Notable commanders: Walter Lucht; Walter Hartmann; Gerhard Feyerabend

The 87th Infantry Division (German: 87. Infanterie-Division) was an infantry division of the German Army during the Second World War, active from 1939 to 1945.

== Operational history ==
The 87th Infantry Division was created on 26 August 1939 in Altenburg.

The division is notable as the first German division to enter the French capital city of Paris on 14 June 1940, during the Battle of France. The French 7th Army had abandoned the city the previous day, leaving it as an open city to avoid the city's destruction.

The division went into captivity in the Courland pocket.

== Commanders ==
- Generalleutnant (Note: The rank of generalleutnant is equivalent to that of major general in the United States Army.) Bogislav von Studnitz (26 August 1939 – 16 February 1942; 1 March – 21 August 1942);
- General der Artillerie Walther Lucht (17 – 28 February 1942);
- Generalleutnant Werner Richter (22 August 1942 – 31 January 1943);
- General der Artillerie Walter Hartmann (1 February – 21 November 1943);
- Generalleutnant Mauritz Freiherr von Strachwitz (22 November 1943 – August 1944);
- Generalleutnant Gerhard Feyerabend (August – September 1944);
- Generalmajor Helmuth Walter (September 1944 – 15 January 1945);
- Generalleutnant Mauritz Freiherr von Strachwitz (16 January 1945 – 10 May 1945).

== Notes ==
Footnotes

Citations
