= Mauritz Freiherr von Strachwitz =

German WWII general

- Born: 12 December 1898
- Died: 10 December 1953 (aged 54); Camp Asbest, Sverdlovsk Oblast
- Military career
- Allegiance: German Empire; Weimar Republic; Nazi Germany
- Branch: Army
- Rank: Generalleutnant
- Commands: 87th Infantry Division
- Conflicts: Courland Pocket
- Awards: Knight's Cross of the Iron Cross

Mauritz Freiherr von Strachwitz (12 December 1898 – 10 December 1953) was a German general during World War II. He was a recipient of the Knight's Cross of the Iron Cross. Strachwitz surrendered to the Soviet forces in May 1945 in the Courland Pocket. He died on 10 December 1953 in Camp Asbest in the Sverdlovsk Oblast.

== Awards and decorations ==
- Knight's Cross of the Iron Cross on 9 January 1945 as Generalleutnant and commander of the 87. Infanterie-Division

Military offices
Preceded by General der Artillerie Walter Hartmann	Commander of 87. Infanterie-Division; 22 November 1943 – August 1944	Succeeded by Generalleutnant Gerhard Feyerabend
Preceded by Generalmajor Helmuth Walter	Commander of 87. Infanterie-Division; 16 January 1945 – 8 May 1945	Succeeded by None
