= Werner Ranck =

- Born: 25 October 1904; Hamburg, German Empire
- Died: 7 December 1989 (aged 85); Hamburg, West Germany
- Spouse(s): ∞ 1933 Irmgard Margarete Johanna Hedwig Elisabeth von Bardeleben (1907–1998); 3 children
- Military career
- Allegiance: Weimar Republic; Nazi Germany
- Branch: Reichswehr; Army
- Service years: 1924–1945
- Rank: Generalleutnant
- Commands: 121st Infantry Division; 218th Infantry Division
- Conflicts: World War II: Invasion of Poland; Siege of Warsaw (1939); Battle of France; Battle of Dunkirk; Operation Barbarossa; Siege of Leningrad; Courland Pocket
- Awards: Iron Cross; German Cross in Gold; Knight's Cross of the Iron Cross

Werner Karl Otto Leopold Ranck (25 October 1904 – 7 December 1989) was a general in the Wehrmacht of Nazi Germany during World War II. He was a recipient of the Knight's Cross of the Iron Cross, awarded by for successful military leadership.

Ranck, promoted to Generalleutnant in April 1945, surrendered to the Soviet forces in May 1945 in the Courland Pocket. Routinely convicted as a "war criminal" in the Soviet Union, he was held until 1955.

== Promotions ==
- 1 April 1924 Kandidat (Officer Candidate)
- 1 July 1925 Fahnenjunker-Gefreiter (Officer Candidate with Lance Corporal rank)
- 1 November 1925 Fahnenjunker-Unteroffizier (Officer Candidate with Corporal/NCO/Junior Sergeant rank)
- 1 September 1926 Fähnrich (Officer Cadet)
- 10 August 1927 Oberfähnrich (Senior Officer Cadet) with effect from 1 August 1927
- 20 December 1927 Leutnant (2nd Lieutenant) with effect from 1 December 1927
- 1 August 1930 Oberleutnant (1st Lieutenant)
- 20 April 1935 Hauptmann (Captain) with effect and Rank Seniority (RDA) from 1 May 1935
- 14 September 1940 Major with effect and RDA from 1 October 1940
  - 18 March 1941 received new RDA from 1 February 1940
- 16 March 1942 Oberstleutnant (Lieutenant Colonel) with effect and RDA from 1 April 1942
- 20 April 1943 Oberst (Colonel) with effect and RDA from 1 March 1943
- 1 October 1944 Generalmajor (Major General)
- 15 April 1945 Generalleutnant (Lieutenant General) with effect and RDA from 20 April 1943 (order signed by General Burgdorf on 7 April 1945)

== Awards and decorations ==
- DRA/Reich Sports Badge in Bronze on 1 August 1928
- Wehrmacht Long Service Award, 4th to 3rd Class on 2 October 1936
- Iron Cross (1939)
  - 2nd Class on 23 May 1940
  - 1st Class on 29 June 1940
- Order of the Crown of Romania, Commander's Cross with Swords on the ribbon "für militärische Tapferkeit" (for military bravery) on 9 August 1941
- Winter Battle in the East 1941–42 Medal on 15 July 1942
- Crimea Shield on 23 August 1942
- German Cross in Gold on 10 February 1944
- Reference in the Wehrmachtbericht on 21 September 1944
- Honour Roll Clasp of the Army on 15 October 1944
- Knight's Cross of the Iron Cross on 2 March 1945 as Generalmajor and commander of 121. Infanterie-Division

Military offices
Preceded by General der Infanterie Theodor Busse	Commander of 121. Infanterie-Division; 1 August 1944 – 30 April 1945	Succeeded by Generalmajor Ottomar Hansen
Preceded by Generalmajor Ingo von Collani	Commander of 218. Infanterie-Division; 1 May 1945 – 8 May 1945	Succeeded by None
