= 126th Infantry Division (Wehrmacht) =

- German: 126. Infanterie-Division
- Insignia of the 126th Infantry Division
- Active: 1940 – 1945
- Country: Nazi Germany
- Branch: Army
- Type: Infantry
- Size: Division
- Engagements: World War II: Siege of Leningrad; Demyansk Pocket; Courland pocket

Commanders
- 1940–42: Paul Laux
- 1942–43, 1943: Harry Hoppe
- 1943: Friedrich Hofmann
- 1943–45: Gotthard Fischer
- 1945: Kurt Hähling

The 126th Infantry Division (German: 126. Infanterie-Division) was a German division in World War II. It was formed on 18 October 1940 in Sennelager.

The division was formed from elements of the 11th Infantry Division, 253rd Infantry Division and the non-motorized elements of the 16th Motorized Infantry Division. It fought at Demyansk, Staraya Russia and Leningrad before ending the war in the Courland Pocket.

== Commmanders ==
- General der Infanterie Paul Laux (5 October 1940 – 10 October 1942)
- Generalleutnant Harry Hoppe (10 October 1942 – 31 April 1943)
- Generalleutnant Friedrich Hofmann (31 April 1943 – 8 July 1943)
- Generalleutnant Harry Hoppe (8 July 1943 – 7 November 1943)
- Generalleutnant Gotthard Fischer (7 November 1943 – 5 January 1945)
- Generalmajor Kurt Hähling (5 January 1945 – 8 May 1945)

== Order of battle ==
=== 1940 ===
- Infantry Regiment 422
- Infantry Regiment 424
- Infantry Regiment 426
- Artillery Regiment 126
- Divisions Units 126

=== 1943 ===
- Grenadier Regiment 422
- Grenadier Regiment 424
- Grenadier Regiment 426
- Divisions Fusilier Battalion 126
- Artillery Regiment 126
- Divisions Units 126

== See also ==
- List of German Divisions in World War II
