= 30th Infantry Division (Wehrmacht) =

30. Infanterie-Division; German 30th Infantry Division
- Active: 1 October 1936 — 8 May 1945
- Country: Nazi Germany
- Branch: Army
- Type: Infantry
- Size: Division
- Engagements: World War II: Invasion of Poland; Battle of France; Operation Barbarossa; Demyansk Pocket; Courland Pocket

Commanders
- Notable commanders: Carl-Heinrich von Stülpnagel

The 30th Infantry Division (German: 30. Infanterie-Division) of the Wehrmacht was created on 1 October 1936 in Lübeck and mobilized on 26 August 1939 for the upcoming invasion of Poland. At that time, it consisted of the usual German infantry division elements: three infantry regiments of three battalions each, one three-battalion regiment of light artillery, one battalion of heavy artillery, a panzerjager (anti-tank) battalion, an aufklärungs (reconnaissance) battalion, a signals battalion, a pioneer (engineer) battalion, and divisional supply, medical, and administrative units.

Just prior to the invasion of Poland, the division was positioned on the left wing of Army Group South under the X Army Corps. It was to attack in the general direction of the area in front of Łódź. It fought battles in areas of Kalisch, during the Vistula crossing at Warta, also at Kol. Balin, Niewiesz and Uniejew. During the Battle of Bzura they suffered heavy losses, including 1500 POWs captured by the Poles. They had to reject violent counterattacks and attempts to escape by the trapped Polish troops. Their commander Major General von Briesen personally led his last held in reserve battalion into battle and was seriously wounded and lost his right forearm. The Division, henceforth was referred to as "Briesen Division". After the Battle of Bzura was over, the division moved north of Lowicz in pursuit of the defeated enemy.

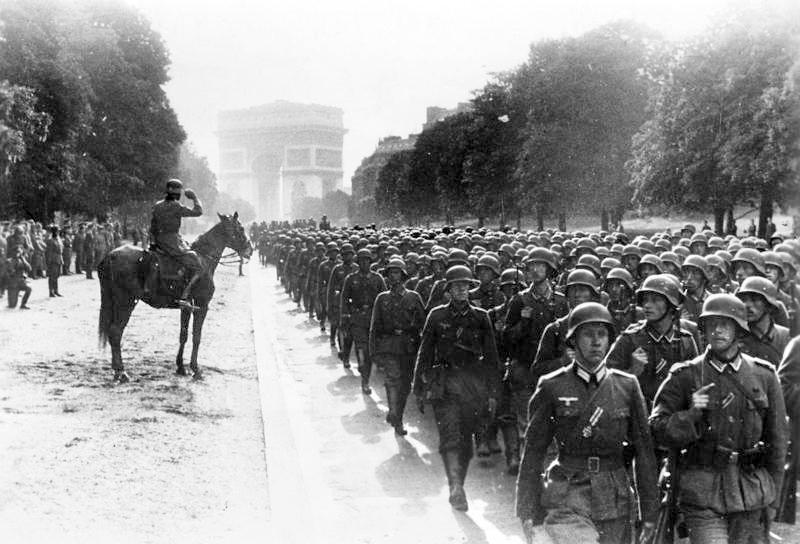
30th Infantry units march through Paris before Kurt von Briesen (on horse), 1940.

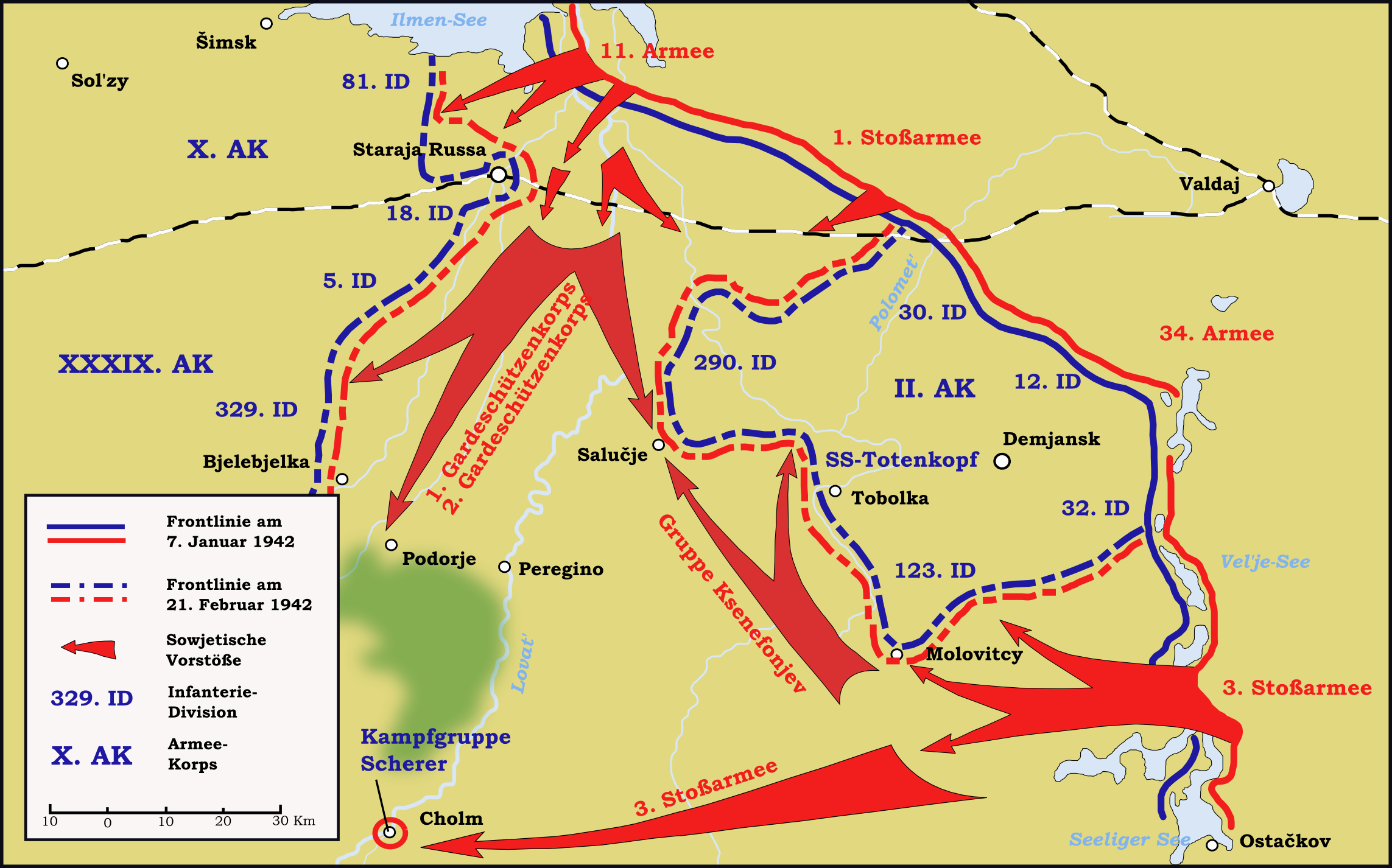
Offensive of the Red Army south of Lake Ilmen, 7 January–21 February 1942

On 16 June 1940, the unit conducted a victory parade in Paris.

The division was then stationed in Normandy until June 1941 where it, and its corps (X corps) went to participate in Operation Barbarossa.

In the winter of 1941 the division was trapped in the Demyansk Pocket along with the 12th, 32nd, 123rd and 290th infantry divisions, and the SS-Division Totenkopf, as well as RAD, police, Todt organization and other auxiliary units, for a total of about 90,000 German troops and around 10,000 auxiliaries. Their commander was General der Infanterie Walter Graf von Brockdorff-Ahlefeldt, commander of the II. Armeekorps (2nd Army Corps).

== Commanders ==
- Generalleutnant Carl-Heinrich von Stülpnagel, creation – 4 February 1938
- Generalmajor Kurt von Briesen, 4 February 1938 – 1 July 1939
- Generalleutnant Franz Böhme, 1 July 1939 – 19 July 1939
- General der Infanterie Kurt von Briesen, 19 July 1939 – 25 November 1940
- Generalmajor Walter Buechs, November 1940 – 5 January 1941
- General der Infanterie Kurt von Tippelskirch, 5 January 1941 – 5 June 1942
- Generalleutnant Thomas-Emil von Wickede, 5. Juni 1942 – 29 October 1943
- Generalleutnant Paul Winter, September 1943
- Generalmajor Gerhard Henke (acting), 29 October 1943 – 5 November 1943
- General der Infanterie Wilhelm Haase, 5 November 1943 – 15 March 1944
- Generalleutnant Hans von Basse (acting), 15 March 1944 – 15 August 1944
- Generalmajor Otto Barth, 15 August 1944 – 30 January 1945
- Generalleutnant Albert Henze, 30 January 1945 – capitulation
