= Otto Barth (general) =

German general (1891–1963)

- Born: 18 June 1891
- Died: 3 May 1963 (aged 71)
- Military career
- Allegiance: Nazi Germany
- Branch: Army (Wehrmacht)
- Rank: Generalmajor
- Commands: 30th Infantry Division; 21st Luftwaffe Division
- Conflicts: Courland Pocket
- Awards: Knight's Cross of the Iron Cross

Otto Barth (18 June 1891 – 3 May 1963) was a German general in the Wehrmacht during World War II who commanded several divisions. He was a recipient of the Knight's Cross of the Iron Cross.

Barth surrendered to the Red Army in the Courland Pocket at the end of the war. Convicted as a war criminal in the Soviet Union, he was held until 1955.

== Awards and decorations ==
- German Cross in Gold on 9 October 1942 as Oberst in Artillerie-Regiment 117
- Knight's Cross of the Iron Cross on 8 May 1943 as Oberst and commander of Artillerie-Regiment 117

Military offices
Preceded by Generalleutnant Hans von Basse	Commander of 30. Infanterie-Division; 15 August 1944 – 30 January 1945	Succeeded by Generalleutnant Albert Henze
Preceded by Generalleutnant Albert Henze	Commander of 21. Luftwaffen-Feld-Division; 16 February 1945 – 8 May 1945	Succeeded by None
