= Albert Henze =

- Born: 7 August 1894
- Died: 31 March 1979 (aged 84)
- Military career
- Allegiance: German Empire; Weimar Republic; Nazi Germany
- Branch: German Army
- Service years: 1914–1945
- Rank: Generalleutnant
- Commands: Panzer-Grenadier-Division Feldherrnhalle; 19th Luftwaffen Division; 21st Feld Division (L); 30th Infantry Division
- Conflicts: World War I; World War II; Invasion of Poland; Battle of France; Battle of Voronezh (1942); Third Battle of Kharkov; Battle of Kursk; Cherkassy Pocket; Battle of Narva (1944); Italian Campaign; Riga Offensive (1944); Courland Pocket
- Awards: Knight's Cross of the Iron Cross with Oak Leaves

Albert Henze (7 August 1894 – 31 March 1979) was a general who commanded several divisions in the Wehrmacht of Nazi Germany during World War II. He was a recipient of the Knight's Cross of the Iron Cross with Oak Leaves. Henze surrendered to the Soviet forces in the Courland Pocket and was held as a war criminal in the Soviet Union until 1955.

== Awards and decorations ==
- Iron Cross (1914) 2nd Class (27 July 1916) & 1st Class (27 January 1918)
- Clasp to the Iron Cross (1939) 2nd Class (2 October 1939) & 1st Class (12 July 1940)
- Honour Roll Clasp of the Army (18 August 1943)
- German Cross in Gold on 2 March 1943 as Oberst in Panzergrenadier-Regiment 110
- Knight's Cross of the Iron Cross with Oak Leaves
  - Knight's Cross on 15 January 1944 as Oberst and commander of Panzergrenadier-Regiment 110
  - 709th Oak Leaves on 21 January 1945 as Generalmajor and commander of Gruppe Henze (FeldDiv 21 (L))

Military offices
Preceded by Generalleutnant Otto Kohlermann	Commander of Panzergrenadier-Division Feldherrnhalle; 13 February 1944 - 3 April 1944	Succeeded by Generalmajor Friedrich-Carl von Steinkeller
Preceded by Generalleutnant Erich Baessler	Commander of 19. Luftwaffen-Sturm-Division; 1 June 1944 - July 1944	Succeeded by none
Preceded by Generalleutnant Rudolf-Eduard Licht	Commander of 21. Luftwaffen Feld-Division; 30 August 1944 - 30 January 1945	Succeeded by Generalmajor Otto Barth
Preceded by Generalmajor Otto Barth	Commander of 30. Infanterie-Division; 30 January - 8 May 1945	Succeeded by none
