= 563rd Volksgrenadier Division =

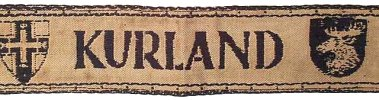
- Kurland cuff
- Active: 1944-1945
- Disbanded: 1945
- Country: Nazi Germany
- Branch: Army
- Type: Infantry
- Size: Division

Commanders
- Notable commanders: Ferdinand Brühl; Werner Neumann

The 563rd Volksgrenadier Division was a volksgrenadier division of the German Army during the Second World War, active from 1944 to 1945.

The division was formed in October 1944 in Norway, by redesignating the 563rd Grenadier Division, under the command of Ferdinand Brühl. It contained the 1147th, 1148th and 1149th Grenadier Regiments, and the 1563rd Artillery Regiment.

The division was caught in the Kurland Pocket, and fought there until the end of the war, surrendering along with its II Army Corps sister 263rd Infantry Division to 16th Rifle Division.

On 1st April 1945 the division was formed by:

- 1148th Volksgrenadier Regiment (I. & II. battalions + 13. company)
- 1149th Volksgrenadier Regiment (I. & II. battalions + 13. company)
- 1563rd Artillery Regiment (I. (1 battery 7,5 cm & 2 batteries 10,5 cm), II. (1 battery 15 cm & 2 batteries 10,5 cm) & III. (1 battery 7,5 cm & 2 batteries 10,5 cm) battalions)
- Antitank Battalion
- Pionier Battalion (2 companies)
- Division Combat School (1 company)
