= Walther Risse =

German general (1892–1965)

- Born: 13 December 1892; Geithain, German Empire
- Died: 21 June 1965 (aged 72); Hamburg, West Germany
- Military career
- Allegiance: German Empire (to 1918); Weimar Republic (to 1933); Nazi Germany (to 1945)
- Branch: Army (Wehrmacht)
- Service years: 1914-1945
- Rank: Generalleutnant
- Commands: 225th Infantry Division
- Conflicts: World War I World War II
- Awards: Knight's Cross of the Iron Cross with Oak Leaves

Walther Risse (13 December 1892 – 21 June 1965) was a German general in the Wehrmacht who commanded the 225th Infantry Division. He was a recipient of the Knight's Cross of the Iron Cross with Oak Leaves of Nazi Germany.

== Awards and decorations ==
- Clasp to the Iron Cross (1939) 2nd Class (15 May 1940) & 1st Class (4 June 1940)
- German Cross in Gold on 30 September 1944 as Generalleutnant and commander of 225. Infanterie Division
- Knight's Cross of the Iron Cross with Oak Leaves
  - Knight's Cross on 22 September 1941 as Oberst and commander of Infanterie-Regiment 474
  - Oak Leaves on 18 January 1945 as Generalleutnant and commander of 225. Infanterie Division
