= Military career of Adolf Hitler =

Adolf Hitler
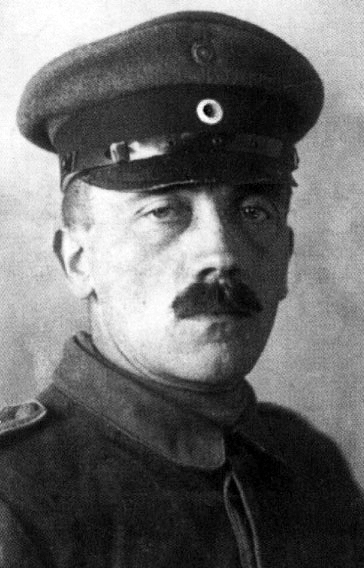
- Hitler in uniform c. 1921–1924
- Military career
- Allegiance: German Empire (1914–1918); Kingdom of Bavaria; Weimar Republic (1918–1920); Nazi Germany (1933–1945)
- Branch: Imperial German Army; Bavarian Army; Reichsheer
- Service years: 1914–1920 (as soldier); 1939–1945 (as commander-in-chief)
- Rank: Gefreiter
- Unit: 16th Bavarian Reserve Infantry Regiment
- Conflicts: World War I; Western Front (World War I); First Battle of Ypres; Second Battle of Ypres; Battle of the Somme (WIA); Battle of Fromelles; Battle of Arras; Battle of Passchendaele; World War II
- Awards: Iron Cross First Class; Iron Cross Second Class; Wound Badge; Honor Cross 1914–1918; Bavarian Cross of Military Merit, Third Class with Swords; Bavarian Medal of Military Service, Third Class; Regimental Diploma (Regiment "List")

The military career of Adolf Hitler, who was the dictator of Germany from 1933 until 1945, can be divided into two distinct portions of his life. Mainly, the period during World War I when Hitler served as a Gefreiter (lance corporal (Note: As a Gefreiter, Hitler wore one stripe on his uniform, the rank being the result of his sole promotion, from his initial rank of private. Most English-language sources refer to Hitler as "lance corporal" or "corporal", while occasionally a source – such as Volker Ullrich in his biography of Hitler, in the English translation from German by Jefferson Chase – chose to use "private first class" or "private".)) in the Bavarian Army, and the era of World War II when he served as the Supreme Commander-in-Chief of the Wehrmacht (German Armed Forces) through his position as Führer of Nazi Germany.

== Evasion of military service in the Austro-Hungarian Army ==
In Vienna, where he had been living in relative poverty since 1907, Hitler received the final part of his father's estate in May 1913 and moved to Munich in the German Empire, where he earned money painting architectural scenes. He may have left Vienna to evade conscription into the Austro-Hungarian Army. The Austro-Hungarian military subsequently deemed him "stellungsflüchtig", meaning that he had purposefully evaded the aptitude tests for conscription. He was wanted by the police and eventually located in Munich, where authorities demanded that he present himself at the local Austro-Hungarian consulate. Hitler did as he was told, but told the consul a variety of reasons for being unable to enlist in the Austro-Hungarian military, including poverty, illnesses, and other troubles. The consul pitied him and decided to ignore regulations, thus not ordering Hitler's extradition. Regardless, it was decided to again check Hitler's case in Austria. The Bavarian police thus sent him back to Salzburg for another induction into the Austro-Hungarian Army, but he failed his physical exam on 5 February 1914 and returned to Munich.

According to historian Henrik Eberle, Hitler probably evaded conscription into the Austro-Hungarian Army due to his growing disdain for Austria-Hungary's nature as a multi-ethnic state. Contemporary witnesses such as one of Hitler's superiors in World War I, Max Amann, later reported that he was not yet as politically extreme as he later became. Regardless, Hitler already showcased a commitment to hardline German nationalism and a strong dislike for non-German groups in Austria such as the Czechs in Vienna. Upon the outbreak of World War I, Hitler was thus an early, fervent supporter of the Imperial German Army.

== First World War ==
=== Early service and First Battle of Ypres ===
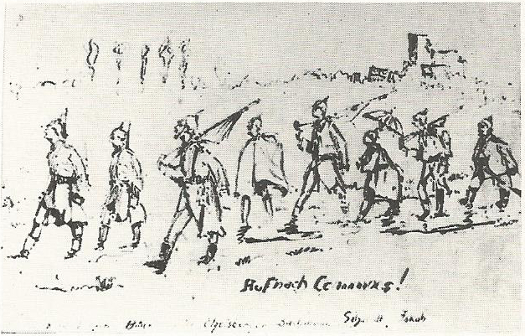
Caricature by Hitler, portraying himself (3rd from left) among his comrades, c. 1914–1915

Hitler was 25 years old in August 1914, when Austria-Hungary and the German Empire entered the First World War. He greeted the war's outbreak on 2 August with enthusiasm, and tried to enlist in the Imperial German Army two days after the conflict's start. However, he was initially sent away as the military had no need for more volunteers at the time. On 16 August, he was ordered to report at Munich's recruit depot. Because of his Austrian citizenship, he had to request permission to serve in the Bavarian Army. Permission was granted. On the evidence of a report by the Bavarian authorities in 1924, which questioned how Hitler was allowed to serve in the Bavarian Army, Hitler almost certainly was enlisted through an error on the part of the government. The authorities could not explain why he was not deported back to Austria in 1914 after he failed his physical exam for the Austrian Army. They concluded that the matter of Hitler's citizenship was simply not raised; thus he was allowed to enter the Bavarian Army. In the army, Hitler continued to put forth his German nationalist ideas which he developed from a young age.

After enlisting, Hitler was assigned to the Bavarian Reserve Infantry Regiment 16 (1st Company of the List Regiment) which would serve in France and Belgium during the war. By the time Hitler reached the front lines, the early German advances on the Western Front had already been blunted, but the conflict had not yet entered its full trench warfare stage. Hitler first saw combat during the First Battle of Ypres (October 1914), which Germans later remembered as the Kindermord bei Ypern (Massacre of the Innocents at Ypres) because approximately 40,000 men (between a third and a half, many of them university students) of nine newly enlisted infantry divisions became casualties in the first twenty days. Serving as an infantryman in the 1st Company, Hitler first encountered enemies on 29 October 1914 when the Reserve Infantry Regiment 16 ran into an entrenched but heavily depleted Scottish unit. He later recounted that the morale of his unit was very high at the time, as he and his comrades did not truly understand the true dangers of battle. The Bavarians easily overran the Scottish force in a charge, but their temper cooled after they started to suffer their first losses.

The German units in the area then kept advancing, but soon stalled as they ran into more numerous and well camouflaged English positions. Having overcome three trench lines, the Bavarians eventually stopped at a small forest, later dubbed the "Bayernwald" ("Bavarians' forest") by its new occupants. At this point, the Entente launched a heavy artillery barrage, forcing Hitler's unit to seek shelter in a nearby trench system where he and his comrades engaged more Allied troops. The Bavarians then sought to capture a number of farmsteads, but Hitler was initially sent back to the "Bavarians' forest" to collect stragglers. Upon his return, he joined the fight for the farmsteads. After a three-hour-long battle, the houses were captured, with Hitler narrowly avoiding being shot in his right arm.

After spending the night in the farmsteads, the Bavarian Reserve Infantry Regiment 16 was ordered to renew its attacks. Unlike their operations on the first day, the Bavarians made few tangible gains this time. Instead, they suffered heavy losses; Hitler would never write of his experiences on this day. He initially took part in some unsuccessful assaults, and was then ordered to stay in reserve with some other troops as the rest of the regiment attacked the small town Gheluvelt. After four days, the regiment retreated from the settlement. At this point, the Bavarian Reserve Infantry Regiment 16 had suffered about 75% casualties, with 725 active soldiers out of 3000 original troops being left. Hitler and some of his comrades would later portray the clash at Gheluvelt as a heroic event, but other survivors regarded it as just terrible. By December, Hitler's own company of 250 was reduced to 42. Biographer John Keegan claims that this experience drove Hitler to become aloof and withdrawn for the remaining years of war. After the battle, Hitler was promoted from Schütze (private) to Gefreiter (lance corporal). He was assigned to be a regimental message-runner.

By late 1914, the Western Front had become largely frozen in place. In contemporary letters, Hitler expressed frustration about the developing trench warfare. He admitted that the constant artillery shelling disquieted even those with high morale, while much of the land had been turned into devastated, inhospitable no man's land. Regardless, he remained convinced of a German victory, expressing hope for some kind of grand offensive in the near future.

=== Assessment of service and lifestyle during the war ===
Hitler (farthest left at bottom row) posing with other German soldiers and their dog Fuchsl

Hitler considered the war the best years of his life. He was described by other soldiers as aloof, quiet, and a loner, never receiving mail from home, but regularly reading pamphlets and literature. Hitler often expressed outrage at his fellow soldiers visiting French prostitutes, both for their nationality as well as the immorality of the act. However, despite them considering him odd, Hitler was liked and accepted by his peers. His letters also began to contain political, right-wing commentary by late 1914; he mused about the necessity to purge Germany of "Fremdländerei" (foreign influences) and the destruction of internationalism. These he considered more important than any territorial conquests.

Some have regarded his assignment as a regimental message-runner as "a relatively safe job", because regimental headquarters were often several miles behind the front. According to Thomas Weber, earlier historians of the period had not distinguished between regimental runners, who were based away from the front "in relative comfort", and company, or battalion runners, who moved among the trenches and were more often under fire. Messengers' duties changed as the German Army on the Western Front settled into their defensive positions as a result of the ongoing stalemate. Fewer messages went by foot or bicycle and more by telephone. Hitler's circle of comrades also served at headquarters. They laughed at "Adi" for his aversion to smutty stories, and traded their jam rations for his tobacco. (Note: Two of them joined him in 1940 after the victory over France and the Low Countries for a nostalgic tour of their old haunts in Flanders.)

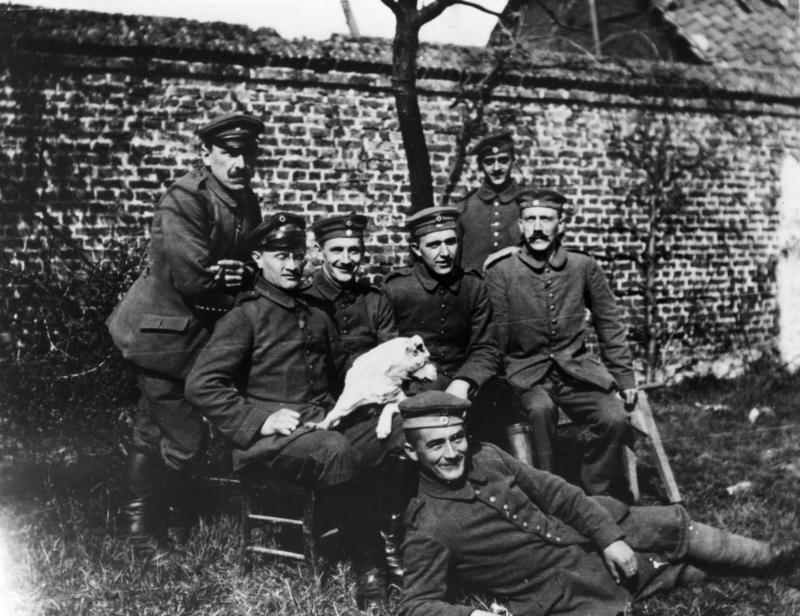
Hitler sitting at far right among soldiers of the "List" regiment and Fuchsl

In early 1915, Gefreiter Hitler adopted a stray dog he named Fuchsl (Little Fox), who was taught many tricks and became his companion. Hitler described him as a "proper circus dog". In August 1917 the List Regiment transferred to a quiet sector of the front in Alsace. During the journey, both Fuchsl and Hitler's portfolio of sketches and paintings were stolen. Hitler, though heartbroken by his loss, did take his first leave, which consisted of an 18-day visit to Berlin where he stayed with the family of a comrade.

At the Nuremberg Trials, two of his former superiors testified that Hitler had refused to be considered for promotion. (Note: Compare:Koebner, Thomas, ed. (1989). "Bruder Hitler": Autoren des Exils und des Widerstands sehen den "Führer" des Dritten Reiches ['Brother Hitler': Authors of the exile and of the resistance on the 'Fuhrer' of the Third Reich]. Heyne Sachbuch. Heyne. p. 21. ISBN 9783453033856. "Frage: Warum ist dieser 'Führer' viereinhalb Kriegsjahre lang ewig nur Gefreiter geblieben? Es war Mangel an Unteroffizieren; trotzdem sagte sein Kompanieführer: 'Diesen Hysteriker mache ich niemals zum Unteroffizier!' [Question: Why did this 'Fuehrer' remain a mere Lance-Corporal for four and a half long years of war? There was a shortage of non-commissioned officers; nevertheless his company commander said: 'I will never make this hysterical man a non-com!']") Hitler was twice decorated for bravery. He received the Iron Cross Second Class in 1914 and the Iron Cross First Class in 1918, an honour rarely given to a lance corporal. Hitler's First Class Iron Cross was recommended by Lieutenant Hugo Gutmann, a Jewish adjutant in the List Regiment. According to Weber, this rare award was commonly awarded to those posted to regimental headquarters, such as Hitler, who had contact with more senior officers than did combat soldiers. Hitler's Iron Cross First Class was awarded after an attack in open warfare during which messengers were indispensable and on a day in which the depleted regiment lost 60 killed and 211 wounded.

Hitler was an excellent marksman. After he became leader of Germany, Pierre Huss witnessed him twice shooting a snowball in the air with his Luger pistol. Hitler boasted "I am a better pistol shot" than most of the top Waffen-SS and German Army marksmen.

=== 1916–1918 ===
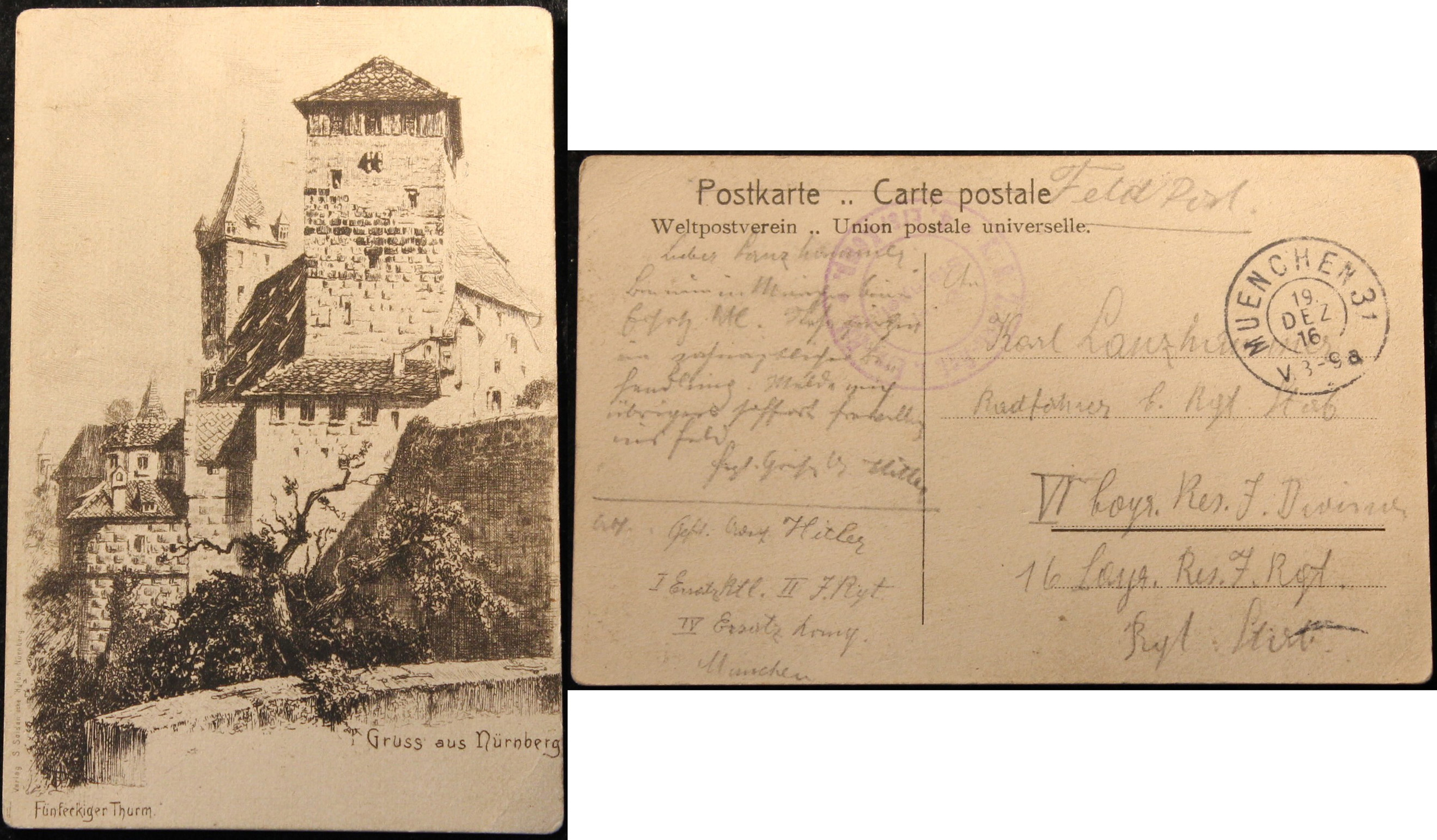
Postcard sent by Hitler from Munich on 19 December 1916, where he explains how he wants to participate in the battles of the First World War voluntarily

Hitler subsequently fought in the Battle of the Somme (1916), the Battle of Arras (1917), and the Battle of Passchendaele (1917). During the Battle of Fromelles on 19–20 July 1916 the Australians, mounting their first attack in France, assaulted the Bavarian positions. The Bavarians repulsed the attackers, who suffered the second-highest losses they had on any day on the Western Front, about 7,000 men. The history of the List Regiment hailed this brilliant defense as the "personification of the German Army on the Western Front".

During the Battle of the Somme in October 1916 Hitler was wounded in his left thigh when a shell exploded at the entrance to the dispatch runners' dugout. After initially being treated at a field hospital, Hitler was sent for almost two months to the Red Cross hospital at Beelitz near Berlin. Thereafter, he was ordered to the depot in Munich. He wrote to his commanding officer, Hauptmann Fritz Wiedemann, asking that he be recalled to the regiment because he could not tolerate Munich when he knew his comrades were at the Front. Wiedemann arranged for Hitler's return to his regiment on 5 March 1917.

On 15 October 1918, he and several comrades were temporarily blinded—and according to Friedelind Wagner, Hitler also lost his voice—due to a British mustard gas attack. After initial treatment, Hitler was hospitalized in Pasewalk in Pomerania. While there, on 10 November, Hitler learned of Germany's defeat from a pastor, and—by his own account—on receiving this news he suffered a second bout of blindness. In Mein Kampf Hitler wrote that this was the moment he decided to become a politician: "When I was confined to bed, the idea came to me that I would liberate Germany, that I would make it great. I knew immediately that it would be realized." However, it is unlikely that he committed himself to a career in politics at that point in time. Hitler was outraged by the subsequent Treaty of Versailles (1919), which forced Germany to accept responsibility for starting the war, deprived Germany of various territories, demilitarised the Rhineland (which the Allies occupied), and imposed economically damaging sanctions.

On 19 November 1918, Hitler was discharged from the Pasewalk hospital and returned to Munich. Arriving on 21 November, he was assigned to 7th Company of the 1st Replacement Battalion of the 2nd Infantry Regiment. In December he was reassigned to a Prisoner of War camp in Traunstein as a guard. There he would stay until the camp dissolved in January 1919. (Note: Guard duty at a POW camp to the East, near the Austrian border. The prisoners were Russian, and Hitler had volunteered for the posting. Shirer 1960, p. 34; Toland 1976, p. xx.)

He returned to Munich and spent a few months in barracks waiting for reassignment. Munich, then part of the People's State of Bavaria, was in a state of chaos with a number of assassinations occurring, including that of socialist Kurt Eisner (Note: As a socialist journalist, Eisner organised the Socialist Revolution that overthrew the Wittelsbach monarchy in Bavaria in November 1918, which led to his being described as "the symbol of the Bavarian revolution".) who was shot dead in Munich by a German nationalist on 21 February 1919. His rival Erhard Auer was also wounded in an attack. Other acts of violence were the killings of both Major Paul Ritter von Jahreiß and the conservative MP Heinrich Osel. In this political turmoil, Berlin sent in the military–called the "White Guards of Capitalism" by the communists. On 3 April 1919, Hitler was elected as the liaison of his military battalion and again on 15 April. During this time he urged his unit to stay out of the fighting and not join either side. The Bavarian Soviet Republic was officially crushed on 6 May 1919, when Lt. General Burghard von Oven and his military forces declared the city secure. In the aftermath of arrests and executions, Hitler denounced a fellow liaison, Georg Dufter, as a Soviet "radical rabble-rouser." Other testimony he gave to the military board of inquiry allowed them to root out other members of the military that "had been infected with revolutionary fervor." For his anti-communist views he was allowed to avoid discharge when his unit was disbanded in May 1919.

=== Impact of World War I on Hitler's military thinking ===
Historian Steven J. Zaloga argued that Hitler was strongly influenced in his military vision by his experiences during World War I. This manifested in Hitler's belief in the importance of will and morale for victory, as he –like many other Germans of his generation– believed the stab-in-the-back myth. Accordingly, he became convinced that Germany could win World War II as long as it maintained its willingness to fight.

Furthermore, Hitler's military thinking was also influenced by the perceived achievements of Erich Ludendorff, one of the leading German commanders of World War I. After World War I, Hitler temporarily became Ludendorff's "protégé"; historian Jay Lockenour argued that the two men were similar as they "had very little sense for the relationship between politics and strategy". Even after Hitler and Ludendorff split over political and ideological disputes, the former reportedly maintained affection for Ludendorff. During Operation Barbarossa, Hitler expressed admiration for Ludendorff's past strategies and his ability to win a "Vernichtungsschlacht" (battle of annihilation) at Tannenberg in 1914, claiming that Operation Barbarossa would be similar yet on a vastly greater scale.

== Army intelligence agent ==
In June 1919 he was moved to the demobilization office of the 2nd Infantry Regiment. (Note: John Toland suggests that Hitler's assignment to this department was partially a reward for his "exemplary" service in the front lines, and partially because the responsible officer felt sorry for Hitler as having no friends, but being very willing to do whatever the army required. Toland 1976, p. xx.) Around this time the German military command released an edict that the army's main priority was to "carry out, in conjunction with the police, stricter surveillance of the population ... so that the ignition of any new unrest can be discovered and extinguished." In May 1919 Karl Mayr became commander of the 6th Battalion of the guards regiment in Munich and from 30 May as head of the "Education and Propaganda Department" (Dept Ib/P) of the Bavarian Reichswehr, Headquarters 4. In this capacity as head of the intelligence department, Mayr recruited Hitler as an undercover agent in early June 1919. Under Captain Mayr, "national thinking" courses were arranged at the Reichswehrlager Lechfeld near Augsburg, with Hitler attending from 10 to 19 July. These courses were primarily designed to educate on German history, the course of the War, and to stem the spread of Bolshevism. During this time Hitler impressed Mayr. Hitler himself realised during these courses that he had a particular oratory strength, regularly making anti-Semitic speeches. Mayr assigned Hitler to an anti-bolshevik "educational commando" as one of 26 instructors in the summer of 1919. (Note: Apparently someone in an army "educational session" had made a remark that Hitler deemed "pro-Jewish" and Hitler reacted with characteristic ferocity. Shirer states that Hitler had attracted the attention of a right-wing university professor who was engaged to educate enlisted men in "proper" political belief, and that the professor's recommendation to an officer resulted in Hitler's advancement. Shirer 1960, p. 35. "I was offered the opportunity of speaking before a larger audience; and ... it was now corroborated: I could 'speak.' No task could make me happier than this; ... I was able to perform useful services to ... the army. ... [I]n ... my lectures I led many hundreds ... of comrades back to their people and fatherland." Hitler 1999, pp. 215–216.)

As an appointed Verbindungsmann (intelligence agent) of an Aufklärungskommando (reconnaissance commando) of the Reichswehr, Hitler's job was to influence other soldiers and to infiltrate the German Workers' Party (DAP). While monitoring the activities of the DAP, Hitler became attracted to the founder Anton Drexler's antisemitic, nationalist, anti-capitalist, and anti-Marxist ideas. Impressed with Hitler's oratory skills, Drexler invited him to join the DAP, which Hitler did on 12 September 1919.

== Dictatorship and German rearmament ==
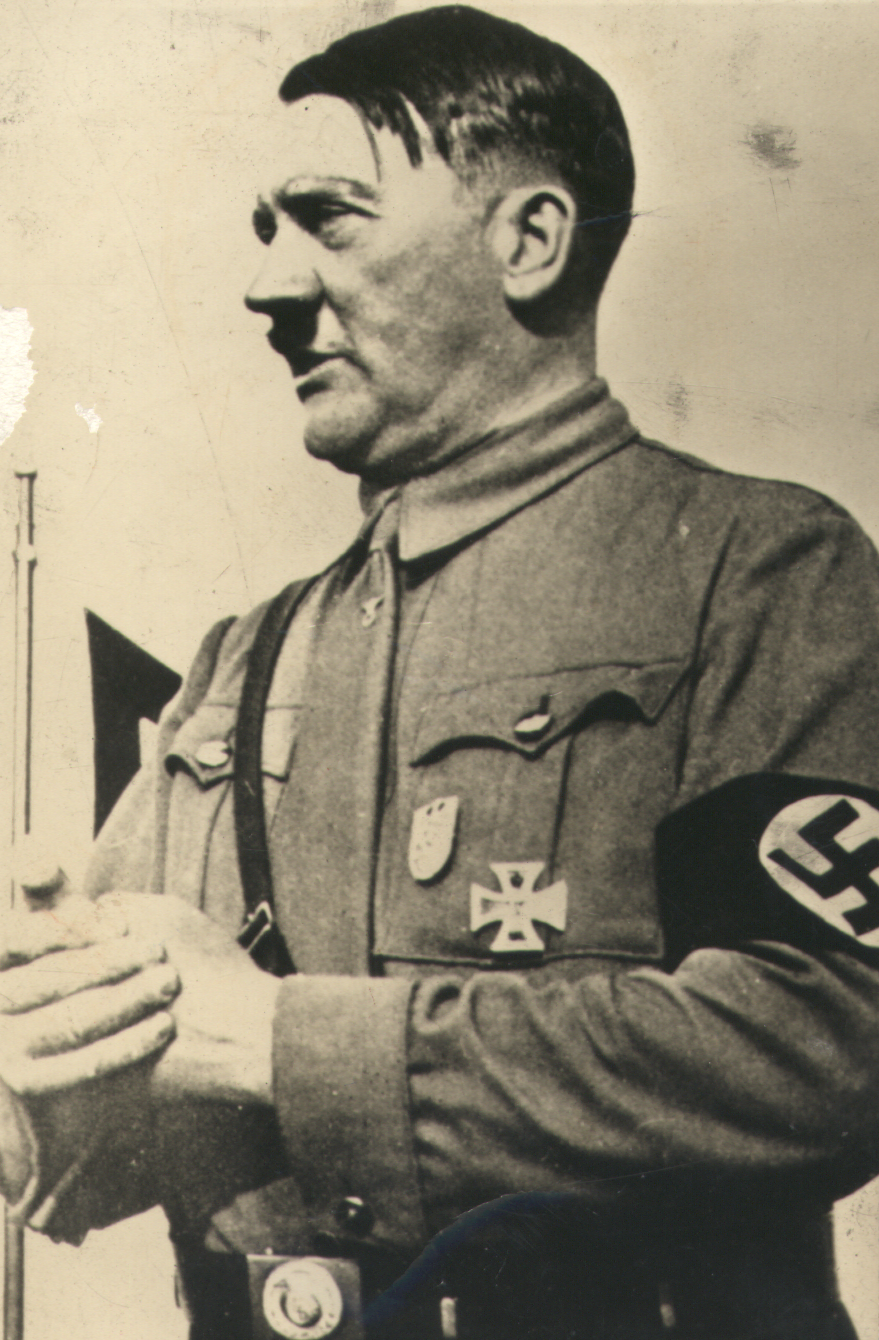
Hitler in his brownshirt SA uniform wearing the Nuremberg Party Day Badge and his World War I Iron Cross

Six days after being sworn in as Chancellor in 1933, Hitler met with the German military leaders, declaring that his first priority was rearmament. The new Defense Minister, General Werner von Blomberg, introduced Nazi principles into the armed forces, emphasizing the concept of Volksgemeinschaft (national community), in which Germans were united in a classless society. "The uniform makes all men equal." Military rank specified a chain of command, not class boundaries. Officers were instructed to mingle with other ranks. Blomberg's decree on the army and National Socialism on 25 May 1934 ordered: "When non-commissioned officers and men take part in any festivity, care must be taken that the officers do not all sit together. I request that this guidance be given the most serious attention." The rapidly expanding armed forces enlisted many new officers and men from the Hitler Youth. The American William L. Shirer reported that all ranks ate the same rations, socialized when off duty, and that officers were concerned with their men's personal problems.

On 1 August 1934, a new law stated that on Hindenburg's death the presidency would be abolished, and its powers merged with those of the Chancellor. From that day onward, Hitler would be known as Führer and Reich Chancellor. As head of state, Hitler became supreme commander of all armed forces. Hindenburg died the following day. (The new office was confirmed by a plebiscite on 19 August 1934.) Blomberg, on his own initiative, introduced the Oath of 2 August 1934: "I swear by God this sacred oath that I will render unconditional obedience to the Führer of the German Reich and people, Adolf Hitler, the commander in chief of the armed forces, and, as a brave soldier, will be prepared at all times to stake my life for this oath." (In 1939, God was removed from the oath.) The Reichswehr was reorganized as the Wehrmacht on 21 May 1935, bringing the army, navy and air force under unified command.

Hitler guided the steps of their rearmament, thanks to his retentive memory and interest in technical questions. General Alfred Jodl wrote that Hitler's "astounding technical and tactical vision led him also to become the creator of modern weaponry for the army". He hammered home arguments by reciting long passages from Frederick the Great and other military thinkers. "Although the generals might at times refer to Hitler as a 'facile amateur', he was so far as an understanding of military history and weapons technology went, better educated and equipped than most of them." On 4 February 1938, after Blomberg's disgrace and retirement, Hitler announced in a decree: "From henceforth I exercise personally the immediate command over the whole armed forces." He abolished the War Ministry and took Blomberg's other title, Commander-in-Chief, for himself. By that year's end, the army had more than 1 million men and 25,000 officers.

== World War II ==
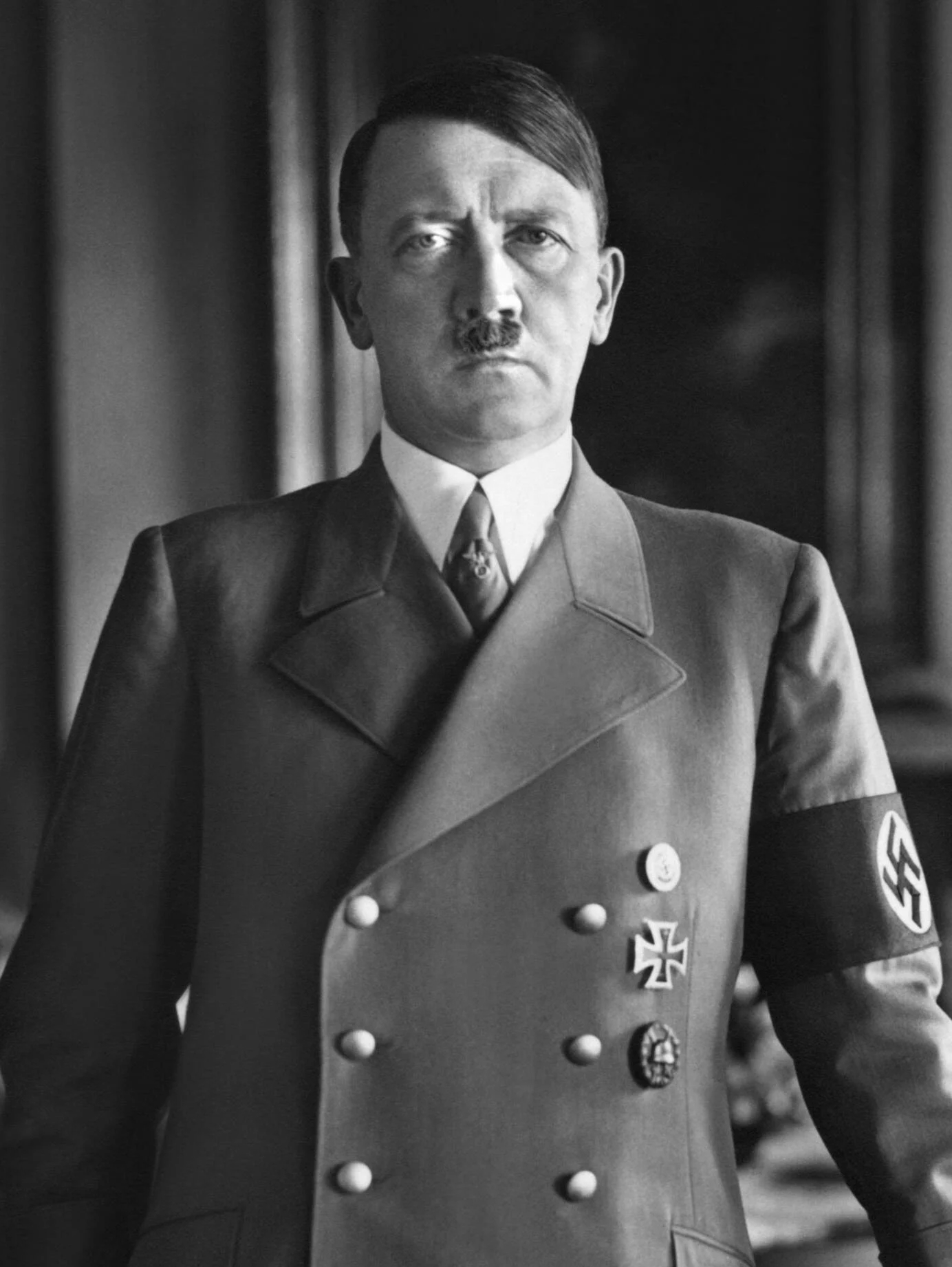
Hitler in 1938, wearing his gray uniform tunic with the Golden party Badge; Iron Cross and Wound badge. He is also wearing a Swastika armband on his left arm.

In his speech of 1 September 1939 at Kroll Opera House following the invasion of Poland, Hitler declared: "From now on I am just the first soldier of the German Reich. (Note: Erster Soldat des Deutschen Reiches – a self-claimed rank, equivalent of Generalissimo) I have once more put on the coat that was most sacred and dear to me. I will not take it off again until victory is secured, or I will not survive the outcome." From then on, he began wearing a grey military jacket with a swastika eagle sewn on the upper left sleeve. Throughout the war, the only military decorations Hitler displayed were his Wound Badge and Iron Cross from World War I and the Nazi Golden Party Badge. Hitler's position in World War II was essentially supreme commander of the German Armed Forces (Oberbefehlshaber der Deutschen Wehrmacht).

After ordering the preparations for the attack on Poland, he scrutinised all the staff prepared for the first three days of operations down to the regimental level. He rewrote the plans for the capture of a crucial bridge, making them much bolder. His status with the military escalated when they seized Norway and conquered Western Europe, with the major thrust coming through the Ardennes, which he had implemented despite the misgivings of many professional advisers. According to Zaloga, Hitler initially proved to be "a skilled amateur at military planning". To cement his control over the military as the war escalated, Hitler used systematic bribery of senior Wehrmacht officers to ensure their loyalty. This strategy proved effective at making senior officers increasingly dependent on the dictator's favor and loyal to his cause, though it also reduced their willingness to oppose his decisions. Though the bribery system remained technically legal, historians such as Wolfram Wette characterized it as deliberate corruption from above.

After the early German victories in World War II, Hitler became increasingly obsessed with his life mission and convinced of his own infallibility. He stopped listening to counter-opinions and became overconfident in his own political moves and military abilities. He started to attribute all victories to his leadership and any defeats to his subordinates' incompetence. Hitler ultimately came to the conclusion that a full victory on the Western front, especially over Great Britain, would only be possible by eliminating the Allies' hope in a Soviet intervention. He thus ordered his high command to prepare an invasion of the Soviet Union in summer 1940. Hitler's strategic views were largely backed by his top commanders who earnestly agreed with his stated goals and overoptimistic beliefs in regards to an eastern campaign. Historian David Stahel argued that "reckless assumptions [...] astonishingly were allowed to persist throughout the numerous planning phases and operational studies" for the eastern campaign, as the German senior commanders shared the dictator's assumption of a swift victory over the Soviet Union. Both Hitler and his generals were mainly inspired by "ideological precepts" in their strategic planning.

Following Operation Barbarossa, Hitler deepened his involvement in the war effort by appointing himself commander-in-chief of the German Army (Heer) in December 1941; thus taking a direct operational posting usually held by a full German general. From this point forward he personally directed the war against the Soviet Union, while his military commanders facing the Western Allies retained a degree of autonomy. Faced with growing problems on the Eastern Front, Hitler held an "almost religious faith that new weapons" would ensure an eventual German victory. He thus took a keen interest in the development of weaponry, and was directly involved in design decisions such as for the Tiger I and Panther tanks, V-2 rocket, and jet aircraft. Even though German military figures later claimed that Hitler's interventions in weaponry design and production decisions had been wholly negative and amateurish, historians found many of these claims to be fabrications to shift blame onto the dictator. (Note: For instance, military figures such as Adolf Galland claimed that Hitler had completely mishandled jet aircraft development by demanding the creation of a jet fighter-bomber instead of jet fighters. According to Eberle, this claim was not rooted in reality, as the German military experts themselves preferred jet bomber development during much of the war. Technicians as well as Luftwaffe commanders also assured Hitler that the Messerschmitt Me 262 had been designed as a bomber, only to later change the designs without his knowledge, much to the dictator's anger.) Historians such as Henrik Eberle and Robert Forczyk judged Hitler's design decisions as being of mixed value, some being sensible, some arbitrary, some based on ideological thinking, some based on resource necessities, and others based on faulty information relied to him.

Hitler's leadership became increasingly disconnected from reality as the war turned against Germany, with the military's defensive strategies often hindered by his slow decision making and frequent directives to hold untenable positions. Nevertheless, he continued to believe that only his leadership could deliver victory. By 1944, Hitler was largely surrounded by "sycophants" who backed his "increasingly deluded view" of the war, while he removed officers who opposed his decisions. For instance, he dismissed Erich von Manstein –considered to be among the best German commanders on the Eastern Front– in spring 1944, deeming the latter's "realistic appraisals" of the strategic situation to be defeatist. Fearing the loss of favors connected to the dictator's bribery system, many senior officers opted to go along with Hitler's decision making even when they understood the war's realities; this further increased his self-perception as the sole "genius strategist" of the German war effort. Yet elements of the officer corps of the German army struck back at Hitler. Unhappy with his repeated interventions, his increasingly impossible orders, and the war situation turning worse and worse as the Eastern front began to slowly collapse, multiple conspiracies were formed against him, resulting in several attempts upon Hitlers life, including the famous July 20 plot.

By mid-1944, Hitler continued to hold the belief that the Soviet Union was teetering on the edge of collapse despite the latter's increasingly effective military operations, thinking that Germany merely needed to hold out until the Soviets had exhausted themselves. Based on his experiences in World War I, Hitler assumed that victory would be possible as long as Germany maintained its will to resist. As a result of this belief, he increasingly viewed any kind of retreat as a form of defeatism and thus insisted on fighting for all territory, regardless of strategic worth. This manifested in the order to prepare more and more feste Plätze, fortresses which were supposed to hold out in enemy territory. Hitler's holding orders and reluctancy to permit tactical retreats accelerated the destruction of Army Group Centre during Operation Bagration (June–August 1944).

As evidence of Germany's impending defeat mounted, Hitler focused on "wonder weapons" and enemy mistakes to maintain his belief in an Endsieg (final victory). In the final months of the war Hitler refused to consider peace from a position of weakness, regarding the destruction of Germany as preferable to surrender. The military did not challenge Hitler's dominance of the war effort and senior officers generally continued to support and enact his decisions. By 22 April 1945, when he finally acknowledged that the war was lost, Hitler told Generals Wilhelm Keitel and Jodl that he had no further orders to give.

== Awards and decorations ==
Decorations from World War I

- Iron Cross, Second Class – 2 December 1914
- Bavarian Cross of Military Merit, Third Class with Swords – 17 September 1917
- Regimental Diploma (Regiment "List") – 5 May 1918
- Wound Badge in Black – 18 May 1918
- Iron Cross, First Class – 4 August 1918
- Bavarian Medal of Military Service, Third Class – 25 August 1918
- Honour Cross of the World War 1914/1918 with Swords – 13 July 1934 (retroactively awarded to all war veterans)

Toward the end of the war, the only decorations Hitler wore regularly were the Wound Badge and First Class Iron Cross. Of the Nazi Party badges, the Golden Party Badge number '7' was the only one he wore on a regular basis.

== Sources ==
- Alberge, Dalya (16 August 2010). "Adolf Hitler a war hero? Anything but, said first world war comrades". The Guardian. Archived from the original on 15 September 2013.
- Angolia, John (1989). For Führer and Fatherland: Political & Civil Awards of the Third Reich. R. James Bender Publishing. ISBN 978-0-912-13816-9.
- Bullock, Alan (1962) [1952]. Hitler: A Study in Tyranny. London: Penguin Books. LCCN 63005065.
- Eberle, Henrik (2014). Hitlers Weltkriege: Wie der Gefreite zum Feldherrn wurde [Hitler's world wars: How the private became a military commander]. Hoffman und Campe Verlag. ISBN 978-3455502657.
- Evans, Richard J. (2003). The Coming of the Third Reich. Penguin Group. ISBN 978-0-14-303469-8.
- Goda, Norman (2005). "Black Marks: Hitler's Bribery of his Senior Officers During World War II". In Kreike, Emmanuel; Jordan, William Chester (eds.). Corrupt Histories. Toronto: Hushion House. pp. 96–137. ISBN 978-1-58046-173-3.
- Forczyk, Robert (2007). Panther vs. T-34. Ukraine 1943. Oxford: Osprey Publishing. ISBN 978-184603-149-6.
- Hitler, Adolf (1999) [1925]. Mein Kampf. New York: Houghton Mifflin. ISBN 978-0-395-92503-4.
- Keegan, John (1987). The Mask of Command: A Study of Generalship. London: Pimlico. ISBN 978-0-7126-6526-1.
- Kershaw, Ian (1998). Hitler 1889-1936: Hubris. London: Allen Lane - The Penguin Press. ISBN 0-713-99047-3.
- Kershaw, Ian (2000). Hitler 1936-45: Nemesis. Allen Lane - The Penguin Press. ISBN 0-713-99229-8.
- Kershaw, Ian (2008). Hitler: A Biography. New York: W. W. Norton & Company. ISBN 978-0-393-06757-6.
- Kershaw, Ian (2012). The End: Hitler's Germany, 1944–45 (Paperback ed.). London: Penguin. ISBN 978-0-14-101421-0.
- Langer, Walter C. (1972) [1943]. The Mind of Adolf Hitler: The Secret Wartime Report. New York: Basic Books. ISBN 978-0-465-04620-1.
- Lockenour, Jay (2021). Dragonslayer: The Legend of Erich Ludendorff in the Weimar Republic and Third Reich. Ithaca, New York: Cornell University Press. ISBN 978-1501754593.
- Mitchell, Otis C. (2013). Hitler's Stormtroopers and the Attack on the German Republic, 1919-1933. McFarland. ISBN 9780786477296.
- Nebelin, Manfred (2011). Ludendorff: Diktator im Ersten Weltkrieg [Ludendorff: Dictator in World War I]. Munich: Siedler. ISBN 978-3886809653.
- O'Donnell, James P. (1978). The Bunker. Boston: Houghton Mifflin. ISBN 0-395-25719-0.
- Overy, Richard (2005). "Hitler As War Leader". In Dear, I. C. B.; Foot, M. R. D. (eds.). Oxford Companion to World War II. Oxford: Oxford University Press. ISBN 978-0-19-280670-3.
- Rees, Laurence (2012). Hitler's Charisma: Leading Millions Into the Abyss. Pantheon Books. ISBN 9780307377296.
- Schramm, Percy E. (1972). Hitler. The Man and the Military Leader. London: Allen Lane The Penguin Press.
- Shirer, William L. (1960). The Rise and Fall of the Third Reich. New York: Simon & Schuster. LCCN 60-6729.
- Solleder, Fridolin (1932). Vier Jahre Westfront. Geschichte des Regiments List R. J. R. 16. München: Verlag Max Schrift.
- Stackelberg, Roderick (2007). The Routledge Companion to Nazi Germany. New York: Routledge. ISBN 978-0-415-30860-1.
- Stahel, David (2011). Operation Barbarossa and Germany's Defeat in the East (Paperback ed.). Cambridge: Cambridge University Press. ISBN 978-0-521-17015-4.
- Stein, George (2002) [1966]. The Waffen-SS: Hitler's Elite Guard at War 1939–1945. Cerberus Publishing. ISBN 978-1841451008. Archived from the original on 18 April 2023.
- Steiner, John Michael (1976). Power Politics and Social Change in National Socialist Germany: A Process of Escalation into Mass Destruction. The Hague: Mouton. ISBN 978-90-279-7651-2.
- Strawson, John (1971). Hitler as Military Commander. London: B. T. Bastford.
- Toland, John (1976). Adolf Hitler. New York: Doubleday & Company. ISBN 978-0-385-03724-2.
- Ullrich, Volker (2016). Hitler: Ascent, 1889-1939. Knopf Doubleday Publishing Group. ISBN 9780385354394.
- Weber, Thomas (2010). Hitler's First War. New York: Oxford University Press. ISBN 978-0-19-923320-5.
- Wette, Wolfram (2009). The Wehrmacht. Translated by Deborah Lucas Schneider. Harvard University Press. ISBN 9780674045118.
- Zaloga, Steven (1997) [1st pub. 1996]. Bagration 1944: The Destruction of Army Group Centre (reprint ed.). Oxford: Osprey Publishing. ISBN 1-85532-478-4.
- Heinemann, Winfried (2022). Operation "Valkyrie". A Military History of the 20 July 1944 Plot. Berlin: de gruyter. ISBN 978-3110699180.
