= Awards of the German Freikorps =

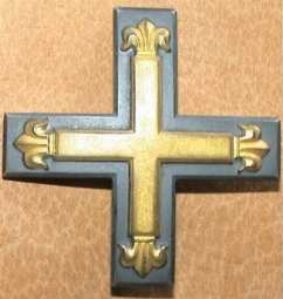
Baltic Cross

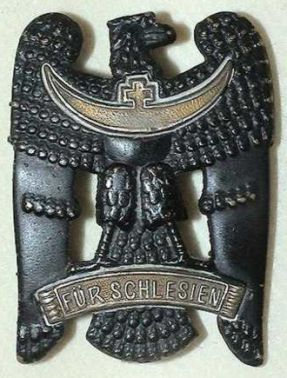
Silesian Eagle

Awards of the German Freikorps were unofficial military awards displayed by various veteran organizations in Germany during the immediate aftermath of World War I. Upon the assumption of the Nazi Party to power in 1933, nearly all Freikorps awards were prohibited for wear on party, state, and military uniforms. Two notable exceptions were the Baltic Cross and Silesian Eagle. All other Freikorps awards were declared obsolete with World War I service thereafter recognized by a single award, known as the Honour Cross.

== List of veteran awards ==
Freikorps awards may be divided into two categories: veteran decorations recognized by the German government as well as paramilitary awards issued under the authority of local Freikorps commanders.

Veteran awards

- Anhalt Field Decoration
- Argonne Cross
- Artillery Cross (1st and 2nd Class)
- Baden Field Decoration
- Bavarian War Commemorative Cross
- Brunswick Field Decoration
- Champagne Cross
- Colonial War Veterans Badge
- Danzig Shield
- Eastern Front Cross
- Federal Decoration (1st and 2nd Class)
- Flanders Naval Corps Commemorative Cross
- Frankfurt Medal
- George Award (Cross & Medal)
- German Field Honour Cross
- German Front Soldier's Badge
- German World War Commemorative Medal
- Golden War Cross of Honour (with and without swords)
- Hanover War Commemorative Medal
- Keller Cross
- Kyffhauser War Commemorative Medal (with 97 possible campaign and service bars)
- Knight's Cross of the German Legion of Honour
- Langemarck Cross
- Mackensen Honour Cross (1st and 2nd Class)
- Maltese Cross
- Munich Front Cross
- Prisoner-of-War Commemorative Cross
- Prussian Knight's Cross of Honour (1st and 2nd Class)
- Saxon Knight's Cross of Honour (1st and 2nd Class)
- Somme Cross
- Verdun Cross
- War Cross of Honour (with and without swords)
- War Volunteers Commemorative Cross
- World War Commemorative Cross (issued by the League of German Railwaymen)
- Wurttemberg War Commemorative Badge

Commemorative awards

- German Legion of Honor

In addition to the awards listed above, there existed hundreds of additional veteran badges, pins, and other pseudo-decorations issued on behalf of individual regiments and battalions. The vast majority of these were considered unofficial commemorative medals and worn only at specific veteran events or reunions. Another common practice of many regiments was to issue "regimental diplomas" which certified that a veteran had performed combat service in a regiment during the First World War. The most famous of these types of certificates was the Regimental Diploma List which was presented to Adolf Hitler for his own World War I military service.

== Paramilitary decorations ==
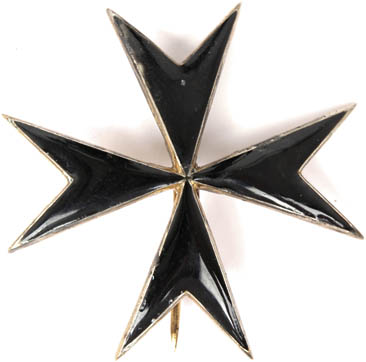
German Knight's Cross

The following awards were issued by local Freikorps commands, and usually were only worn and displayed while serving as a member of the issuing command.

Freikorps awards

- Alten Loyalty Badge
- Annaberg Cross
- Awaloff Death's Head Cross
- Baltic Cross
- Bergerhoff Commemorative Badge
- Beuthen Cross of Honour
- Black Guard Cross of Loyalty
- Bremen Commemorative Medal
- Bug Star
- Danzig Decoration
- Diebitsch Cross
- Erhardt Brigade Decoration
- German Knight's Cross
- German Legion Commemorative Badge
- German Self Defense Division Medal
- Grodno Decoration
- Guard Cavalry Decoration
- Hindenburg Merit Medal
- Iron Division Medal
- Iron Flotilla Medal
- Iron Roland
- Kreuzburg Cross
- Kuhme Badge
- Kurland Medal
- Lautenbacher Merit Badge
- Lowenfeld Cross
- Lublinitz Cross
- Lutzow Cross
- May Decoration
- Munich Medal
- Northern Military Hospital Battalion Decoration
- Oberland Commemorative Decoration
- Pitschener Cross
- Silesian Cross, Eagle, Medal, and Shield
- Sudetenland Volunteer Regiment Decoration
- Teutonic Shield
- von Aulock Commemorative Badge
- von Epp Staff Company Commemorative Medal
- von Heydebreck Merit Badge
- von Oven Decoration
- von Pfeffer Merit Decoration
- Weickhmann Order
- Wolf Battalion Merit Badge

Freikorps Service Awards

- Medal for Good Horse Care
