= Herbert von Böckmann =

- Born: 24 July 1886; Bremen, German Empire
- Died: 10 March 1974 (aged 87); Baden-Baden, Baden-Württemberg, West Germany
- Relatives: ∞ 1917 Ina Ucke (1893–1974), 5 children
- Military career
- Allegiance: German Empire (to 1918); Weimar Republic (to 1933); Nazi Germany
- Branch: Prussian Army; Imperial German Army; Freikorps; Reichswehr; Army
- Service years: 1905–43
- Rank: General of the Infantry
- Commands: 11. Infanterie-Division; L. Armeekorps
- Conflicts: First World War; World War II: Annexation of Memel; Invasion of Poland; Battle of France; Operation Barbarossa; Siege of Leningrad
- Awards: Knight's Cross of the Iron Cross

Herbert Adolf Wilhelm Erich Adalbert von Böckmann (24 July 1886 – 10 March 1974) was a German general during World War II who commanded the L Army Corps. He was a recipient of the Knight's Cross of the Iron Cross of Nazi Germany.

== Life ==
Herbert's parents were the Prussian Lieutenant General Alfred von Böckmann, a Knight of the Pour le Merite, and his wife Klara, née von Wersebe.

After attending the Cadet Corps, von Böckmann joined the 1st Baden Life-Grenadier Regiment No. 109 of the Prussian Army in Karlsruhe as a Fähnrich (officer cadet) on March 14, 1905, and was promoted to 2nd Lieutenant by mid-August 1906. From October 1, 1913, to July 31, 1914, von Böckmann was assigned to the War Academy in Berlin for further training.

After the outbreak of the First World War, he was assigned to the Döberitz Aviation School and, from August 11, 1914, Böckmann served in the 8th Field Aviation Detachment. In this capacity, he was promoted to 1st Lieutenant on November 28, 1914. Von Böckmann returned to his home regiment on August 21, 1915, and was posted to the Eastern Front as a company leader. There, he was assigned to the High Command of the Niemen Army on October 13, 1915, and two days later, he was assigned as an aide-de-camp to the staff of the Mitau Group. As a Captain (since March 22, 1916), he was transferred to the General Staff of the 1st Reserve Corps on August 31, 1916, and on December 7, 1916, in the same capacity to the 216th Infantry Division. Von Böckmann then alternated between various general staffs, most recently, from May 31, 1918, in the Political Department of the Field Army.

After the end of the war, he joined the staff of the Baltic Landwehr on December 1, 1918. At the end of February 1919, he left there and joined the Potsdam Freikorps as a company commander, then the Hülsen Freikorps. On October 1, 1920, von Böckmann was transferred to the Reichswehr and assigned as a company commander in the 9th Infantry Regiment.

Before the outbreak of World War II, Major General von Böckmann briefly served as Chief of the General Staff of the 3rd Army from August 23 to October 2, 1939, then as Chief of the General Staff of the Northern Border Sector Command, and finally as Commander of the 11th Infantry Division on October 26, 1939.

Von Böckmann subsequently led the division during the Western Campaign and, as a Lieutenant General (since August 1, 1940), in the war against the Soviet Union. He was transferred to the Führer Reserve from January 26 to March 9, 1942. He was subsequently assigned command of the L. Army Corps and promoted to General of the Infantry on April 19, 1942. Von Böckmann was recalled from his post on July 20, 1942, and transferred back to the Führer Reserve. He was honorably discharged from the armed forces on 31 March 1943 because of his age, maintaining the right to wear the uniform.

== Awards and decorations ==
- Knight's Cross of the Order of the Griffon (Mecklenburg) on 3 January 1912
- Iron Cross (1914), 2nd and 1st Class
  - 2nd Class on 10 September 1914
  - 1st Class on 27 January 1915
- Knight's Cross Second Class of the Order of the Zähringer Lion with Swords on 23 June 1915
- Military Merit Cross (Austria-Hungary), 3rd class with War Decoration
- Baltic Cross
- Honour Cross of the World War 1914/1918 with Swords
- Wehrmacht Long Service Award, 4th to 1st Class
- Memel Medal
- Repetition Clasp 1939 to the Iron Cross 1914, 2nd and 1st Class
  - 2nd Class on 15 September 1939
  - 1st Class on 4 October 1939
- Eastern Front Medal
- Knight's Cross of the Iron Cross on 4 December 1941 as Generalleutnant and commander of 11. Infanterie Division
- Grand Cross of the Order of Isabella the Catholic (1942)

Military offices
Preceded by Generalleutnant Max Bock	Commander of 11. Infanterie-Division; 23 October 1939 – 26 January 1942	Succeeded by Generalleutnant Siegfried Thomaschki
Preceded by General der Kavallerie Philipp Kleffel	Commander of L. Armeekorps; 3 March 1942 – 20 July 1942	Succeeded by General der Kavallerie Philipp Kleffel
