= 251st Division =

251st Division may refer to:

- 251st Infantry Division, Wehrmacht, Germany
- 251st Rifle Division, Soviet Union

== See also ==
- List of military divisions by number
