= German Knight's Cross =

Award of the German Freikorps

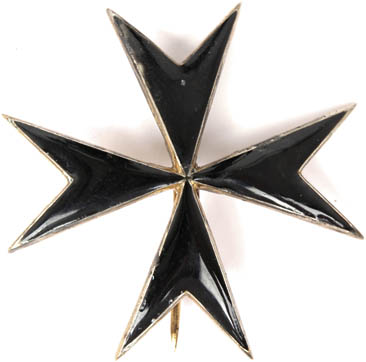
German Knight's Cross or Randow Cross

The German Knight's Cross (German: Deutschritter-Kreuz) was an award of the German Freikorps which existed after the close of the First World War. The award was created in 1919 and was designed by Captain Alfred von Randow. Known alternatively as the "Randow Cross", the decoration was issued mainly to members of the Free Corps formation "Volunteer Detachment von Randow" (Freiwilligen Detachement von Randow) which had been raised in January 1919 for security in the Baltic region.

== Classes ==
There were originally two classes of the German Knight's Cross, the first being the standard German Knight's Cross (Deutschritter-Kreuz) as well as a Silver Breast Star (Bruststern in Silber). In May 1919, two additional degrees were created: the Golden Breast Star (Bruststern in Gold) as well as the Grand Cross of the German Knight's Cross (Grosskreuz des Deutschritter-Kreuzes). The original German Knight's Cross was then divided into two separate classes, creating the following series of degrees.

- German Knight's Cross (2nd Class) – black ribbon with clasp
- German Knight's Cross (1st Class) – tunic medal
- Silver Breast Star of the German Knight's Cross – star medal on tunic pocket
- Golden Breast Star of the German Knight's Cross – star medal on tunic pocket
- Grand Cross of the German Knight's Cross – worn as a neck decoration

All classes could be worn with or without swords to denote combat-related Freikorps actions.

== Disestablishment ==
The German Knight's Cross was issued primarily between 1919 and 1923 with sporadic presentations until 1928. The decoration was declared obsolete and unauthorized for wear by the Nazi Party in 1933. Recipients were thereafter eligible for the Honor Cross of the World War.
