= Otto Lancelle =

German army general (1885–1941)

- Lancelle in 1939
- Born: 27 March 1885; Xanten, Rhine Province, Kingdom of Prussia, German Empire
- Died: 3 July 1941 (aged 56); Krāslava, Latvian SSR, Soviet Union
- Children: Kraft Lancelle
- Military career
- Allegiance: German Empire; Weimar Republic; Nazi Germany
- Branch: Royal Prussian Army; Freikorps; Provisional Reichswehr; German Army
- Service years: 1905–1920; 1935–1941
- Rank: Major; Generalleutnant (posthumously)
- Commands: Artillery regiments 43, 115, 168 and 138; 121st Infantry Division
- Conflicts: World War I World War II: Battle of France; Operation Barbarossa †
- Awards: Pour le Mérite; Knight's Cross of the Iron Cross; Iron Cross 1st and 2nd class Clasp to the Iron Cross 1st and 2nd class House Order of Hohenzollern; Wound Badge in gold and in silver

Otto Quirin Lancelle (27 March 1885 – 3 July 1941) was a German soldier who fought in both world wars and was awarded both the Pour le Mérite and the Knight's Cross of the Iron Cross, the highest military awards of the German Empire and Nazi Germany, respectively. During the interwar period, he joined Der Stalhelm and the Nazi Party, and participated in the failed Beer Hall Putsch that aimed to overthrow the Weimar Republic. He also was a member of the Supreme SA Leadership of the Nazi paramilitary organization, the Sturmabteilung (SA), in which he attained the rank of SA-Oberführer. Returning to military service, he became a general in command of an infantry division in the Wehrmacht during the Second World War and was killed in action in the first weeks of the invasion of the Soviet Union.

== Early life and military service ==
Lancelle was descended from a French Huguenot family that fled persecution in Catholic France and resettled in Germany in the seventeenth century. He was born in the Rhine Province, the son of a Royal Prussian Army officer who had fought in the Austro-Prussian War and the Franco-Prussian War. After earning his Abitur, Lancelle joined the Imperial German Navy as a midshipman on 1 April 1905. In December of the same year, he transferred to the Royal Prussian Army as a Fahnenjunker (officer cadet) with the 43rd (Kleve) Field Artillery Regiment, headquartered in Wesel. He was commissioned as a Leutnant on 27 January 1907, was attached to the Artillerieschule (artillery school) at Jüterbog in March 1912 and was promoted to Oberleutnant on 8 July 1914.

At the outbreak of the First World War, Lancelle was attached to the 6th Guards Field Artillery Regiment as a platoon leader in the 5th and then the 2nd battery. He then advanced to the command of the 2nd battery in October 1914. He was promoted to Hauptmann on 2 April 1915, was twice wounded and moved to the eastern front in December 1915 as a battalion commander with the 5th Foot Guards Field Artillery Regiment. He returned to the western front as an artillery staff officer with the 1st Army from April 1917 to June 1918. He then returned to the role of battalion commander with the 2nd Guards Field Artillery Regiment until the end of the war. He distinguished himself several times, receiving both classes of the Iron Cross, the Knight's Cross of the Royal House Order of Hohenzollern with Swords and, on 9 October 1918, the highest Prussian award for bravery, the Pour le Mérite.

After the Armistice of 11 November 1918, he returned to Germany and was involved in suppressing the Munich Soviet Republic in May 1919. He transferred to the provisional Reichswehr in July 1919. He was initially appointed as commander of the 3rd battery in the 26th Reichswehr Artillery Regiment and transferred a month later to the training regiment at the field artillery school. He also became involved with the Freikorps units fighting in Upper Silesia. Refusing to swear allegiance to the Weimar Republic, he was placed on leave and then was discharged from military service on 31 March 1920 with the rank of brevet Major. He then obtained civilian employment as head of personnel at a celluloid factory at Eilenburg in Saxony.

== Nazi Party and SA career ==
Lancelle joined the right-wing veterans organization, Der Stahlhelm in 1920, co-founding and leading the local branch in Eilenburg. He also joined the Nazi Party in 1923 and took part in Adolf Hitler's failed Beer Hall Putsch in November of the same year, after which he was dismissed from his personnel job at the insistence of the factory workers. After the Nazi Party was banned, he left Der Stahlhelm in February 1924 and joined the Frontbann, a front organization of the banned Nazi paramilitary Sturmabteilung (SA), headed by Ernst Röhm. Lancelle obtained employment at the Leuna works chemical complex as a personnel advisor, remaining there until November 1931 and living in nearby Merseburg.

On 4 November 1931, Lancelle became a full-time employee on the staff of the Supreme SA Leadership (OSAF) in Munich with the rank of SA-Standartenführer. On 1 February 1932, he was promoted to SA-Oberführer. However, in April of that same year, he was removed from the OSAF after sharply criticizing SA-Stabschef Ernst Röhm for his homosexuality. In 1932, Lancelle also played a role in revealing the partial Jewish ancestry of the Stahlhelm deputy federal leader Theodor Duesterberg, which the Nazis used to damage Duesterberg's candidacy in the 1932 German presidential election and to attract Stahlhelm supporters to Hitler's candidacy.

For the next few years, Lancelle was involved with the development of the Reich Labor Service (Reichsarbeitsdienst, RAD) under Konstantin Hierl. In July 1932, he established the first state labor service in Anhalt and, in May of the following year, he headed the RAD Reich School in Berlin-Spandau, later serving as the director of the RAD Reich School in Potsdam. In January 1935, some six months after Röhm's murder in the Night of the Long Knives, Lancelle was reinstated on the staff of the OSAF, retaining his rank of SA-Oberführer.

== Return to the army and war service ==
On 1 October 1935, Lancelle was reactivated in the German Army at his former rank of Major and was assigned to the staff of the 7th Artillery Regiment. He voluntarily left the SA on 1 April 1936, committing himself to a full-time military career. Promoted to Oberstleutnant on 20 April 1936, he then successively commanded artillery regiments 43 (April 1938) and 115 (November 1938) and was promoted to Oberst on New Year's Day 1939. On the outbreak of the Second World War in September 1939, Lancelle was assigned as the commandant of Frankfurt (Oder). However, he left this post on 24 October to take over as commander of the 168th Artillery Regiment. He next commanded the 138th Artillery Regiment in November 1940. Promoted to Generalmajor on 1 February 1941, he took command of the 121st Infantry Division in May and led it in the German invasion of the Soviet Union the next month.

== Death ==
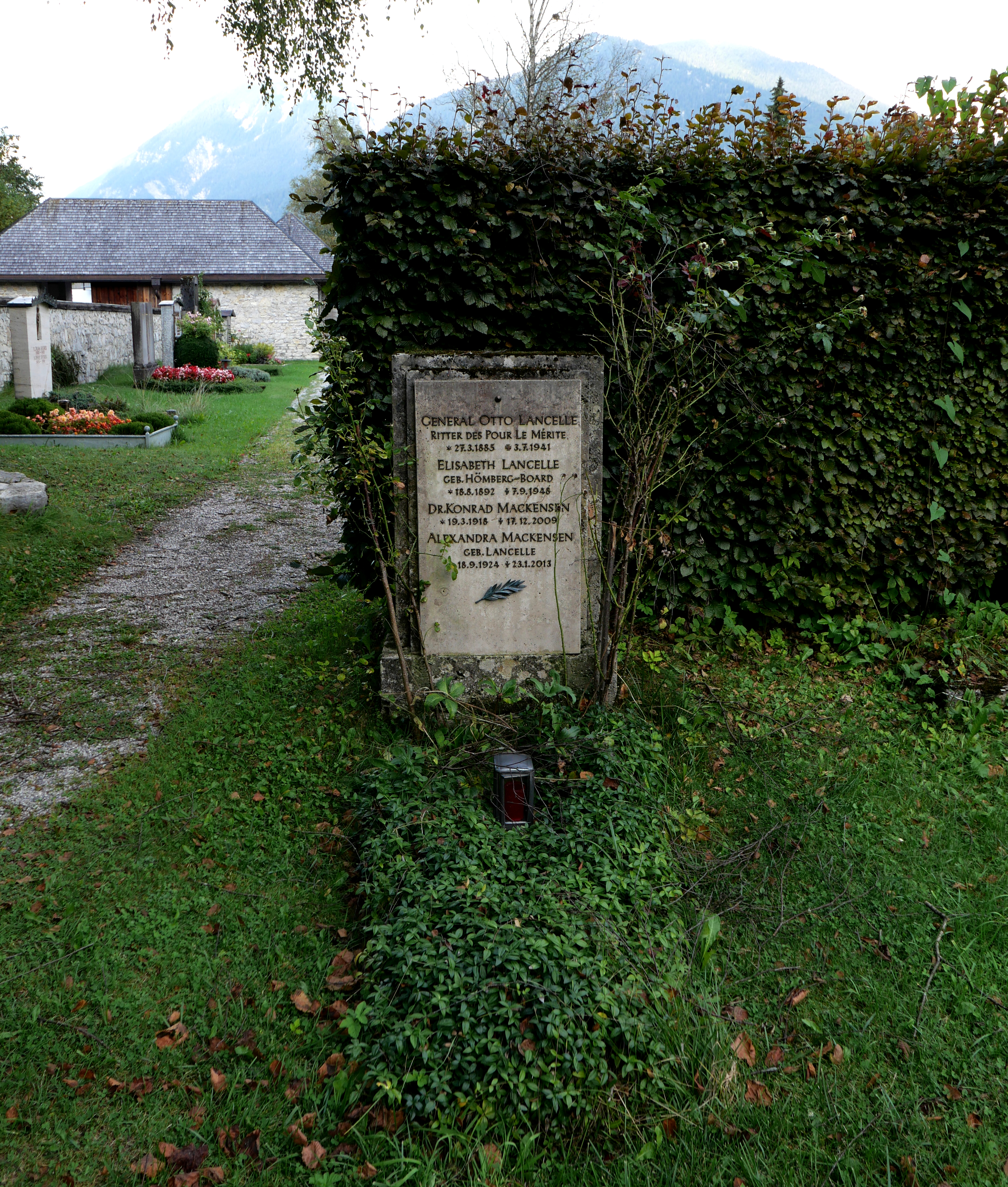
The Lancelle family gravesite in 2024

Lancelle was killed on 3 July 1941 when he was shot by a sniper at a bridgehead on the Daugava near Krāslava, Latvia. His death was announced in Berlin on 10 July. He was the first German general to be killed in Soviet territory. He was posthumously promoted to Generalleutnant on 21 July with an effective date of 1 July, and was awarded the Knight's Cross of the Iron Cross on 27 July. Lancelle was first buried next to the Krāslava Lutheran Church, and later reinterred in Friedhof Garmisch at Garmisch-Partenkirchen. The Polish town of Rzgów was renamed Lancellenstätt in his honor by the German occupiers from 1943 to 1945. A memorial marker on the site of his death was installed by his son Kraft in July 1994, but it was removed by authorities in November 2022.

== Military ranks ==
Dates of rank
Military rank	Date
Fahnrich	18 April 1906
Leutnant	27 January 1907
Oberleutnant	8 July 1914
Hauptmann	3 April 1915
Major	31 March 1920; 1 October 1935
Oberstleutnant	20 April 1936
Oberst	1 January 1939
Generalmajor	1 February 1941
Generalleutnant (posthumous)	1 July 1941

== Awards and decorations ==
- Iron Cross (1914) 2nd and 1st class
- Knight's Cross of the Royal House Order of Hohenzollern with Swords (14 August 1917)
- Pour le Mérite (9 October 1918)
- Wound Badge (1914) in silver
- Honour Cross of the World War 1914/1918
- Clasp to the Iron Cross (1939) 2nd and 1st class
- Knight's Cross of the Iron Cross on 27 July 1941 (posthumous)
- Wound Badge (1939) in gold (posthumous)

Military offices
Preceded by General der Artillerie Curt Jahn	Commander of 121. Infanterie-Division; 6 May 1941 – 3 July 1941	Succeeded by General der Artillerie Martin Wandel
