= Martin Wandel =

German general (1892–1943)

- Born: 15 April 1892; Berlin, German Empire
- Died: 14 January 1943 (aged 50); Chilino, Russian SFSR, Soviet Union
- Military career
- Allegiance: German Empire; Weimar Republic; Nazi Germany
- Branch: Imperial German Army; Reichswehr; German Army
- Service years: 1910–1943
- Rank: General of the Artillery (posthumously)
- Commands: 121st Infantry Division; XXIV Panzer Corps
- Conflicts: World War I World War II
- Awards: Knight's Cross of the Iron Cross

Martin Wandel (15 April 1892 – missing in action 14 January 1943) was a German career military officer who fought in both world wars. He served in the Imperial German Army, the Reichswehr and the Wehrmacht. Rising to the rank of General of the Artillery during World War II, he commanded the 121st Infantry Division and XXIV Panzerkorps. He was a recipient of the Knight's Cross of the Iron Cross of Nazi Germany. Wandel went missing in action on 14 January 1943 when his command post was overrun in part of the encirclement in the Battle of Stalingrad. He was declared dead by a court in Berlin in 1948.

== World war I and the interwar years ==
Wandel was born in 1892 at Berlin and entered the Royal Prussian Army as a Fahnenjunker (officer cadet) in 1910. He participated in World War I and, at the end of the war, he was an Hauptmann serving in the 21st (1st Upper Silesian) Field Artillery Regiment. He was awarded both classes of the Iron Cross, along with other war decorations. He remained in the post-war Reichswehr and rose through the ranks. In the Wehrmacht, he became chief of staff of the Artillery Inspectorate at the Ministry of the Reichswehr in Berlin in October 1935.

== World War II ==
Leaving the Artillery Inspectorate in September 1940, Wandel became Artillery Commander 105. Promoted to Generalmajor on 1 April 1941, he was the commander of the 121st Infantry Division from July 1941 until November 1942, and was engaged in combat on the eastern front. After his promotion to Generalleutnant on 1 October 1942, he advanced to the command of XXIV Panzer Corps on 1 December 1942. During the Ostrogozhsk–Rossosh offensive by the Red Army, following its encirclement of the German 6th Army at Stalingrad, Wandel went missing in action on 14 January 1943 when his command post at Chilino, near Rossosh, was overrun. He was posthumously promoted to General of the Artillery, effective 1 January 1943. Wandel was declared dead in 1948.

== Awards and decorations ==
- Iron Cross (1914) 2nd and 1st class
- Hanseatic Cross of Hamburg
- Cross for Merit in War of Saxe-Meiningen
- Military Merit Cross of Austria-Hungary, 3rd class with war decoration
- Honour Cross of the World War 1914/1918
- Clasp to the Iron Cross 2nd class and 1st class
- Wound Badge (1939) in gold
- Order of the Cross of Liberty of Finland 1st class with swords
- Knight's Cross of the Iron Cross on 23 November 1941 as Generalmajor and commander of the 121st Infantry Division

== Sources ==
- Fellgiebel, Walther-Peer (2000) [1986]. Die Träger des Ritterkreuzes des Eisernen Kreuzes 1939–1945 — Die Inhaber der höchsten Auszeichnung des Zweiten Weltkrieges aller Wehrmachtteile [The Bearers of the Knight's Cross of the Iron Cross 1939–1945 — The Owners of the Highest Award of the Second World War of all Wehrmacht Branches] (in German). Friedberg, Germany: Podzun-Pallas. ISBN 978-3-7909-0284-6.
- Webb, James Jack (2025). Generals and Admirals of the Third Reich: For Country or Fuehrer. Vol. 3: P–Z. Havertown, PA: Casemate Publishers. ISBN 978-1-952-71518-1.

Military offices
Preceded by Generalleutnant Otto Lancelle	Commander of 121st Infantry Division; 8 July 1941 – 11 November 1942	Succeeded by General of the Infantry Helmuth Prieß
Preceded by General der Panzertruppe Otto von Knobelsdorff	Commander of XXIV Panzerkorps; 30 November 1942 – 14 January 1943	Succeeded by Generalleutnant Arno Jahr
