= German Legion of Honor =

German Legion of Honor shown with sword attachment

The German Legion of Honor was a veterans commemorative award of the Weimar Republic. The award was created in the 1920s under the authority of a "High Council of German Honor" composed of German veterans, many of whom had served as high-ranking officers or even as generals during World War I. The award was presented apparently for civic accomplishments in peacetime by veterans, with the criteria including the requirement that the recipient be an "excellent comrade and friend worthy of honor". The High Council of German Honor was also connected extensively with the Freikorps movement and frequently awarded the decoration as a paramilitary award.

== Classes and Devices ==
Originally the Legion of Honor was awarded in a single class. An attachment to the medal, showing a wreathed sword, was sometimes presented with the medal, however the specific criteria for the attachment remains unknown. In 1930, a veterans organization known as the "Knights of the German Legion of Honor" began to issue a Knight's Cross version of the medal; however, few photographs survive of this award.

== Discontinuance ==
The German Legion of Honor was declared obsolete, along with all other awards of the German Freikorps, in 1933 by the new government of Nazi Germany. Recipients were then eligible to receive the Honor Cross of the World War.
