= Kurt Jahn =

German general (1892–1966)

General Kurt Jahn, aka Curt Jahn, (February 16, 1892 – November 7, 1966) was a German Army general and commander in Lombardy, Italy during World War II. Born in Schmalkalden, Germany, he was captured west of Milan on 1 May 1945 and interned in Britain as a prisoner of war until May 1948.

Jahn had also been a member of the Baltische Landeswehr during the Latvian War of Independence.

Jahn died in Coburg on 7 November 1966.

== Awards and decorations ==
- German Cross in Gold (18 June 1942)
- Iron Cross of 1914, 1st and 2nd Class
- Clasp to the Iron Cross, 1st and 2nd Class
- Order of the Zähringer Lion, Knight 2nd Class with Swords (Baden)
- Saxe-Ernestine House Order, Knight 2nd Class with Swords
- Honour Cross of the World War 1914/1918
- Wehrmacht Long Service Award, 1st Class (25-year Service Cross) and 3rd Class (12-year Service Medal)

Military offices
Preceded by none	Commander of 121. Infanterie-Division; 5 October 1940 – 6 May 1941	Succeeded by Generalleutnant Otto Lancelle
Preceded by General der Artillerie Paul Bader	Commander of 3. Infanterie-Division (mot.); 25 May 1941 – 1 April 1942	Succeeded by Generalleutnant Helmuth Schlömer
Preceded by General der Infanterie Gustav-Adolf von Zangen	Commander of LXXXVII. Armeekorps; 8 July 1944 - 1 September 1944	Succeeded by None
