= 121st Infantry Division (Wehrmacht) =

- 121. Infanterie-Division
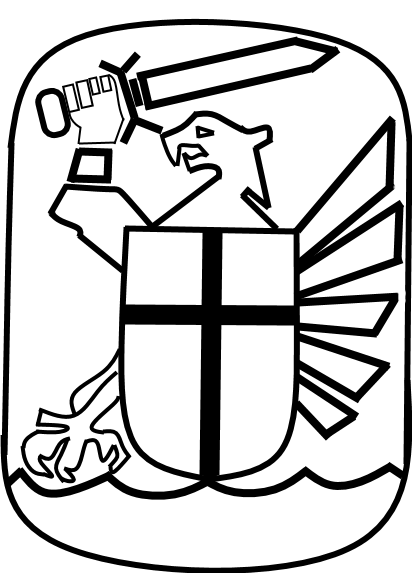
- 121. Infanterie Division Vehicle Insignia
- Active: 1940–45
- Country: Nazi Germany
- Branch: German Army
- Type: Infantry
- Size: Division
- Engagements: World War II

The 121st Infantry Division (German: 121. Infanterie-Division) was a German Wehrmacht division in World War II. It was a part of the German XXVIII Army Corps. In September 1941 the formation, on arriving in Pavlovsk, Saint Petersburg; engaged in the siege of Leningrad. By October 1941 it was down to 40% of its authorized strength and 3 infantry battalions had to be disbanded due to high casualties. In 1944 it was involved in the retreat from Leningrad through the Baltic states wherein it fought in the Battle of Pskov. It remained in the Courland pocket until the end of the war.

In the winter of 1943/44, the Blue Legion of Spanish volunteers (formerly part of the Blue Division, dissolved in late 1943) was initially attached to the 121st Division before its dissolution in March 1944.

== Commanding officers ==
- General der Artillerie Curt Jahn, 5 October 1940 – 6 May 1941
- Generalleutnant Otto Lancelle, 6 May 1941 – 3 July 1941 †
- General der Artillerie Martin Wandel, 8 July 1941 – 11 Nov 1942
- General der Infanterie Helmuth Prieß, 11 November 1942 – March 1944
- Generalmajor Ernst Pauer von Arlau, March 1944 – 1 June 1944
- Generalleutnant Rudolf Bamler, 1 June 1944 – 27 June 1944
- General der Infanterie Helmuth Prieß, 27 June 1944 – 10 July 1944
- General der Infanterie Theodor Busse, 10 July 1944 – 1 August 1944
- Generalleutnant Werner Ranck, 1 August 1944 – 30 April 1945
- Generalmajor Ottomar Hansen, 30 April 1945 – 8 May 1945

== Composition ==
- 405th Infantry Regiment
- 407th Infantry Regiment
- 408th Infantry Regiment
- 121st Artillerie Regiment
- 121st Reconnaissance Battalion
- 121st Tank Destroyer Battalion
- 121st Engineer Battalion
- 121st Signal Battalion
- 121st Divisional Supply Troops

== Bibliography ==
- Jeff Rutherford (2014). Combat and Genocide on the Eastern Front: The German Infantry's War, 1941–1944. ISBN 9781107055711.
- Samuel W. Mitcham (2007). German Order of Battle: 1st-290th Infantry divisions in World War II. ISBN 9780811734165.
