= Max Bock (general) =

WW II German general (1878–1945)

Max Bock (23 October 1878 – 2 November 1945) was a general in the Wehrmacht of Nazi Germany during World War II.

== Biography ==
Max Bock fought in World War I and joined the Reichswehr. On 1 April 1937, he was appointed commander of the 11th Infantry Division.

At the start of World War II, he took part in the Polish Campaign with his division. After the end of the campaign, he gave up his command and became commander of the new Wehrkreis (military district) XX in Reichsgau Danzig-West Prussia. On 1 December 1940, he was promoted to general of the infantry. On 28 February 1943, he was relieved of his post and replaced by general of the Infantry Bodewin Keitel, and transferred to the Führerreserve. On 30 April 1943, he was awarded the German Cross in Silver and on the same day, dismissed from the Wehrmacht.

After the war ended, he was arrested by the Soviet occupation authorities in late summer 1945. He died at the end of 1945 during his transport to Russia. He was buried in Brest-Litowsk.

== Sources ==
- Lexikon der Wehrmacht
- Deutsche digitale bibliothek

Military offices
| Preceded by Generalleutnant Günther von Niebelschütz | Commander of 11. Infanterie-Division; 1 April 1937 – 23 October 1939 | Succeeded by Generalleutnant Herbert von Böckmann |
| Preceded by General der Artillerie Walter Heitz | Military Commander of Reichsgau Danzig-West Prussia; 23 October 1939 - 30 April 1943 | Succeeded by General der Infanterie Bodewin Keitel |
