= XXVII Army Corps (Wehrmacht) =

Nazi-era German infantry corps

XXVII. Armeekorps
- Active: August 1939 – May 1945
- Country: Nazi Germany
- Branch: Army
- Size: Corps
- Engagements: World War II: Battle of the Netherlands; Battle of Belgium; Battle of France; Operation Barbarossa; Battles of Rzhev; Battle of Smolensk (1943); Operation Bagration; East Pomeranian Offensive; Vistula–Oder Offensive

The XXVII Corps (German: XXVII. Armeekorps, or XXVII.AK) was an infantry corps in the German army. It fought in several notable actions during World War II.

The corps was originally raised in August 1939 in Wehrkreis VII.

== Wartime service ==
=== 1939 ===
Organisation (September 1939): 16th, 69th, 211th and 216th Infantry Divisions

During September 1939 the XXVII Corps was used to screen the Dutch-German border.

=== 1940 ===
Organisation (June 1940): 211th, 213th, 218th and 239th Infantry Divisions

The Corps participated in Nazi Germany's Invasion of France as part of Army Group C. In May, it crossed the southern Netherlands and Belgium towards Roubaix, where it helped in surrounding the French 1st Army. Later in the campaign, it attacked from the east bank of the Rhine towards Colmar. It then remained on occupation duties in eastern France until the following year.

=== 1941 ===
Organisation (November 1941): 86th, 129th and 162nd Infantry Divisions; Gruppe Landgraf (parts of 6th and 7th Panzer Divisions)

The XXVII Corps did not take part in the initial stages of Operation Barbarossa, but was transferred to the Ninth Army, Army Group Centre, for Operation Typhoon, the attack on Moscow. On the Army's north flank, it advanced towards Kalinin, but by December had been forced to retreat into the Rzhev salient.

=== 1942 ===
Organisation (early November 1942): 6th, 72nd, 87th, 95th, 129th, 251st and 256th Infantry Divisions; heavy artillery and assault gun detachments

The Corps suffered heavy losses during 1942 in the series of defensive battles around Rzhev. Its organisation changed several times during this period, but included up to eight infantry divisions at various points. Along with the remainder of Army Group Centre, it was ordered to evacuate the Rzhev salient the following year in Operation Büffel.

=== 1943 ===
Organisation (July 1943): 52nd, 197th, 246th and 256th Infantry Divisions

In the autumn of 1943 the Corps, now assigned to Fourth Army, took part in the defence against the Soviet offensive Operation Suvorov around Smolensk. By the next year, it had been pushed back to positions east of Orsha.

=== 1944 ===
Organisation (June 1944): 25th Panzergrenadier Division, 78th Sturm Division, 260th Infantry Division

During 1944, the Corps was positioned in the sector of the strategically important Minsk - Moscow road near Orsha, having been specially reinforced for the purpose. In late June the Soviets commenced their summer offensive, Operation Bagration; the XXVII Corps was attacked by forces of the 3rd Belorussian Front and took heavy casualties. Bypassed by a breakthrough of Soviet forces to the north, the Corps found itself encircled in the forests east of Minsk, and despite a breakout attempt on 5 July spearheaded by the 25th Panzergrenadier Division, was almost entirely destroyed. The corps commander, General Paul Völckers, was captured, as were the commanders of the 78th and 260th Divisions, Hans Traut and Günther Klammt.

The Corps, and its staff, was hurriedly reconstructed in July / August from replacement units and deployed on the East Prussian border.

=== 1945 ===
The rebuilt XXVII Corps was transferred to Second Army, facing the Soviet East Prussian Offensive. During the course of the offensive it was encircled on the Baltic coast at Danzig, and again destroyed / disbanded. The staff was evacuated and transferred to the reconstructed Third Panzer Army; the remnants of the Corps eventually surrendered to troops of the US Army on 4 May, north of Ludwigslust.

== Commanders ==
- August 1939 General Karl Ritter von Prager
- November 1939 General Alfred Wäger
- 23 December 1941 Lieutenant-General Eccard Freiherr von Gablenz
- 13 January 1942 General Joachim Witthöft
- 1 July 1942 Colonel-General Walter Weiß
- 10 February 1943 Lieutenant-General Karl Burdach
- 8 June 1943 General Paul Völckers
- 27 July 1944 General Helmuth Prieß
- October 1944 General Maximilian Felzmann
- April 1945 General Walter Hörnlein
