= Siegfried Thomaschki =

German general (1894–1967)

- Born: 20 March 1894
- Died: 31 May 1967 (aged 73)
- Military career
- Allegiance: German Empire; Weimar Republic; Nazi Germany
- Branch: German Army
- Service years: 1913–1945
- Rank: General der Artillerie
- Commands: 11th Infantry Division; X Army Corps
- Conflicts: World War I; World War II; Invasion of Poland; Battle of France; Operation Barbarossa; Siege of Leningrad; Courland Pocket
- Awards: Knight's Cross of the Iron Cross with Oak Leaves

Siegfried Thomaschki (20 March 1894 – 31 May 1967) was a German general during World War II who commanded the 11th Infantry Division. He was a recipient of the Knight's Cross of the Iron Cross with Oak Leaves of Nazi Germany.

Thomaschki surrendered to the Soviet forces in the Courland Pocket on 8 May 1945. Convicted in the Soviet Union as a war criminal, he was held until 1955.

== Awards and decorations ==
- Iron Cross (1914) 2nd Class (31 November 1914) & 1st Class (27 January 1917)
- Clasp to the Iron Cross (1939) 2nd Class & 1st Class (18 December 1939)
- German Cross in Gold on 19 December 1941 as Oberst and Arko 123
- Knight's Cross of the Iron Cross with Oak Leaves
  - Knight's Cross on 1 November 1942 as Generalmajor and commander of 11. Infanterie-Division
  - Oak Leaves on 11 September 1943 as Generalleutnant and commander of 11.Infanterie-Division

Military offices
Preceded by Generalleutnant Herbert von Böckmann	Commander of 11. Infanterie-Division; 26 January 1942 – 7 September 1943	Succeeded by Generalleutnant Karl Burdach
Preceded by Generalleutnant Dr. Ing. Dr. Johannes Mayer	Commander of X. Armeekorps; 27 December 1944 – 8 May 1945	Succeeded by None
