= Helmuth Prieß (Wehrmacht general) =

German general and Knight's Cross recipient (1896–1944)

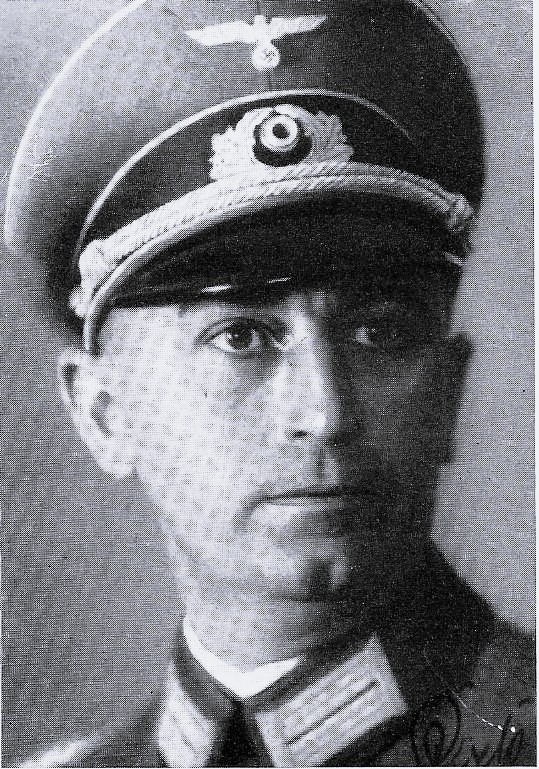
- Born: 6 March 1896; Hildesheim
- Died: 21 October 1944 (aged 48); Hasenrode, East Prussia, Germany
- Military career
- Allegiance: German Empire (to 1918); Weimar Republic (to 1933); Nazi Germany
- Branch: Army (Wehrmacht)
- Service years: 1914–1944
- Rank: General of the Infantry
- Commands: 121st Infantry Division; XXVII Army Corps
- Conflicts: World War I World War II
- Awards: Knight's Cross of the Iron Cross

Helmuth Prieß (6 March 1896 – 21 October 1944) was a general in the Wehrmacht of Nazi Germany during World War II who commanded the XXVII Army Corps. He was a recipient of the Knight's Cross of the Iron Cross. Prieß was killed on 21 October 1944 in Hasenrode, East Prussia.

== Awards and decorations ==
- Knight's Cross of the Iron Cross on 7 March 1944 as Generalleutnant and commander of 121. Infanterie-Division

Military offices
Preceded by General der Artillerie Martin Wandel	Commander of 121. Infanterie-Division; 11 November 1942 - March 1944	Succeeded by Generalmajor Ernst Pauer von Arlau
Preceded by Generalleutnant Rudolf Bamler	Commander of 121. Infanterie-Division; 27 June 1944 - 10 July 1944	Succeeded by General der Infanterie Theodor Busse
Preceded by General der Infanterie Paul Völckers	Commander of XXVII. Armeekorps; 27 July 1944 - 21 October 1944	Succeeded by General der Artillerie Maximilian Felzmann
