= 11th Infantry Division (Wehrmacht) =

- German: 11. Infanterie-Division
- Insignia of the 11th Infantry Division
- Active: 1 October 1934 – 8 May 1945
- Country: Nazi Germany
- Branch: Army
- Type: Infantry
- Size: Division
- Garrison/HQ: Allenstein
- Nickname: Red moose head
- Engagements: Mława; Operation Barbarossa; Narva Bridgehead; Narva; Auvere; Tannenberg Line; Courland Pocket

Commanders
- Notable commanders: Günther von Niebelschütz; Max Bock; Herbert von Böckmann; Siegfried Thomaschki; Karl Burdach; Hellmuth Reymann; Gerhard Feyerabend

Insignia
- Alternate shield

The 11th Infantry Division (German: 11. Infanterie-Division) was an infantry division of the Wehrmacht that was initially founded as a cover formation during the Reichswehr era. It was active from 1934 to 1945.

== History ==
The 11th Infantry Division was initially known by the cover name "Infantry Leader I" (German: Infanterieführer I), a military formation founded in Allenstein in October 1934. Several of the Wehrmacht infantry formation were disguised variously as "infantry leader" or "artillery leader" during the time of the Reichswehr, when military restrictions imposed limitations of size on Germany's military. The Reichswehr-era 2nd Infantry Regiment, also previously headquartered at Allenstein, was used to form the personnel of the subsequent 2nd and 23rd regiments of the 11th Division. The formation was officially redesignated "11th Infantry Division" on 15 October 1935.

On 18 August 1939, the division was mobilized and equipped with three infantry regiments and an artillery regiment. The infantry regiments were Infantry Regiment 2 (Allenstein), Infantry Regiment 23 (Rastenburg) and Infantry Regiment 44 (Bartenstein); the artillery regiment was Artillery Regiment 11 (Allenstein). Additionally, the division contained the "Division Units 11" for support. The 11th Infantry Division participated in the Invasion of Poland as part of the I Army Corps under 3rd Army. The I Army Corps, next to 11th Infantry Division, also featured the 61st Infantry Division and Panzer Division Kempf. In the early morning hours of 1 September 1939, the left flank of I Corps swung in a two-pronged assault towards the Polish stronghold at Mława, bringing about the Battle of Mława.

After a minor role in the Battle of France, the 11th Infantry Division was initially transferred to the Atlantic Wall until March 1941. It then returned to East Prussia in preparation of Operation Barbarossa, in which it participated as part of I Corps (along with 1st and 21st Divisions) under the 18th Army of Army Group North.

In January 1940, the Field Replacement Battalion 11 was detached and converted into the II./364 battalion of 161st Infantry Division in January 1940. In the following month, the II./44 battalion was also detached from the 11th Infantry Division and transferred to 291st Infantry Division as I./506; II./44 was subsequently replenished. In October 1940, a third of the division (including the staff of Regiment 2 and III./3, III./23 and III./44 battalions) was passed off to the newly-formed 126th Infantry Division and were subsequently replenished.

In summer 1942, III./23 battalion was dissolved.

On 2 October 1943, the division was ordered to be restructured into a "Division neuer Art"-type division. III./2 and II./44 battalions were dissolved in January and September 1944, respectively. This left the division with three infantry regiments (now called "Grenadier Regiments") with the same numbers as before, but with two rather than three battalions. Additionally, the division's reconnaissance battalion had been formed into the Division Fusilier Battalion 11.

In 1945, the division was taken prisoner by the Red Army in the Courland Pocket.

== Commanders ==
- Generalleutnant Günther von Niebelschütz: 1 October 1934 – 1 April 1937
- Generalleutnant Max Bock: 1 April 1937 – 23 October 1939
- Generalleutnant Herbert von Böckmann: 23 October 1939 – 26 January 1942
- Generalleutnant Siegfried Thomaschki: 26 January 1942 – 7 September 1943
- Generalleutnant Karl Burdach: 7 September 1943 – 1 April 1944
- Generalleutnant Hellmuth Reymann: 1 April 1944 – 18 November 1944
- Generalmajor Gerhard Feyerabend: 18 November 1944 – 8 May 1945

== Subordination and deployment ==
Superior formations of 11th Infantry Division
Year	Month	Army Corps	Army	Army group	Location
1939	Sep.	I	3rd Army	Army Group North	East Prussia, Poland
1939	Dec.	Army group reserves		Army Group B	Lower Rhine
1940	Jan./May	Army reserves	6th Army	Army Group B	Lower Rhine, Belgium, Lille
1940	Jun.	I	4th Army	Army Group B	Somme, Loire
1940	Jul./Aug.	I	7th Army	Army Group B	Atlantic coast
1940	Sep./Oct.	Army reserves	7th Army	Army Group B	Atlantic coast
1940	Nov./Dec.	XXXI	7th Army	Army Group D	Atlantic coast
1941	Jan./Feb.	XXXI	7th Army	Army Group D	Atlantic coast
1941	Mar.	Army reserves	18th Army	Army Group B	East Prussia
1941	Apr.	I	18th Army	Army Group B	East Prussia
1941	May	I	18th Army	Army Group C	East Prussia
1941	Jun./Aug.	I	18th Army	Army Group North	East Prussia–Volkhov
1941	Sep./Nov.	I	16th Army	Army Group North	Wolchow–Ladoga
1941	Dec.	I	18th Army	Army Group North	Wolchow–Ladoga
1942	Jan./Apr.	I	18th Army	Army Group North	Wolchow–Ladoga
1942	May./Dec.	XXVIII	18th Army	Army Group North	Wolchow–Ladoga
1943	Jan.	XXVIII	18th Army	Army Group North	Wolchow–Ladoga
1943	Feb./Sep.	XXVI	18th Army	Army Group North	Wolchow–Ladoga
1943	Oct./Dec.	LIV	18th Army	Army Group North	Leningrad
1944	Jan.	LIV	18th Army	Army Group North	
1944	Feb.	L	18th Army	Army Group North	Pskov
1944	Mar./May	XXVI	Narva	Army Group North	Narva
1944	Jun.	XXXXIII	Narva	Army Group North	Narva
1944	Jul./Sep.	III. SS	Narva	Army Group North	Narva, Pernau, Riga
1944	Oct./Nov.	I	18th Army	Army Group North	Courland Pocket
1944	Dec.	X	18th Army	Army Group North	Courland Pocket
1945	Jan.	I	18th Army	Army Group North	Courland Pocket
1945	Feb.	II	18th Army	Army Group Courland	Courland Pocket
1945	Mar./Apr.	L	18th Army	Army Group Courland	Courland Pocket

== Insignia ==
The 11th Infantry Division used two divisional emblems: one showed a red-and-white head of an elk atop a diagonally-divided red-and-white shield, the other showed a solid blue spot within a white square.

== Sources ==
=== Literature ===
- Müller-Hillebrand, Burkhard (1969). Der Zweifrontenkrieg. Das Heer vom Beginn des Feldzuges gegen die Sowjetunion bis zum Kriegsende. Das Heer 1933–1945. Entwicklung des organisatorischen Aufbaues. Vol. 3. Frankfurt/Main: Mittler.
- Tessin, Georg (1967). Die Landstreitkräfte 006–014. Verbände und Truppen der deutschen Wehrmacht und Waffen-SS im Zweiten Weltkrieg 1939–1945. Vol. 3. Frankfurt/Main: Verlag E. S. Mittler & Sohn GmbH. ISBN 3764809426.
