= Bug Star =

Discontinued German paramilitary award

The Bug Star, more formally known as the Bug Star of the Schutztruppe Bug was a paramilitary award of the German Freikorps which was issued in the 1920s. Awarded under the authority of local Freikorps commander Major Kobe von Keppenfels, the Bug Star recognized various achievements by members of the local Freikorps. The Freikorps itself was composed mostly of World War I veterans who had served in the Kurland and Lithuania.
