= Karl Burdach =

German general (1891–1976)

- Born: 28 July 1891
- Died: 30 December 1976 (aged 85)
- Military career
- Allegiance: Nazi Germany
- Branch: Army (Wehrmacht)
- Rank: Generalleutnant
- Commands: 251st Infantry Division; XXVII Army Corps; 11th Infantry Division
- Conflicts: World War II
- Awards: Knight's Cross of the Iron Cross

Karl Burdach (28 July 1891 – 30 December 1976) was a German general in the Wehrmacht during World War II. He was a recipient of the Knight's Cross of the Iron Cross, of Nazi Germany.

== Awards and decorations ==
- German Cross in Gold on 26 December 1941 as Generalmajor and commander of 251. Infanterie-Division
- Knight's Cross of the Iron Cross on 23 February 1944 as Generalleutnant and commander of 11. Infanterie-Division

Military offices
Preceded by Generalleutnant Hans Kratzert	Commander of 251. Infanterie-Division; 6 August 1941 – February 1943	Succeeded by General der Artillerie Maximilian Felzmann
Preceded by Generaloberst Walter Weiß	Commander of XXVII. Armeekorps; 10 February 1943 – 8 June 1943	Succeeded by General der Infanterie Paul Völckers
Preceded by Generalleutnant Siegfried Thomaschki	Commander of 11. Infanterie-Division; 7 September 1943 – April 1944	Succeeded by Generalleutnant Hellmuth Reymann
