= Alfred von Böckmann =

German general (1859–1921)

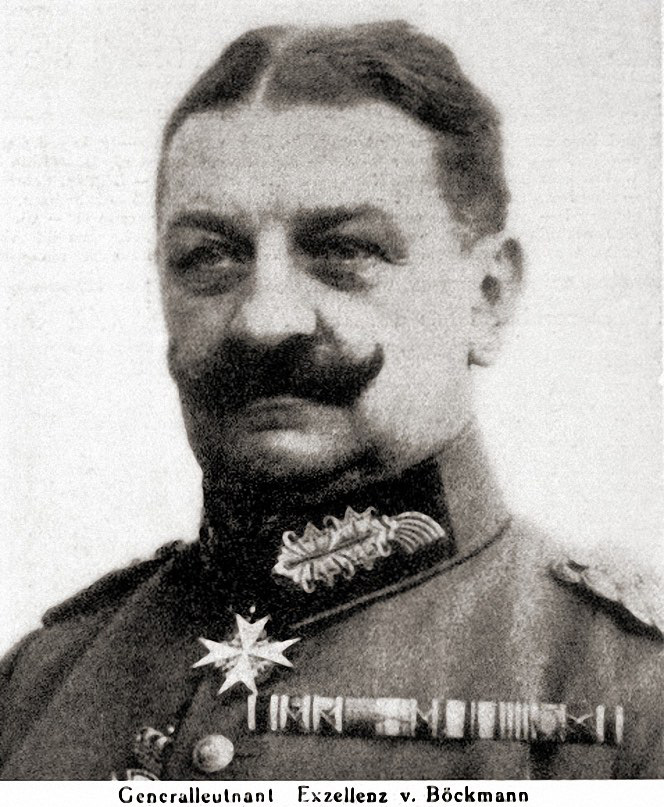
- Born: 29 September 1859; Potsdam, Brandenburg, Prussia, German Confederation
- Died: 19 November 1921 (aged 62); Bad Wildungen, Hesse-Nassau, Prussia, German Reich
- Spouse: ∞ Stade 1883 Klara Adolfine Ernestine von Wersebe
- Relatives: Herbert von Böckmann (oldest son)
- Military career
- Allegiance: Germany
- Branch: Imperial German Army
- Service years: 1880–1919
- Rank: Generalleutnant
- Commands: III Reserve Corps; XIV Corps; Guards Corps; III Corps
- Conflicts: World War I: East Prussian campaign; Battle of Tannenberg; Hundred Days Offensive; Fifth Battle of Ypres

Alfred Hans Emil Friedrich von Böckmann (1859-1921) was a German general in World War I. He commanded several corps throughout the war and commanded the Guard Corps during the Fifth Battle of Ypres.

== Early Military Career ==
Alfred von Böckmann was born on 22 September 1859 in Potsdam. After joining the Imperial German Army, Böckmann reached the rank of lieutenant in 1880 and in April 1907, he became chief of staff of the XIV Corps located in Karlsruhe. In March 1911, Böckmann was given command of a regiment stationed in Schwerin and in November 1912, he became the commander of the 75th Infantry Brigade on 8 February 1914, which was based in Allenstein.

== World War I ==
At the beginning of World War I, the 75th Infantry Brigade was part of the 37th Division, which was part of the 8th Army on the Eastern Front. Commanding the 75th Infantry Brigade, Böckmann participated in the decisive German victory at the Battle of Tannenberg. After a month and a half in command of the 75th Brigade, in mid-September 1914, Böckmann was given a new command of the 41st Division, which he commanded for two months.

After Otto von Below became the commander of the 8th Army in November 1914, Böckmann was made Chief of the General Staff of the 8th Army, with which he participated in the Second Battle of the Masurian Lakes. With the formation of the Army of the Niemen from units of the 8th Army, in May 1915, Böckmann became its chief of staff. When Otto von Below was transferred to the Macedonian front and became the commander of Army Group Below, Böckmann became the chief of staff of the said army group. He remained the chief of staff of the army group even after Friedrich von Scholtz took over command of the same from Below.

In August 1917, Böckmann became commander of the III Reserve Corps which he commanded until September when he received command of the XIV Corps. Böckmann didn't command the corps for too long because by November 1917, he became the commander of the prestigious Guards Corps. He commanded the Guards Corps until August 1918 when he took command of the III Corps until the end of the war. After the end of the war, von Böckamnn retired from the Preliminary Reichswehr with effect from 30 September 1919.

== Death ==
Alfred von Böckmann died on 18 November 1921 at the age of 62 in Bad Wildungen.

== Awards and decorations ==
- Order of the Red Eagle, III Class with the bow and with a crown
- Order of the Crown, II Class
- Service award
- Order of Albert the Bear, II Class (Commander)
- Order of the Zähringer Lion, II Class (Commander)
- Military Merit Order, Officer
- Order of Philip the Magnanimous, II Class (Commander)
- Order of the Griffon, Commander
- Princely Reuss Honor Cross, II Class
- Albert Order, Officer's Cross
- Cross of Honor of Schwarzburg, III Class
- Iron Cross (1914), II and I Class
- House Order of Hohenzollern, Commander with swords in March 1915
- Order of the Red Eagle, II Class with Oak Leaves and Swords in January 1916
- Pour le Mérite, 8 October 1916
- Pour le Mérite with oak leaves on 1 June 1917
