= Maximilian Felzmann =

Austrian general (1894–1962)

- Born: 22 April 1894
- Died: 8 June 1962 (aged 68)
- Military career
- Allegiance: Nazi Germany
- Branch: Wehrmacht
- Rank: General of the Artillery
- Commands: 251st Infantry Division; XXXXVI Panzer Corps; XXVII Army Corps
- Conflicts: World War II
- Awards: Knight's Cross of the Iron Cross with Oak Leaves

Maximilian Felzmann (22 April 1894 – 8 June 1962) was an Austrian general (General of the Artillery) in the Wehrmacht during World War II, and a recipient of the Knight's Cross of the Iron Cross with Oak Leaves. He first joined military on 18 August 1913. He was promoted in the order: Obstlt 1.1.39, Oberst 1.2.41, Gen. Maj. 1.6.43, Gen. Lt. 1.12.43, Gen. d. Art 1.1.45

== Awards and decorations ==
- Iron Cross (1939) 2nd Class (18 May 1940) & 1st Class (27 July 1940)
- German Cross in Gold on 29 January 1942 as Oberst in Artillerie-Regiment 251
- Knight's Cross of the Iron Cross with Oak Leaves
  - Knight's Cross on 28 November 1943 as Generalmajor and commander of 251. Infanterie-Division
  - 643rd Oak Leaves on 3 November 1944 as Generalleutnant and commander of Korpsabteilung E

Military offices
Preceded by Generalleutnant Karl Burdach	Commander of 251. Infanterie-Division; 10 March 1943 – 10 October 1944	Succeeded by Generalleutnant Werner Heucke
Preceded by General der Panzertruppe Smilo Freiherr von Lüttwitz	Commander of XXXXVI. Panzerkorps; 29 August 1944 – 20 September 1944	Succeeded by General der Panzertruppe Walter Fries
Preceded by General der Infanterie Helmuth Prieß	Commander of XXVII. Armeekorps; 26 October 1944 – 14 April 1945	Succeeded by General der Infanterie Walter Hörnlein
