= Rudolf Bamler =

German general during World War II

- Born: 6 May 1896; Osterburg (Altmark), Province of Saxony, Prussia, German Empire
- Died: 13 March 1972 (aged 77); Groß Glienicke, East Germany
- Military career
- Allegiance: German Empire; Weimar Republic; Nazi Germany NKFD (to 1945) East Germany
- Branch: Prussian Army; Reichsheer; Army (Wehrmacht); Kasernierte Volkspolizei
- Service years: 1914–1945; 1948–1956
- Rank: Generalleutnant of the Wehrmacht; Generalmajor of the KVP
- Commands: 12th Infantry Division
- Conflicts: World War I World War II
- Other work: Main Directorate for Reconnaissance

Rudolf Bamler (6 May 1896 – 13 March 1972) was a German general during World War II. Although Bamler was a member of the Nazi Party he would later serve as a leading member of the East German security forces.

== Early life ==
Bamler was born in Osterburg (Altmark), Saxony-Anhalt, the son of Protestant clergyman Johannes Bamler (born 1864) and his wife Anna Garlipp (1873-1932). He enlisted in the Prussian Army and served in the First World War with the 15th Division.

== Abwehr ==
Bamler was attached to the Abwehr as the head of section III (counterespionage) and here he helped to encourage closer co-operation with the Gestapo and Sicherheitsdienst (SD). This role also meant that Bamler maintained a network of informers across German society rivalled only by that of the SD. Although he had a difficult personal relationship with his superior Wilhelm Canaris the two co-operated closely in supporting Canaris' friend Francisco Franco during the Spanish Civil War.

== World War II ==
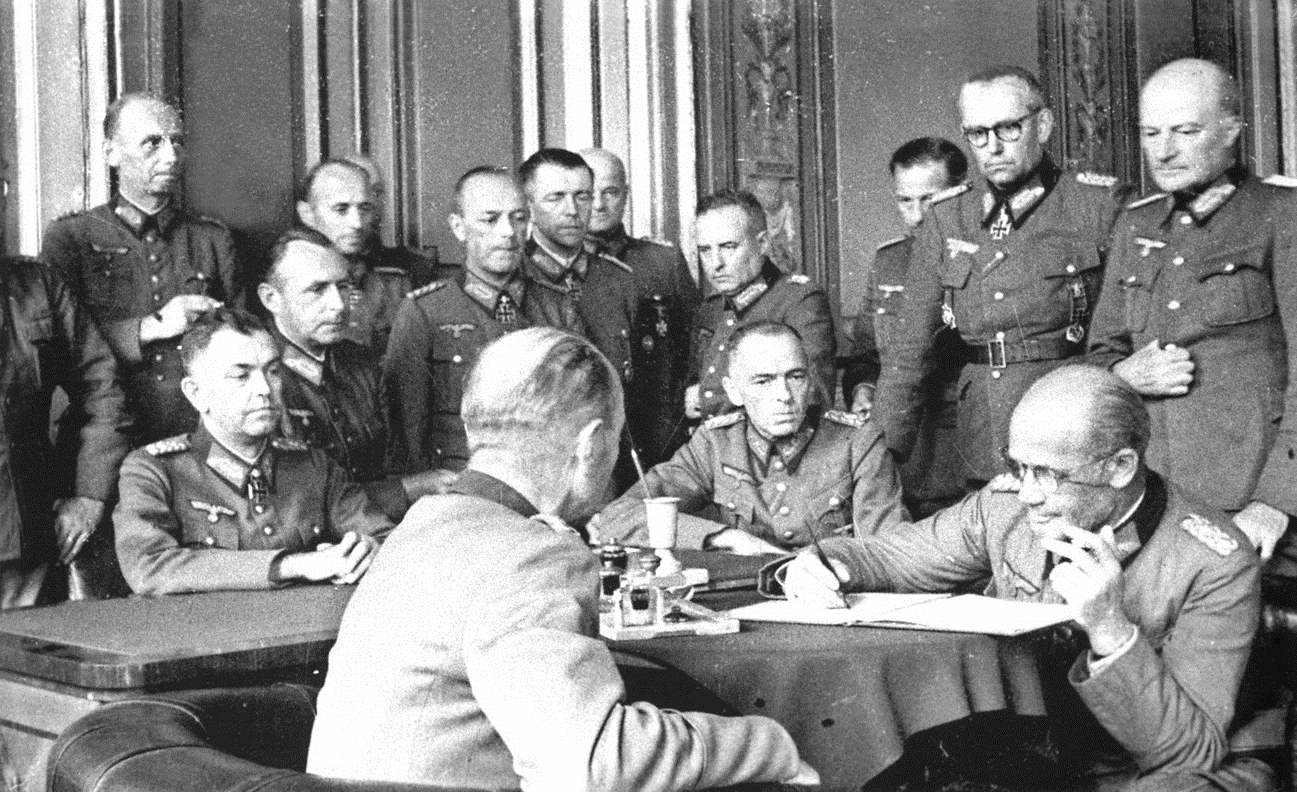
A group of German generals in captivity sign an appeal to German officers as part of the NKFD. Bamler is second from the right amongst those sitting.

Following the outbreak of the Second World War Bamler was appointed Chief of Staff of Wehrkreis VII (Munich) before a transfer to the same role in XX (Danzig). Bamler was then made Chief of Staff to the XXXXVII Panzer Corps in 1940. From 1942 to 1944 he was Chief of Staff to the German Army in Norway under Generaloberst Nikolaus von Falkenhorst, having risen to the rank of lieutenant general.

Bamler was then moved to the Eastern Front; from June 1 to June 27, he was commander of the 121st Infantry Division, before being replaced by Helmuth Prieß. He commanded, simultaneously, the 12th Infantry Division, and was in turn succeeded by Gerhard Engel. Bamler's command concluded with his surrender to the Red Army on 27 June 1944 of the 12th Infantry Division and Mogilev during Operation Bagration. Following his capture, he later defected to the Soviet Union.

== Later years ==
Bamler settled in East Germany and worked as a Stasi police officer there from 1946 until his retirement in 1962. He also held the rank of major general in the Kasernierte Volkspolizei. He died in Groß Glienicke aged 77.
