= 6th Bavarian Reserve Division =

Unit of the Royal Bavarian Army

- 6. Bayerische Reserve-Division
- Active: 1914–19
- Country: German Empire
- Allegiance: Kingdom of Bavaria
- Branch: Bavarian Army
- Type: Infantry
- Size: Approx. 15,000
- Engagements: World War I: Race to the Sea; First Battle of Ypres; Battle of Fromelles; Battle of the Somme; Battle of Arras (1917); German spring offensive; Battle of the Aisne; Champagne-Marne; Battle of Passchendale

The 6th Bavarian Reserve Division (6. Bayerische Reserve-Division) was a unit of the Royal Bavarian Army, part of the German Army, in World War I. The division was formed on 10 September 1914 and organized over the next month. The division was disbanded in 1919 during the demobilization of the German Army after World War I.

6th Bavarian Reserve Division was raised and recruited from Bavaria's Ist and IIIrd Army Corps Districts. As a reserve division, it consisted mainly of recalled reservists. A considerable number of war volunteers were taken in, also. Among the latter was the division's most well-known soldier, Adolf Hitler, an Austrian-born Gefreiter in the Bavarian Reserve Infantry Regiment 16.

== Combat chronicle ==
The division entered the war on 30 October 1914, when it entered the First Battle of Ypres, part of the so-called Race to the Sea. The division remained in Flanders thereafter, and fought in numerous actions, including the Battle of Fromelles in July 1916 and the latter phases of the Battle of the Somme in October 1916. In the Spring of 1917, the division fought in the Battle of Arras. It remained in the Flanders region until August 1917, when it was transferred to Upper Alsace for rest and then to the Chemin des Dames region. In 1918, it participated in the German spring offensive. In the Spring and Summer offensives and counteroffensives, it faced French and American troops in several battles, including on the Aisne and Champagne-Marne. The division returned to the Flanders region in August 1918, where it remained until the end of the war. Allied intelligence rated the division as a second class division, noting that while trained as an assault division, it was more often employed as a follow-on unit.

== Order of battle on 8 December 1914 ==
The order of battle of the 6th Bavarian Reserve Division on 8 December 1914 was as follows:

- 12. Bayerische Reserve-Infanterie-Brigade
  - Kgl. Bayerisches Reserve-Infanterie-Regiment 16
  - Kgl. Bayerisches Reserve-Infanterie-Regiment 17
- 14. Bayerische Reserve-Infanterie-Brigade
  - Kgl. Bayerisches Reserve-Infanterie-Regiment 20
  - Kgl. Bayerisches Reserve-Infanterie-Regiment 21
- Kgl. Bayerisches Reserve-Kavallerie-Regiment 6
- Kgl. Bayerisches Reserve-Feldartillerie-Regiment 6
- Kgl. Bayerisches Reserve-Fußartillerie-Bataillon 6
- Kgl. Bayerische Reserve-Pionier-Kompanie 6

== Order of battle on 10 April 1918 ==
Divisions underwent many changes during the war, with regiments moving from division to division, and some being destroyed and rebuilt. The 6th Bavarian Reserve Division was triangularized in January 1917, losing the 14th Bavarian Reserve Infantry Brigade headquarters and the 21st Bavarian Reserve Infantry Regiment. Cavalry was reduced, engineers increased, and an artillery command and a divisional signals command were created. The 6th Bavarian Reserve Division's order of battle on 10 April 1918 was as follows:

- 12. bayerische Reserve-Infanterie-Brigade
  - Kgl. Bayerisches Reserve-Infanterie-Regiment 16
  - Kgl. Bayerisches Reserve-Infanterie-Regiment 17
  - Kgl. Bayerisches Reserve-Infanterie-Regiment 20
- 2. Eskadron/Kgl. Bayerisches Reserve-Kavallerie-Regiment 6
- Kgl. Bayerischer Artillerie-Kommandeur 18
- Kgl. Bayerisches Reserve-Feldartillerie-Regiment 6
- Kgl. Bayerisches Fußartillerie-Bataillon 12
- Stab Kgl. Bayerisches Pionier-Bataillon 19
- Kgl. Bayerische Reserve-Pionier-Kompanie 6
- Kgl. Bayerische Reserve-Pionier-Kompanie 7
- Kgl. Bayerische Minenwerfer-Kompanie 206
- Kgl. Bayerischer Divisions-Nachrichten-Kommandeur 406

== Gallery ==
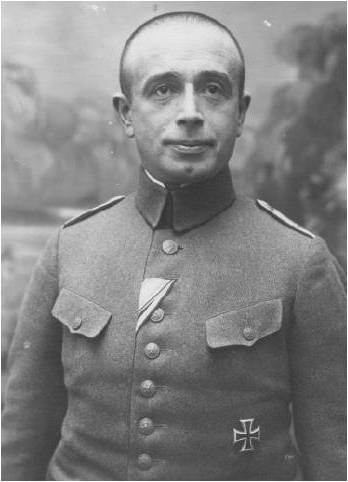
Lt Hugo Gutmann

A young Hitler (farthest left at bottom row) posing with other German soldiers and their dog Fuchsl.

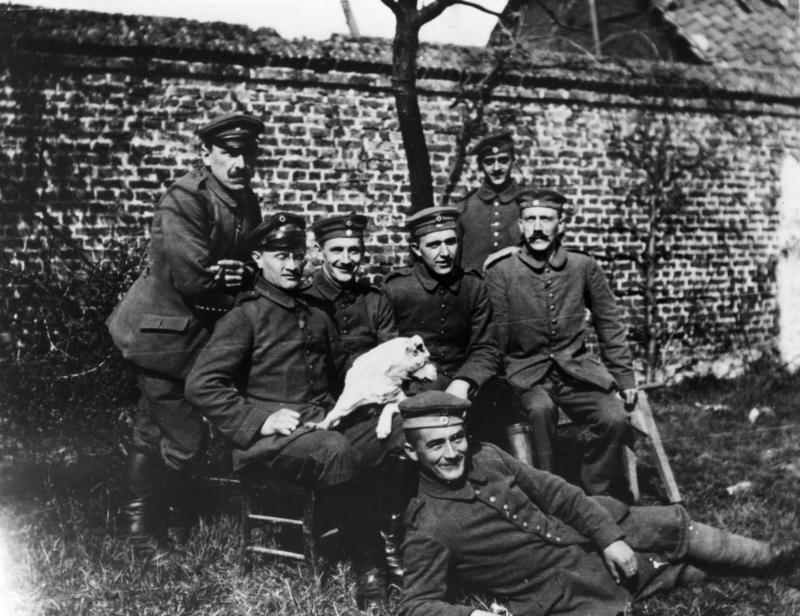
Hitler sitting at far right among soldiers of the "List" regiment and Fuchsl. From left to right, standing: Sperl (Munich), lithographer (?), Max Mund (Munich), gilder; Left to right, sitting: Georg Wimmer (Munich), tram worker, Josef Inkofer (Munich), Lausamer (killed in action), Adolf Hitler; In front: Balthasar Brandmayer (Bad Aibling), bricklayer.

Photograph of the 21st Reserve Infantry Regiment, 14th of May, 1916
