= Regimental Diploma List =

The Regimental Diploma "List" was a certificate of service issued to veterans of the 16th Bavarian Reserve Infantry, known as the "List Regiment (16th RIR)" for service during the First World War. The certificates were endorsed and signed by Oberst Julius von List and were mostly issued to regimental members between the years 1918 and 1920. The most famous recipient of a List regimental diploma is Adolf Hitler who had served under the commander of List, through his company officer Hugo Gutmann.
