= 251st Infantry Division =

World War II German Army division

The 251st Infantry Division (German: 251. Infanterie-Division) was an infantry division of the German Heer during World War II.

The division was active in two iterations: the initial 251st Infantry Division was deployed in 1939 and dissolved in November 1943, but another formation by the same name was deployed in September 1944, essentially destroyed in January and formally dissolved in March 1945.

== History ==
=== First deployment of the 251st Infantry Division, 1939 – 1943 ===
The 251st Infantry Division was formed on the day of German general mobilization, 26 August 1939, as part of the fourth Aufstellungswelle in the Hersfeld area in Wehrkreis IX. It initially consisted of the Infantry Regiments 451, 459, and 471, as well as the Artillery Regiment 251. The initial commander was Hans Kratzert.

- Infantry Regiment 451 was formed in the Gotha area using the Supplement Battalion 12(S) Hildburghausen as Battalion I, the Supplement Battalion 15 Kassel as Battalion III, and the Supplement Battalion 71 Gotha as Battalion II.
- Infantry Regiment 459 was formed in the Alsfeld area using the Supplement Battalions 81 Homburg, 88 Hanau, and 106 Aschaffenburg. These supplement battalions were numbered I through III within the regiment.
- Infantry Regiment 471 was formed in the Butzbach area using the Supplement Battalions 36 Butzbach, 57 Weilburg, and 116 Giessen. These supplement battalions were numbered I through III within the regiment.
- The four detachments of Artillery Regiment 251, numbered I through IV, were raised in Siegen, Frankfurt am Main, Aschaffenburg, and Fulda.

On 12 December 1939, the 251st Infantry Division passed the 4th Detachment of Artillery Regiment 251, which was motorized, to the army reserves, and in return received the 4th Detachment of Artillery Regiment 239, which was horse-drawn.

On 31 January 1940, the 251st Infantry Division transferred the 3rd Battalion of Infantry Regiment 471 and the 2nd Battery of Artillery Regiment 251 to the newly formed 299th Infantry Division, part of the eighth Aufstellungswelle.

On 1 October 1940, the 251st Infantry Division lost a third of its personnel, including the staff and 3rd Battalion of Infantry Regiment 451, the 3rd Battalion of Infantry Regiment 459, the 3rd Battalion of Infantry Regiment 471, the 1st Detachment of Artillery Regiment 251, and the 4th Detachment of Artillery Regiment 239, to the newly formed 129th Infantry Division. The lost formations were replaced to bring the 251st Infantry Division back to regular strength.

In May 1941, the 251st Infantry Division was transferred to East Prussia in preparation for Operation Barbarossa.

On 6 August 1941, Kratzert was replaced by Karl Burdach as divisional commander.

The 251st Infantry Division was dissolved on 2 November 1943. The division staff subsequently formed the staff of Corps Detachment E. The first battalions of Regiments 451 and 459 joined the Corps Detachment E as Division Group 251, whereas the staffs of Regiments 459 and 471 formed the staffs of Jäger Regiments 54 and 52.

On 10 March 1943, Burdach was replaced by Maximilian Felzmann as divisional commander. He was briefly substituted by Eugen König in early April, then assumed command again until 15 November 1943.

=== Corps Detachment E ===
The former and subsequent 251st Infantry Division was known as Corps Detachment E between November 1943 and September 1944.

=== Second deployment of the 251st Infantry Division, 1944 – 1945 ===
Following a directive on 27 September 1944, Corps Detachment E was once again restructured to once more become the 251st Infantry Division. This second iteration of the division initially contained the Grenadier Regiments 184, 448, and 451, which were formed from the Division Groups 86, 137, and 251, respectively. The personnel of the three regiments hailed from Wehrkreis VI, Wehrkeis XVII, and Wehrkreis IX, respectively. Grenadier Regiment 451 from Wehrkreis IX was the only infantry regiment that served both at the end of the first iteration as well as at the beginning of the second iteration of the 251st Infantry Division. Additionally, the second iteration of the 251st Infantry Division was equipped by the Division Fusilier Battalion 251 and the Artillery Regiment 251. On 10 October 1944, Werner Heucke was appointed divisional commander.

On 1 January 1945, the 251st Infantry Division (then part of 9th Army under Army Group A) had a strength of 11,488 men.

The 251st Infantry Division was battered in the Warka bridgehead in January 1945 and effectively destroyed during the retreat to West Prussia. In March 1945, the division was dissolved for the final time. Its remaining officers were moved to one of the desperately assembled final formations of the Wehrmacht, the Infantry Division Friedrich Ludwig Jahn. Werner Heucke was still in command until the dissolution of the 251st Infantry Division.

== Superior formations ==
Organizational chart of the 251st Infantry Division
Year	Month	Army Corps	Army	Army Group	Area
1939	September	Army reserves	5th Army	Army Group C	Eifel
1939	October – December	V	4th Army	Army Group B	Eifel
1940	January	V	4th Army	Army Group B	Eifel
1940	May	V	4th Army	Army Group A	Belgium
1940	June	OKH reserves			Lille
1940	July	XXVIII	6th Army	Army Group A	Brest / Brittany
1940	August	XXVIII	6th Army	Army Group B	Brest / Brittany
1940	September – October	XXVIII	6th Army	Army Group C	Brest / Brittany
1940	November – December	XXVIII	6th Army	Army Group D	Brest / Brittany
1941	January – April	XXVIII	6th Army	Army Group D	Brest / Brittany
1941	May	Army Group reserves		Army Group C	East Prussia
1941	June	XXIII	16th Army	Army Group North	East Prussia
1941	July	Army Group reserves		Army Group North	Daugavpils
1941	August	L	9th Army	Army Group Center	Nevel
1941	September – November	XXIII	9th Army	Army Group Center	Kalinin
1941	December	XXVII	9th Army	Army Group Center	Rzhev
1942	January	XXVII	9th Army	Army Group Center	Rzhev
1942	February – March	VI	9th Army	Army Group Center	Rzhev
1942	April	XXXXVI	9th Army	Army Group Center	Rzhev
1942	May – July	XXVII	9th Army	Army Group Center	Rzhev
1942	August – October	VI	9th Army	Army Group Center	Rzhev
1942	November – December	XXVII	9th Army	Army Group Center	Rzhev
1943	January	XXVII	9th Army	Army Group Center	Rzhev
1943	February	Corps Burdach	9th Army	Army Group Center	Rzhev
1943	March	Army reserves	2nd Panzer Army	Army Group Center	Oryol
1943	April – June	XX	2nd Panzer Army	Army Group Center	Oryol
1943	July – August	XX	9th Army	Army Group Center	Oryol
1943	September	LVI	2nd Army	Army Group Center	Desna
1943	October	XXXXVI	2nd Army	Army Group Center	Gomel
1943	November	Restructured to Corps Detachment E			
November 1943 – October 1944: Corps Detachment E
1944	October – November	VIII	9th Army	Army Group Center	Warka bridgehead
1944	December	VIII	9th Army	Army Group A	Warka bridgehead
1945	January	VIII	9th Army	Army Group A	Warka bridgehead
1945	February – March	XXVII	2nd Army	Army Group Vistula	West Prussia

== Noteworthy individuals ==
- Hans Kratzert, commanding general of the 251st Infantry Division (26 August 1939 – 6 August 1941).
- Karl Burdach, commanding general of the 251st Infantry Division (6 August 1941 – 10 March 1943).
- Maximilian Felzmann, commanding general of the 251st Infantry Division (10 March 1943 – April 1943).
- Eugen König, commanding general of the 251st Infantry Division (April 1943 – 15 November 1943).
- Werner Heucke, commanding general of the 251st Infantry Division (10 October 1944 – 4 March 1945).
