= Hugo Gutmann =

German Jewish army officer (1880–1962)

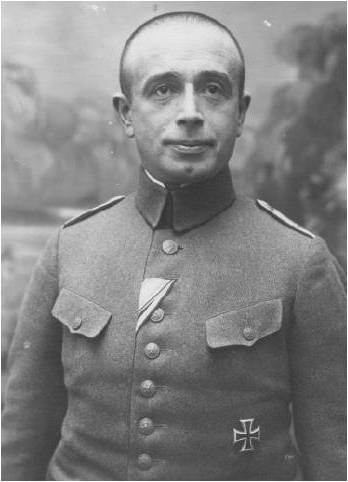
- Gutmann, c. 1918
- Born: 19 November 1880; Nuremberg, Kingdom of Bavaria, German Empire
- Died: 22 June 1962 (aged 81); San Diego, California, U.S.
- Military career
- Allegiance: German Empire
- Branch: Artillery branch, Bavarian Army
- Service years: 1902–1919
- Rank: Leutnant
- Unit: Regiment "List"
- Commands: 16th Bavarian Reserve Regiment
- Awards: Iron Cross, First Class

Hugo Gutmann (19 November 1880 – 22 June 1962), later known as Henry G. Grant, was a German Jewish army officer, notable for being one of Adolf Hitler's superior officers in World War I. During the war, he recommended Hitler for the award of the Iron Cross.

== Early life and army career ==
Gutmann was born on 19 November 1880 in Nuremberg to Salomon and Emilie Gutmann. In 1902, Gutmann joined the Bavarian Army and had risen to the rank of highest ranking NCO (Feldwebel) by 1904, when he was transferred to the reserves. When World War I began in 1914, Gutmann was recalled and he joined a unit known (after its first commander) as the "List" Regiment. On 15 April 1915, he was promoted to Lieutenant (Leutnant) and appointed as a company commander and acting adjutant for the Regiment's artillery battalion.

Throughout most of 1918, from 29 January to 31 August, Lt. Gutmann served as Adolf Hitler's direct superior. Gutmann later recommended Hitler's award of the Iron Cross First Class (a decoration rarely awarded to one of Hitler's Gefreiter rank). The decoration was presented to Hitler on 4 August 1918, near Soissons, by the regimental commander, Major von Tubeuf. Hitler wore this medal throughout the remainder of his career, including while serving as Führer of Nazi Germany.

Gutmann himself was an Iron Cross recipient, having been awarded the Iron Cross 2nd Class on 2 December 1914 (incidentally the same day as Hitler), as well as the Iron Cross 1st Class on 4 December 1915.

== Post-World War I and Nazi years ==
On 8 February 1919, Gutmann was demobilized from the German Army, but was still maintained on the army rolls as a reserve lieutenant. He married later that year and went on to father two children. During the 1920s, Gutmann owned and operated an office-furniture shop that was originally owned by his father in Vordere Sterngasse 3 in Nuremberg.

In the autumn of 1933, Gutmann applied for a veteran's war pension, which was granted (President Hindenburg had passed several decrees protecting Jewish war veterans from the rising tide of anti-Jewish sentiment). In 1935, after the passing of the Nuremberg Laws, Gutmann lost his German citizenship and was formally discharged from the veteran rolls of the army, but still continued to receive a pension, possibly due to Hitler's influence.

In 1938, Gutmann was arrested by the Gestapo, but released as a result of the influence of SS personnel who knew his history. In 1939, Gutmann and his family left for Belgium as World War II was beginning in Europe. Later on 14 May 1940, they fled to France. On 28 August 1940, he emigrated to the United States on the SS Excalibur from Lisbon to New York City, just prior to the German invasion of the Low Countries.

== Post-World War II ==
After arriving to the United States, he changed his name to Henry Grant, inspired by a W. T. Grant store that he walked by. Gutmann lived in St. Louis, Missouri, and worked as a typewriter and furniture salesman. He was married and had two children.

Gutmann eventually retired in 1961 and later died in San Diego, California, on 22 June 1962 from cancer. He was buried at Home of Peace Cemetery in San Diego.

== Portrayal in media ==
In the 2003 television mini-series Hitler: The Rise of Evil, Hugo Gutmann was portrayed by actor Brendan Hughes.
