= Baltic Cross =

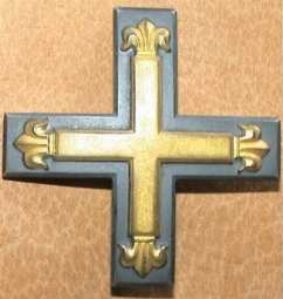
Baltic Cross

The Baltic Cross (German: Das Baltenkreuz) was a military decoration of the German Weimar Republic. It was created in 1919 by the Baltic National Committee (Baltischer Nationalausschuss), the political representation of German-Baltic population of southern Livonia and Courland (roughly equivalent to parts of modern Latvia).

The Cross was awarded to officers, NCOs and men of the Baltic Landeswehr and voluntary groups who had fought in the Baltic states during 1918–19 for at least three months against the Bolshevik armies. Ceremonies are known from July 1919. The Baltic National Committee in Jelgava, in Courland (now in Latvia), issued numbered warrants for the award. A total of 21,839 Baltic Crosses were awarded. The Cross was accepted as a state-approved decoration of the German Reich on 16 May 1933 and was allowed to be worn. State approval was continued by the Federal Republic of Germany.

The Baltic Cross is a black oxidised metal cross superimposed with a gilt cross of the coat of arms of the Grand Master of the Teutonic Knights, ending in fleurs de lys; the reverse is plain. The ribbon is in the blue and white colours of the Baltic Landeswehr. Members of the Baltic National Committee established the design. The Cross could be worn as a breast pin fixed on the left side of the tunic chest or from the medal ribbon. Occasionally, ribbon and plug crosses were worn simultaneously. Crosses with ribbon, ring, and eyelet are irregular and only intended for large orders. The alternative methods of wear have led to descriptions of the award having two classes, but this is not true.
