= Honour Cross of the World War 1914/1918 =

Honour Cross of the World War 1914/1918 Ehrenkreuz des Weltkrieges 1914/1918
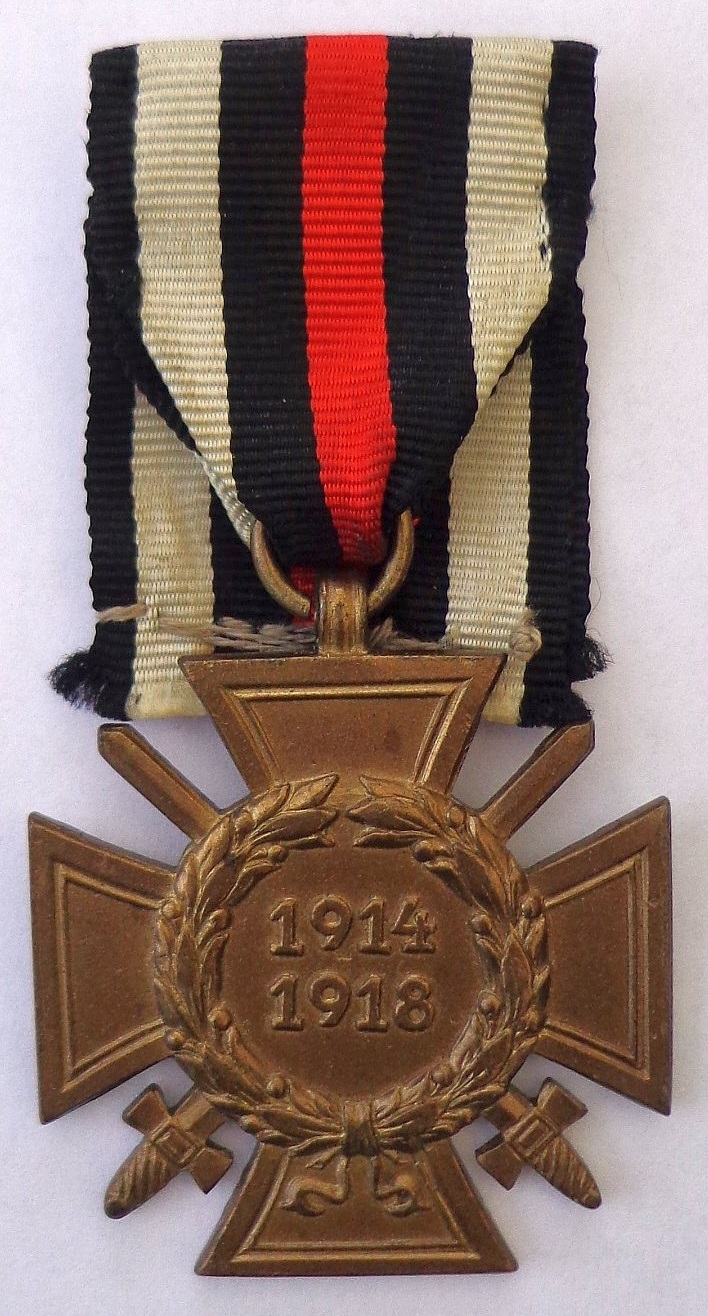
- Honour Cross with swords (for front-line veterans)
- Type: First World War Service Medal
- Presented by: Nazi Germany
- Eligibility: All German and Austrian participants in the war or their next-of-kin
- Status: Obsolete
- First award: 13 July 1934
- Final award: 1944

Highlights
- Total: 8,041,414
- Total awarded posthumously: Yes

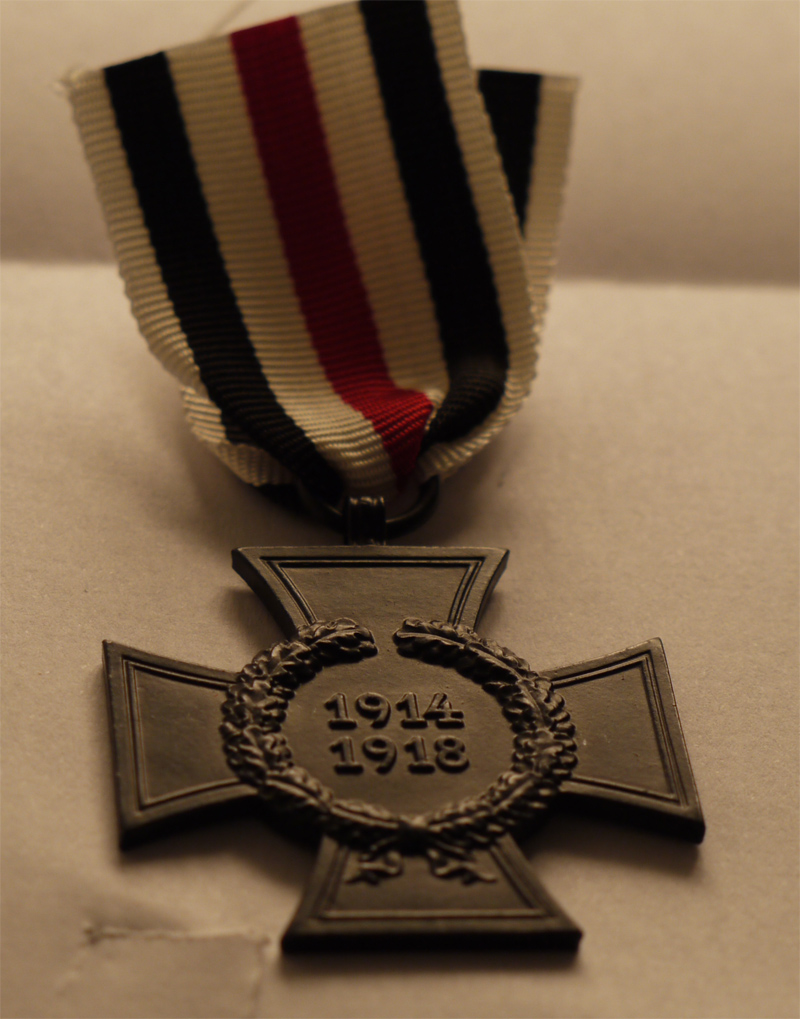
Version without swords, given to surviving widows and parents of participants who had fallen in the war.

The Honour Cross of the World War 1914/1918 (German: Ehrenkreuz des Weltkrieges 1914/1918), commonly referred to as the Hindenburg Cross or the German WWI Service Cross, was established by Field Marshal Paul von Hindenburg, President of the German Weimar Republic, by an order dated 13 July 1934, to commemorate service of the German people during the First World War. This was Germany's first official service medal for soldiers of Imperial Germany who had taken part in the war, and where they had since died it was also awarded to their surviving next-of-kin. Shortly after its issuance, the government of Nazi Germany declared the award as the only official service decoration of the First World War and further forbade the continued wearing of most German Free Corps awards on any military or paramilitary uniform of a state or Nazi Party organization.

The Honour Cross was awarded in three forms:

- - for front-line veterans, with swords
- - for non-combatant veterans, without swords
- - for surviving widows and parents of fallen participants in the war, without swords.

The Honour Cross was modelled on the reverse side of the War Commemorative Medal of 1870/71 (Preußen Kriegsdenkmünze 1870-1871), and it was designed by Eugene Godet. The medal awarded to combatants (called the Frontkämpferkreuz) displayed a laurel wreath encircling a medallion with the dates "1914 1918", along with crossed swords between the arms. The reverse side was plain, except for the manufacturer's logo. The Honour Cross for non-combatants had a wreath of oak leaves, and no swords. Both crosses were in bronze. The Honour Cross for next-of-kin (commonly known as the Widows Cross) was finished in black.

The Honour Cross was worn suspended from a ribbon with black edge stripes, two white stripes, two black stripes and a red stripe in the middle between them. The ribbon of the Honour Cross for next-of-kin had these colours in a different order, having white edge stripes, with two black stripes, white stripes on either side of a red stripe in the middle. They were frequently worn with the ribbon fashioned into a bow, with a pin on the back, which the mother or widow in question attached to her clothing. The application for this award had a time limit, which expired at the end of 1942. Each award came with an Urkunde, or certificate, which indicated which form the award took. The certificates for the next-of-kin crosses came in two types – those for widows were titled Ehrenkreuz für Witwen (Honour Cross for Widows), while those for parents were called Ehrenkreuz für Eltern (Honour Cross for Parents). The award was ranked above other service and occupation medals, but below other awarded combat medals.

The number of awards given was:

- for combatants 6,202,883
- for non-combatants 1,120,449
- for widows 345,132
- for parents 372,950
- total 8,041,414

By a decree dated 30 November 1938, the State Minister of the Interior introduced these awards into the Ostmark (the name of Austria after it was annexed by Nazi Germany). By 1940, it had also been approved for persons of German heritage from seized lands of the Sudetenland, Czechoslovakia, Danzig, Saar and Memel. Awarding of the cross to war participants of German heritage continued after the deadline for applications had closed within the previous boundaries of Germany. Such Honour Crosses were still being awarded as late as 1944. For all attached military personnel outside these regions, the Führer, through the ordinance of 30 June 1942, had already ordered approval of these awards.

== See also ==
- Karl Troop Cross, the Austrian equivalent
- British War Medal
