= Walter Lange (Wehrmacht officer) =

Dr. med. dent. Walter Lange
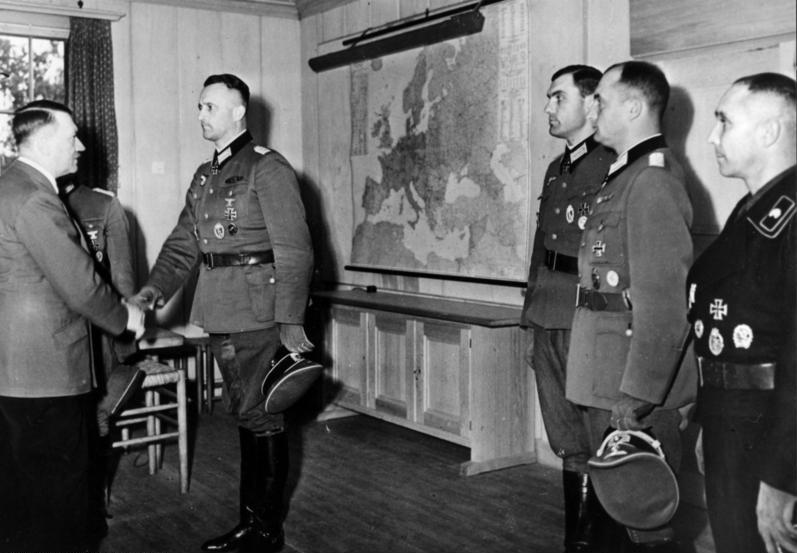
- Oak Leaves ceremony on 15 September 1943 at the Führerhauptquartier "Wolfschanze", from left to right: Adolf Hitler, Paul Schultz (hidden), Oberst Dr. med. dent. Walter Lange, Major Theodor Tolsdorff, Oberst Günther Pape, Major Dr. med. dent. Franz Bäke
- Born: 14 July 1898; Berlin, Province of Brandenburg, Kingdom of Prussia, German Empire
- Died: 30 October 1982 (aged 84); Osnabrück, Lower Saxony, West Germany
- Relatives: ∞ 14 April 1930 Elisabeth Thran
- Military career
- Allegiance: German Empire; Weimar Republic; Nazi Germany
- Branch: Imperial German Army; Reichsheer; German Army
- Service years: 1916–29; 1936–45
- Rank: Oberst
- Commands: Grenadier-Regiment 43; Grenadier-Regiment 917
- Conflicts: World War I World War II
- Awards: Iron Cross; German Cross in Gold; Knight's Cross of the Iron Cross with Oak Leaves
- Other work: Dentist

Walter Georg Heinrich Lange (14 July 1898 – 30 October 1982) was a German officer, finally Colonel, regimental commander and recipient of the Knight's Cross of the Iron Cross with Oak Leaves of the Wehrmacht in World War II as well as a dentist with a doctorate.

== Life ==
Walter was born the son of Georg Lange, Hospital Inspector in Berlin, and his wife Wilhelmine "Minna," née Elyss.

=== First World War ===
Walter Lange volunteered with the Prussian Army on 21 November 1916, serving with the 4th Foot Guards and then as of 16 January 1917, after basic training, with the Infantry Regiment No. 422 on the Western Front.

=== Inter-war ===
From 27 December 1918 to 12 August 1919, he served with the Freikorps "Petsch", subordinated to the Grenzschutz Ost. He was then taken over by the Reichswehr-Infanterie-Regiment 39. On 2 January 1921, he was transferred to the 2nd (Prussian) Infantry Regiment. Promoted to 2nd Lieutenant in 1923 and 1st Lieutenant in 1928, he resigned on 31 December 1929 to attend dental school. Lange graduated as a doctor of medical dentistry (Dr. med. dent. (Note: In German a Doctor of Medical Dentistry is abbreviated as Dr. med. dent. (Doctor medicinae dentariae).)) at the University of Königsberg in 1934. In 1936, he re-enlisted as a reservist of the Landwehr and was promoted to Captain on 1 July 1938.

=== Second World War ===
At the start of the war, he was recalled, taking part in the Poland campaign with Landwehr Infanterie Regiment 162. In May 1941, Lange was assigned to command of the 2nd Battalion of his regiment, leading it at the start of Operation Barbarossa and being severely wounded on 26 June 1941. He then was transferred to Grenadier Regiment 43 on 15 October 1942 as commander of the III. Battalion and, on 1 November 1942, was appointed regimental commander, leading it in the fighting around Lake Ladoga. On 30 April 1943, he was appointed to an active officer.

He was awarded the Oak Leaves to his Knight's Cross of the Iron Cross on 13 September 1943, in recognition of his contribution to the fighting around Lake Ladoga. On 27 February 1944, he was withdrawn from front-line service and assigned to the Führerreserve. Lange assumed command of Grenadier Regiment 917 on 8 May 1944 in the south of France. He was captured by the French on 30 July 1944 not far from the invasion front.

== Promotions ==
- 21 November 1916 Kriegsfreiwilliger-Grenadier (Volunteer Grenadier)
- 19 December 1917 Gefreiter (Private E-2/Lance Corporal)
- 10 April 1918 Unteroffizier (NCO/Corporal/Junior Sergeant)
- 12 September 1918 Vizefeldwebel (Vice Sergeant/Vice Staff Sergeant)
  - 6 August 1921 appointed officer candidate
- 1 August 1923 Oberfähnrich (Senior Officer Cadet)
- 1 December 1923 Leutnant (2nd Lieutenant)
- 1 February 1928 Oberleutnant (1st Lieutenant)
- 1 July 1938 Hauptmann der Landwehr (Captain of the Landwehr)
- 1 October 1941 Major der Landwehr (Major of the Landwehr)
- 1 January 1943 Oberstleutnant der Landwehr (Lieutenant Colonel of the Landwehr)
- 30 April 1943 Oberstleutnant (active Lieutenant Colonel) with effect from 1 March 1943 and Rank Seniority (RDA) from 1 January 1943 (170)
- 8 August 1943 Oberst (Colonel) with effect and Rank Seniority (RDA) from 1 July 1943 (43)

== Awards and decorations ==
- Iron Cross (1914), 2nd and 1st Class
  - 2nd Class on 24 August 1917
  - 1st Class on 2 October 1919
- Honour Cross of the World War 1914/1918 with Swords
- Repetition Clasp 1939 to the Iron Cross 1914, 2nd and 1st Class
  - 2nd Class on 24 September 1939
  - 1st Class on 30 October 1939
- Certificate of Recognition of the Commander-in-Chief of the Army on 20 July 1941
- Infantry Assault Badge in Silver on 24 July 1941
- German Cross in Gold on 14 March 1942 as Major der Landwehr in the III./Infanterie-Regiment 43
- Wound Badge (1939) in Black on 9 July 1942
- Winter Battle in the East 1941–42 Medal on 13 July 1942
- Mentioned in the Roll of Honor of the German Army on 19 November 1942
- Close Combat Clasp of the Army in Bronze
- Knight's Cross of the Iron Cross with Oak Leaves
  - Knight's Cross on 10 February 1943 as Oberstleutnant der Landwehr and Commander of Grenadier-Regiment 42/1. Infanterie-Division
  - 300th Oak Leaves on 13 September 1943 as Oberst and Commander of Grenadier-Regiment 43/1. Infanterie-Division
