= Theodor Tolsdorff =

German World War II general

- Tolsdorff was reverently called "The Lion of Vilnius"
- Born: 3 November 1909; Estate Lehnarten, Kreis Oletzko, Regierungsbezirk Gumbinnen, Province of East Prussia, Kingdom of Prussia, German Empire
- Died: 25 May 1978 (aged 68); Dortmund, North Rhine-Westphalia, West Germany
- Burial place: Cemetery Heckinghauser Strasse, Wuppertal
- Military career
- Allegiance: Germany
- Branch: Reichsheer; German Army
- Service years: 1934–1945
- Rank: Generalleutnant (lieutenant general)
- Unit: 1st Infantry Division
- Commands: 340th Volksgrenadier Division; XIII Army Corps
- Conflicts: See battles World War II: German invasion of Poland; Battle of France; Operation Barbarossa; Eastern Front; Battle of the Bulge; Western Front
- Awards: Knight's Cross of the Iron Cross with Oak Leaves, Swords and Diamonds
- Criminal information
- Criminal charge: execution of Franz Xaver Holzhey
- Penalty: 3.5 years imprisonment in 1954 (sentence never served; acquitted in 1960)

Theodor Friedrich Max Otto Hermann Tolsdorff (3 November 1909 – 25 May 1978) was a military officer in the Wehrmacht of Nazi Germany during World War II. He was one of 27 recipients of the Knight's Cross of the Iron Cross with Oak Leaves, Swords and Diamonds. In 1954 Tolsdorff was charged with manslaughter by a German court for ordering the execution of Wehrmacht captain Franz Xaver Holzhey in the closing months of the war; Holzhey had put up a red cross sign near his command post. In 1960 his case drew substantial public interest and media coverage. His charges were eventually dropped as the court determined that he acted within the military law in force at the time.

== Early life ==
Tolsdorf was born on 3 November 1909, in the family estate in Lehnarten in the Province of East Prussia, a state of the German Empire. Today it is Lenarty in the administrative district of Gmina Olecko, within Olecko County, Warmian-Masurian Voivodeship, in northern Poland. He was the youngest of four children and only son of Theodor Tolsdorff (1872–1919), who had served in the military during World War I as a Hauptmann (captain) in the artillery, and his wife Ilse Anna Auguste, née von Lenski (1884–1943).

Tolsdorff was five years old in 1914 when his mother briefly evacuated the estate following the invasion of East Prussia by the Russian First Army, led by Paul von Rennenkampf. He attended the Gymnasium (advanced secondary school) in Königsberg, present-day Kaliningrad, and following the death of his father on 19 October 1919 took over the family estate and became a farmer. He continued his education to become an administrator of his 695 hectares (1,720 acres), including 95 ha (230 acres) of forest.

On 6 April 1934, at the age of 24, he joined the 1st Infantry Regiment (Infanterie-Regiment 1) of the 1st Infantry Division of the Reichswehr in Insterburg as a rifleman (Schütze) to complete his 18-month mandatory military service. At that time, he was not yet considering a military career. On 12 October 1935, he was discharged but appointed reserve officer candidate on the same day.

Tolsdorff was promoted to Feldwebel der Reserve (sergeant of the reserves) in January 1936. On 1 July 1936, Tolsdorff was promoted from the ranks to Leutnant der Reserve (second lieutenant of the reserves), was appointed active officer on 1 July 1937 and was promoted to Oberleutnant (first lieutenant) on 1 October 1938. He was given command of 14th anti tank company (14.(Panzerjäger-)Kompanie) of the newly formed 22nd Infantry Regiment (Infanterie-Regiment 22) in the 1st Infantry Division on 1 April 1939.

== World War II ==
As commander of a company, Tolsdorff participated in the German invasion of Poland in 1939 and was awarded both classes of the Iron Cross. Tolsdorff participated in the Battle of France in 1940.

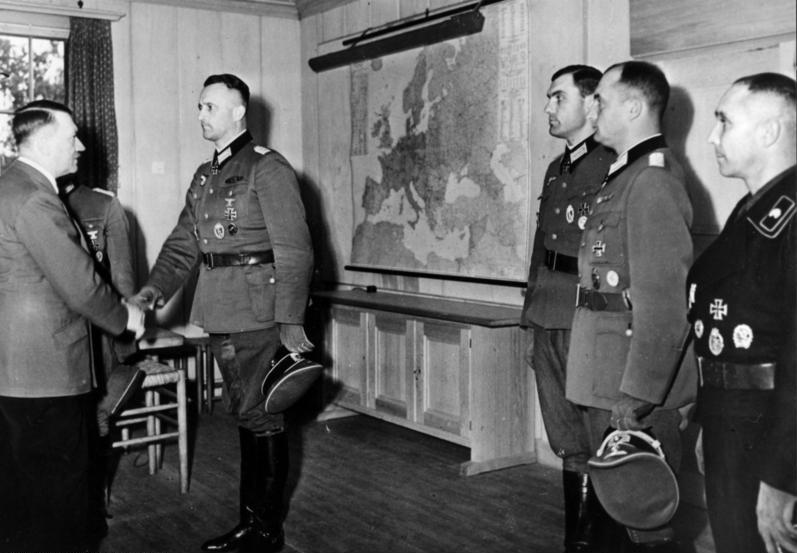
Oak Leaves ceremony, from left to right: Adolf Hitler, Walter Lange, Tolsdorff, Günther Pape, Franz Bäke

Operation Barbarossa, the German invasion of the Soviet Union, began on 22 June 1941. In November, Tolsdorff was wounded while leading an attack. He was promoted to Hauptmann (captain) on 1 December 1941 and awarded the Knight's Cross of the Iron Cross (Ritterkreuz des Eisernen Kreuzes) on 4 December 1941, while in the hospital. He returned to the front in April 1942 and participated in the heavy fighting for Shlisselburg. Tolsdorff was awarded the Knight's Cross of the Iron Cross with Oak Leaves (Ritterkreuz des Eisernen Kreuzes mit Eichenlaub) on 15 September 1943.

In June 1944, Tolsdorff participated in the fighting against the Soviet Vilnius Offensive. He was promoted to Oberst (colonel) and was awarded the Knight's Cross of the Iron Cross with Oak Leaves and Swords (Ritterkreuz des Eisernen Kreuzes mit Eichenlaub und Schwertern) on 18 July 1944. Afterwards, he was appointed commander of the new 340th Volksgrenadier Division. In mid-November, the unit moved to the Aachen-Jülich area on the west to fight U.S. forces trying to cross the Rhine. In December, the unit was withdrawn to prepare for the Ardennes offensive. The division fought as part of the 5th Panzer Army under command of Hasso von Manteuffel. On 18 March 1945, Tolsdorff received in Berlin the Knight's Cross of the Iron Cross with Oak Leaves, Swords and Diamonds. He was promoted to Generalleutnant (lieutenant general) and was delegated with the leadership of the XIII Army Corps on 22 April 1945 (arriving at headquarters on 24 April), which was stationed in Bavaria.

On 8 May 1945, he surrendered in Austria to Lt. Carwood Lipton and Robert F. Sink of the 506th Parachute Infantry Regiment of the 101st Airborne Division. Tolsdorff's convoy of 31 vehicles drove down from the mountains loaded with his personal baggage, liquor, cigars, cigarettes, and his girlfriends. Private Edward Heffron took Tolsdorff's Luger pistol and a briefcase containing Iron Cross medals and a stash of pornographic pictures.

== Personal life ==
On 4 October 1940, 1st Lieutenant Theodor Tolsdorff married Eleonore op der Beck (6 September 1921 – 15 April 1996). The marriage produced two sons. His youngest son Jürgen, born 1944, died in 1957, in an accident. His older son, Peter-Theodor (b. 11 July 1941 in Wuppertal), became a Doctor of Medicine and prominent otolaryngologist in Bad Honnef.

== Criminal charges, trials, conviction, and acquittal ==
On 9 May 1947, Tolsdorff was released from American captivity. He took various jobs, such as truck driver in the firm belonging to his father-in-law, bus driver on the route Diepholz to Hanover, and construction worker. He was arrested on 7 December 1952.

In 1954, he faced charges for the execution of Franz Xaver Holzhey, an army captain and First World War veteran, on 3 May 1945. Holzhey, without orders, had put up a red cross sign near the command post. Under military law, this constituted undermining military morale and was punishable by death. The Landgericht (court) in Traunstein had initially sentenced Tolsdorff to three and a half years.

In an appeal on points of law, the Federal Court of Justice of Germany set aside the judgment on the grounds that Tolsdorff had complied with the military penal law in force at the time in the Holzhey case, and remanded the proceedings to the Regional Court of Traunstein. On 24 June 1960, Tolsdorff was declared not guilty and cleared of all charges.

== Later life and death ==
The same year, Tolsdorff was hired by Deutsche Asphalt GmbH, presently owned by Strabag Group, and held a position of manager until 1969, when he took over the branch office in Dortmund. Tolsdorff retired on 31 December 1974.

Following a serious accident, he died on 25 May 1978 in Dortmund.

== Summary of career ==
=== Awards and decorations ===
- Wehrmacht Long Service Award, 4th Class on 16 September 1938
- Iron Cross (1939), 2nd and 1st Class
  - 2nd Class on 22 September 1939
  - 1st Class on 22 October 1939
- Wound Badge (1939) in Black, Silver and Gold
  - Black on 14 July 1940
  - Silver on 20 December 1941
  - Gold on 15 June 1942
- Infantry Assault Badge in Silver on 16 August 1941
- Winter Battle in the East 1941–42 Medal on 22 September 1942
- Tank Destruction Badge
- German Cross in Gold on 23 August 1942 as Hauptmann in the I./Infanterie-Regiment 22
- Mentioned by name in the Wehrmachtbericht on 14 July 1944
- Knight's Cross of the Iron Cross with Oak Leaves, Swords and Diamonds
  - Knight's Cross on 4 December 1941 as Oberleutnant and chief of the 14./Infanterie-Regiment 22
  - 302nd Oak Leaves on 15 September 1943 as Major and commander of the I./Füsilier-Regiment 22
  - 80th Swords on 18 July 1944 as Oberstleutnant and commander of Grenadier-Regiment 1067 and leader of the Kampfgruppe Tolsdorff
  - 25th Diamonds on 18 March 1945 as Generalmajor and commander of the 340. Volksgrenadier-Division
- Prussian Shield (de), the highest distinction of the Landsmannschaft Ostpreußen, 1977

=== Promotions ===
- 1 June 1936 Leutnant (second lieutenant)
- 1 October 1938 Oberleutnant (first lieutenant)
- 1 December 1941 Hauptmann (captain)
- 1 January 1943 Major
- 1 March 1944 Oberstleutnant (lieutenant colonel)
- 1 August 1944 Oberst (colonel)
- 30 January 1945 Brigadegeneral (brigadier general)
- 18 March 1945 Generalmajor (major general)

== In popular culture ==
A fictionalized version of the general is portrayed in the Band of Brothers, American historical series by the actor Wolf Kahler, where he addresses a cohort of surrendered German soldiers at the end of the war.

Military offices
| Preceded by General der Infanterie Walther Hahm | Commander of the LXXXII. Armeekorps; 1 April 1945 – 15 April 1945 | Succeeded by General der Infanterie Walter Lucht |
| Preceded by General der Infanterie Walter Lucht | Commander of the XIII. Armeekorps; 24 April 1945 – German capitulation | Succeeded by disbanded |
