= Vilnius offensive =

Soviet operational offensive

- Part of Operation Bagration and the Eastern Front
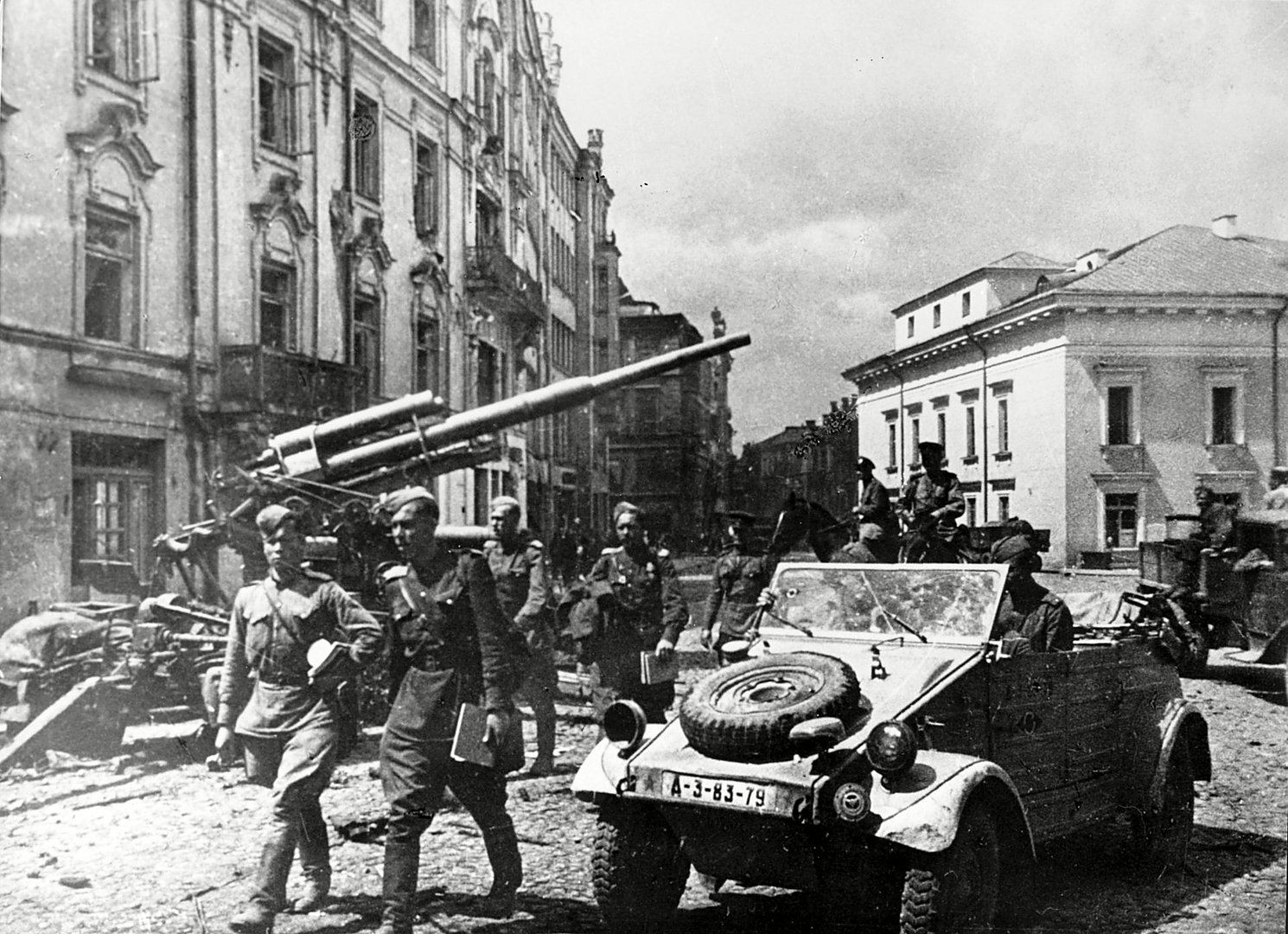
| Date | 5 July – 13 July 1944 (1 week and 1 day) |
| Location | Belarus (Minsk Region) and Lithuania (Vilnius and Alytus regions) 54°40′N 25°15′E |
| Result | Soviet victory |

Belligerents
| Soviet Union; Polish Underground State; Air support: France | Germany |

Commanders and leaders
| Ivan Chernyakhovsky; Pavel Rotmistrov | Walter Model; Dietrich von Saucken; Rainer Stahel; Theodor Tolsdorff |

Strength
| (Soviet Union) ~100,000 (Polish Underground State) 13,000 | (Nazi Germany) 7,770 |

Casualties and losses
| 50–70 tanks destroyed | 8,000 killed; 5,000 captured in Vilnius alone (Soviet estimate) |

The Vilnius offensive (Lithuanian: Vilniaus operacija; Russian: Вильнюсская наступательная операция, lit. 'Vilnius offensive operation') occurred as part of the third phase of Operation Bagration, the Soviet Red Army's strategic summer offensive against the German Wehrmacht in June and July 1944. It lasted from 5 July to 13 July 1944 and ended with a Soviet victory.

During the offensive, Soviet forces encircled and captured the city of Vilnius; this phase is sometimes referred to as the Battle of Vilnius. However, 3,000 German soldiers of the encircled garrison managed to break out with their commander, Reiner Stahel.

== Prelude ==
During the interwar, the Vilnius Region was disputed between the Second Polish Republic and Lithuania. During the invasion of Poland, the city was seized by the Soviet Union and later transferred to Lithuania under the terms of the Soviet–Lithuanian Mutual Assistance Treaty. It was captured by the Germans in June 1941.

From 23 June 1944, the Red Army conducted a strategic offensive operation under the code-name Operation Bagration, expelling the Wehrmacht's Army Group Centre from Belarus, and driving towards the Polish border and the Baltic Sea coast.

By the beginning of July, the front line had been torn open at the seam of German Army Group Centre and Army Group North, roughly on a line from Vitebsk to Vilnius. While a large part of the Soviet force was employed to reduce the German pocket east of Minsk, following the Minsk offensive, Stavka, the Soviet High Command decided to exploit the situation along the breach to the north, by turning mobile formations towards the major traffic centre of Vilnius, in eastern Lithuania. For Oberkommando der Wehrmacht, the German High Command, it became imperative to hold Vilnius, because without it would become almost impossible to re-establish a sustainable connection between the two German army groups, and to hold the Red Army off outside East Prussia and away from the Baltic Sea shores.

Stavka issued Order No. 220126 to the 3rd Belorussian Front on 4 July, which required them to attack towards Maladzyechna and Vilnius, capturing the latter no later than 10 July, and to force crossings of the Neman. The 33rd Army was transferred from the 2nd Belorussian Front to assist these objectives.

The German forces were still in comparative disarray after the Minsk offensive. Remnants of the 4th Army that had escaped the encirclement, and units of the 5th Panzer Division (reorganised into an ad hoc Kampfgruppe, later redesignated XXXIX Panzer Corps, under General Dietrich von Saucken) retreated to form a defence before Maladzyechna, an important rail junction; but the 5th Guards Tank Army cut the route between there and Minsk on 3 July.

== Deployments ==
=== Wehrmacht ===
- Southern flank of 3rd Panzer Army (Colonel-General Georg-Hans Reinhardt)
  - XXVI Corps (General Gerhard Matzky)
  - Garrison of Vilnius (Major-General Rainer Stahel)
- Remnants of Fourth Army (General Kurt von Tippelskirch)
  - XXXIX Panzer Corps (General Dietrich von Saucken)
  - Sperrgruppe Weidling
  - 340th Volksgrenadier Division Theodor Tolsdorff

=== Red Army ===
- 3rd Belorussian Front (General Ivan Chernyakhovsky)
  - 11th Guards Army (General Kuzma Galitsky)
  - 5th Army
  - 33rd Army (Lieutenant-General Vasily Kryuchenkin)
  - 39th Army
  - 31st Army
  - 5th Guards Tank Army (General Pavel Rotmistrov)
  - 1st Air Army

== The offensive ==
Chernyakhovsky ordered his main mobile 'exploitation' forces, the 5th Guards Tank Army and 3rd Guards Cavalry Corps to continue their advance from Minsk on 5 July towards Vilnius, to reach the city by the following day: they were to encircle Vilnius from the south and north respectively. The 5th Army's rifle divisions were ordered to follow and close up to them. To the south, the 39th Army was directed to move on Lida, while the 11th Guards Army would advance in the Front's centre.

Soviet reports suggested that units on their northern flank advanced according to the schedule, noting some resistance from scattered remnants of the destroyed VI Corps of Third Panzer Army, but stated that the 11th Guards Army in particular encountered strong German resistance and several counter-attacks. However, the 5th Panzer Division was unable to hold Maladzyechna. The Soviet 5th Army advanced to Vilnius' outskirts by 8 July, while the 5th Guards Tank Army encircled the city from the south, trapping the garrison.

Lida, another rail junction, was taken by the 3rd Guards Cavalry Corps on the evening of 8 July, after the German defenders (largely from the notorious SS units of Gruppe von Gottberg and the Kaminski Brigade) abandoned their positions in old World War I trenches, despite reinforcement from Weidling's units. The latter gave up their attempt to hold the city on 9 July.

== The battle for Vilnius ==
Universal Newsreel about the battle

During the battle for the city itself, the Soviet 5th Army and 5th Guards Tank Army engaged the German garrison (German: Fester Platz Wilna), consisting of Grenadier-Regiment 399 and Artillery Regiment 240 of the 170th Infantry Division, Grenadier-Regiment 1067, a battalion from the 16th Parachute Regiment, the anti-tank battalion of the 256th Infantry Division and other units) under the command of Luftwaffe Major-General Reiner Stahel.

The Soviet 35th Guards Tank Brigade initially took the airport, defended by the battalion of paratroopers; intense street-by-street fighting then commenced as the Soviets attempted to reduce the defence.^{[a]}

=== The breakout attempt ===
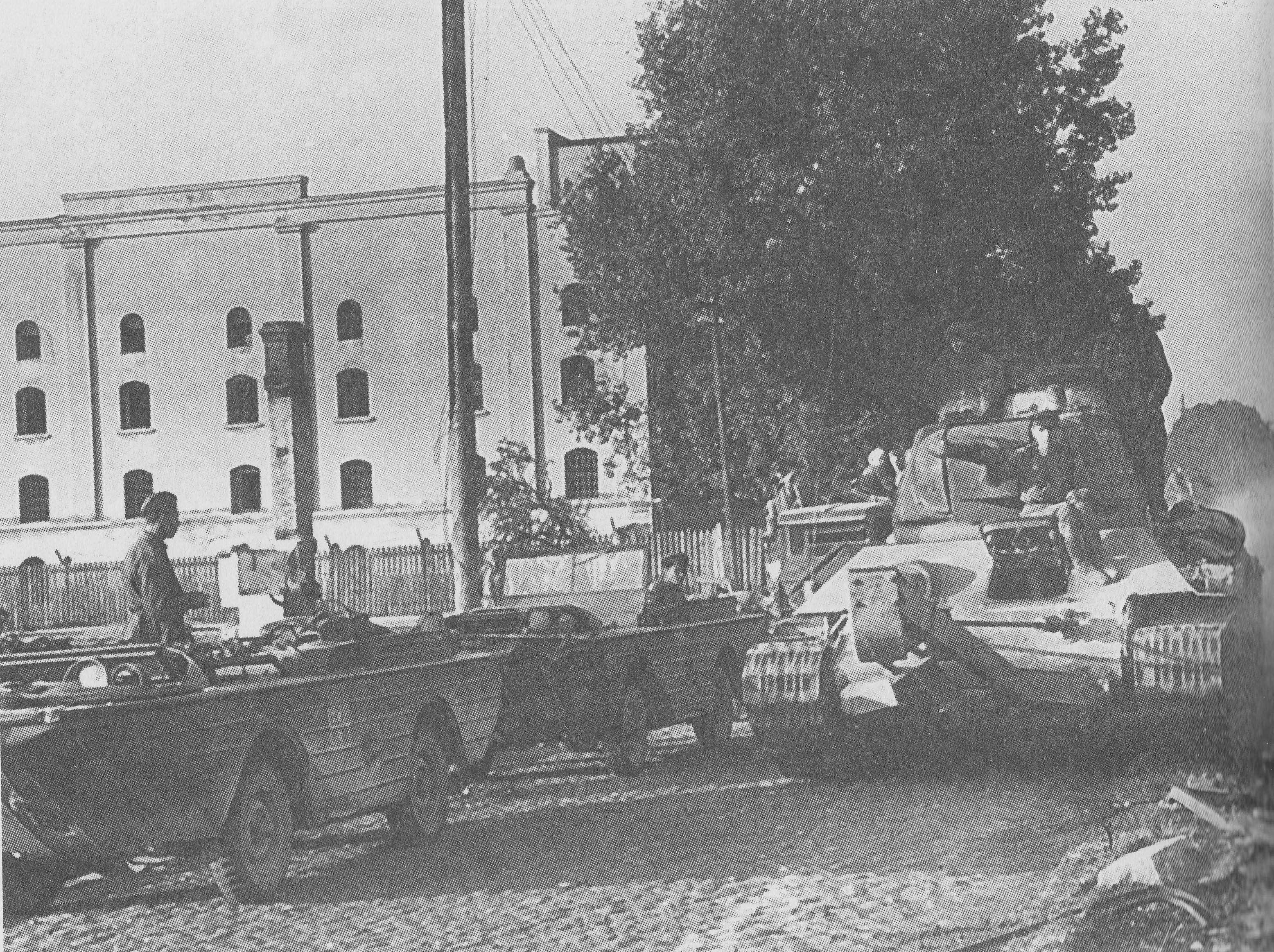
Soviet Ford GPAs and a T-34 tank on a street in Vilnius after the battle

On 12 July, the garrison's parent formation, 3rd Panzer Army, counter-attacked. 6th Panzer Division, organised into two groups ("Pössl" and "Stahl") attacked eastwards from outside the encirclement (the divisional commander and Colonel-General Reinhardt personally accompanied the advance group). The opposing Soviet forces, taken by surprise and hampered by extended supply lines, were unable to hold the cordon, and 6th Panzer's forces were able to advance some 50 km to link up with forward elements from the Vilnius garrison. A fierce battle on the banks of the Neris ensued as men of the Polish Home Army unsuccessfully attempted to stop the relief troops.

In the city itself, a Soviet attack on the morning of 13 July split the German forces into two pockets centred on the prison and the observatory; around 3,000 Germans escaped through the corridor opened by the 6th Panzer Division before Soviet forces closed the gap. Even so, 12,000–13,000 German troops were lost in the city, which was finally captured towards the evening of 13 July.

The battle was marked by an uprising under the code-name Operation Ostra Brama by the Polish Home Army, in expectation of the arrival of the Red Army, as part of Operation Tempest. Despite the Soviet forces' success, Rotmistrov's committing a tank corps to costly urban fighting (along with earlier disagreements with his Front commander, Ivan Chernyakhovsky) led to his replacement as commander of the 5th Guards Tank Army.

== Outcome ==
While the German aim of holding Vilnius as a Fester Platz or fortress was not achieved, the tenacious defence contributed to stopping the Red Army's drive west for a few precious days. Most importantly, it tied down the 5th Guards Tank Army, which had been instrumental in the initial successes of the Red Army during Operation Bagration. This delay gave German forces a chance to re-establish something resembling a continuous defence line further to the west. Hitler recognised this achievement by awarding Stahel the 79th set of Swords to the Knight's Cross of the Iron Cross awarded during the war. Nevertheless, the outcome fell far short of what the German command had hoped for, and the continuous frontline that was established only held for a short time. Without the traffic network based on Vilnius, the German position in the southern Baltics was untenable. By the end of July, the 3rd Belorussian Front was ordered to conduct the Kaunas offensive to extend the gains of Operation Bagration further.

== See also ==
- Operation Bagration, the strategic offensive of which this action was a part
- Roza Shanina, Soviet sniper who fought in the battle for Vilnius
- Theodor Tolsdorff, German officer decorated for his role in the battle

== Notes ==
a. Official Soviet accounts, and later accounts based on them, speak of many German troops being parachuted into the city several days into the siege before being wiped out as they landed. German orders of battle do not show such troops. The accounts may be, in fact, referring to the small number of troops from the 16th Parachute Regiment participating in the defence; other elements of the same unit were present in the relief force.
