= Werner Ehrig =

German general (1897–1981)

- Born: 22 April 1897
- Died: 31 January 1981 (aged 83)
- Military career
- Allegiance: Nazi Germany
- Branch: Army (Wehrmacht)
- Rank: Generalleutnant
- Commands: 340. Infanterie-Division; 544. Grenadier-Division; 544. Volksgrenadier-Division
- Conflicts: World War II
- Awards: Knight's Cross of the Iron Cross

Werner Julius Clemens Ehrig (22 April 1897 – 31 January 1981) was a German general in the Wehrmacht during World War II. He was a recipient of the Knight's Cross of the Iron Cross of Nazi Germany.

== Awards and decorations ==
- Knight's Cross of the Iron Cross on 26 May 1940 as Oberstleutnant and Chief of Operations in the General Staff of 22. Infanterie-Division

Military offices
Preceded by Generalleutnant Josef Prinner	Commander of 340. Infanterie-Division; 25 October 1943 – 16 June 1944	Succeeded by Generalmajor Otto Beutler
Preceded by None	Commander of 544. Grenadier-Division; 10 July 1944 – 9 October 1944	Succeeded by Renamed 544. Volksgrenadier-Division
Preceded by Previously 544. Grenadier-Division	Commander of 544. Volksgrenadier-Division; 9 October 1944 – 8 May 1945	Succeeded by None
