= Close Combat Badge =

Close Combat Badge may refer to:

- Close Combat Clasp, a World War II German military award for participation in hand-to-hand fighting at close quarters
- Combat Action Badge, a United States military award given to soldiers of the U.S. Army of any rank and who are not members of an infantry, special forces, or medical MOS
