= Josef Prinner =

- Born: 18 December 1894
- Died: 1 July 1966 (aged 71)
- Military career
- Allegiance: Nazi Germany
- Branch: Army (Wehrmacht)
- Rank: Generalleutnant
- Commands: 340th Infantry Division; 311th Artillery Division
- Conflicts: World War II
- Awards: Knight's Cross of the Iron Cross

Josef Prinner (18 December 1894 – 1 July 1966) was a German general in the Wehrmacht during World War II. He was also a recipient of the Knight's Cross of the Iron Cross of Nazi Germany.

== Awards and decorations ==
- Knight's Cross of the Iron Cross on 11 January 1945 as Generalleutnant and commander of Höherer Artilleriekommandeur 311

Military offices
Preceded by Generalleutnant Otto Butze	Commander of 340. Infanterie-Division; 24 February 1943 – 25 October 1943	Succeeded by Generalleutnant Werner Ehrig
Preceded by None	Commander of 311. Artillerie-Division; 1 December 1943 – 28 July 1944	Succeeded by Generalleutnant Karl Burdach
Preceded by Generalleutnant Karl Burdach	Commander of Höherer Artillerie-Kommandeur 311 (HArko 311); 15 November 1944 – 8 May 1945	Succeeded by None
