= Ground Assault Badge of the Luftwaffe =

World War II German military decoration

Ground Assault Badge of the Luftwaffe Erdkampfabzeichen der Luftwaffe
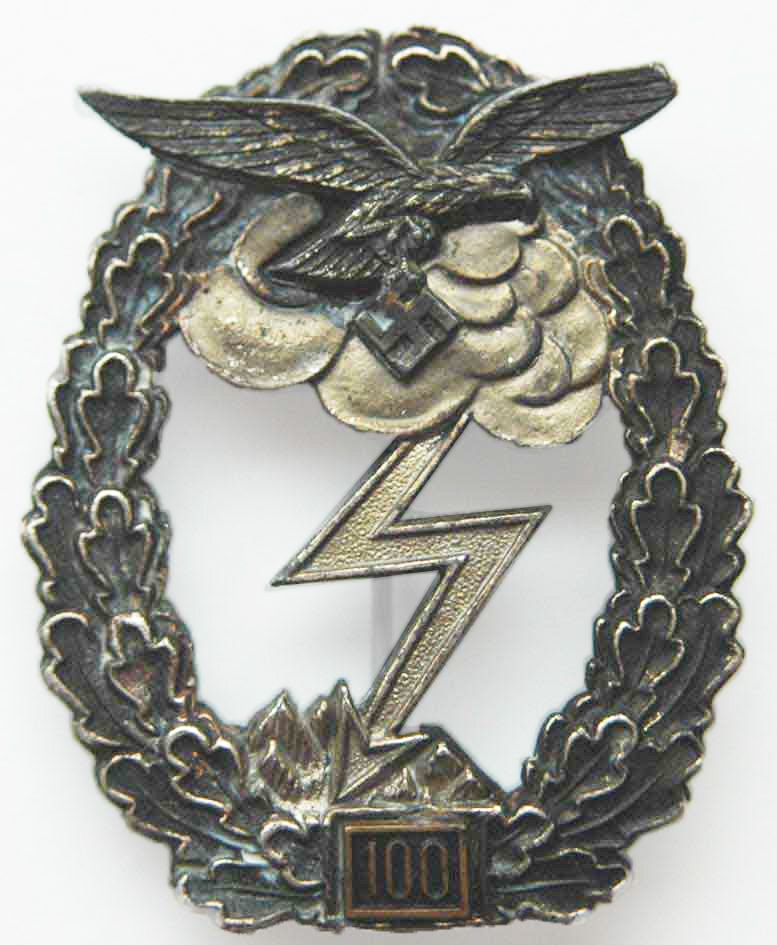
- 5th grade of the Ground Assault Badge (awarded for participation in 100 combat operations)
- Type: Badge
- Awarded for: Participation in three separate combat operations on separate days by Luftwaffe personnel
- Presented by: Nazi Germany
- Eligibility: Military personnel of the Luftwaffe
- Campaign: World War II
- Status: Obsolete
- Established: 31 March 1942; 26 July 1957 (Denazified, swastika-removed version re-established for wear among WWII veterans properly awarded the badge and serving in the Bundeswehr)
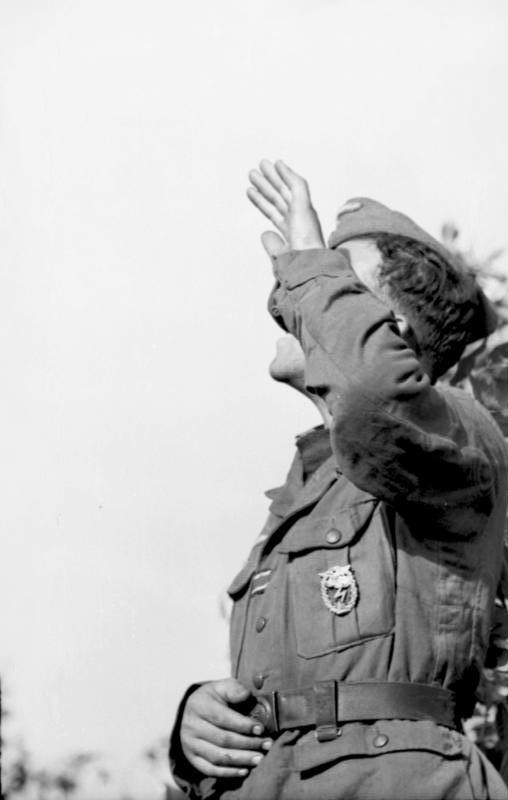
- Soldier wearing the Ground Assault Badge of the Luftwaffe on the left side of the uniform.
- Related: Infantry Assault Badge; General Assault Badge; Close Combat Clasp

The Ground Assault Badge of the Luftwaffe (German: Erdkampfabzeichen der Luftwaffe) was a World War II German military decoration awarded to Luftwaffe personnel for achievement in ground combat. It was instituted on 31 March 1942 by the commander-in-chief (Oberbefehlshaber der Luftwaffe) Hermann Göring.

The badge, designed by the graphic and textile artist Sigmund von Weech (1888–1982), features an oak leaf wreath with at its apex a Luftwaffe eagle, grasping a swastika, flying above a storm cloud, from which a centered positioned lightning bolt strikes trough ground. The general criteria for its presentation was the participation in three separate combat operations on separate days. Luftwaffe soldiers who had already been awarded combat recognition badges of the Heer (German Army), such as the General Assault Badge or the Infantry Assault Badge, were required to exchange their badges for the Ground Assault Badge of the Luftwaffe.

As the war progressed it became necessary to further distinguish those soldiers who had already exceeded the awarding criteria. To accomplish this distinction, Göring instituted four numbered grades on 10 November 1944 based on the number of combat operations. The new badge was changed at its base to incorporate the operations number marking each new grade.

- 2nd grade (II. Stufe) for 25 eligible operations
- 3rd grade (III. Stufe) for 50 eligible operations
- 4th grade (IV. Stufe) for 75 eligible operations
- 5th grade (V. Stufe) for 100 eligible operations

== Versions ==
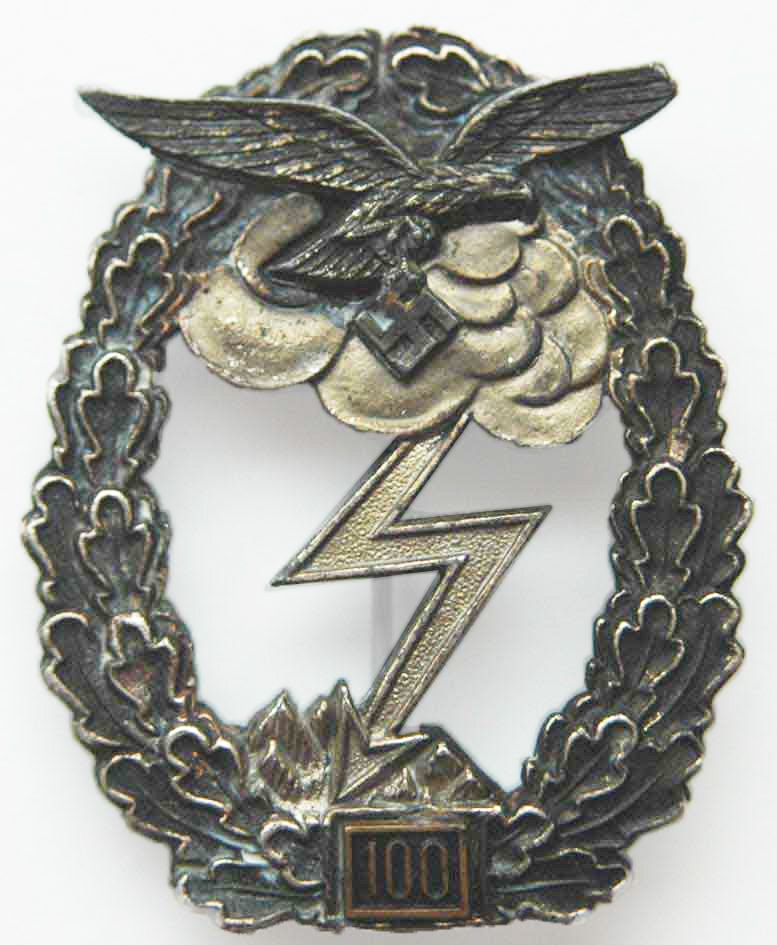
5th grade

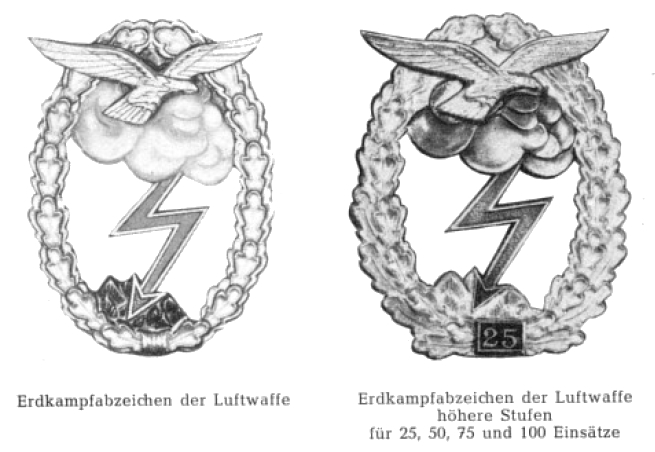
1957 de-nazified version
