= Ordensgesetz =

Federal law of Germany

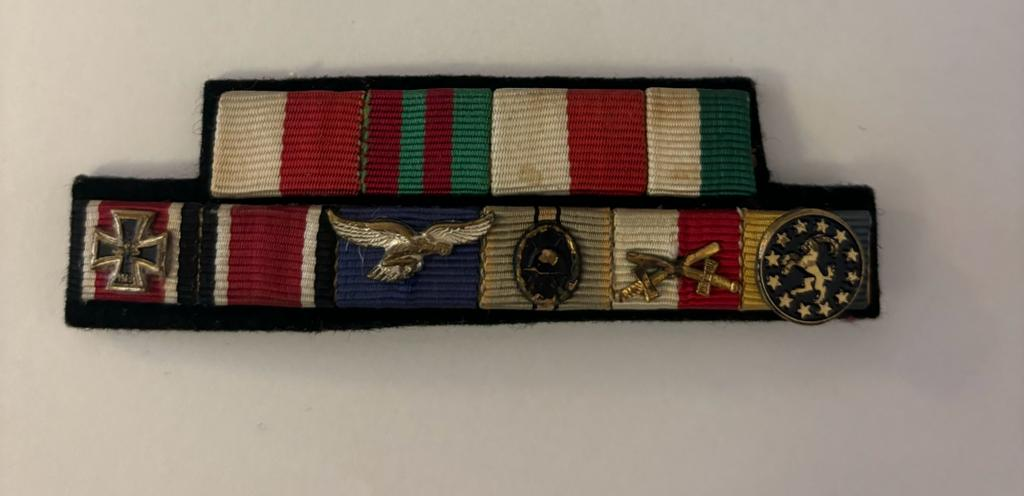
German Air Force soldier's ribbon bar, 1957

The Gesetz über Titel, Orden und Ehrenzeichen ("Law of Titles, Orders and Honours"), often shortened to Ordensgesetz ("Orders Law"), is a federal law of Germany detailing the treatment and handling procedures for civilian and military decorations. The law was enacted on July 26, 1957, and served two primary purposes. First, it stipulated how medals and military decorations from before 1945 should be handled (including those from the days of the Weimar Republic, which had been influenced by laws in 1933 and 1937 under the government of Nazi Germany). Second, it was intended to describe treatment and procedures for medals in the (then newly created) Federal Republic of Germany.

== Basic Conventions ==
In general, the German law elucidates the following conventions:

- Both the Federal government as well as the States can confer Titles, Orders and Honours (referred to here simply as Orders)
- The Federal President can personally establish Orders or quasi-officially recognize existing Honours (for example, in the area of sport).
- Convicted criminals will, as a rule, have Orders and Honours revoked.
- Germans may accept foreign Orders only after presidential approval.
- Awards may only be borne personally by the honoured person; the decorations remain, however, as a rule, in the property of the heirs upon death.
- Unauthorized bearing of domestic and foreign Orders and Honours as well as the bearing of Awards with National Socialistic emblems can be considered a breach of civil law and be subject to a fine.

The original law also committed the German federal government to pay Ehrensold (literally "honorary soldier's pay", a type of pension or honorarium) included in certain awards from World War I and before. The last person to receive an Ehrensold was Ernst Jünger, the last living holder of the military class of the Pour le Mérite until he died in 1998. On February 19, 2006, this portion of the law was nullified.

== Previously Conferred Medals ==
The law outlines numerous stipulations and regulations governing previously conferred medals and military decorations. In practice, the law conforms to German criminal code, particularly § 86a, which forbids the distribution or public display of Nazi symbolism without historical or academic cause.

Awards from before the Nazis' rise to power in 1933 may be worn so long as they are only worn in their original form. Along with other circumstantial stipulations, medals from 1933 to 1945 may only be worn if National Socialist symbols are removed (e.g., swastikas, SS runes). Medals awarded to members of civil services (e.g., fire departments or search-and-rescue crews) have no further limitations. Military commendations conferred by a previously allied state may be worn only with the express consent of the state that awarded them, regardless of when they were awarded.

Medals specifically permitted for display by the law include:

- The Iron Cross (and its varying grades)
- The Silesian Eagle (an award from the Weimar Republic for the Freikorps)
- The Baltenkreuz (an award from the Weimar Republic for combat in the Baltic states)
- The Wound Badge
- The Luftschutzabzeichen (Air defense badge)
- The Panzer Badge
- The Infantry Assault Badge
- The Close Combat Clasp
- The General Assault Badge

Section 6, paragraph 2 specifically reiterates that medals with National Socialist emblems may not be worn. They may not be produced, offered, inventoried, sold, or used in commerce in any form. Accompanying the law, the German Ministry of the Interior released a supplement depicting the altered forms of awards from the period covered by 1934 to 1945.

== Order of precedence ==
Section 12 of the law enumerates the order of precedence for medals worn by soldiers. Medals are worn on the left upper breast with the following precedence from right to left:

1. Verdienstorden der Bundesrepublik Deutschland (Order of Merit of the Federal Republic of Germany)
2. Rettungsmedaille am Bande (Lifesaving Medal; originally a Prussian award for saving the life of another soldier)
3. Eisernes Kreuz 1914 (Iron Cross awarded during the First World War)
4. Eisernes Kreuz 1939 (Iron Cross awarded during the Second World War)
5. Other medals awarded for service in the First World War in the order of their conferment
6. Ehrenkreuz für Frontkämpfer und Kriegsteilnehmer (Cross of Honour for Combatants and Participants in World War 1914-1918) established in 1934, awarded to surviving combatants and participants, as well as the bereaved parents and widows of fallen combatants/participants
7. Kriegsverdienstkreuz 1939 (War Merit Cross, a WW2 non-combat medal equivalent to the non-combat version of the pre-WW2 Iron Cross)
8. Other medals awarded for service in the Second World War in the order of their conferment
9. Further German awards in the order of their conferment
10. Officially authorized awards in the order of their conferment
11. Foreign awards in the order of their respective precedence

== See also ==
- Orders, decorations, and medals of Nazi Germany
- Strafgesetzbuch § 86a
