= Eastern Medal =

German campaign medal

Winter Battle in the East 1941–42 Medal Medaille Winterschlacht im Osten 1941/42 (German)
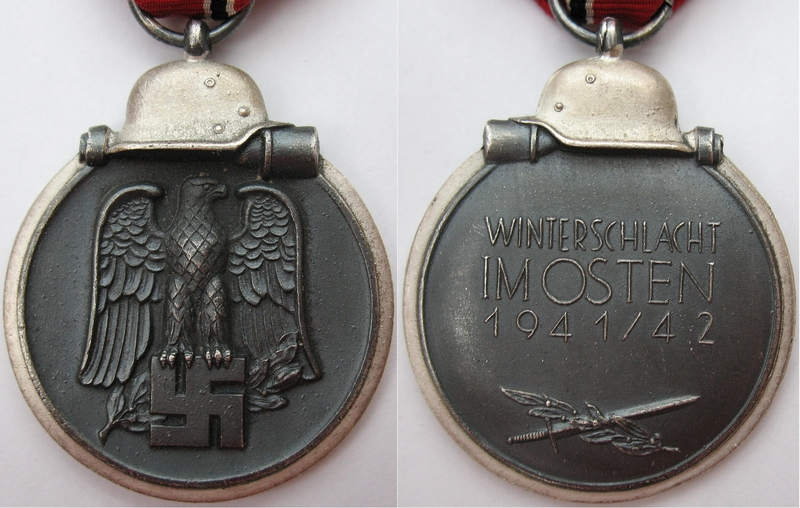
- Obverse and reverse of the medal
- Type: Campaign medal
- Awarded for: Service in the Soviet Union from 15 November 1941 to 15 April 1942
- Country: Germany
- Presented by: the Führer and Supreme Commander of the Wehrmacht
- Eligibility: Wehrmacht and Waffen-SS personnel
- Campaign: World War II – Russian Winter
- Established: 26 May 1942
- Final award: 4 September 1944

Highlights
- Total: Over 3 million
- Ribbon bar

Precedence
- Next (higher): War Merit Cross

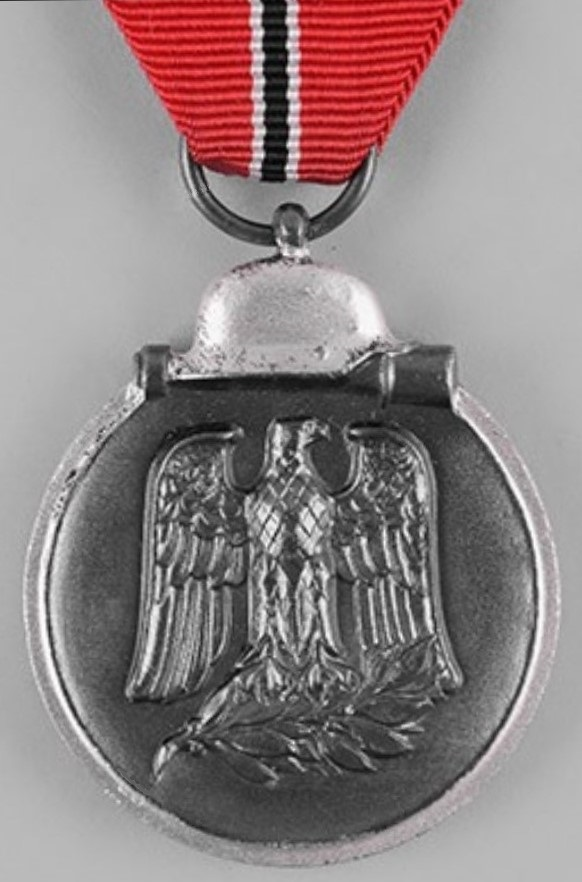
Post war version without swastika

The Eastern Medal (German: Ostmedaille), officially the Winter Battle in the East 1941–42 Medal (German: Medaille Winterschlacht im Osten 1941/42), was a military award of the Wehrmacht which was created by ordinance of Adolf Hitler on 26 May 1942.

The Eastern Medal was awarded to any member of the Wehrmacht or Waffen-SS who served on the German Eastern Front during the winter campaign, within the period from 15 November 1941 to 15 April 1942. It was also awarded posthumously to any service member who died in the line of duty within the Soviet Union. It was called the Frozen Meat Medal or the "Order of the Frozen Flesh" (German: Gefrierfleischorden). Due to its appearance there was the rhyme "Black as the frozen fingers, white as the snow all around the red army" German: Schwarz wie die Finger, weiß wie der Schnee und rundherum die Rote Armee.)

== Criteria ==
Wehrmacht personnel qualified for the Eastern Medal after a minimum of 14 days in active combat; 30 air combat sorties; 60 days continuous of service in a combat zone; being wounded or suffering a "frozen limb", severe enough to warrant the issue of a Wound Badge, and it could be awarded posthumously.

On 20 January 1943, official qualification for the Eastern Medal was extended to include both male and female combatant and non-combatant personnel in the Wehrmacht. Also, foreign members of Wehrmacht units; personnel killed or missing in action and civilians working under Wehrmacht control, including those involved in construction and road building. Geographic limits were placed on the award of east of Ukraine and Ostland or in the Finland area, east of the original 1940 Russo/Finnish border. The Eastern Medal was officially decommissioned by the Oberkommando der Wehrmacht (German: High Command of the Armed Forces) (OKW) on 4 September 1944.

== Appearance ==
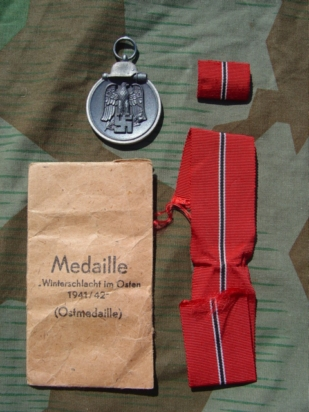
Issue packet

The Eastern Medal was designed by SS-Unterscharführer Ernst Krause. Measuring 3.6 cm (1.4 in) in diameter, of (generally) zinc construction, the medal was given a gun-metal coloured coating. The concave obverse side features a national socialist eagle grasping a swastika with laurel behind. The reverse features the text in capital letters: "WINTERSCHLACHT IM OSTEN 1941/42" ("Winter Battle in the East 1941–42") featuring a crossed sword and branch below the text. A helmet and stick grenade below the medal loop as well as outer ring were finished in a polished silver effect. The medal measures approximately 44mm by 36mm.

The Service ribbon featured a central white-black-white (white for snow, black for the fallen soldiers) stripe with red (for blood) either side. The medal and ribbon were presented in a paper packet with the name of the medal on the front and the maker name on the reverse. Like the Iron Cross 2nd Class (EK II) 1939–45, the Eastern Medal's ribbon was worn either from the second buttonhole of the uniform tunic or on a ribbon bar. Where the two ribbons were worn together in the buttonhole, the EK II appeared in front of the Eastern Medal. Over three million medals were issued and many more manufactured.

While wear of Nazi era awards was initially banned in 1945, the Eastern Medal was among those re-authorised for wear by the Federal Republic of Germany in 1957. With Nazi symbols now forbidden, the award was re-designed by removing the swastika, the eagle on the obverse now standing solely on a laurel branch.
