= Close Combat Clasp =

World War II German military award

Close Combat Clasp Nahkampfspange
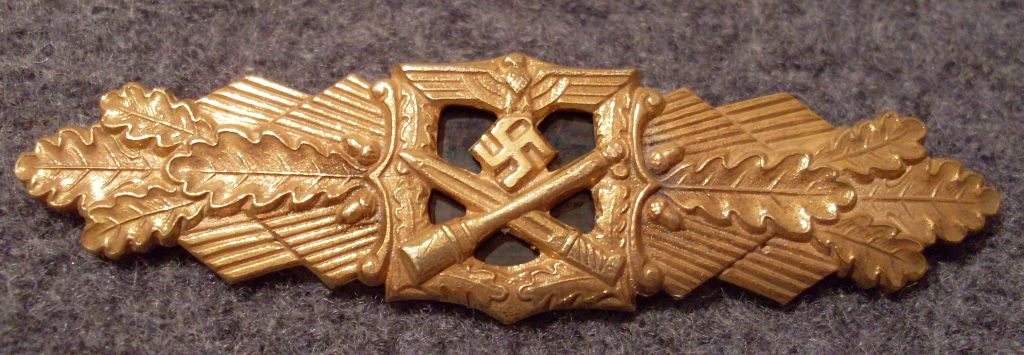
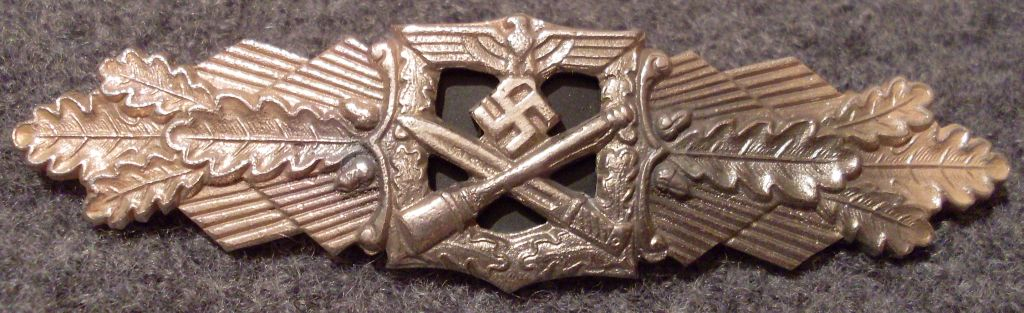
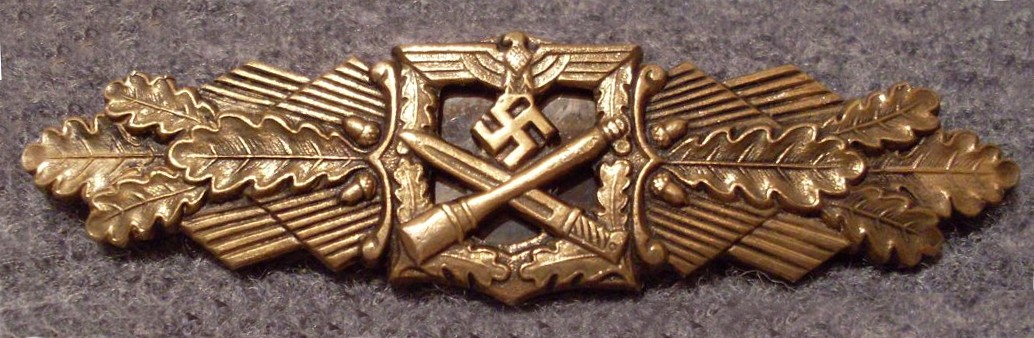
- Close Combat Clasp in Gold, Silver, and Bronze
- Type: Clasp
- Awarded for: Hand-to-hand fighting
- Presented by: Nazi Germany
- Eligibility: Wehrmacht and Waffen-SS personnel
- Campaign: World War II
- Status: Obsolete
- Established: 25 November 1942; 26 July 1957 (Denazified, Reichsadler- and swastika-removed version re-established for wear among World War II veterans properly awarded the badge)

Highlights
- Total: 36,400 in bronze; 9,500 in silver; 631 in gold
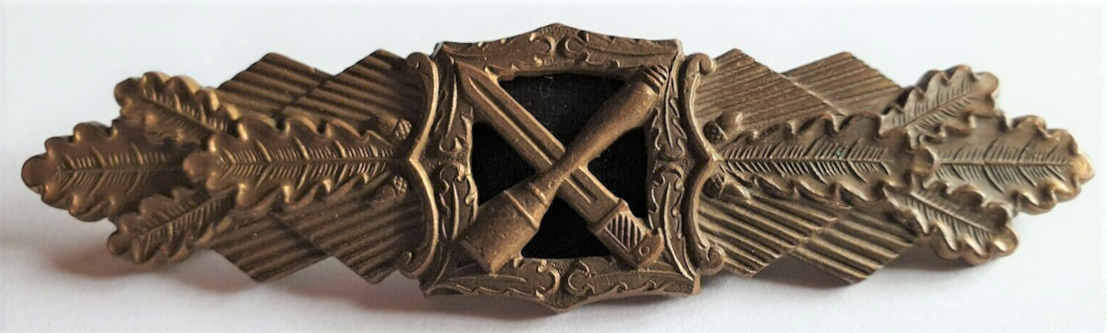
- Post-1957 version sans Reichsadler and swastika
- Related: Infantry Assault Badge; General Assault Badge; Ground Assault Badge of the Luftwaffe

The Close Combat Clasp (German: Nahkampfspange) was a World War II German military award instituted on 25 November 1942 for participation in hand-to-hand fighting. It was intended primarily for infantry, but other Heer, Waffen-SS, Luftwaffe ground units and Fallschirmjäger (Paratroopers) were also eligible.

== Eligibility ==
The award was bestowed in three classes:

- Bronze for 15 close combat actions;
- Silver for 25 close combat actions;
- Gold for 50 close combat actions.

Close combat actions were counted from 1 December 1942, with earlier long service on the Eastern Front counting towards the award: 15 continuous months counted as 15 combat days, 12 months as 10 days, and 8 months as 5 days.

For those who had received disabling wounds, there was discretion to make the award after 10, 20, and 40 actions.

As the war continued, several amendments were made to the award criteria:

- From 4 August 1944, only front-line actions could count towards the clasp, with rear actions against partisans reflected in the award of the Bandit-warfare Badge.
- From 30 August 1944, recipients of the gold clasp were normally also awarded the German Cross in gold; with silver clasp recipients receiving the Iron Cross first class, both without the need for further justification.
- From 8 October 1944, those awarded the gold clasp also received 21 days' special leave.

The German infantry often regarded the Gold Close Combat Clasp in higher esteem than the Knight's Cross of the Iron Cross, and Adolf Hitler reserved the right to bestow this class personally. Of the roughly 18–20 million soldiers of the German Wehrmacht and Waffen-SS, 36,400 received the Bronze Class, 9,500 the Silver Class, and 631 the Gold Class.

== Design and wear ==
The clasp was worn above the upper left uniform pocket, above any medal ribbon bar. Only one badge, the highest level received, was worn. It was die-cast and made of either tombac or later zinc. The design of all three classes was the same, with a centerpiece consisting of the eagle and swastika national emblem surmounting a crossed bayonet and hand grenade with, on each side, a spray of oakleaves, interspersed with a sunburst ray effect. The clasp was slightly curved and measured 9.7 cm by 2.6 cm.

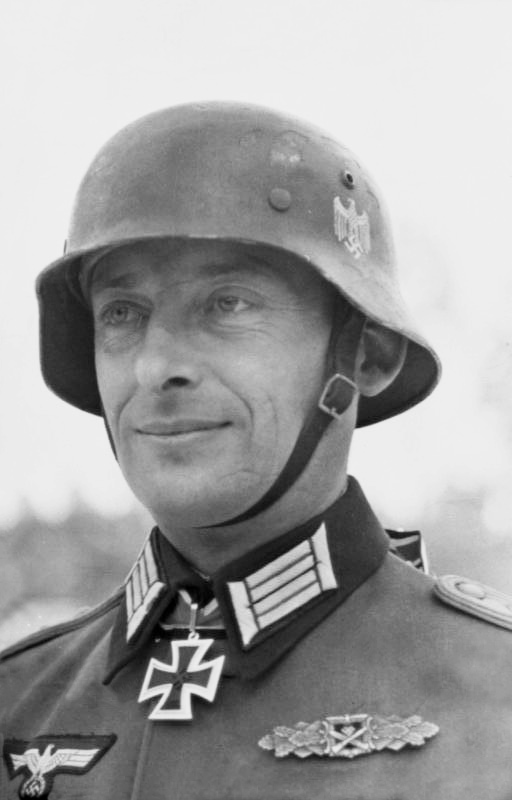
Wartime Wehrmacht officer wearing the Close Combat Clasp and Knight's Cross

Nazi-era awards were initially banned by the post-war Federal Republic of Germany. In 1957, many World War II military decorations, including the Close Combat Clasp, were redesigned to remove the eagle and swastika, and then re-authorised for wear by qualifying veterans. Members of the Bundeswehr would wear the badge on the ribbon bar, represented by a small replica of the award on a field grey ribbon.

Awards in gold were frequently presented by Adolf Hitler personally or by another high-ranking Nazi official, such as Heinrich Himmler.

== Luftwaffe version ==
Luftwaffe ground troops and paratroopers had been eligible for the Close Combat Clasp from its creation. In November 1944, a Luftwaffe version was approved, applying the same award criteria and three classes as the existing clasp. The badge comprised a laurel wreath set behind a Luftwaffe eagle and swastika surmounting a crossed bayonet and hand grenade, all in silver. This was flanked by two sprays of oak leaves, in bronze, silver, or gold to denote the appropriate class. While awards of the new clasp were authorised, and award certificates issued, there is no evidence that it was actually manufactured and presented before the end of the war.

The Luftwaffe Close Combat Clasp was among the decorations re-authorised for wear by the Federal Republic of Germany in 1957, the modified design omitting the swastika, but retaining the Luftwaffe eagle emblem.

== Notable Recipients ==
- Hermann Fegelein, who was Himmler's SS liaison officer at Führer Headquarters and was married to Gretl Braun, sister of Hitler's mistress, Eva Braun, received the clasp in silver for actions on the Eastern Front. Executed for desertion in the final days of Nazi Germany.
- Oskar Dirlewanger, commander of the Dirlewanger Brigade, a notorious Waffen-SS penal unit known for its war crimes committed on the Eastern Front.

== Fictional Portrayals ==
- In the 1968 film Where Eagles Dare, Gestapo Major Von Hapen (Derren Nesbitt) wears the clasp in gold. (How a Gestapo officer would have qualified for such a rare combat decoration is unexplained.)
- In the 1976 film The Eagle Has Landed, Colonel Max Radl (Robert Duvall) wears the clasp in silver.
- James Coburn's character, Sgt. Rolf Steiner wears a gold clasp in the 1977 Sam Peckinpah film, Cross of Iron. In the 1979 sequel Breakthrough, Steiner is played by Richard Burton, who likewise wears the clasp in gold.

== Sources ==
- Berger, Florian (2004). Ritterkreuzträger mit Nahkampfspange in Gold (in German). Vienna: Berger. ISBN 3-9501307-3-X.
- Durante, Thomas M. (2019). The German Close Combat Clasp of World War II - 2nd Edition. ISBN 978-0-9600753-0-0.
- Durante, Thomas M. (2007). The German Close Combat Clasp of World War II. ISBN 978-90-812301-1-7.
- "Bundesministerium der Justiz: Gesetz über Titel, Orden und Ehrenzeichen, 26.7.1957. Bundesgesetzblatt Teil III, Gliederungsnummer 1132-1" [Law on Titles, Orders and Decorations Part III, Section No. 1132-1]. Bundesgesetzblatt [Federal Law Gazette] (in German). Federal Ministry of Justice. July 26, 1957.
- Dienstvorschriften Nr. 14/97. Bezug: Anzugordnung für die Soldaten der Bundeswehr. ZDv 37/10. (Juli 1996) (in German). German Federal regulation.
- Klietmann, Kurt-Gerhard (1981). Auszeichnungen des Deutschen Reiches. 1936–1945 [Awards of the German Reich, 1936-1945] (in German) (11th ed.). Motorbuch, Stuttgart. ISBN 3-87943-689-4.
- Littlejohn, David; Dodkins, Colonel C. M. (1968). Orders, Decorations, Medals and Badges of the Third Reich. California: R. James Bender Publishing. ISBN 978-0854200801.
- Williamson, Gordon (2002). World War II German Battle Insignia. Osprey Publishing. ISBN 1841763527.
