= 340th Volksgrenadier Division =

340th Infantry Division 340th Volksgrenadier Division
- 340. Infanterie-Division; 340. Volksgrenadier-Division
- Active: 1940–1944; 1944–1945
- Country: Nazi Germany
- Branch: Heer (Wehrmacht)

Commanders
- Notable commanders: Friedrich-Wilhelm Neumann; Josef Prinner; Werner Ehrig; Theodor Tolsdorff

The 340th Volksgrenadier Division was a volksgrenadier division of the German Army during the Second World War, active from 1944 to 1945.

The division was formed in September 1944, replacing the destroyed 340th Infantry Division, by redesignating the 572. Volksgrenadier-Division, under the command of Theodor Tolsdorff. It contained the 694th, 695th and 696th Grenadier Regiments, and the 340th Artillery Regiment.

== 340th Infantry Division ==
The 340th Infantry Division was formed on 16 November 1940 in the Wehrkreis X (Schleswig) from elements of the 68th, 170th and 290th Infantry-Divisions, as part of the 14. Welle (14th wave of mobilization).

After her training in the area of Hamburg, she was sent in June 1941 to the north of France in the region of Calais as a force for occupation and coastal defense.

In June 1942 she was transferred to the Eastern Front. She fought near Voronezh (August 1942–January 1943) and Kursk (July 1943) and suffered heavy losses in the Kiev area in the autumn of 1943.

She was reinforced by the addition of Divisions-Gruppe 327 in November 1943.

The division was destroyed by Soviet forces in the Brody Pocket in July 1944 and was dissolved on 13 August 1944.

== 340th Volksgrenadier Division ==
The surviving elements formed from 15 September 1944 the 340. Volks-Grenadier-Division. The division fought in the Battle of the Bulge, as part of I SS Panzer Corps, and then retreated into Germany as part of XIII SS Corps before finally being destroyed in the Ruhr pocket in April 1945.
