= Infantry Assault Badge =

Nazi German military award

Infantry Assault Badge Infanterie-Sturmabzeichen
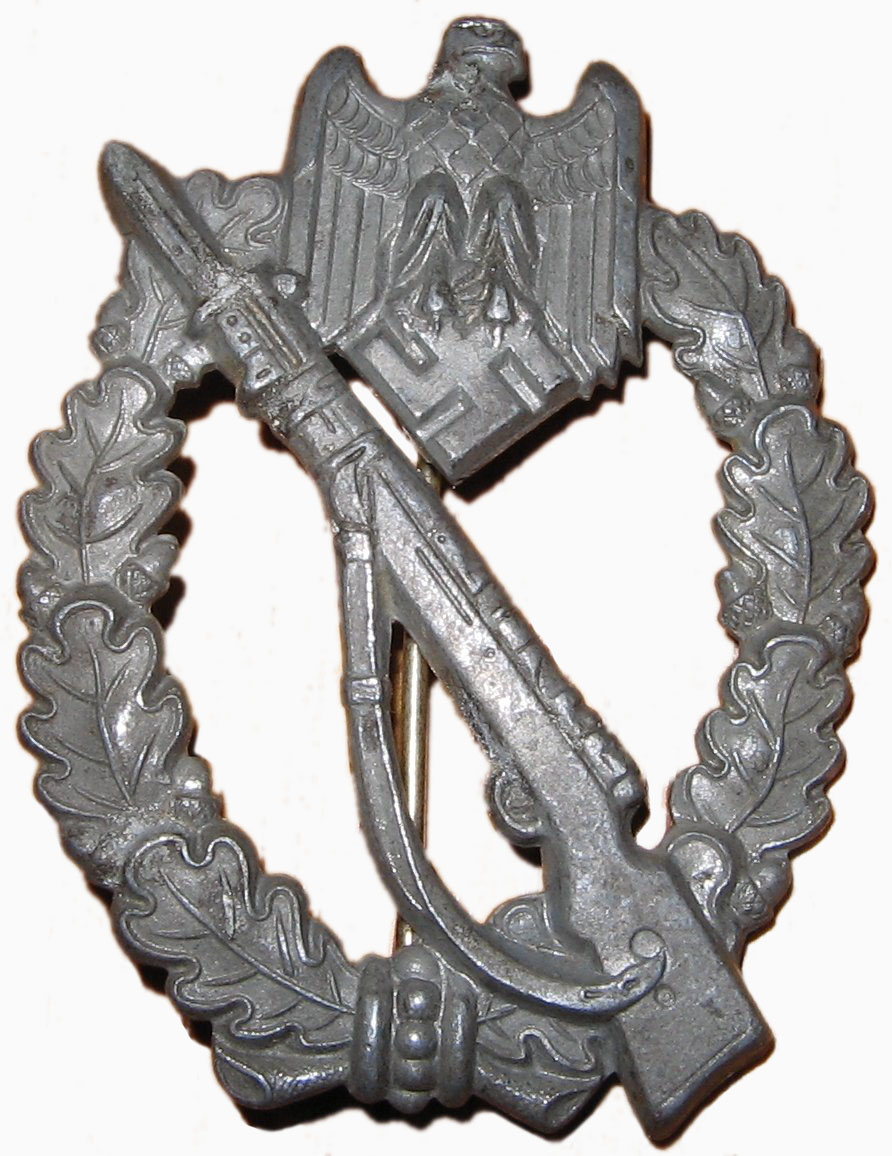
- Infantry Assault Badge in Silver.
- Type: Badge
- Awarded for: Silver grade: Awarded to infantry and Gebirgsjäger personnel engaged in ground combat for a specified period of time; Bronze grade: Awarded to motorized and mechanized infantry personnel engaged in ground combat for a specified period of time
- Presented by: Nazi Germany
- Eligibility: Wehrmacht and Waffen-SS personnel assigned to infantry or Gebirgsjäger units; Motorized or mechanized infantry units became eligible with the introduction of the bronze grade
- Campaign: World War II
- Status: Obsolete
- Established: 20 December 1939 (Silver grade); 1 June 1940 (Bronze grade); 26 July 1957 (Denazified, swastika-removed version re-established for wear among WWII veterans properly awarded the badge and serving in the Bundeswehr)
- First award: 1939
- Final award: 1945
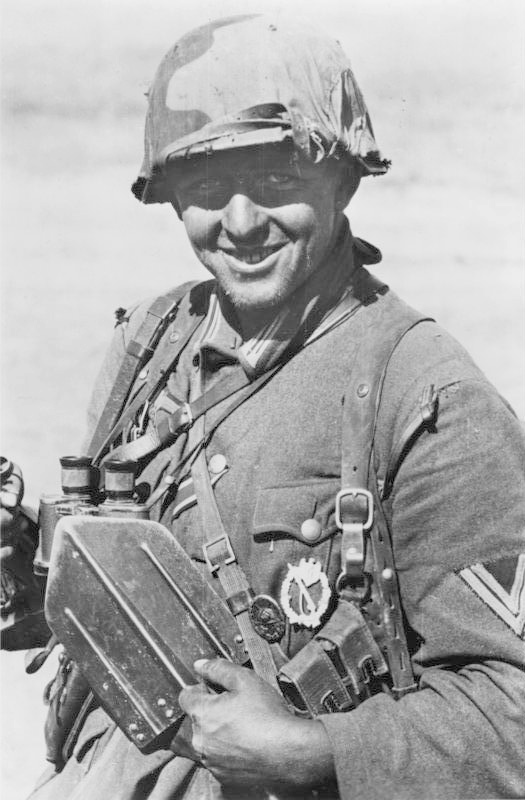
- An infantry soldier wearing the Infantry Assault Badge in Silver in September 1942, during the Battle of Stalingrad.
- Related: General Assault Badge; Close Combat Clasp; Ground Assault Badge of the Luftwaffe

The Infantry Assault Badge (German: Infanterie-Sturmabzeichen) was a German military decoration awarded to Waffen-SS and Wehrmacht Heer soldiers during the Second World War. This decoration was instituted on 20 December 1939 by the Commander-in-Chief (Oberbefehlshaber) of the German Army, Generalfeldmarschall Walther von Brauchitsch. It could be awarded to members of infantry and Gebirgsjäger (mountain infantry) units that had participated in infantry assaults, with light infantry weapons, on at least three separate days of battle in the front line on or after 1 January 1940. When a counter-offensive led to fighting, it could also apply. Award of the Infantry Assault Badge was authorized at the regimental command level, and mechanized or motorized infantry were not eligible for the original badge. A bronze variant of the Infantry Assault Badge was created in June 1940, authorized for motorized and mechanized infantry units, with similar award requirements as the original silver variant. Non-infantry personnel were not eligible for either grade of the Infantry Assault Badge, but were eligible for other combat recognition badges (depending on their military occupation, branch of service, and assigned unit), usually the General Assault Badge, Close Combat Clasp, or the Panzer Badge. The Luftwaffe would develop its own ground combat badge in 1942, the Ground Assault Badge.

== Classes ==
=== Silver ===
The silver class was instituted on 20 December 1939 by the commander of the OKH, Walther von Brauchitsch, and was awarded to infantry soldiers according to one of the following criteria:

- To have taken part in at least three: infantry assaults (including counter-attacks), or at least three armed reconnaissance operations, or engaged in hand-to-hand combat in an assault position, or participated on three separate days in the reestablishment of combat positions.

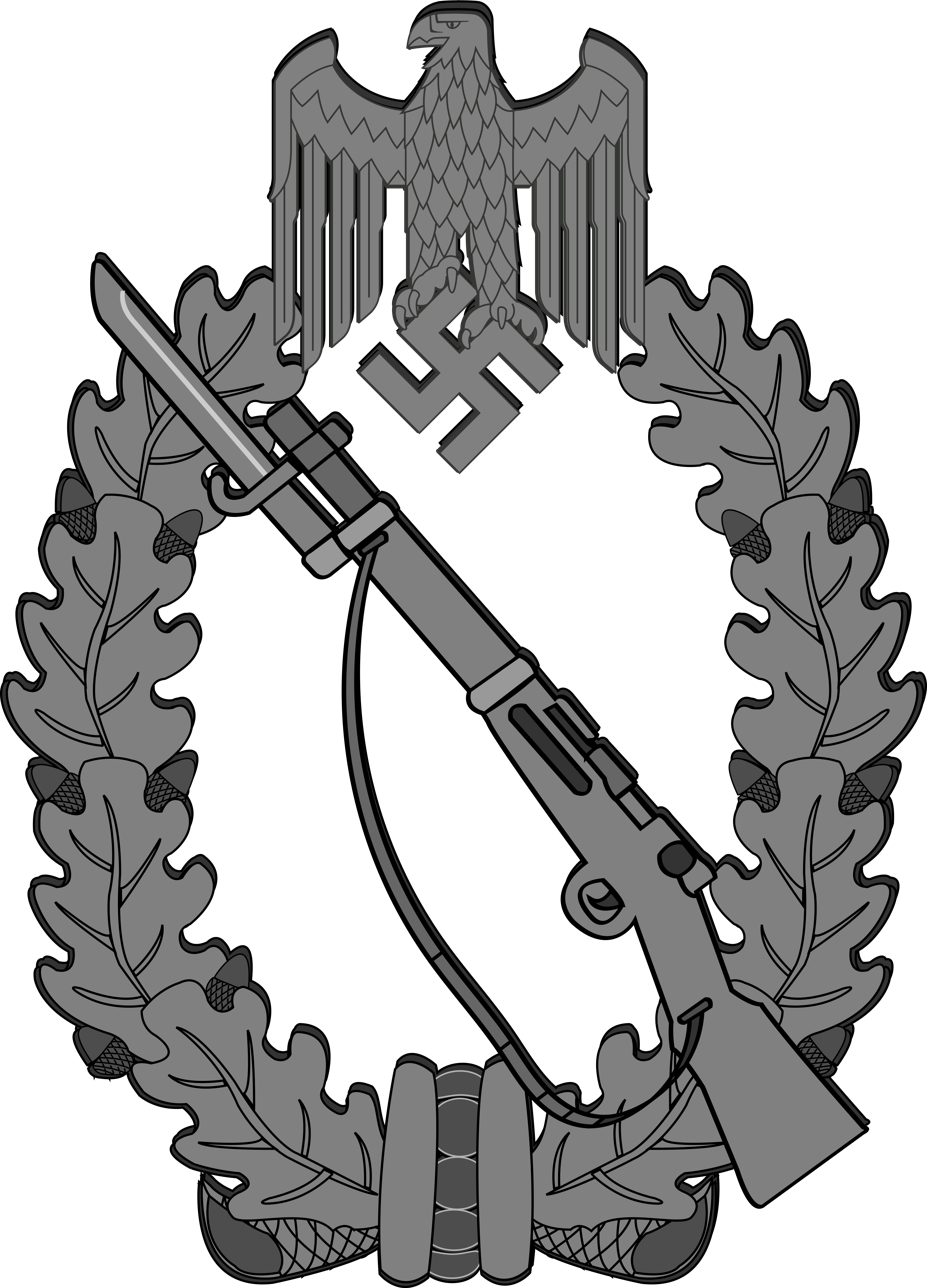
Infantry Assault Badge(Graphical)

=== Bronze ===
The bronze class was instituted on 1 June 1940. It was awarded to motorized/Mechanized Infantry troops according to the same criteria as listed above.

== Design ==
The badge was designed by the company C. E. Junker of Berlin. It is oval in shape, with four oak leaves on each side; on the top is a national eagle clutching a swastika and a rifle with a fixed bayonet across the badge. The reverse of the badge is plain and has a pin attached. The original "silver" badges were made of silver-plate, and the later ones were made of zinc. The "bronze" version was actually made of a "metal alloy".

=== 1957 version ===
On 26 July 1957, the West German federal government passed the "Law of Titles, Orders and Honours" (German: Gesetz über Titel, Orden und Ehrenzeichen), which permitted World War II veterans serving in the Bundeswehr to wear certain earned decorations from the conflict, as long as they were denazified. The Infantry Assault Badge was among the permitted decorations; The re-authorized version had the Reichsadler and swastika removed. Denazified versions of both the silver & bronze grades were authorized and produced.
