= General Assault Badge =

Nazi German military decoration

General Assault Badge Allgemeines Sturmabzeichen
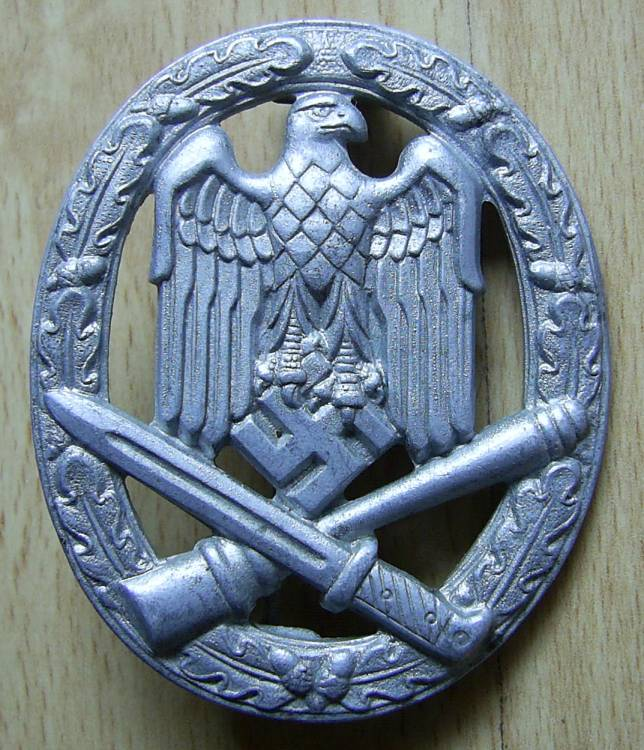
- design by Wilhelm Ernst Peekhaus
- Type: Badge
- Awarded for: participation/support in infantry attacks that did not qualify for the Infantry Assault Badge
- Presented by: Nazi Germany
- Eligibility: Military personnel
- Campaign: World War II
- Status: Obsolete
- Established: 1 June 1940
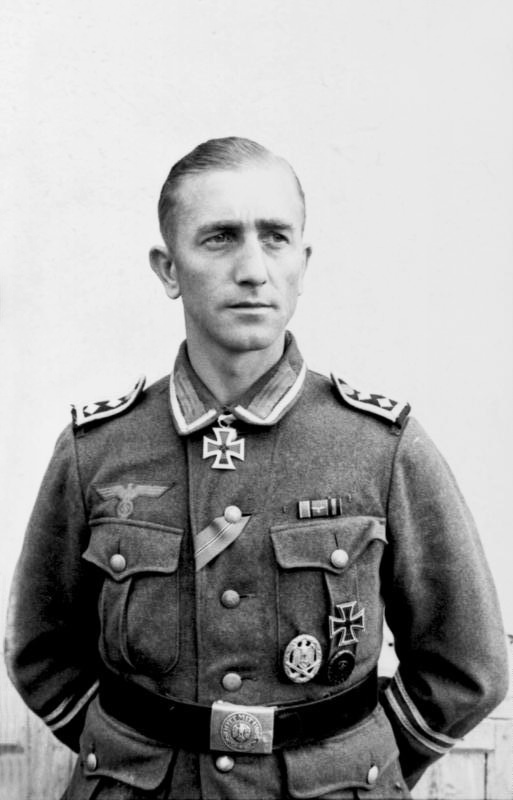
- . Hauptfeldwebel Josef Niemitz, a Wehrmacht Knight's Cross Recipient and non-commissioned officer wearing the General Assault Badge.

The General Assault Badge (German: Allgemeines Sturmabzeichen) was a military decoration awarded during World War II to personnel of the German Army, Waffen-SS and Ordnungspolizei (order police) who supported an infantry attack but were not part of specific infantry units and therefore did not qualify for the Infantry Assault Badge. It was instituted by General Walther von Brauchitsch on 1 June 1940.

== Design ==
The decoration, designed by the Berlin-based firm of Wilhelm Ernst Peekhaus, was an oval disk that measured 5.3 cm (2.1 in) by 4.2 cm (1.7 in), with a depth of .6 cm (0.2 in). A wreath of five oak leaves runs around the circumference on each side of the medal with a pair of acorns at the base. Inside the wreath is a large Wehrmacht-style eagle with folded wings grasping a swastika, which itself surmounts a crossed bayonet and stick grenade. The medal was held in place on the uniform with a pin and catch, and worn on the left chest pocket.

From 22 June 1943, further classes were created, bearing a small plate at the base with the numbers 25, 50, 75, or 100 to recognise soldiers who had taken part in numerous attacks. These were known as grades II through V, accordingly. On the Class IV and Class V badges, the oak leaves which run around the circumference on each side of the medal, along with the bayonet and hand grenade, were larger in size – 5.7 cm (2.2 in) by 4.8 cm (1.9 in). Further, the wreath was gold. Only one badge, the highest level received, was worn.

Nazi-era awards were initially banned by the post-war Federal Republic of Germany. In 1957, many World War II military decorations, including the General Assault Badge, were reauthorised for wear by qualifying veterans. With the display of Nazi symbols banned, the badge was redesigned by removing the swastika, and members of the Bundeswehr wore it on the ribbon bar, represented by a small replica of the award on a field-grey ribbon.

== Criteria for award ==
The medal was originally designed for presentation to combat engineers and to members of the artillery, anti-aircraft, and anti-tank units who supported infantry units in combat. It could also be awarded to medical personnel attending to battlefield casualties in "close combat conditions". Before the introduction of the Tank Destruction Badge in March 1942, the General Assault Badge could be conferred for the single-handed destruction of tanks or armoured vehicles.

Other determining factors for award:

- Ineligibility for the Infantry Assault Badge
- Participation in three infantry or armored attacks on three different days; or
- Participation in three infantry or armored indirect assaults on three different days.
