= Knight's Cross of the Iron Cross =

Highest military award of Nazi Germany

Knight's Cross of the Iron Cross Ritterkreuz des Eisernen Kreuzes
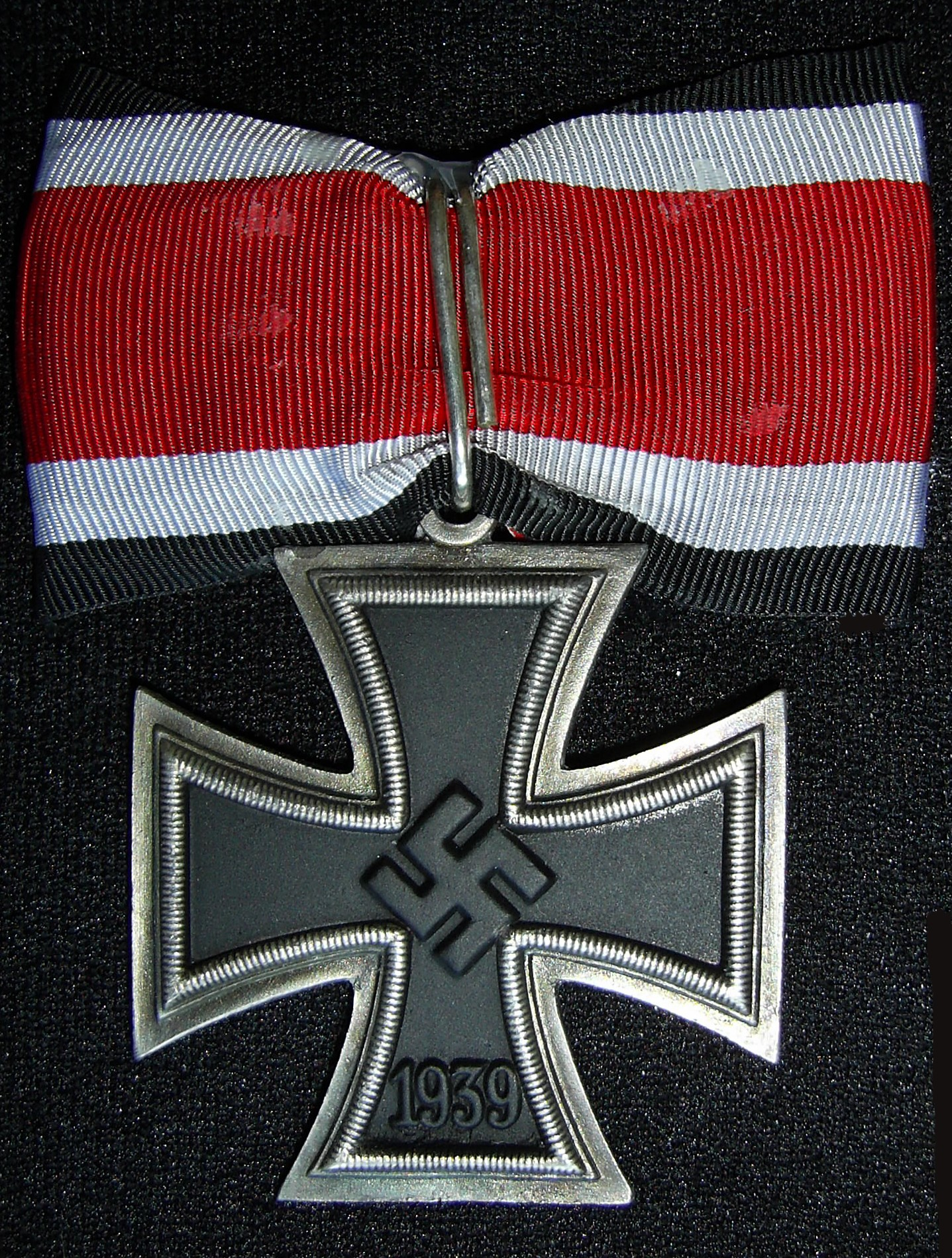
- Type: Neck decoration
- Awarded for: Military valour or outstanding leadership
- Description: The Knights Cross of the Iron Cross is presented as a large iron cross supported by a band that is in the tricolor of the German Empire (Red, White, and black). The cross itself has a large swastika in the middle, with the year 1939 on the bottom arm, while the backside is blank. Depending on the version, the award can have a specific clasp supporting the cross on the ribbon, which includes: Oak leaves Oak leaves and swords Oak leaves, swords, and diamonds Golden Oak leaves with swords and diamonds
- Country: Nazi Germany
- Presented by: the Führer and Reich president
- Eligibility: Military and paramilitary personnel
- Campaign: World War II
- Status: Obsolete
- Established: 1 September 1939
- First award: 30 September 1939

Highlights
- Total awarded posthumously: Swords: 15; Oak Leaves: 95; Knight's Cross: 581
- Total recipients: Over 7,000
- Ribbon

Precedence
- Next (higher): Grand Cross of the Iron Cross
- Next (lower): Iron Cross 1st Class

The Knight's Cross of the Iron Cross (German: Ritterkreuz des Eisernen Kreuzes), or simply the Knight's Cross (Ritterkreuz), and its variants, were the highest awards in the military and paramilitary forces of Nazi Germany during World War II. Of superior distinction to the 1939 Iron Cross, it was the highest award among the decorations of Nazi Germany (except for the unique Grand Cross of the Iron Cross awarded to Reichsmarschall Hermann Göring in July 1940). Over 7,000 Knight's Crosses were awarded during the war.

The Knight's Cross was awarded for a wide range of achievements across all ranks, from a senior commander for skilled battle leadership, to a low-ranking soldier for an act of extraordinary military valour. Presentations were made to members of the three military branches of the Wehrmacht: the Heer (army), the Kriegsmarine (navy) and the Luftwaffe (air force), as well as the Waffen-SS, the Reich Labour Service and the Volkssturm (German People storm militia), as well as to personnel from other Axis powers.

The award was instituted on 1 September 1939, at the onset of the German invasion of Poland, to replace the many older neck-worn merit and bravery awards of the German Empire. A higher grade, the Oak Leaves to the Knight's Cross, was instituted in 1940, followed in 1941 by two yet higher grades, the Knight's Cross with Oak Leaves and Swords, and the Knight's Cross with Oak Leaves, Swords and Diamonds. At the end of 1944, the final grade was created, the Knight's Cross with Golden Oak Leaves, Swords, and Diamonds.

== Historic background ==
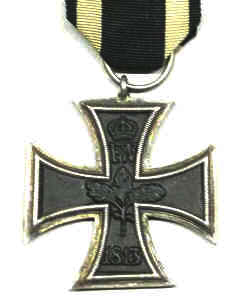
Reverse view of the 1813 Iron Cross

The Prussian king Friedrich Wilhelm III established the Iron Cross at the beginning of the German campaign during the Napoleonic Wars. The design was a silver-framed cast iron cross issued on 13 March 1813, Iron symbolised the fighting spirit of the Prussian army. The Prussian state had mounted a patriotic campaign to rally its citizens to repulse the French occupation. To finance the army, the king implored wealthy Prussians to turn in their jewels to the military in exchange for a man's cast-iron ring or a lady's brooch bearing the legend "Gold I gave for iron" (Gold gab ich für Eisen). The award was reinstituted for the wars in 1870 and 1914.

With the outbreak of World War II on 1 September 1939, Adolf Hitler, as commander-in-chief of the German armed forces, instituted a renewed Iron Cross of 1939 under a new grade, the Knight's Cross of the Iron Cross. The Knight's Cross of the Iron Cross was awarded without distinction between officers and soldiers, in the spirit the National Socialist slogan: "One people, one nation, one leader".

German Federal Archives listed 7,161 officially bestowed recipients, with 863 awards of the Oak Leaves grade, as well as 147 Swords and 27 Diamonds. The Golden Oak Leaves grade was awarded only once, to Hans-Ulrich Rudel on 29 December 1944.

== Grades ==
The 1937 Law of Titles, Orders and Honorary Signs (Gesetz über Titel, Orden und Ehrenzeichen) gave the German Führer and Chancellor (Hitler) the sole power to award orders or honorary signs. The 1939 Führer decree reinstating the Iron Cross reiterated Hitler's repudiation of the Treaty of Versailles, which had explicitly prohibited German military decorations. The renewed Iron Cross was the first honorary sign bestowed by the entire German state.

As the war progressed for four additional years, the need arose to further distinguish those who had already won the Knight's Cross and made new achievements of combat bravery or military success. The Knight's Cross was eventually awarded in five grades:

- Knight's Cross of the Iron Cross
- Knight's Cross of the Iron Cross with Oak Leaves
- Knight's Cross of the Iron Cross with Oak Leaves and Swords
- Knight's Cross of the Iron Cross with Oak Leaves, Swords, and Diamonds
- Knight's Cross of the Iron Cross with Golden Oak Leaves, Swords, and Diamonds.

=== Knight's Cross ===
The Knight's Cross of the Iron Cross was instituted on 1 September 1939. Its appearance was very similar to the previous Iron Cross: a cross pattée, with narrow arms at the center swelling out toward the perimeter. The most common Knight's Crosses were manufactured by Steinhauer & Lück in Lüdenscheid, stamped with "800" on the reverse to indicate 800-grade silver.

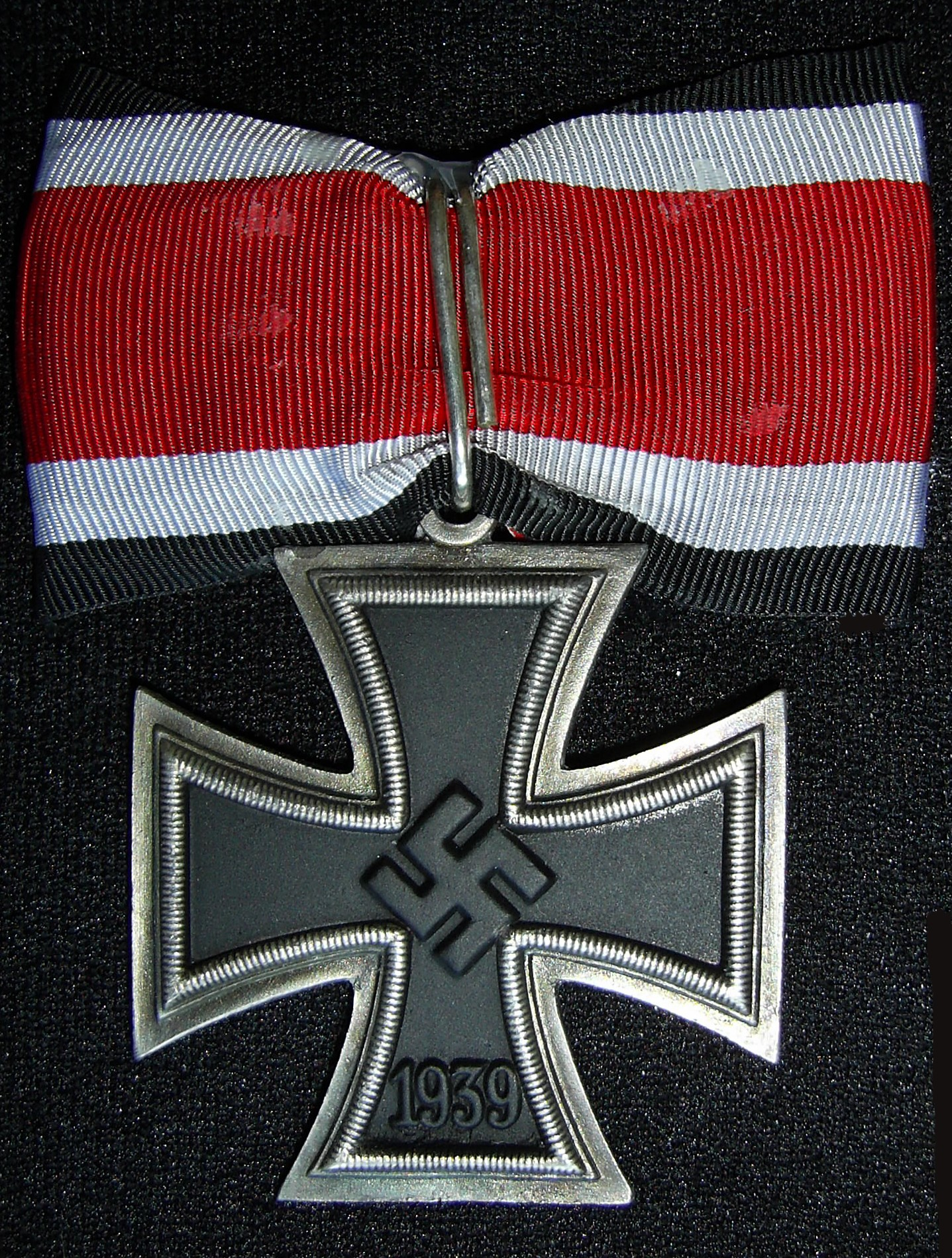
Knight's Cross of the Iron Cross

=== Knight's Cross with Oak Leaves ===
The Knight's Cross of the Iron Cross with Oak Leaves (Ritterkreuz des Eisernen Kreuzes mit Eichenlaub) was instituted on 3 June 1940. Just 52 Knight's Crosses had been awarded before a surge during Case Yellow (Fall Gelb), the invasion of the Netherlands, Belgium, and France, raised the total to 124 before 3 June. The institution of the Oak Leaves grade coincided with Case Red (Fall Rot), the second and decisive phase of the Battle of France.

Like the Knight's Cross to which it was added, the Oak Leaves clasp could be awarded for leadership, distinguished service, or personal gallantry. The Oak Leaves, like the 1813 Iron Cross and Grand Cross of the Iron Cross, was not a National Socialist invention, but originally appeared in the Golden Oak Leaves of the Order of the Red Eagle, which was the second-highest Prussian order after the Order of the Black Eagle. The king had awarded the Oak Leaves together with the Pour le Mérite since 9 October 1813 for gallantry.

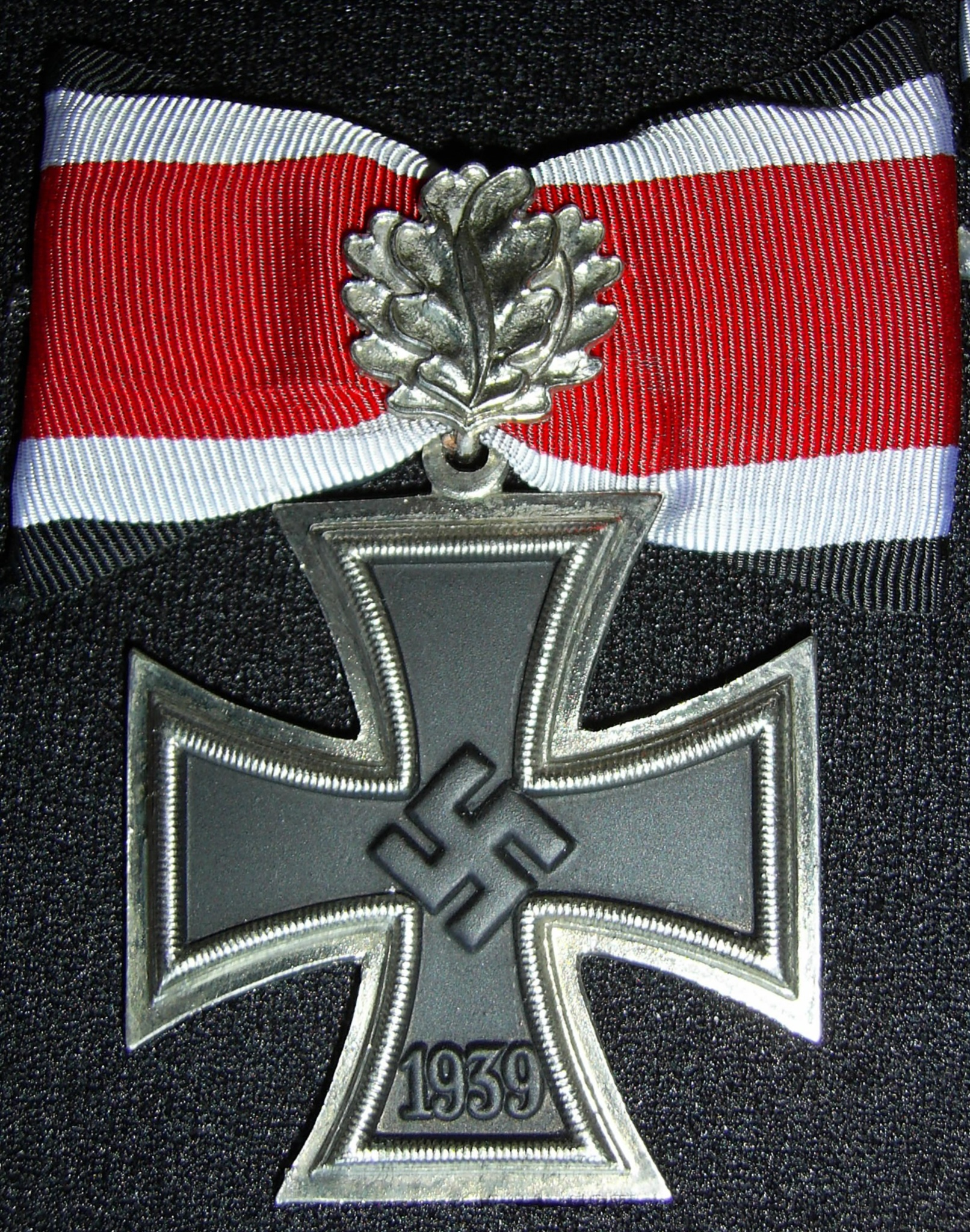
With Oak Leaves

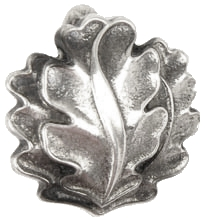
Detail

=== Knight's Cross with Oak Leaves and Swords ===
The Knight's Cross of the Iron Cross with Oak Leaves and Swords (Ritterkreuz des Eisernen Kreuzes mit Eichenlaub und Schwertern) was instituted on 15 July 1941, displaying the oak leaves clasp with a pair of crossed swords soldered to the base.

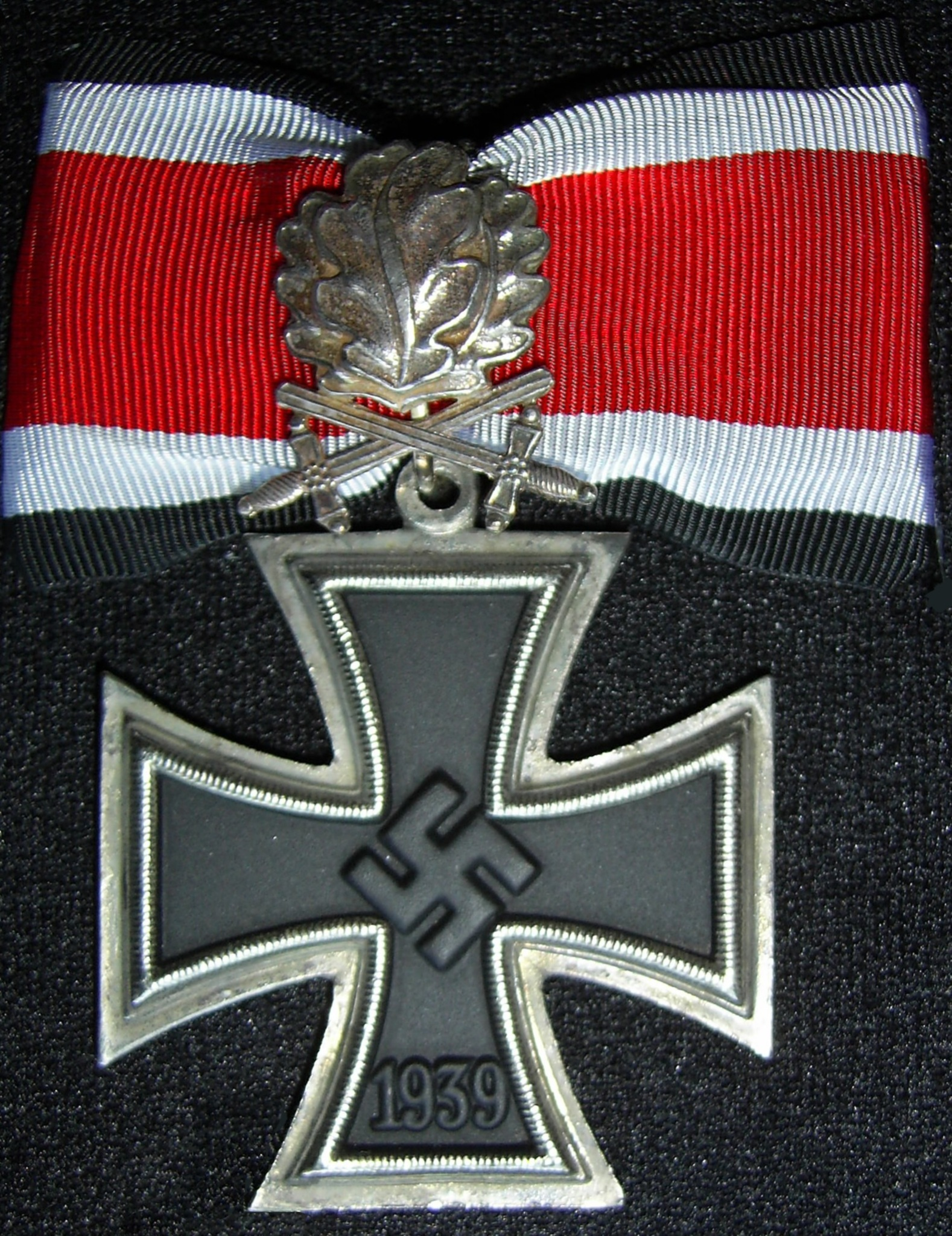
With Oak Leaves and Swords

=== Knight's Cross with Oak Leaves, Swords, and Diamonds ===
The Knight's Cross with Oak Leaves, Swords, and Diamonds (Ritterkreuz des Eisernen Kreuzes mit Eichenlaub, Schwertern und Brillanten) was also instituted on 15 July 1941. The first recipients were Werner Mölders and Adolf Galland. The medal came as a set including the more elaborate A-piece for ceremonial occasions, and the B-piece, a second clasp with rhinestones for everyday wear. The Diamonds were awarded 27 times during World War II. Hans-Joachim Marseille, the 4th recipient, was killed in an aircraft crash before its presentation. The deteriorating situation and the end of the war prevented its presentation to Karl Mauss, the 26th recipient, and Dietrich von Saucken, the 27th and final recipient.

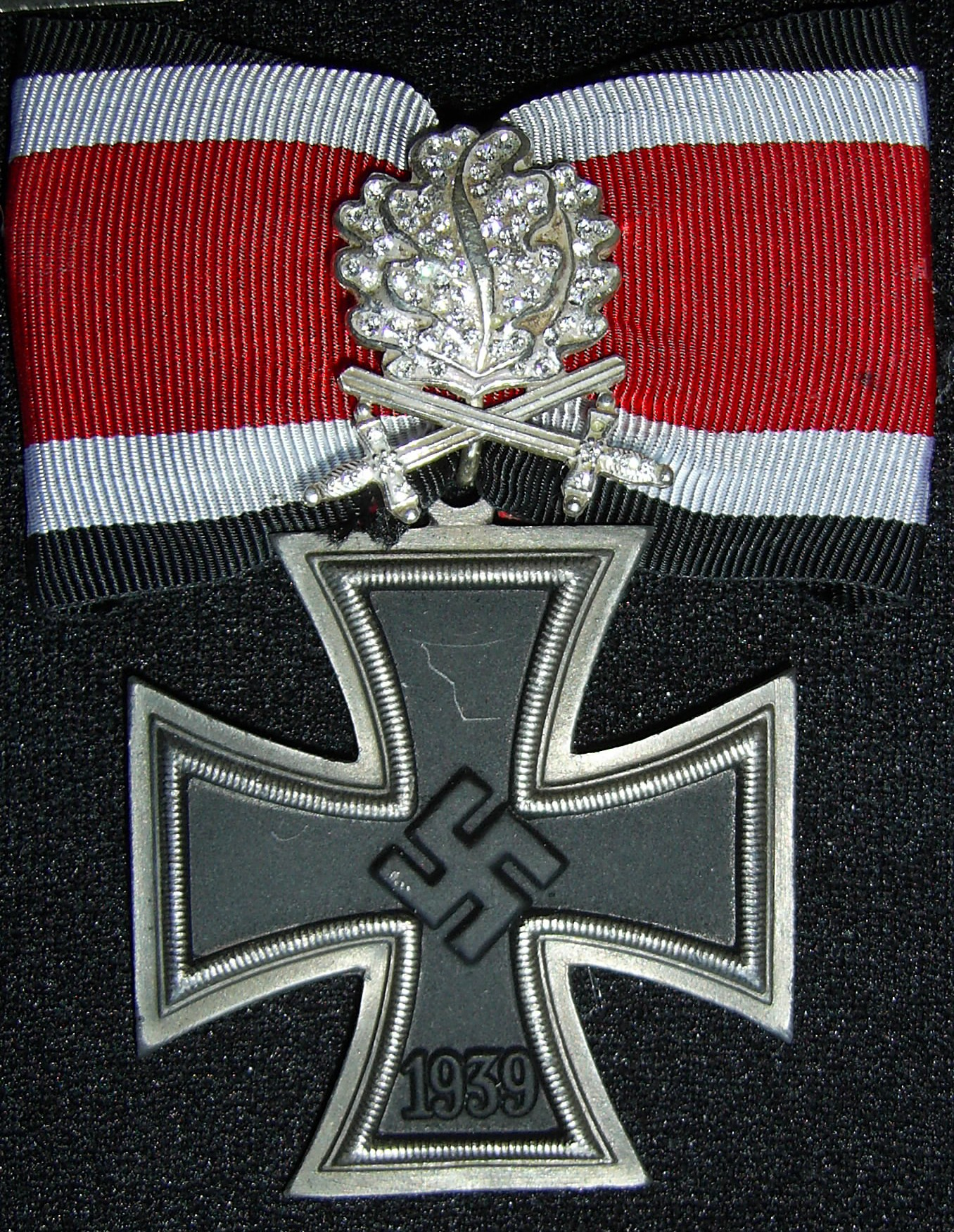
With Oak Leaves, Swords and Diamonds

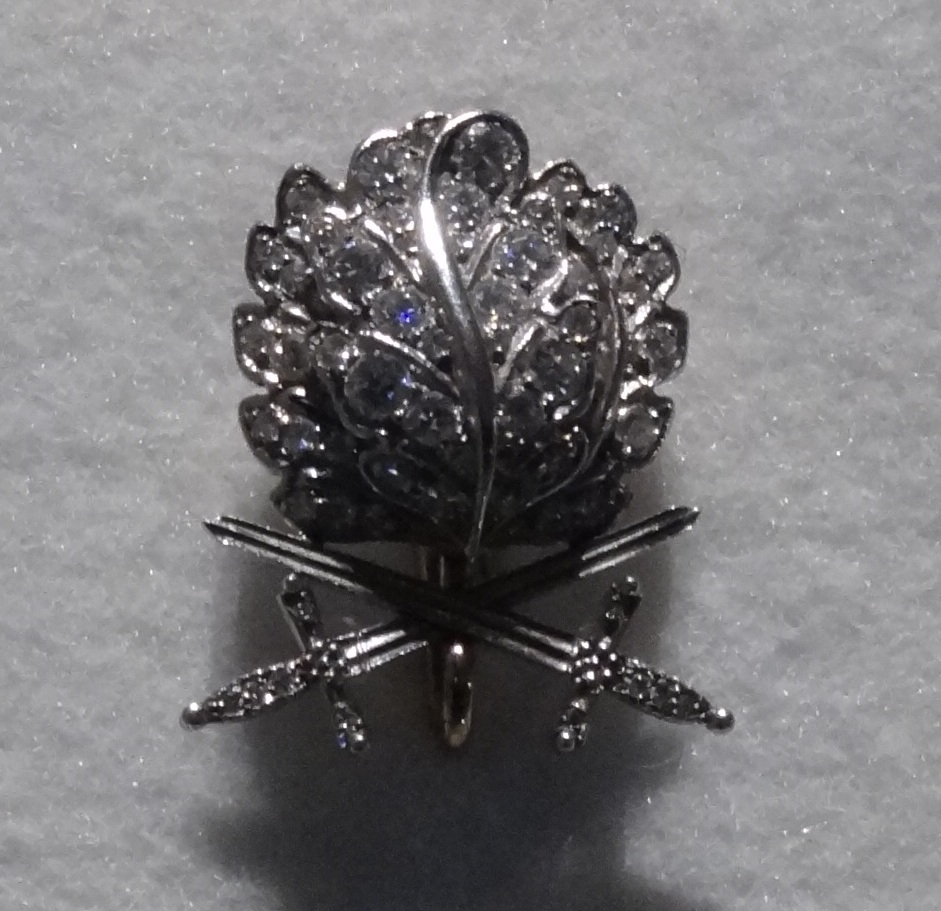
Helmut Lent's Diamonds, Bundeswehr Military History Museum

=== Knight's Cross with Golden Oak Leaves, Swords, and Diamonds ===
The Knight's Cross with Golden Oak Leaves, Swords, and Diamonds (Ritterkreuz des Eisernen Kreuzes mit goldenem Eichenlaub, Schwertern und Brillanten) was instituted on 29 December 1944. This medal was the highest level, originally intended for 12 of the most distinguished servicemen in the entire German armed forces after the war ended. Six sets were manufactured, consisting of an A-piece made of 18-carat gold with 58 real diamonds, and a B-piece made of 14-carat gold with 68 real sapphires. One was presented to Hans-Ulrich Rudel on 1 January 1945; the remaining five were taken to Schloss Klessheim, where they were captured by US forces.

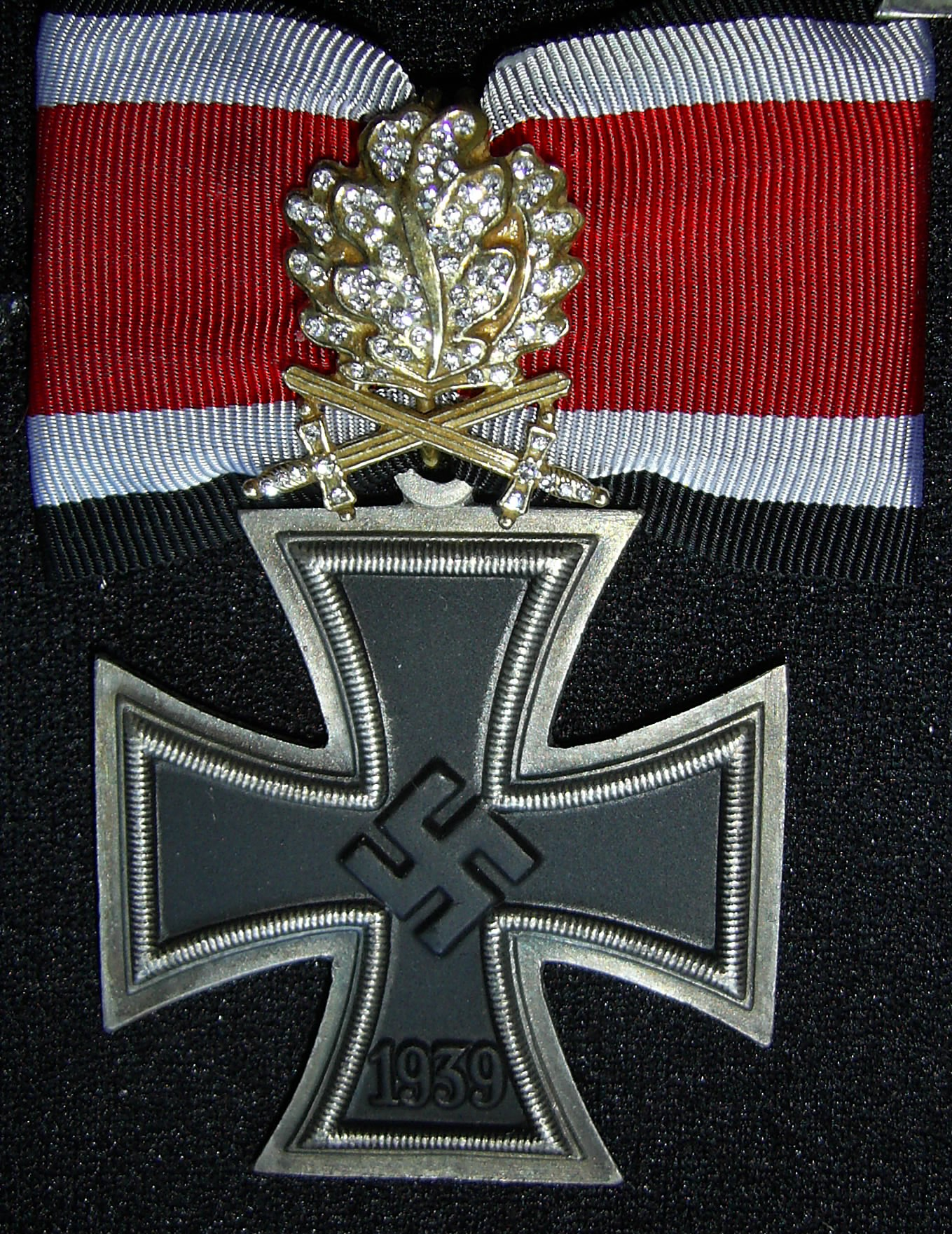
With Golden Oak Leaves, Swords, and Diamonds

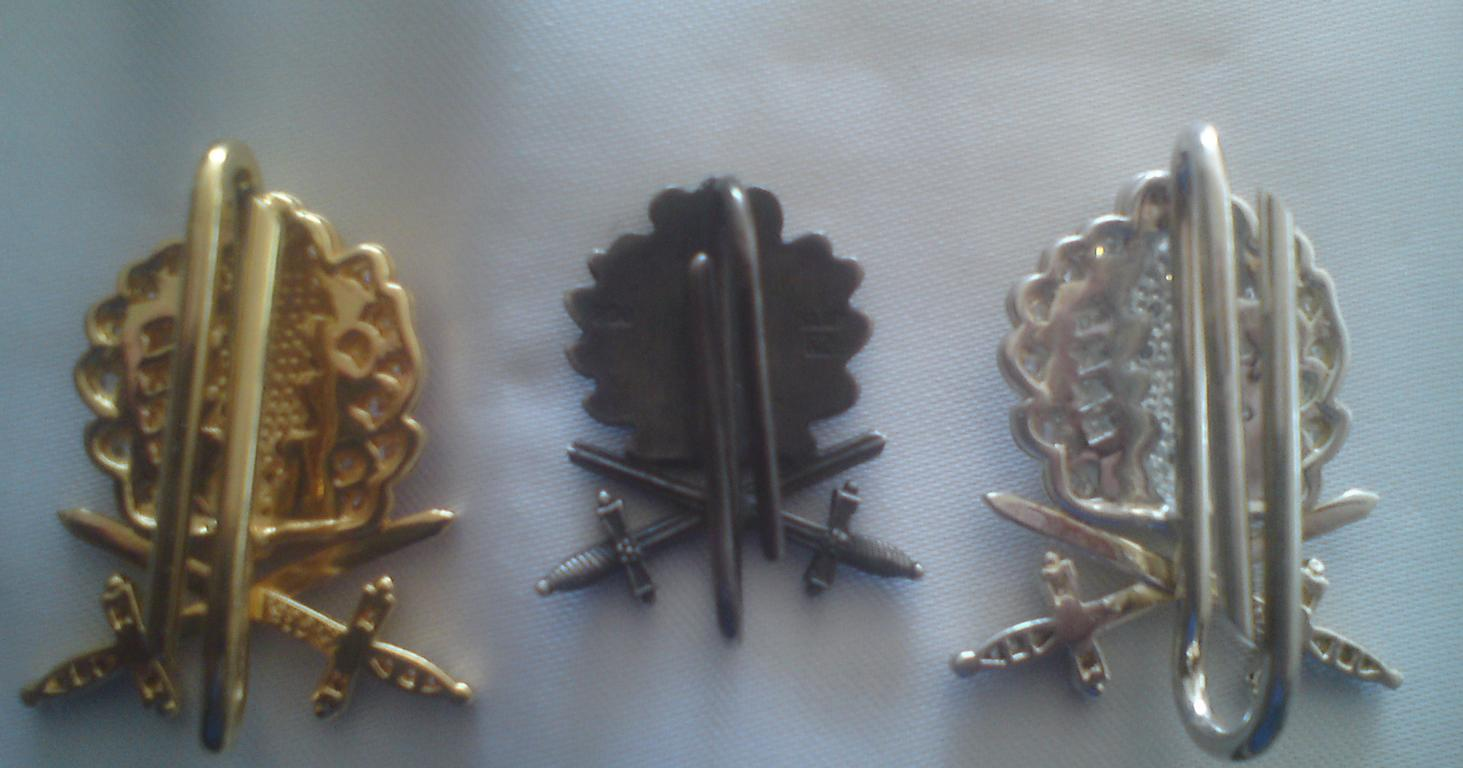
Rear side of the Oak Leaves of the Knight's Cross of the Iron Cross

== Nomination and approval procedure ==
Award

Manufacturers
Presidential Chancellery
Der Führer
Chief of the Army Personnel Office
Heerespersonalamt; Referat 5a
Oberkommando des Heeres
Army group
Army
Division
Lower commands
Soldier

Nomination

To qualify for the Knight's Cross, a soldier had to already hold the 1939 Iron Cross First Class, though the Iron Cross First Class was awarded concurrently with the Knight's Cross in some cases. Unit commanders could also be awarded the medal for the unit's exemplary conduct as a whole. Also, U-boat commanders could qualify for sinking 100,000 tons of shipping, and Luftwaffe pilots could qualify for accumulating 20 "points" (with one point being awarded for shooting down a single-engine plane, two points for a twin-engine plane, and three for a four-engine plane, with all points being doubled at night). It was issued from 1939 to 1945, with requirements gradually raised as the war progressed.

Nominations for the Knight's Cross could be made at the company level or higher. Commanders could not nominate themselves. In this instance, the division adjutant made the recommendation. In the Luftwaffe, the lowest level was the Geschwader and in the Kriegsmarine, the respective flotilla was authorized to make the nomination. It was also possible to nominate subordinated foreign units. The nomination had to be submitted in writing, in duplicate. The format and the content were predefined. Every nomination contained the soldier's personal data, rank, and unit at the time of the act, the date the soldier held this position, the military service entry date, previous military decorations awarded, and the date of presentation, etc. For enlisted soldiers and noncommissioned officers the résumé had to be submitted as well.

The nomination had to be forwarded in writing by a courier up the official command chain. Every intermittent administrative office or commander between the nominating unit and the commander-in-chief of the respective Wehrmacht branch (commander-in-chief of the Heer, commander-in-chief of the Luftwaffe, and commander-in-chief of the Kriegsmarine with their respective staff offices) had to give their approval along with a short comment. In exceptional cases, such as when the nominated individual had sustained severe injuries or when the command chain had been interrupted, a nomination could be submitted via teleprinter communication.

At first, the recipient of the Knight's Cross, or one of its higher grades, received a brief telegram informing him of the award of the Knight's Cross of the Iron Cross. Thereafter, he received a Vorläufiges Besitzzeugnis (Preliminary Testimonial of Ownership). The award was also noted in the recipient's Soldbuch (Soldier's Pay Book), his Wehrpass (Military Identification), and personnel records.

=== Approval authority ===
From 1 September 1939 to Adolf Hitler's death on 30 April 1945, all Knight's Cross awards for Heer personnel were approved by Hitler, after prior approval by the head of the Heerespersonalamt and the Oberkommando der Wehrmacht (OKW).

After 30 April 1945, amid the rapid disintegration of Germany's government and armed forces, it is unclear who had the authority to approve awards. A teleprinter message dated 3 May authorized the commanders-in-chief of those units still engaged in combat to award the Knight's Cross by themselves.

Likely on 7 May, just before Germany's surrender on 8 May, Hitler's successor Karl Dönitz decreed a blanket approval of all nominations received by the OKW up until the surrender. The validity of this "Dönitz decree" (Dönitz-Erlaß) was contested after the war, and the German military archive agency (WASt) concluded that it violated Nazi legislation that required a case-by-case decision.

== Recipients ==
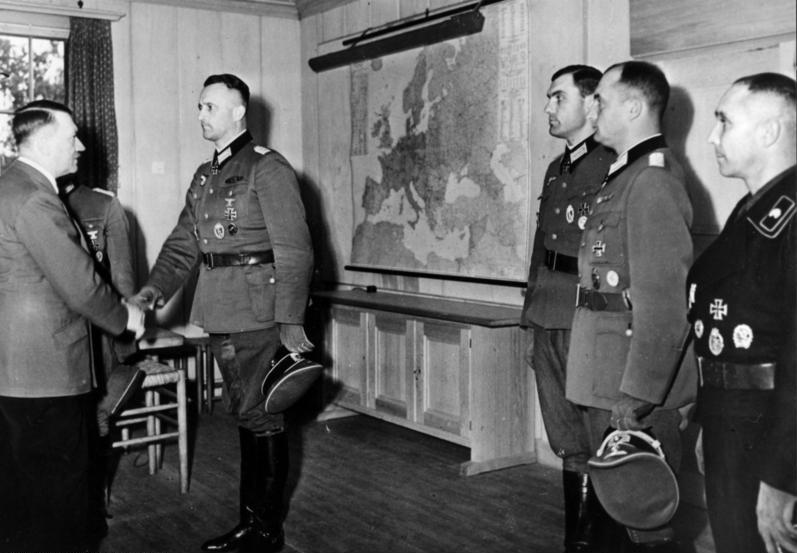
Adolf Hitler presenting Oak Leaves at a ceremony on 15 September 1943

Analysis of the German Federal Archives revealed evidence for 7,161 officially bestowed recipients. The German Federal Archives substantiate 863 awards of the Oak Leaves to the Knight's Cross, along with the 147 Swords and 27 Diamonds awards. Author Veit Scherzer concluded that every presentation of the Knight's Cross of the Iron Cross, or one of its higher grades, made until 20 April 1945, is verifiable in the German Federal Archives. The first echelon of the Heerespersonalamt Abteilung P 5/Registratur (Army Personnel Office Department P 5/Registry) was relocated from Zossen in Brandenburg to Traunstein in Bavaria on this day, and the confusion regarding who can be considered a legitimate Knight's Cross recipient began.

Hitler frequently presented the Oak Leaves and higher grades himself. The first presentations in 1940 and 1941 were made in the Reich Chancellery in Berlin or at the Berghof near Berchtesgaden. Beginning with Operation Barbarossa, the invasion of the Soviet Union, the presentations were made at the Führer Headquarters "Wolf's Lair" in East Prussia, in the "Werwolf" near Vinnytsia in Ukraine, and at the Berghof. After the 20 July plot, Hitler himself made presentations only sporadically. Hitler's last presentations were given early in 1945 in the Führerbunker in Berlin. Senior commanders, like the commanders-in-chief of the Kriegsmarine and the Luftwaffe, and, from the autumn of 1944, also the Reichsführer-SS Heinrich Himmler, made the presentations instead.

== Association of Knight's Cross Recipients ==
The Association of Knight's Cross Recipients (German language: Ordensgemeinschaft der Ritterkreuzträger des Eisernen Kreuzes e.V. (OdR)) was an association of highly decorated soldiers of both world wars. The association was founded in 1955 in Cologne by Alfred Keller, Knight of the Order Pour le Mérite and recipient of the Knight's Cross of the Iron Cross. Later, the recipients of the Prussian Golden Military Merit Cross, or the Pour le Mérite for enlisted personnel, were included. The OdR listed the awarding of 7318 Knight's Crosses, as well as 882 Oak Leaves, 159 Swords, 27 Diamonds, 1 Golden Oak Leaves, and 1 Grand Cross of the Iron Cross for all ranks in the three branches of the Wehrmacht and the Waffen-SS. However, 200 of the OdR-listed cases lack official proof of award.

In 1999, German SPD Minister of Defence Rudolf Scharping banned any contacts between the Bundeswehr and the association, stating that it and many of its members shared neo-Nazi and revanchist ideas which were not in conformity with the German constitution and Germany's postwar policies.

== Post-war ==
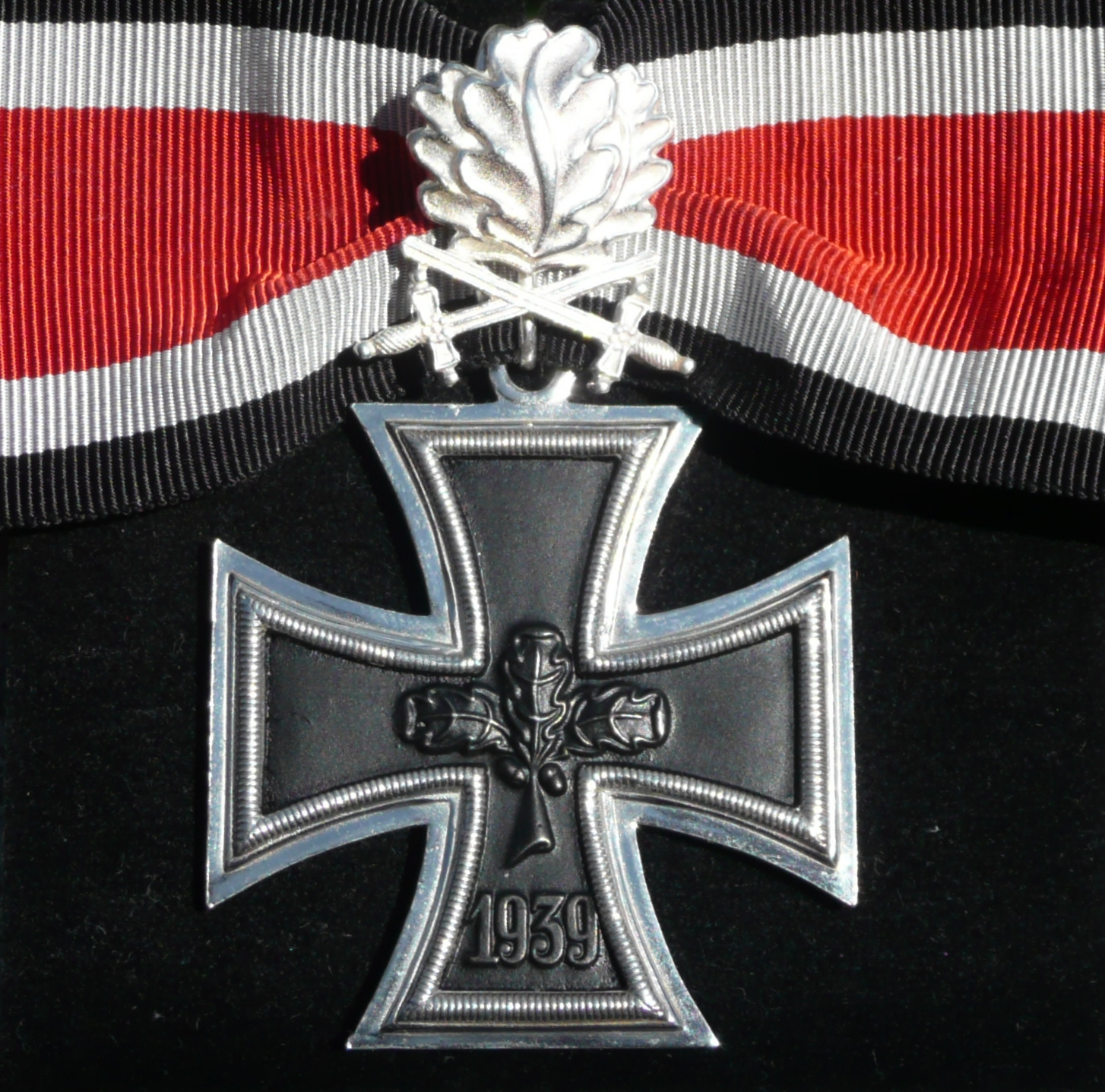
Denazified Knight's Cross with Oak Leaves and Swords

The German Law on Titles, Orders and Honours (German: Gesetz über Titel, Orden und Ehrenzeichen) regulates the wearing of the Knight's Cross in post-World War II Germany. German law prohibits wearing a swastika, so on 26 July 1957, the West German government authorized replacement Knight's Crosses with an Oak Leaf Cluster in place of the swastika, similar to the Iron Cross of 1914, and the denazified Iron Cross of 1957, which World War II recipients could wear.
