= Josef Harpe =

German general (1887–1968)

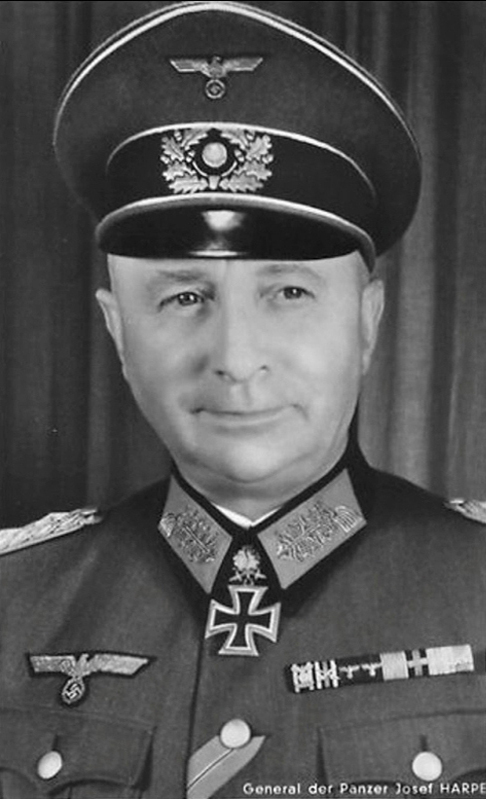
- Born: 21 September 1887; Buer, German Empire
- Died: 14 March 1968 (aged 80); Nuremberg, Bavaria, West Germany
- Military career
- Allegiance: German Empire; Weimar Republic; Nazi Germany
- Branch: German Army
- Service years: 1909–1945
- Rank: Generaloberst
- Commands: 12th Panzer Division; XXXXI Panzer Corps; 9th Army; Army Group North Ukraine; Army Group A 4th Panzer Army; 5th Panzer Army
- Conflicts: World War I; World War II; Invasion of Poland; Operation Barbarossa; Vistula–Oder Offensive; Ruhr Pocket (surrendered)
- Awards: Knight's Cross of the Iron Cross with Oak Leaves and Swords

Josef Harpe (21 September 1887 – 14 March 1968) was a German general during World War II who commanded the 9th Army. He was a recipient of the Knight's Cross of the Iron Cross with Oak Leaves and Swords of Nazi Germany.

Harpe served on the Eastern Front, where he commanded XXXXI Panzer Corps and the 9th Army. From September 1944 to January 1945 Army Group A, when he was relieved of his command due to the inability of German forces to stop the Soviet Vistula–Oder Offensive. He ended the war commanding the 5th Panzer Army on Western Front.

Harpe was also responsible for establishing the Ozarichi death camps, which is considered by historians to be one of the worst atrocities committed by the Wehrmacht.

== Military career and war crimes ==
Harpe joined the Prussian Army on 28 September 1909 and fought in World War I. After the war, Harpe remained in the Reichswehr military service. In 1931, under the pseudonym Direktor Hacker, he held a position in the secret German-Russian Tank-School (Kama tank school) in Kazan, Soviet Union. He was promoted to Oberstleutnant on 1 August 1934 and became commander of Panzer-Regiment 3 on 15 October 1935. He was again promoted on 1 January 1937, and commanded the German 1st Panzer Brigade holding the rank of Oberst. In 1940 he took over as Commandant of the Armoured Troops School No.2 in Wünsdorf.

He served on the Eastern Front, where he commanded, from July 1942 until October 1943 the XXXXI Panzerkorps and from September 1944 to January 1945 Army Group A. On 12 March 1944, Harpe established the makeshift Ozarichi death camps in Belarus. There were no buildings or sanitary facilities; it was just a massive closed-off area with barbed wire. Soldiers of the 35th Infantry Division, led by Johann-Georg Richert, reinforced by additional troops from Sonderkommando 7b of Einsatzgruppe B, forced at least 40,000 civilians into the camp, shooting at least 400 of them along the way after they became too weak to continue walking. The prisoners were mostly family members of slave laborers, children under 13, the sick, mothers with infants, and the elderly. These people were viewed by the Germans as "useless mouths".

The prisoners, many of whom had contracted typhus, had to survive in the open in the marshlands without shelter, medical aid, food, or water. "There was a gate with barbed wire, small watch towers with soldiers and German shepherds, but nothing else," recalled one survivor, Larisa Stashkevich. She said that anyone who even attempted to light a campfire was immediately gunned down. The only way to keep warm was to use the corpses of murdered prisoners.

Dieter Pohl has called the establishment of the camp "one of the worst crimes the Wehrmacht ever committed against civilians". By the time troops of the 65th Army of the First Belorussian Front liberated those in the camps on 19 March 1944, at least 9000 people had died. The German high command celebrated the thousands of deaths as a success, calling the civilians "useless mouths". The troops freed 33,480 people, including 15,960 children under the age of 13, from the Ozarichi concentration camps.

He was relieved of his command due to the inability of German forces to stop the Soviet Vistula–Oder Offensive, which resulted in the Soviet capture of most of Poland. He ended the war as the commander of the 5th Panzer Army on the Western Front. Harpe was taken prisoner by the United States Army on 17 April 1945. Although Harpe was held as a prisoner of war by the United States, he was never charged with any crimes. He was released from custody on 14 April 1948, and died a free man in 1968.

Although Harpe never faced prosecution for the Ozarichi camps, Richert did. He was prosecuted by a Soviet military court in the Minsk Trial for his role in the deportations and other atrocities against Soviet civilians. Richert was sentenced to death, and hanged in 1946.

== Awards ==
- Iron Cross (1914) 2nd Class (21 September 1914) & 1st Class (3 September 1915)
- Wound Badge (1914) in Black (20 May 1918)
- Wehrmacht Long Service Award 1st Class (2 October 1936)
- Clasp to the Iron Cross (1939) 2nd and 1st Class
  - Knight's Cross on 13 August 1941 as Generalmajor and commander of the 12. Panzer-Division
  - Oak Leaves on 31 December 1941 as Generalmajor and commander of the 12. Panzer-Division
  - Swords on 15 September 1943 as General der Panzertruppe and commanding general of the XXXXI. Panzerkorps
- German Cross in Gold on 19 February 1943 as General der Panzertruppe and commanding general of the XXXXI.Panzerkorps

Military offices
Preceded by Paul Bader	Commander of 2. Infanterie-Division; 5 October 1940 – 10 January 1941	Succeeded by: 12. Panzerdivision
Preceded by: 2. Infanterie-Division	Commander of 12. Panzerdivision; 10 January 1941 – 15 January 1942	Succeeded by Generalleutnant Walter Wessel
Preceded by General of Panzer Troops Walter Model	Commander of XXXXI Army Corps renamed July 1942 XXXXI Panzerkorps; 15 January 1942 – 15 October 1943	Succeeded by General of Artillery Helmuth Weidling
Preceded by Generalfeldmarschall Walter Model	Commander of 9. Armee; 4 November 1943 – 19 May 1944	Succeeded by General Hans Jordan
Preceded by Generaloberst Erhard Raus	Commander of 4. Panzer-Armee; 18 May 1944 – 28 June 1944	Succeeded by General der Panzertruppe Walther Nehring
Preceded by Generalfeldmarschall Walter Model	Commander of Army Group North Ukraine renamed September 1944 Army Group A 16 August 1944 – 17 January 1945	Succeeded by Generaloberst Ferdinand Schörner
Preceded by General der Panzertruppe Hasso von Manteuffel	Commander of 5. Panzer-Armee; 8 March 1945 – 17 April 1945	Succeeded by none
