= Hans Oschmann =

- Born: 24 December 1894; Schöneberg
- Died: 14 November 1944 (aged 49); Faimbe
- Military career
- Allegiance: Nazi Germany
- Branch: German Army
- Rank: Generalleutnant
- Commands: Director of cipher department of the General der Nachrichtenaufklärung
- Conflicts: World War II

Hans Oschmann (24 December 1894, Schöneberg – 14 November 1944, at Faimbe) was a German Army general (German: Generalleutnant) and signals officer, who was involved in the early command of the German signal intelligence organization (German: Reichswehrministerium Chiffrierabteilung) (German Defense Ministry) and would later become director of the cipher unit at the Reichswehrministerium Chiffrierabteilung, later the (General der Nachrichtenaufklärung) between 1932 and 1934. He was the son of General (German: Generalmajor) Albert Oschmann, who was considered an expert of motor transportation and field transportation within the operational theater.

During his command, Oschmann created three additional fixed intercept stations, bringing the number to ten. He also ran the Cipher and Monitoring service, (German: Chiffrier und Horchleitstelle), that was created in 1921, to collect and decipher passive intelligence, that operated within and part of German Defense Ministry, (German: Reichswehrministerium). Due to the number of ministerial cipher bureaus that were proliferating in the defense ministry, Oschmann saw a need for a central agency, independent from the Abwehr, that would collect and decipher operational intelligence and pushed for the new agency and achieve independence from the German Defense Ministry, which eventually came about. This new agency was called the Intercept Control Station (HLS) (German: Horchleitstelle) and was created sometime in 1933/34. That organisation would eventually become the General der Nachrichtenaufklärung.

== Life ==
Oschmann married Ute Aschenborn on 1 December 1919 and had two children.

== Military career ==
In 1913, Oschmann joined the Royal Prussian Army as an ensign, (German: Fahnenjunker). He was posted to the telegraph battalion No. 1 and was promoted to second lieutenant (German: Leutnant) on 6 August 1914. On 18 April 1918 he was promoted to first lieutenant (German: Oberleutnant). On 1 October 1919, he joined the Army Signals Intelligence School (German: Nachrichtenschule). In early 1920, he joined the Signals Intelligence Department 15 (German: Nachrichten-Abteilung 15). As part of the creation of the 100,000 man Transitional Army (German: Übergangsheer) of the Reichswehr, he joined the 3rd Prussian Signals Department (German: 3. (Preuß.) Nachrichten-Abteilung). On 1 April 1923, he was transferred to the 11th (Saxon) Infantry Regiment and was immediately sent to the Technische Hochschule in Charlottenburg (now Technische Universität Berlin) for further training. From 1 October 1923, he was then registered for several years as a company officer in the 9th Company of the 6th Infantry Regiment in Flensburg. Between 1925 and 1926 he received the addition of the Dipl. Ing (Diplom) in front of his name, in the original French called (French: Diplôme d'Ingénieur), by undertaking an academic degree in engineering. On 1 October 1926, he was promoted to the rank of captain (German: Hauptmann). On 1 March 1927, he was then appointed chief of the 2nd (Hess.) Company of the 5th Signals Intelligence division of the 5th Infantry Division in Bad Cannstatt.

On 1 February 1931 he was then transferred to the Reichswehrministerium where he was employed in the departure office (Abw) until 1934, when he was promoted to major. On 1 October 1935, he was transferred to the staff of the Prussian Military Academy. On 1 June 1936, he was transferred to the Army Intelligence School (German: Nachrichtenschule des Heeres) as a teacher. On 1 March 1937, he was promoted to lieutenant-colonel (German: Oberstleutnant). On 1 April 1937 he became commander of the Signals Department 7 (German: Nachrichten-Abteilung 7) in Munich. On 1 April 1938, he was appointed to commander of Signals Group VII (German: Kommandeur der Nachrichtentruppe). After the start of World War II, he was appointed commander of XIII Signals group (German: Kommandeur der Nachrichtentruppe XIII) in Nuremberg. After giving up his command in mid-May during 1941, he was appointed commander of Intercept Group 666 (listening group) (German: Horchtruppen 666). At the beginning of the summer of 1941, he joined in the eastern campaign to lean and attack on northern Russia by as part of Army Group North. From 10 October 1942 to 25 January 1943, he commanded Signals Intelligence Unit 3 (German: Nachrichtenaufklärung 3).

He was promoted to colonel (German: Oberst) on 1 February 1940, and later major general in March 1943.

He assumed command of the 741st Grenadier Regiment on 31 March 1943 On 1 August 1943, he was promoted to major general and appointed commander of the Eastern Z.b.V. 704, (Z.b.V.), the same time as successor to Major General Wilhelm White. On 1 November 1943, he gained leadership of the 286th Security Division (German: 286. Sicherungs-Division) as successor to Lieutenant-General Johann-Georg Richert. On 1 February 1944, he was then appointed commander of the 286th Security Division. During Operation Bagration General Oschmann was slightly wounded during an air attack near Byerazino on 30 June 1944. The unit was eventually subordinated to Lieutenant General Friedrich-Georg Eberhardt in August 1944. In September 1944, after a leave of absence in the Führerreserve, he was appointed commander of the 338th Infantry Division in France, as successor to Lieutenant-General René de l'Homme de Courbière.

On 14 November 1944, he was ambushed while investigating in a French position between Bretigney and Faimbe, while with Lieutenant-General Friedrich-August Schack, who escaped the position. He was posthumously promoted to lieutenant general on 1 November 1944.
