= 286th Security Division =

286th Security Division: 286. Sicherungs-Division
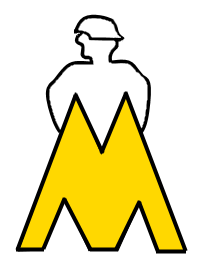
- Active: March 1941 - April 1945
- Country: Nazi Germany
- Branch: Army (Wehrmacht)
- Type: Infantry
- Role: Security
- Size: Division
- Part of: Army Group Centre Rear Area; Army Group Centre
- Garrison/HQ: Altkirch
- Engagements: Eastern Front

Commanders
- Notable commanders: Johann-Georg Richert

The 286th Security Division (286. Sicherungs-Division) was a rear-security division in the Wehrmacht during World War II. The unit was deployed in German-occupied areas of the Soviet Union, in the Army Group Centre Rear Area. It was responsible for large-scale war crimes and atrocities including the deaths of thousands of Soviet civilians.

== Operational history ==
The 286th Security Division was formed on 15 March 1941 around elements of the 213th Infantry Division, initially with one infantry regiment (354th). By 1942 another two Security Regiments, 61 (upgraded from the Landesschützen-Regiment staff 61) and 122, were attached. A variety of units were subordinated to the division during its existence, including battalions of Russian troops and from February 1944 Grenadier Regiment 638, consisting of French volunteers, the LVF.

During this period the division was assigned to Fourth Army, where it carried out occupation, economic exploitation and security duties in rear areas. It was involved in punitive operations against the local populace: these actions were carried out with extreme brutality (in total, Belarus lost up to a quarter of its population during the German occupation). A defendant at the post-war Minsk Trial, Paul Eick, stated that he had set out to create and then liquidate a ghetto in the town of Orsha under the division's command.

In June 1944, the Fourth Army was encircled by Soviet forces during the liberation of the Belorussian SSR, Operation Bagration. The 286th Security Division was overrun and destroyed in the vicinity of Orsha. Its remnants were reorganised late that year at Memel as the 286th Infantry Division, assigned to the Third Panzer Army; it was again destroyed at Neukuhren during the battles in Samland towards the end of the war.

== Commanders ==
- Generalleutnant Kurt Müller (15 March 1941)
- Generalleutnant Johann-Georg Richert (15 June 1942)
- Generalleutnant Hans Oschmann (1 November 1943)
- Generalleutnant Friedrich-Georg Eberhardt (5 August 1944)

== 286th Infantry Division ==
- Generalleutnant Friedrich-Georg Eberhardt (December 1944)
- Generalleutnant Wilhelm Thomas (26 December 1944 – 26 January 1945)
- Oberst Willi Schmidt (January 1945)
- Generalmajor Emmo von Roden (January–May 1945)

== See also ==
- War crimes of the Wehrmacht
