= Friedrich-Georg Eberhardt =

German general (1892–1964)

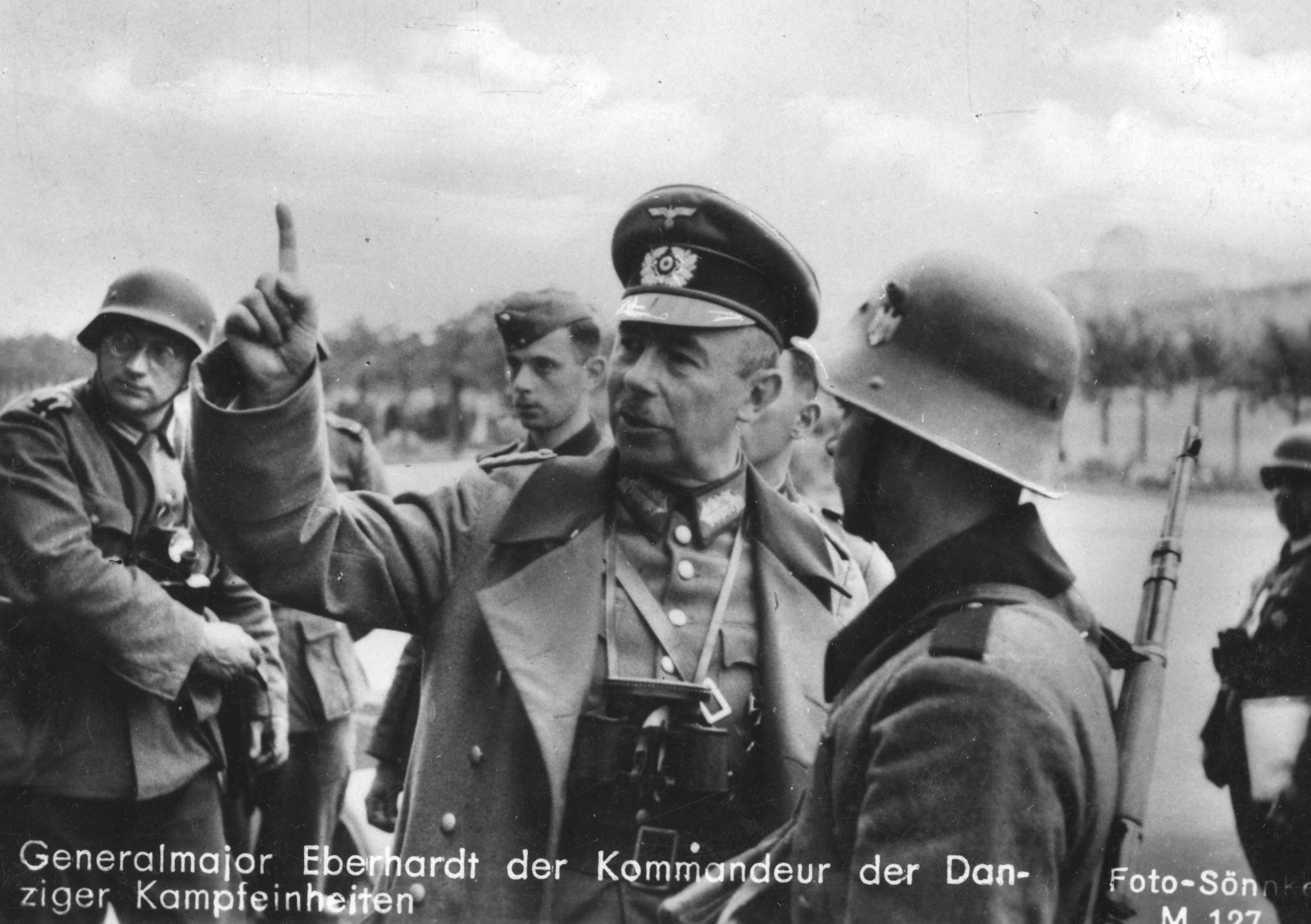
- Friedrich-Georg Eberhardt in 1939
- Born: 15 January 1892; Strasbourg
- Died: 9 September 1964 (aged 72); Wiesbaden
- Military career
- Allegiance: German Empire; Weimar Republic; Nazi Germany
- Branch: German Army
- Service years: 1910–1945
- Rank: Generalleutnant
- Commands: 60th Infantry Division; 38th Infantry Division; 286th Security Division
- Conflicts: World War I; World War II; Invasion of Poland; Defense of the Polish Post Office in Danzig; Battle of Westerplatte; Battle of France; Invasion of Yugoslavia; Battle of Greece; Operation Barbarossa; Battle of Kiev (1941); Battle of Rostov (1941); Second Battle of Kharkov; Lower Dnieper Offensive; Battle of Memel
- Awards: Knight's Cross of the Iron Cross

Friedrich-Georg Eberhardt (15 January 1892 – 9 September 1964) was a German Generalleutnant who commanded several divisions during World War II. He was awarded the Knight's Cross of the Iron Cross.

== History ==
In September 1939, he commanded the German forces in one of the opening battles of World War II, the Battle of Westerplatte.

He commanded the 60th Infantry Division, 38th Infantry Division, 174th Reserve Division, and 286th Security Division. He was sent four times to the Führerreserve.

From December 1944 on, he was judge at the Reichskriegsgericht under Roland Freisler. Friedrich-Georg Eberhardt was taken prisoner in May 1945 and was released in 1947.

He was a recipient of the Knight's Cross of the Iron Cross, the highest award in the military and paramilitary forces of Nazi Germany during World War II.

== Awards ==
- Knight's Cross of the Iron Cross on 31 December 1941 as Generalleutnant and commander of 60. Infanterie-Division (mot.)

Military offices
Preceded by Previously Gruppe Eberhardt	Commander of 60th Infantry Division; 1 September 1939 – 15 May 1942	Succeeded by Generalleutnant Otto Kohlermann
Preceded by None	Commander of 38th Infantry Division; 8 July 1942 – 24 August 1942	Succeeded by Generalmajor Knut Eberding
Preceded by Generalleutnant Kurt Renner	Commander of 174th Reserve Division; 15 September 1943 – 2 August 1944	Succeeded by None
Preceded by Generalleutnant Hans Oschmann	Commander of 286th Security Division; 5 August 1944 – 11 December 1944	Succeeded by None
