= Mikulec =

Mikulec is a Slavic surname. Notable people with the name include:

- Jindřich Mikulec (born 1928), Czech gymnast
- Roman Mikulec (born 1972), Slovak politician

== See also ==
- Mikuleč
