= XX Army Corps (Wehrmacht) =

- XX. Armeekorps
- Active: October 1940 – 8 May 1945
- Country: Nazi Germany
- Branch: Army
- Size: Corps
- Engagements: World War II: Operation Barbarossa; Battle of Białystok–Minsk; Battle of Smolensk (1941); Battle of Moscow; Battles of Rzhev; Battle of Kursk; Battle of Smolensk (1943); Operation Bagration; Lublin–Brest Offensive; East Prussian Offensive; Heiligenbeil Pocket

Commanders
- Notable commanders: Rudolf Freiherr von Roman

German XX. Corps (XX. Armeekorps) was a corps in the German Army during World War II.

== Commanders ==
- Infantry General (General der Infanterie) Friedrich Materna, October 1940 – 10 September 1942
- Artillery General (General der Artillerie) Rudolf Freiherr von Roman, 10 September 1942 – 14 February 1943
- Infantry General (General der Infanterie) Erwin Vierow, 14 February – 10 March 1943
- Artillery General (General der Artillerie) Rudolf Freiherr von Roman, 10 March – December 1943
- Infantry General (General der Infanterie) Edgar Röhricht, December 1943 – January 1944
- Artillery General (General der Artillerie) Rudolf Freiherr von Roman, January – 1 April 1945
- Cavalry General (General der Kavallerie) Carl-Erik Koehler, 1 April – 8 May 1945

== Area of operations ==
- Poland – October 1940 – June 1941
- Eastern Front, Central sector – June 1941 – April 1945
- Central Germany – April – May 1945

== See also ==
- List of German corps in World War II
