= Edgar Röhricht =

WW2 German Army general (1892-1967)

- Born: 16 June 1892
- Died: 11 February 1967 (aged 74)
- Military career
- Allegiance: German Empire; Weimar Republic; Nazi Germany
- Branch: German Army
- Service years: 1907–1920; 1935–1945
- Rank: General der Infanterie
- Commands: 95th Infantry Division; XX Army Corps; LIX Army Corps
- Conflicts: World War I; World War II; Battle of France; Battle of the Caucasus; Battle of Kursk; Hube's Pocket; Lvov–Sandomierz Offensive
- Awards: Knight's Cross of the Iron Cross

Edgar Röhricht (16 June 1892 – 11 February 1967) was a German general during World War II who commanded the LIX. corps. He was a recipient of the Knight's Cross of the Iron Cross. Röhricht was surrendered to the Allied troops in 1945 and was held until 1947.

== Awards and decorations ==
- Knight's Cross of the Iron Cross on 15 May 1944^{[a]} as Generalleutnant and commander of 95. Infanterie-Division

Military offices
Preceded by Generalleutnant Edward Aldrian	Commander of 95. Infanterie-Division; 3 October 1942 – September 1943	Succeeded by Generalmajor Gustav Gihr
Preceded by General der Artillerie Rudolf Freiherr von Roman	Commander of XX. Armeekorps; December 1943 – January 1944	Succeeded by General der Artillerie Rudolf Freiherr von Roman
Preceded by General der Infanterie Friedrich Schulz	Commander of LIX. Armeekorps; 21 March 1944 – 2 June 1944	Succeeded by Generalleutnant Friedrich-Wilhelm Müller
Preceded by Generalleutnant Friedrich-Wilhelm Müller	Commander of LIX. Armeekorps; 10 June 1944 – 29 January 1945	Succeeded by Generalleutnant Joachim von Tresckow
