= 60th Infantry Division (Wehrmacht) =

- 60. Infanterie-Division
- Active: 15 October 1939 – 27 May 1943
- Country: Nazi Germany
- Branch: Army
- Type: Infantry
- Size: Division
- Engagements: World War II: Battle of France; Invasion of Yugoslavia; Battle of Greece; Operation Barbarossa; Battle of Stalingrad

The 60th Infantry Division was formed in late 1939, from Gruppe Eberhardt, a collection of SA units that had been engaged in the capture of Danzig during the Invasion of Poland. This division was unusual in that its manpower was largely drawn from the SA and the police.

== History ==
The division participated in the invasion of France (1940) as part of the 1st Army. In July 1940, it was transferred back to Poland where it was upgraded to 60th Infantry Division (motorized). During this upgrading, it was reduced to two regiments (the Inf.Rgt 92 and Inf.Rgt 244); the other regiment (Inf.Rgt 243) was reassigned.

In January 1941, the division was moved to Romania and, in April, it took part in the invasion of Yugoslavia and Greece.

This division participated in Operation Barbarossa, advancing through Uman and across the Dnieper River as part of the 1st Panzergruppe (commanded by General Von Kleist). It took part in the attack and occupation of Rostov until it was pulled back along with other German troops to the Mius River. In a series of defensive battles during the winter of 1941–42, it managed to hold its position and then in March 1942 took part in the battles of Kharkov. Later in 1942, the division took part in the drive on Stalingrad. During the latter part of 1942, it was involved in the bitter battles for this city, and then in early 1943 was encircled at Stalingrad, and destroyed.

In mid-1943, the division was reformed as a panzergrenadier formation called Panzer-Grenadier-Division Feldherrnhalle, as a part of the Feldherrnhalle organisation. For more information, see also Panzerkorps Feldherrnhalle.

== Commanders ==
- Generalleutnant Friedrich-Georg Eberhardt (15 October 1939 - 15 May 1942)
- Generalleutnant Otto Kohlermann (15 May - November 1942)
- Generalmajor Hans-Adolf von Arenstorff (November 1942 - 2 January 1943) : POW

== Orders of Battle ==
=== 60. Infanterie-Division, May 1940 - Battle of France ===
- Division Stab
- Infanterie-Regiment 92
- Infanterie-Regiment 243
- Infanterie-Regiment 244
- Artillerie-Regiment 160

=== 60. Infanterie-Division (mot), August 1942 - Fall Blau ===
- Division Stab
- Infanterie-Regiment (mot) 92
- Infanterie-Regiment (mot) 120
- Kradschützen-Bataillon 160
- Panzerjäger-Abteilung 160
- Aufklärungs-Abteilung 160
- Artillerie-Regiment 160
- Nachrichten-Abteilung 160
- Pionier-Battalion (mot) 160

== See also ==
- Panzerkorps Feldherrnhalle
- 13.Panzer-Division
- Panzergrenadier, Panzer, Panzer Division
- Division (military), Military unit
- Wehrmacht, List of German divisions in World War II
