= Fritz Schlieper =

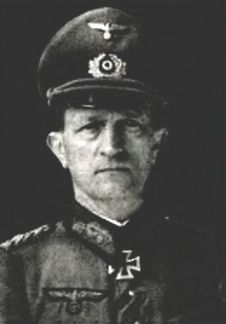
- Fritz Schlieper
- Born: 4 August 1892; Koldromb, Posen
- Died: 4 June 1977 (aged 84); Nuremberg, West Germany
- Relatives: Franz Schlieper (brother)
- Military career
- Allegiance: German Empire (to 1918); Weimar Republic (to 1933); Nazi Germany
- Branch: Army
- Service years: 1911–1945
- Rank: Generalleutnant
- Commands: 45. Infanterie-Division
- Conflicts: World War I World War II
- Awards: Knight's Cross of the Iron Cross

Fritz Schlieper (4 August 1892 – 4 June 1977) was a Nazi German military officer who served during World War I and World War II, eventually gaining the rank of Generalleutnant.

== Life and Nazi activities ==
Fritz Schlieper was born 4 August 1892 in Koldromb, Posen. In 1911, he joined the German Army. After the First World War, Schlieper continued to serve in the Weimar Republic's Reichswehr and when the Weimar Republic was replaced by Nazi Germany, he remained in the Heer component of the Wehrmacht and from 1935 to 1939 commanded the 17th Artillery Regiment. In 1939, he was promoted to Generalmajor and served as Chief of Staff for Military District XIII and during the Invasion of Poland, served as the Chief of Staff for Frontier Sector Center. From 1939 to 1940, he was also the Quartermaster for the 18th Army.

During Operation Barbarossa, he commanded the 45th Infantry Division in one of the initial battles, the Defense of Brest Fortress. For his part in these battles, he would be awarded the Knight's Cross of the Iron Cross. In 1942, he was transferred to Slovakia to lead Nazi German military mission at Slovak Ministry of Defence. He was released from his position after conflict with Minister General Ferdinand Čatloš. From 1944 until the war's end, he was the Chief of Special Staff II. After the war, Schlieper lived in Nürnberg until his death on 4 June 1977.

== Awards ==
- Iron Cross (1914)
  - 2nd class
  - 1st Class
- Honour Cross of the World War 1914/1918
- Clasp to the Iron Cross (1939)
  - 2nd Class
  - 1st Class
- Knight's Cross of the Iron Cross on 27 December 1941 as Generalmajor and commander of the 45. Infanterie-Division
- Eastern Medal (1942)

Military offices
| Preceded by Generalmajor Gerhard Körner | Commander of 45. Infanterie-Division; 27 April 1941 – 27 February 1942 | Succeeded by Generalleutnant Fritz Kühlwein |
