= Dvorce (Bruntál District) =

- Municipality
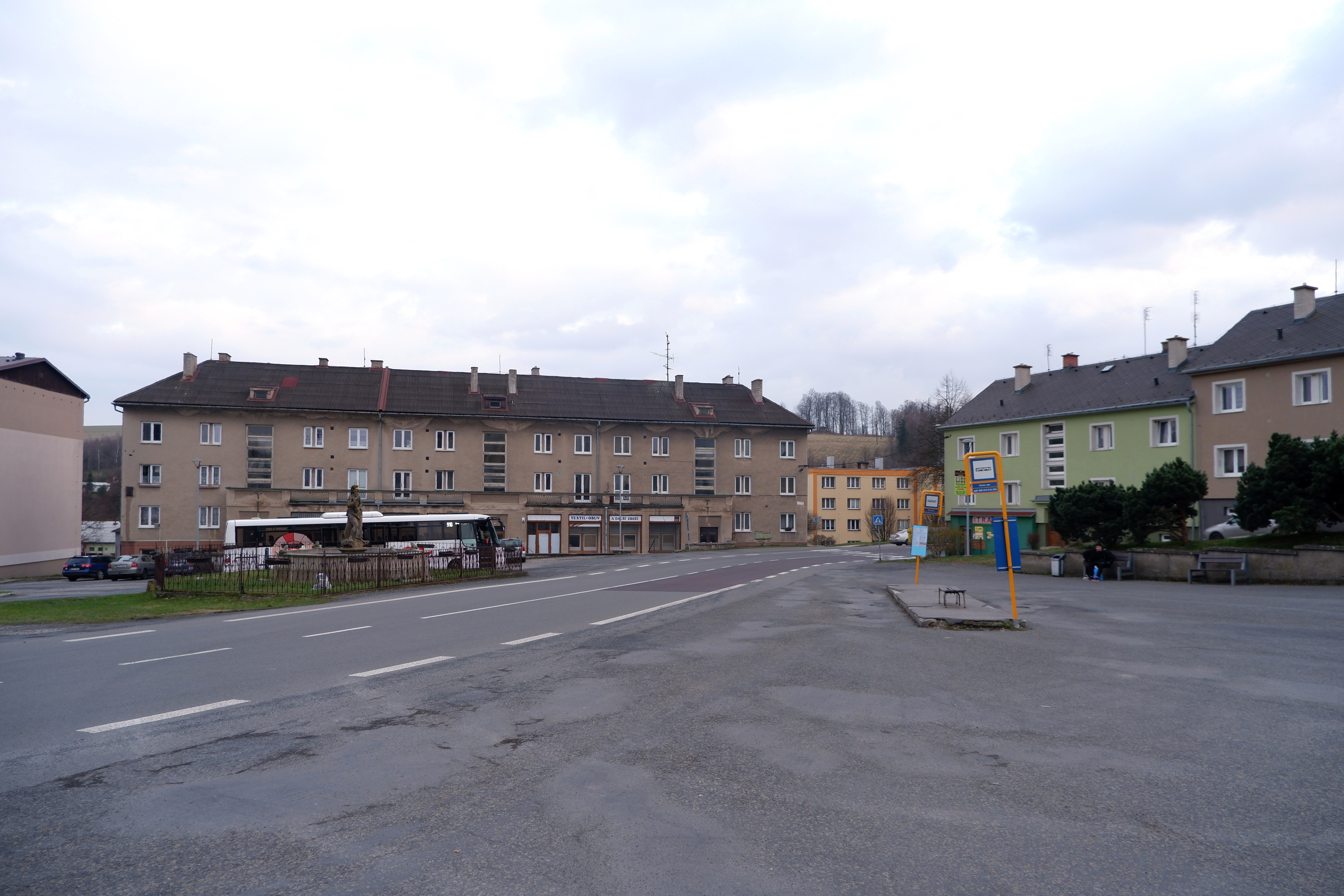
- Centre of Dvorce

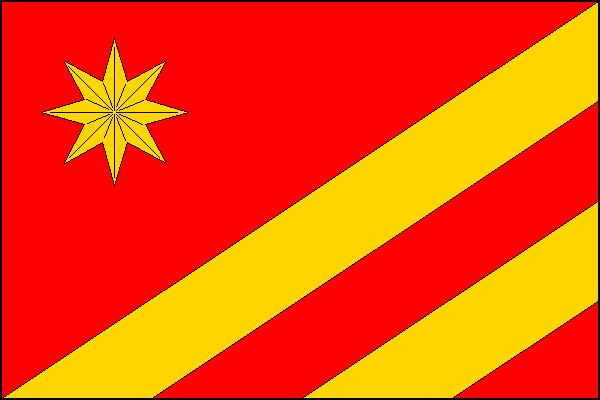
- Flag Coat of arms

- Location in the Czech Republic
- Coordinates: 49°50′0″N 17°32′52″E
- Country: Czech Republic
- Region: Moravian-Silesian
- District: Bruntál
- First mentioned: 1339

Area
  - Total: 24.20 km^{2} (9.34 sq mi)
- Elevation: 552 m (1,811 ft)

Population (2026-01-01)
  - Total: 1,212
  - Density: 50.08/km^{2} (129.7/sq mi)
- Time zone: UTC+1 (CET)
  - Summer (DST): UTC+2 (CEST)
- Postal code: 793 68
- Website: www.obecdvorce.cz

Dvorce (in 1869–1910 Dvorec; German: Hof in Mähren) is a municipality and village in Bruntál District in the Moravian-Silesian Region of the Czech Republic. It has about 1,200 inhabitants.

== Administrative division ==
Dvorce consists of two municipal parts (in brackets population according to the 2021 census):

- Dvorce (1,218)
- Rejchartice (5)

== Etymology ==
The name Dvorce is a plural diminutive form of the Czech word dvůr ('courtyard', 'farmyard').

== Geography ==
Dvorce is located about 18 kilometres (11 mi) south of Bruntál. It lies in the Nízký Jeseník range. The highest point is the hill Červený kopec at 693 m (2,274 ft) above sea level. The Lobník Stream flows through the municipality.

== History ==
According to legends, Dvorce was founded at the beginning of the 10th century, however the first written mention of Dvorce is from 1339. In 1363 Dvorce was first referred to as a market town and in 1406 it is referred to as a town. The first written mention of Rejhartice is from 1410.

In 1938, after the Munich Agreement, the town was annexed by Nazi Germany and administered as a part of the Reichsgau Sudetenland. The German-speaking population was expelled in 1945 according to the Beneš decrees and was replaced by Czech settlers.

The municipality of Dvorce lost the town status in 1945.

== Demographics ==
Historical population

Year	Pop.	±%
1869	3,433	—
1880	3,207	−6.6%
1890	3,059	−4.6%
1900	2,905	−5.0%
1910	2,534	−12.8%

Year	Pop.	±%
1921	2,538	+0.2%
1930	2,692	+6.1%
1950	1,328	−50.7%
1961	1,556	+17.2%
1970	1,505	−3.3%

Year	Pop.	±%
1980	1,660	+10.3%
1991	1,549	−6.7%
2001	1,558	+0.6%
2011	1,370	−12.1%
2021	1,223	−10.7%

Source: Censuses

== Transport ==
The I/46 road from Olomouc to Opava runs through the municipality.

== Sights ==
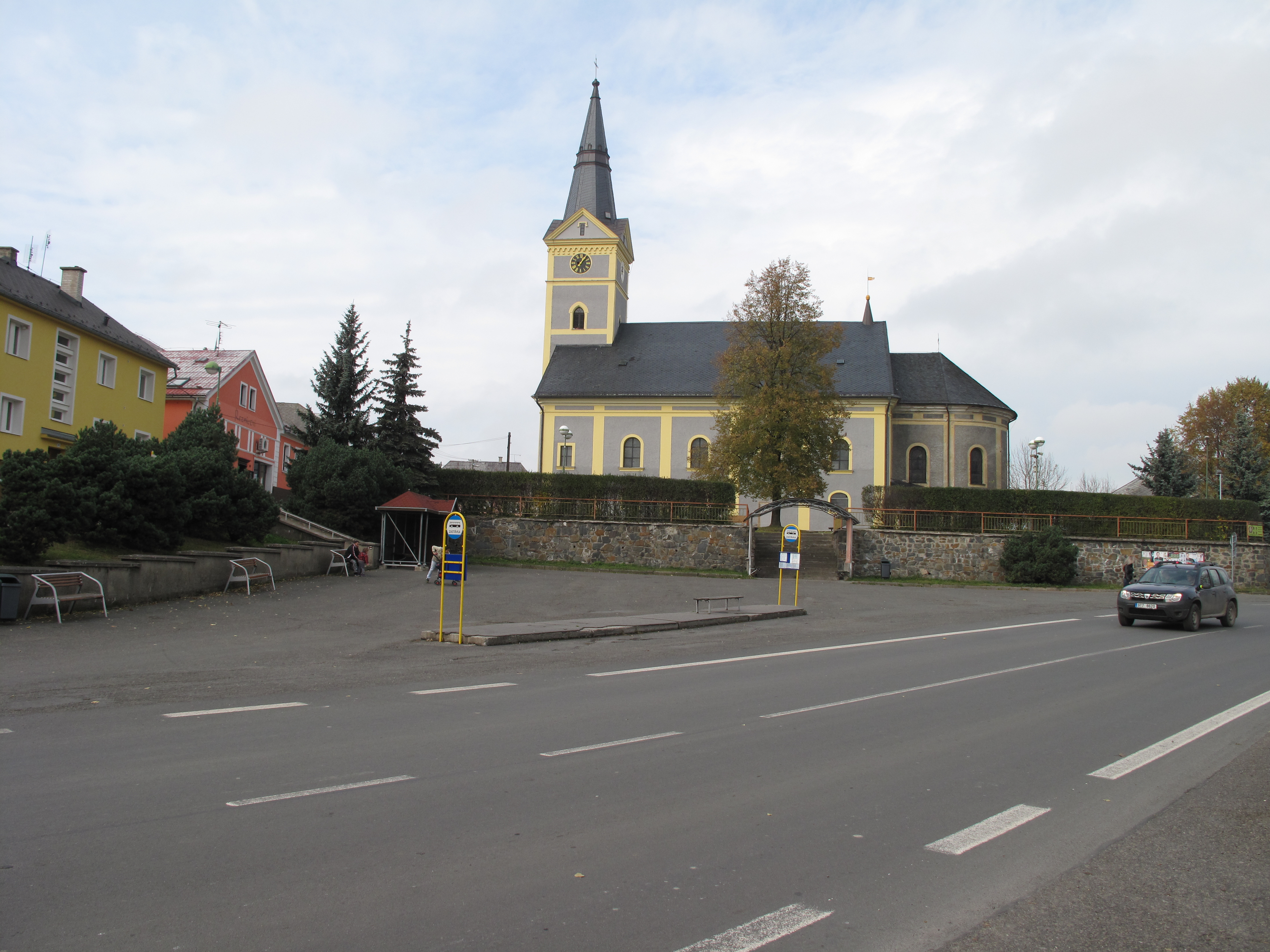
Church of Saint Giles

The main landmark of Dvorce is the Church of Saint Giles. It was built in the Neoclassical style in 1752–1753 on the site of an older church and modified after 1834. The tower dates from the second half of the 16th century.

== Notable people ==
- Wilhelm Jahn (1835–1900), Austrian conductor
- Friedrich Materna (1885–1946), German general

== Twin towns – sister cities ==
Dvorce is twinned with:

- Strzeleczki, Poland
