= Ludwig Merker =

Nazi Germany general (1894–1964)

- Born: 1 September 1894
- Died: 14 March 1964 (aged 69)
- Military career
- Allegiance: Nazi Germany
- Branch: Army
- Rank: Generalleutnant
- Commands: 35th Infantry Division
- Conflicts: World War II
- Awards: Knight's Cross of the Iron Cross

Ludwig Merker (1 September 1894 – 14 March 1964) was a German general in the Wehrmacht during World War II. He was a recipient of the Knight's Cross of the Iron Cross of Nazi Germany.

== Awards and decorations ==
- Knight's Cross of the Iron Cross on 18 November 1941 as Oberst and commander of 215th Infantry Regiment.

Military offices
Preceded by General der Artillerie Rudolf Freiherr von Roman	Commander of 35th Infantry Division; 10 September 1942 – April 1943	Succeeded by Generalleutnant Otto Drescher
Preceded by Generalleutnant Otto Drescher	Commander of 35th Infantry Division; 8 June 1943 – 5 November 1943	Succeeded by Generalleutnant Johann-Georg Richert
