= Kołdrąb, Kuyavian-Pomeranian Voivodeship =

Kołdrąb
- Village
- Location within Poland
- Coordinates: 52°44′N 17°35′E
- Country: Poland
- Voivodeship: Kuyavian-Pomeranian
- County: Żnin
- Gmina: Janowiec Wielkopolski

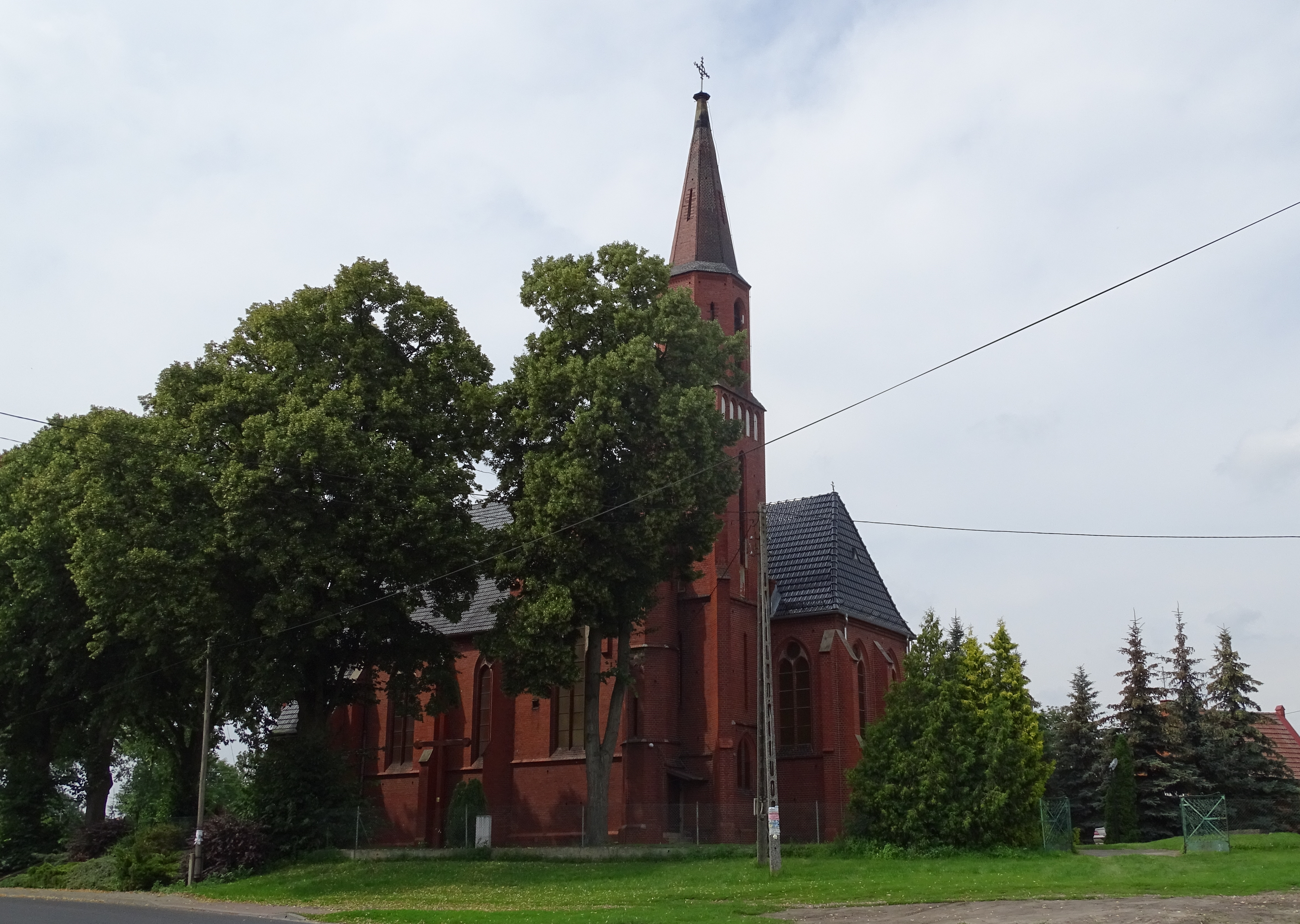
Church of John the Baptist, built in the last years of the 19th century.

Kołdrąb [ˈkɔu̯drɔmp] is a village in the administrative district of Gmina Janowiec Wielkopolski, within Żnin County, Kuyavian-Pomeranian Voivodeship, in north-central Poland.

== Notable residents ==
- Fritz Schlieper (1892–1977), German general
