= 45th Infantry Division (Wehrmacht) =

- German: 45. Infanterie-Division
- Insignia of the 45th Infantry Division
- Active: 1 April 1938 – 8 May 1945
- Country: Nazi Germany
- Branch: Army
- Type: Infantry (1938-1944); Volksgrenadier (1944-1945)
- Size: Division
- Engagements: World War II

Commanders
- Notable commanders: Friedrich Materna

The 45th Infantry Division (German: 45. Infanterie-Division) was an infantry division of the army of Nazi Germany during World War II. Towards the end of the war, the division was reassembled into a second iteration, the 45th Volksgrenadier Division (45. Volksgrenadier-Division)

== History ==
=== 45th Infantry Division ===
With the annexation of Austria in 1938 by Nazi Germany, what was once the 4th Austrian Division was incorporated into the Wehrmacht (German Army) and re-designated the 45th Infantry Division. In the 1939 Invasion of Poland, the division was on the right wing of Gerd von Rundstedt's Army Group South.

On 22 June 1941, the 45th Infantry Division began Operation Barbarossa by starting the 9-day long siege of the Brest Fortress. In March 1942 the Red Army defeated the division at Livny, Russia and captured the archive of the division. That was the first time the Red Army learned about the defense of the Brest Fortress It suffered heavy casualties during the Battle of Kursk. It was rebuilt but virtually destroyed at Bobruysk in June 1944 during Operation Bagration.

=== 45th Volksgrenadier Division ===
The destroyed 45th Division was again rebuilt as the "45th Volksgrenadier Division" in the autumn of 1944 in Poland, by renaming the short-lived 546th Grenadier Division (546. Grenadier-Division), which was then still in formation. On 1 January, the division (then under 9th Army of Army Group A) had a strength of 10,118 men. The division fought at Warsaw and Radom in 1945, retreating through Silesia to Koniggratz, and finally to Czechoslovakia, where it surrendered.

== Commanding officers ==
- General der Infanterei Friedrich Materna (1 April 1938 – 1 October 1940)
- Generalmajor Gerhard Körner, (25 October 1940 – 27 April 1941)
- Generalleutnant Fritz Schlieper, (27 April 1941 – 27 February 1942)
- Generalleutnant Fritz Kühlwein, (27 February 1942 – 25 April 1943)
- Generalleutnant Hans Freiherr von Falkenstein, (25 April 1943 – 30 November 1943)
- Generalmajor Joachim Engel, (30 November 1943 – 27 February 1944)
- Generalmajor Gustav Gihr, (27 February 1944 – 9 April 1944)
- Generalmajor Joachim Engel, (9 April 1944 – ? June 1944)
- Generalmajor Richard Daniel, (19 July 1944 – March 1945)
- Generalmajor Erich Hassenstein, (March 1945 – 2 May 1945)

== Order of battle ==
=== 1939 ===
- Infantry Regiment 130
- Infantry Regiment 133
- Infantry Regiment 135
- Reconnaissance Detachment 45
- Artillery Regiment 98
- I Detachment
- II Detachment
- III Detachment
- I/Artillery Regiment 99
- Engineer Battalion 81
- Anti-Tank Detachment 45
- Signal Detachment 65
- Field Replacement Battalion 45
- Supply Unit 45

=== 1942 ===
- Grenadier Regiment 130
- Grenadier Regiment 133
- Grenadier Regiment 135
- Bicycle Detachment 45
- Artillery Regiment 98
- I Detachment
- II Detachment
- III Detachment
- I/Artillery Regiment 99
- Engineer Battalion 81
- Panzerjäger Detachment 45
- Signal Detachment 65
- Field Replacement Battalion 45
- Supply Unit 45

=== 1943–1944 ===
- Grenadier Regiment 130
- Grenadier Regiment 133
- Grenadier Regiment 135
- Fusilier Battalion 45
- Artillery Regiment 98
- I Detachment
- II Detachment
- III Detachment
- I/Artillery Regiment 99
- Engineer Battalion 81
- Panzerjäger Detachment 45
- Signal Detachment 65
- Field Replacement Battalion 45 (2)
- Supply Unit 45
