= Wilhelm Jahn =

Austrian conductor (1835–1900)

Wilhelm Jahn

Wilhelm Jahn (24 November 1835 in Dvorce – 21 April 1900 in Vienna) was an Austrian conductor.

== Life ==
Jahn served as director of the Vienna Court Opera from 1880 to 1897 and principal conductor of the Vienna Philharmonic Orchestra from 1882 to 1883.

He gave the partial premiere of Bruckner's Symphony No. 6, performing the middle two movements in 1883. in 1892 he conducted the world premiere of Jules Massenet's Werther in Vienna.
