= Günther Pape =

German general (1907–1986)

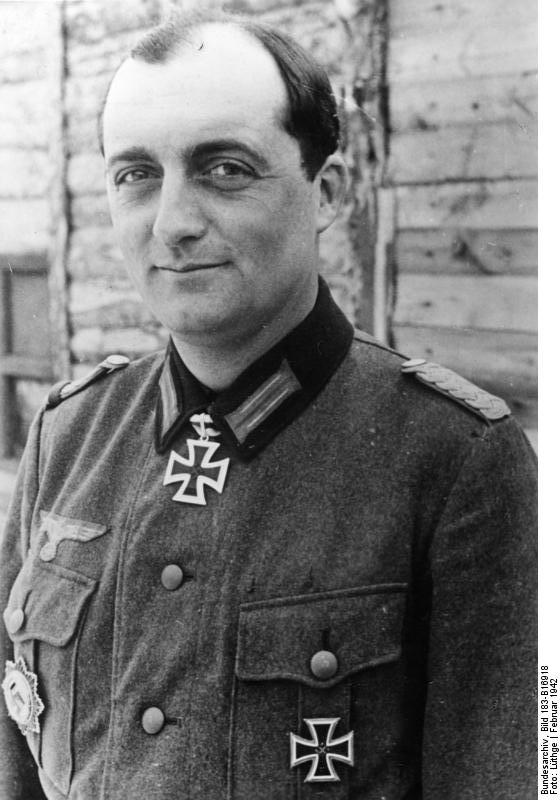
- Born: 14 July 1907; Düsseldorf, Rhine Province, Kingdom of Prussia, German Empire
- Died: 21 January 1986 (aged 78); Düsseldorf, North Rhine-Westphalia, West Germany
- Relatives: ∞ 19 July 1935 Gertrud Ottomeyer; 2 daughters
- Military career
- Allegiance: Weimar Republic; Nazi Germany; West Germany
- Branch: Reichsheer; German Army; German Army
- Service years: 1927–45; 1956–66
- Rank: Generalmajor
- Commands: Panzer-Grenadier-Division Feldherrnhalle; 5th Panzer Division (Bundeswehr)
- Conflicts: World War II
- Awards: Knight's Cross of the Iron Cross with Oak Leaves

Günther Hans Pape (14 July 1907 – 21 January 1986) was a German general during World War II. He was a recipient of the Knight's Cross of the Iron Cross with Oak Leaves of Nazi Germany.

Following World War II, Pape served in the Bundeswehr of West Germany. The force underwent a series of internal discussion and controversies which led to the "Generalkrise" (Crisis of the generals) in August 1966. Among other issues, the discussion was centered about the inner leadership of the Bundeswehr and the hierarchy of command between the Federal Ministry of Defence and the armed forces. The Inspector of the Luftwaffe General Werner Panitzki and Minister of Defence Kai-Uwe von Hassel resigned on 12 August 1966. Inspector General of the Bundeswehr General Heinrich Trettner resigned the next day followed shortly by Pape, who resigned out of loyalty to his commanding officers.

== Promotions ==
- 1 April 1927 Offizieranwärter (Officer Candidate)
- 1 February 1932 Leutnant (2nd Lieutenant)
- 1 November 1933 Oberleutnant (1st Lieutenant)
- 1 March 1938 Hauptmann (Captain)
  - 1 April 1941 received new and improved Rank Seniority (RDA) from 1 October 1936
- 1 September 1941 Major
  - 20 June 1942 received new and improved Rank Seniority (RDA) from 1 November 1940
- 30 September 1942 Oberstleutnant (Lieutenant Colonel) without RDA
  - 16 November 1942 received RDA from 1 November 1942
- 30 April 1943 Oberst (Colonel) with RDA from 1 March 1943
- 1 December 1944 Generalmajor (Major General)

=== Bundeswehr ===
- 1 November 1956 Brigadegeneral (Brigadier General; one-star General)
- 1 October 1960 Generalmajor (Major General; two-star general)

== Awards and decorations ==
- DRA/German Gymnastics and Sports Badge in Bronze
- Wehrmacht Long Service Award, 4th and 3rd Class
  - 4th Class on 2 October 1936
  - 3rd Class in April 1939
- Sudetenland Medal with the “Prague Castle” clasp
- Iron Cross (1939), 2nd and 1st Class
  - 2nd Class on 25 September 1939
  - 1st Class on 16 June 1940
- Panzer Battle Badge in Bronze on 16 October 1940
- Winter Battle in the East 1941–42 Medal on 15 August 1942
- Wound Badge (1939) in Silver
- German Cross in Gold on 23 January 1942 as Major in Krad-Schützen-Bataillon 3
- Knight's Cross of the Iron Cross with Oak Leaves
  - Knight's Cross on 10 February 1942 as Major and Commander of Krad-Schützen-Bataillon 3
  - 301st Oak Leaves on 15 September 1943 as Oberst and Commander of Panzergrenadier-Regiment 394
- Honour Roll Clasp of the Army on 5 December 1944 as Generalmajor and Commander of the Panzer-Grenadier-Division Feldherrnhalle
- Mentioned by name in the supplement to the Wehrmachtbericht on 20 December 1944
  - "In the Budapest sector, during the fierce defensive battles, the Panzergrenadier Division 'Feldherrnhalle'—under the command of Major General Pape—and the 13th Panzer Division—under the command of Major General Schmidhuber (whose officers, non-commissioned officers, and enlisted men were drawn predominantly from the SA)—distinguished themselves through outstanding bravery and offensive vigor."
- Order of Merit of the Federal Republic of Germany, Commander's Cross (Großes Verdienstkreuz, Great Cross of Merit) in 1967

Military offices
Preceded by Generalmajor Friedrich-Carl von Steinkeller	Commander of Panzer-Grenadier-Division Feldherrnhalle; Commander of Panzer-Division Feldherrnhalle (1); 8 July 1944 – 8 May 1945	Succeeded by None
Preceded by Generalmajor Heinrich Baron von Behr	Commander of 5. Panzer-Division (Bundeswehr); 1 April 1960 – 30 June 1962	Succeeded by Generalmajor Albert Schnez
