= Friedrich Materna =

- Born: 21 June 1885; Hof, Moravia
- Died: 11 November 1946 (aged 61); Vienna, Austria
- Military career
- Allegiance: Austria-Hungary (to 1918); First Austrian Republic (to 1938); Nazi Germany
- Branch: Bundesheer; Wehrmacht
- Service years: 1904–1938 (Austria); 1938–1944 (Germany)
- Rank: Generalmajor (Austria); General der Infanterie (Germany)
- Commands: 45th Infantry Division; XX Corps
- Conflicts: World War I; World War II
- Awards: Knight's Cross of the Iron Cross

Friedrich Materna (21 June 1885 – 11 November 1946) was a general in the Bundesheer (Austrian Federal Army) in the 1930s and the German Wehrmacht during the World War II.

He became a general-major in the Austrian army in 1935, and he was also a part of the Bundesministerium für Landesverteidigung (Federal Ministry of Defence), in which he acted as Head of the Training Department.

After the Anschluss he was incorporated into the Wehrmacht, where from 1938 to 1940, he commanded the 45. Infanterie-Division. Between 1940 and 1942, he commanded the XX Armeekorps, and from 1942 to 1943, the Military District XVII.

Between 1943 and 1944, he was held in reserve, and, in 1944, he retired from the Army.

He died in 1946.

== Awards ==
- Iron Cross (1939) 2nd and 1st Class
- German Cross in Gold (15 December 1942)
- Knight's Cross of the Iron Cross on 5 August 1940 as Generalleutnant and commander of the 45. Infanterie-Division

Military offices
Preceded by —	Commander of 45. Infanterie-Division; 1 April 1938 – 25 October 1940	Succeeded by Generalmajor Gerhard Körner
Preceded by —	Commander of XX. Armeekorps; October 1940 – 10 September 1942	Succeeded by General der Artillerie Rudolf Freiherr von Roman
