= Panzer-Grenadier-Division Feldherrnhalle =

Panzergrenadier Division Feldherrnhalle Panzer-Division Feldherrnhalle Panzer-Division Feldherrnhalle 1
- Active: 20 June 1943 – May 1945
- Country: Nazi Germany
- Branch: Army
- Type: Panzergrenadier
- Role: Armoured warfare
- Size: Division
- Engagements: World War II; Operation Achse; Eastern Front; Battle of Narva; Mogilev offensive; Minsk offensive; Battle of Debrecen; Battle of Budapest

Commanders
- Notable commanders: Günther Pape

The Panzergrenadier Division Feldherrnhalle, was a semi-armoured formation of the German Army during World War II.

== History ==
The Panzergrenadier Division "Feldherrnhalle" was created on 20 June 1943 in the south of France by the renaming and reorganization of the 60th Infantry Division which had been destroyed at Stalingrad. Most of the recruits had previously been members of the SA or had undergone a training course in one of the twelve "Sturm Banners" scattered throughout the Reich. The name "Feldherrnhalle" was used by the original infantry regiment 271 or its 3rd Battalion. The name refers to the Field Marshals' Hall in Munich, site of combat in the 1923 Beer Hall Putsch.

During the division's formation, it was stationed in the Nimes–Montpellier area. At the beginning of September 1943, the division took part in the disarmament of the 8th Italian Army as part of Operation Achse. At the end of October 1943, the division moved to northern France to the Arras-Doullens area and at the beginning of December 1943 to the Eastern Front.

Here it took up defensive positions as part of the 3rd Panzer Army in the area of Vitebsk. In February it was sent to the North to fight in the Battle of Narva. In May 1944, it returned to Army Group Centre and fought against the Soviet Mogilev Offensive in June. The division was destroyed during the Soviet Minsk Offensive in July 1944, as part of Operation Bagration.

=== Panzer-Division Feldherrnhalle ===
The Division was recreated on 1 September 1944 in Warthelager and then in Hungary in the Debrecen area.

On 27 November 1944, the division was renamed Panzer-Division Feldherrnhalle and again destroyed during the Battle of Budapest in February 1945.

The division was recreated again as Panzer-Division Feldherrnhalle 1.

The remnants of the division surrendered to the Soviets in May 1945 at Německý Brod.

== Commanders ==
=== Panzergrenadier Division Feldherrnhalle ===
No.	Portrait	Commander	Took office	Left office	Time in office
1	Otto Kohlermann	Generalleutnant; Otto Kohlermann (1896–1984)	27 May 1943	13 February 1944	262 days
2	Albert Henze	Oberst; Albert Henze (1894–1979)	13 February 1944	3 April 1944	50 days
3	Friedrich-Carl von Steinkeller	Generalmajor; Friedrich-Carl von Steinkeller (1896–1981)	3 April 1944	8 July 1944 (POW)	96 days
4	Günther Pape	Generalmajor; Günther Pape (1907–1986)	8 July 1944	27 November 1944	142 days

=== Panzer Division Feldherrnhalle (1) ===
No.	Portrait	Commander	Took office	Left office	Time in office
1	Günther Pape	Generalmajor; Günther Pape (1907–1986)	27 November 1944	8 May 1945	162 days

== Composition Panzergrenadier-Division Feldherrnhalle, June 1943 ==
- Division Staff
- Rifle-Regiment Feldherrnhalle
- Grenadier-Regiment Feldherrnhalle
- Panzer-Detachment Feldherrnhalle
- Panzer-Reconnaissance-Detachment Feldherrnhalle
- Artillery Regiment Feldherrnhalle
- FlaK-Battalion Feldherrnhalle
- Pioneer-Battalion Feldherrnhalle
- Communications-Company Feldherrnhalle

== Sources ==
- "Panzer-Grenadier-Division Feldherrnhalle". Lexikon der Wehrmacht (in German).
- "Panzergrenadier-Division "Feldherrnhalle"". Oberkommando Heeres (in German).
- "Panzergrenadier-Division Feldherrnhalle". Axis History.
- "Panzer-Division "Feldherrnhalle"". Feldgrau.
