= Rudolf Freiherr von Roman =

German general

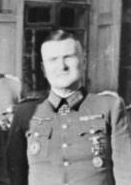
- Born: 19 November 1893
- Died: 18 February 1970 (aged 76)
- Military career
- Allegiance: German Empire; Weimar Republic; Nazi Germany
- Branch: German Army
- Service years: 1912–1945
- Rank: General der Artillerie
- Commands: 35th Infantry Division; XX Army Corps; LXIV Army Corps
- Conflicts: World War I; World War II; Invasion of Poland; Battle of France; Operation Barbarossa; Battle of Uman; Battle of Kiev (1941); Battle of Moscow; Battle of Kursk; Battle of Smolensk (1943); Operation Bagration; East Prussian Offensive; Heiligenbeil Pocket
- Awards: Knight's Cross of the Iron Cross with Oak Leaves

Rudolf Freiherr von Roman (19 November 1893 – 18 February 1970) was a German general (General of the Artillery) who commanded several corps during World War II. He was recipient of the Knight's Cross of the Iron Cross with Oak Leaves.

== Awards and decorations ==
- Iron Cross (1914) 2nd Class (5 September 1914) & 1st Class (14 August 1916)
- Clasp to the Iron Cross (1939) 2nd Class (18 September 1939) & 1st Class (1 December 1939)
- German Cross in Gold on 19 December 1941 as Generalmajor and Arko 3
- Knight's Cross of the Iron Cross with Oak Leaves
  - Knight's Cross on 19 February 1942 as Generalmajor and commander of 35. Infanterie-Division
  - 313th Oak Leaves on 28 October 1943 as General der Artillerie and commander of XX. Armeekorps

Military offices
Preceded by General der Infanterie Walther Fischer von Weikersthal	Commander of 35. Infanterie Division; 1 December 1941 – 10 September 1942	Succeeded by Generalleutnant Ludwig Merker
Preceded by General der Infanterie Friedrich Materna	Commander of XX. Armeekorps; 10 September 1942 – 14 February 1943	Succeeded by General der Infanterie Erwin Vierow
Preceded by General der Infanterie Erwin Vierow	Commander of LV. Armeekorps; 14 February 1943 - 10 March 1943	Succeeded by General der Infanterie Erich Jaschke
Preceded by General der Infanterie Erwin Vierow	Commander of XX. Armeekorps; 10 March 1943 – December 1943	Succeeded by General der Infanterie Edgar Röhricht
Preceded by General der Infanterie Edgar Röhricht	Commander of XX. Armeekorps; January 1944 – 1 April 1945	Succeeded by General der Kavallerie Carl-Erik Koehler
Preceded by Generalleutnant Helmut Friebe	Commander of LXIV. Armeekorps; April 1945 – 8 May 1945	Succeeded by None
