= Otto Kohlermann =

WW2 German army general (1896-1984)

- Born: 17 February 1896; Magdeburg, Province of Saxony, Kingdom of Prussia, German Empire
- Died: 27 February 1984 (aged 88); Augsburg, Bavaria, West Germany
- Military career
- Allegiance: German Empire; Weimar Republic; Nazi Germany
- Branch: German Army
- Rank: Generalleutnant
- Commands: 60th Infantry Division; Panzer-Grenadier-Division Feldherrnhalle
- Conflicts: World War II
- Awards: Knight's Cross of the Iron Cross

Otto Kohlermann (17 February 1896 – 27 February 1984) was a German general (Generalleutnant) in the Wehrmacht during World War II. He was a recipient of the Knight's Cross of the Iron Cross of Nazi Germany.

== Awards ==
- Knight's Cross of the Iron Cross on 22 February 1942 as Oberst and commander of ARKO 129

Military offices
Preceded by Generalleutnant Friedrich-Georg Eberhardt	Commander of 60. Infanterie-Division; 15 May 1942 - November 1942	Succeeded by Generalmajor Hans-Adolf von Arenstorff
Preceded by None	Commander of Panzer-Grenadier-Division Feldherrnhalle; June 1943 - 13 February 1944	Succeeded by Oberst Albert Henze
