= Johann-Heinrich Eckhardt =

German general (1896–1945)

- Born: 3 December 1896; Felsberg, Hesse
- Died: 15 May 1945 (aged 48); Winterberg
- Military career
- Allegiance: German Empire (to 1918); Weimar Republic (to 1933); Nazi Germany
- Branch: Imperial German Army; Reichswehr; Army (Wehrmacht)
- Service years: 1914–1945
- Rank: Generalleutnant
- Commands: 211th Infantry Division
- Conflicts: World War I World War II
- Awards: Knight's Cross of the Iron Cross with Oak Leaves

Johann-Heinrich Eckhardt (3 December 1896 – 15 May 1945) was born in Melsungen in Prussia in 1896 and entered the Imperial German Army on the outbreak of World War I. He was wounded, attended officer training courses and fought as a junior officer on both the western and eastern fronts. By the end of the war, he had been awarded the Iron Cross, 1st and 2nd class, the House Order of Hohenzollern and the Hanseatic Cross of Hamburg. He remained in the peacetime Reichswehr and served as a German general in the Wehrmacht during World War II. He was a recipient of the Knight's Cross of the Iron Cross with Oak Leaves of Nazi Germany. Eckhardt surrendered to the American troops on 8 May 1945 and died in custody on 15 May 1945.

== Awards and decorations ==
- Iron Cross (1914) 2nd Class (20 October 1915) & 1st Class (2 March 1917)
- Clasp to the Iron Cross (1939) 2nd Class (17 October 1939) & 1st Class (29 May 1940)
- German Cross in Gold on 25 January 1942 as Oberst in Jäger-Regiment 38
- Knight's Cross of the Iron Cross with Oak Leaves
  - Knight's Cross on 20 May 1942 as Oberst and commander of Jäger-Regiment 38
  - 644th Oak Leaves on 3 November 1944 as Generalleutnant and commander of 211. Infanterie-Division

Military offices
Preceded by Generalleutnant Richard Müller	Commander of 211. Infanterie-Division; 17 July 1943 - 8 May 1945	Succeeded by None
