= Richard Daniel =

- Born: 24 December 1900
- Died: 4 May 1986 (aged 85)
- Military career
- Allegiance: German Empire (to 1918); Weimar Republic (to 1919); Nazi Germany
- Branch: Army (Wehrmacht)
- Service years: 1916–1919; 1935–1945
- Rank: Generalmajor
- Commands: 45th Volksgrenadier Division
- Conflicts: World War II
- Awards: Knight's Cross of the Iron Cross with Oak Leaves

Richard Daniel (24 December 1900 – 4 May 1986) was a general in the Wehrmacht of Nazi Germany during World War II. He was a recipient of the Knight's Cross of the Iron Cross with Oak Leaves.

== Awards and decorations ==
- Iron Cross (1939) 2nd Class (12 July 1941) & 1st Class (28 July 1941)
- Honour Roll Clasp of the Army (25 February 1945)
- German Cross in Gold on 2 June 1943 as Oberst in Grenadier-Regiment 391
- Knight's Cross of the Iron Cross with Oak Leaves
  - Knight's Cross on 25 July 1942 as Oberstleutnant and commander of Infanterie-Regiment 391
  - (857th) Oak Leaves on 30 April 1945 as Generalmajor and commander of 45. Volksgrenadier-Division (Note: The sequential numbers greater than 843 for the Knight's Cross of the Iron Cross with Oak Leaves are unofficial and were assigned by the Association of Knight's Cross Recipients (AKCR) and are therefore denoted in parentheses.)
