= Richard Müller (general) =

German WWII general

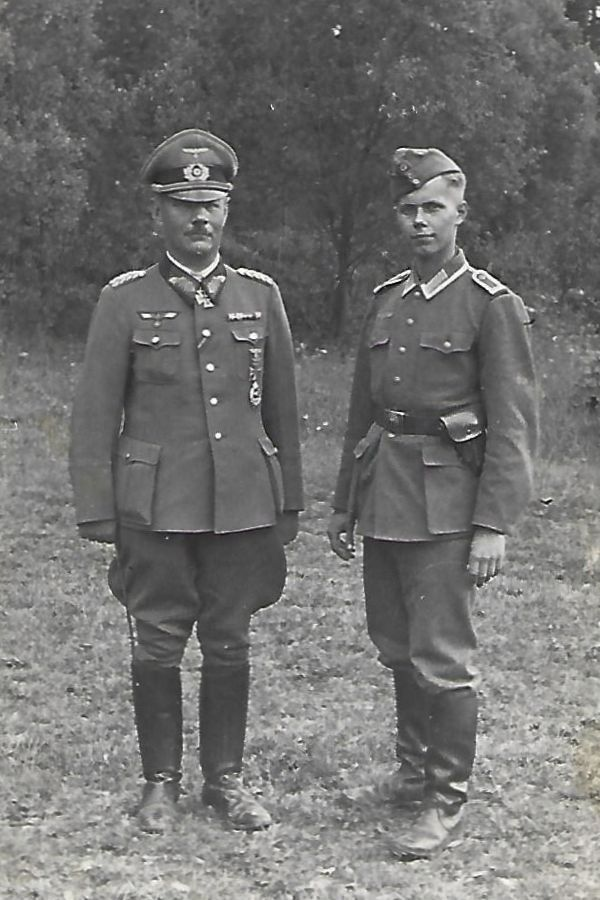
- Generalleutnant Richard Müller (left), together with his son, Hansi Müller, who fell on July 4, 1944, holding the rank of lieutenant.
- Born: 4 November 1891
- Died: 16 July 1943 (aged 51); Oryol, Soviet Union
- Military career
- Allegiance: German Empire; Weimar Republic; Nazi Germany
- Branch: Army
- Service years: 1911–1945
- Rank: Generalleutnant
- Commands: 211th Infantry Division (Wehrmacht)
- Conflicts: Battle of Kursk †
- Awards: Knight's Cross of the Iron Cross

Richard Müller (4 November 1891 – 16 July 1943) was a general in the Wehrmacht of Nazi Germany during World War II. He was a recipient of the Knight's Cross of the Iron Cross. Müller was killed on 16 July 1943 northeast of Orel, during the Battle of Kursk.

== Awards and decorations ==
- Knight's Cross of the Iron Cross on 7 March 1943 as Generalleutnant and commander of 211. Infanterie-Division

Military offices
Preceded by Generalleutnant Kurt Renner	Commander of 211. Infanterie-Division; 4 February 1942 – 16 July 1943	Succeeded by Generalleutnant Johann-Heinrich Eckhardt
