= 174th Reserve Division =

German military unit during WW II

- 174. Reserve-Division
- Active: 1940–44
- Country: Nazi Germany
- Branch: German Army (Wehrmacht)
- Type: Infantry
- Size: Division

Commanders
- Notable commanders: Friedrich-Georg Eberhardt

The 174th Reserve Division was a formation of the German Wehrmacht during World War II. Formed as the 174th Replacement Division on 10 June 1940, it commanded replacement training units in Saxony and the Sudetenland, based in Chemnitz. It was re-organised as the 174th Reserve Division on 15 September 1942 in the Protectorate of Bohemia and Moravia. The division continued to control training units until 1943 when those elements of the division were sent to northern Poland. On 31 July 1944 the division was absorbed by the 26th Infantry Division which had suffered heavy losses in the Battle of Kursk. The 26th Infantry Division was badly mauled at Kovel on the Eastern Front, and on 10 September 1944 was itself disbanded at Radom in central Poland and was absorbed into the 253rd Infantry Division.

== Order of battle ==
In December 1943, the major units of the division were:

- 24th Reserve Grenadier Regiment
- 209th Reserve Grenadier Regiment
- 266th Reserve Grenadier Regiment
- 14th Reserve Artillery Battalion
- 14th Reserve Engineer Battalion

== Commanders ==
The division was commanded by the following officers:

- Generalmajor (Brigadier) then Generalleutnant (Major General) Konrad Guhl (10 June 1940 – 1 April 1942)
- Generalleutnant Kurt Renner (1 April 1942 – 26 August 1943 (killed)
- Generalleutnant Friedrich-Georg Eberhardt (26 August 1943 – 31 July 1944)
