= Gustav Gihr =

World War II German general

- Gustav Gihr
- Born: 10 January 1894
- Died: 31 October 1959 (aged 65)
- Allegiance: German Empire; Weimar Republic; Nazi Germany
- Branch: Army
- Rank: Generalmajor
- Commands: 216th Infantry Division; 707th Infantry Division; 45th Infantry Division
- Conflicts: World War II: Bobruysk offensive (POW)

Gustav Gihr (18 August 1894 – 31 October 1959) was a German general in the Wehrmacht of Nazi Germany during World War II. He commanded several infantry divisions during the war before surrendering to the Red Army in 1944.

== Biography ==
On 15 May 1944 Gihr became commander of the 707th Infantry Division and fought during the Bobruisk Offensive on the Eastern Front. On 27 June 1944, at Bobruisk, Gihr was taken prisoner by the Red Army. He was released from captivity on 11 October 1955.

== Notes ==
Military offices
Preceded by Generalleutnant Egon von Neindorff	Commander of 216th Infantry Division; 20 October 1943 – 17 November 1943	Succeeded by —
Preceded by Oberst Carl Andre	Commander of 7th Infantry Division; 30 November 1943 – 8 December 1943	Succeeded by Generalleutnant Fritz-Georg von Rappard
Preceded by General der Infanterie Edgar Röhricht	Commander of 95th Infantry Division; 9 December 1943 – 27 February 1944	Succeeded by Generalmajor Herbert Michaelis
Preceded by Generalmajor Joachim Engel	Commander of 45th Infantry Division; 27 February 1944 – 9 April 1944	Succeeded by Generalmajor Joachim Engel
Preceded by Generalleutnant Johann-Georg Richert	Commander of 35th Infantry Division; 9 April 1944 – 11 May 1944	Succeeded by Generalleutnant Johann-Georg Richert
Preceded by Generalleutnant Rudolf Busich	Commander of 707th Infantry Division; 15 May 1944 – 27 June 1944	Succeeded by —
