= 35th Infantry Division (Wehrmacht) =

- Active: October 1936 – May 1945
- Country: Nazi Germany
- Branch: Army
- Type: Infantry
- Size: Division
- Engagements: World War II

The 35th Infantry Division (German: 35. Infanteriedivision) was a Heer infantry division.

== History ==
The 35th Infantry Division was raised in October 1936 in Germany's re-militarisation. It served mostly on the Eastern front.

In May 1940, the division was part of the German forces sent to invade France and Belgium, remaining as an occupational formation in the two nations until June the next year, when it took part in Operation Barbarossa. Between then and April 1945 the division would remain in the central and southern sectors before being forced back to East Prussia by the advancing Red Army.

On 7 December 1941, during the Battle of Moscow, the 35th Infantry Division fell under heavy attack by divisions of the 16th Army. The 8th Guards Rifle Division, 9th Guards Rifle Division and 18th Rifle Division pressured the defenses of the 35th Division, which was then deployed at the seam between Panzer Group 3 and Panzer Group 4.

The 35th Infantry Division was one of many Wehrmacht units which committed war crimes in the Soviet Union. During early 1944 it was involved in an operation in the Gomel Region of Belarus in which 40,000 civilians were expelled from their homes as the German Army retreated. They were herded into the makeshift Ozarichi concentration camp where approximately 9,000 civilians died. The 35th Infantry Division undertook a similar operation in early April 1944 in which it rounded up civilians who it then either used for forced labour or expelled from the region; 3,500 were expelled. During that month, the divisional engineer battalion's third company massacred civilians in the towns of Karpilovka and Rudabelka. This operation was planned by the company's officers, who retained control over their soldiers during the killings. Nine members of the division were convicted of this massacre by a Soviet military tribunal in 1947 and sentenced to 25 years of hard labour.

General Johann-Georg Richert who commanded the division between 5 November 1943 to 9 April 1944 was tried in the Minsk Trial, a war crimes trial held in front of a Soviet military tribunal in 1945–1946 in Minsk. The tribunal heard the case against 18 Wehrmacht, SS, and police officials accused of crimes committed during the occupation of Belarus. Alongside a Wehrmacht and a police general, Richert was the highest-ranking official of the occupying force on trial. Richert, along with 14 other defendants, was sentenced to death and executed by hanging on 30 January 1946.

== Commanders ==
- Generalleutnant Hubert Schaller-Kallide (12 Oct 1936 - 24 November 1938)
- General der Infanterie Hans Wolfgang Reinhard (24 November 1938 - 25 November 1940)
- General der Infanterie Walther Fischer von Weikersthal (25 November 1940 - 1 December 1941)
- General der Artillerie Rudolf Freiherr von Roman (1 December 1941 - 10 September 1942)
- Generalleutnant Ludwig Merker (10 September 1942 - April 1943)
- Generalleutnant Otto Drescher (Apr 1943 - 8 June 1943)
- Generalleutnant Ludwig Merker (8 June 1943 - 5 November 1943)
- Generalleutnant Johann-Georg Richert (5 November 1943 - 9 April 1944)
- Generalmajor Gustav Gihr (9 April 1944 - 11 May 1944)
- Generalleutnant Johann-Georg Richert (11 May 1944 - May 1945)
- Generalmajor der Reserve Dr. Ernst Meiners (May 1945)

== Order of battle ==
1939

- 34.Infanterie-Regiment
- 109. Infanterie-Regiment
- 111. Infanterie-Regiment
- 35. Aufklärungs-Abteilung
- 35. Artillerie-Regiment
- 35. Beobachtungs-Abteilung
- 35. Pionier-Bataillon
- 35. Panzerabwehr-Abteilung
- 35. Nachrichten-Abteilung
- 35. Feldersatz-Bataillon
- 35. Versorgungseinheiten

1942

- 34. Füsilier-Regiment
- 109. Grenadier-Regiment
- 111. Grenadier-Regiment
- 35. Radfahr-Abteilung
- 35. Artillerie-Regiment
- 35. Pionier-Bataillon
- 35. Panzerjäger-Abteilung
- 35. Nachrichten-Abteilung
- 35. Feldersatz-Bataillon
- 35. Versorgungseinheiten

1943

- 34. Füsilier-Regiment
- 109. Grenadier-Regiment
- 111. Grenadier-Regiment
- 35. Füsilier-Bataillon
- 35. Artillerie-Regiment
- 35. Pionier-Bataillon
- 35. Panzerjäger-Abteilung
- 35. Nachrichten-Abteilung
- 35. Feldersatz-Bataillon
- 35. Versorgungseinheiten

== See also ==
- List of German divisions in World War II
