= Johann-Georg Richert =

German Army general (1890–1946)

- Born: 14 April 1890; Liebau, Kreis Landeshut, Regierungsbezirk Liegnitz, Province of Silesia, Kingdom of Prussia, German Empire
- Died: 30 January 1946 (aged 55); Minsk, Byelorussian SSR, Soviet Union
- Status: Executed by hanging
- Motive: Nazism
- Conviction: War crimes
- Trial: Minsk Trial
- Penalty: Death
- Military career
- Relatives: ∞ 1922 Martha Sacksen; 3 children
- Allegiance: Kingdom of Prussia; German Empire; Weimar Republic; Nazi Germany
- Branch: Prussian Army; Imperial German Army; Reichsheer; German Army
- Service years: 1909–1945
- Rank: Generalleutnant
- Commands: 286th Security Division; 35th Infantry Division
- Conflicts: World War I World War II
- Awards: Knight's Cross of the Iron Cross with Oak Leaves

Johann-Georg Richert (14 April 1890 – 30 January 1946) was a German general during World War II. He commanded the 286th Security Division whose personnel committed numerous war crimes in occupied Belarus, in the Army Group Center Rear Area.

The 35th Infantry Division also committed war crimes during early 1944 while Richert was its commanding officer. The division's operations against "partisans" (who were often civilians) became more frequent and brutal after Richert assumed command. Richert also ordered that all of his soldiers who were in hospitals without injuries or a diagnosed illness be executed, and threatened units and commanding officers who were defeated in battle with severe penalties.

With the help of troops from Sonderkommando 7b of Einsatzgruppe B, Richert forced at least 40,000 civilians into the Ozarichi death camps, makeshift camps which had been established by Josef Harpe. Dieter Pohl has called the establishment of the camp "one of the worst crimes the Wehrmacht ever committed against civilians". By the time troops of the 65th Army of the First Belorussian Front liberated those in camps on 19 March 1944, at least 9,000 people had died. The troops freed 33,480 people, including 15,960 children under the age of 13, from the Ozarichi death camps.

Richert was taken prisoner by Soviet troops; he was tried in the Minsk Trial, a war crimes trial held in front of a Soviet military tribunal in 1945–1946 in Minsk. The tribunal heard the case against 18 German military, SS, and police officials accused of crimes committed during the occupation of Belarus. Alongside a Wehrmacht and a police general, Richert was the highest-ranking official of the occupying force on trial. Richert, along with 14 other defendants, was sentenced to death and executed by hanging on 30 January 1946.

== Promotions ==
- 1 October 1909 One-year volunteer (Einjährig-Freiwilliger)
- 11 March 1910 Fahnenjunker (Officer Candidate)
- April 1910 Fahnenjunker-Unteroffizier (Officer Candidate with Corporal/NCO/Junior Sergeant rank)
- 17 May 1910 Fähnrich (Officer Cadet)
- 20 March 1911 Leutnant (2nd Lieutenant)
- 6 June 1916 Oberleutnant (1st Lieutenant)
  - 1 July 1922 received Reichswehr Rank Seniority (RDA) from 6 June 1916 (17)
- 27 March 1923 Hauptmann (Captain) with effect and RDA from 1 April 1923 (4)
- 1 June 1933 Major (13)
- 18 January 1936 Oberstleutnant (Lieutenant Colonel) with effect and RDA from 1 January 1936 (23)
- 1 June 1938 Oberst (Colonel) (22)
- 8 April 1942 Generalmajor (Major General) with effect and RDA from 1 April 1942 (69)
- 20 April 1943 Generalleutnant (Lieutenant General) with effect and RDA from 1 March 1943 (7a)

== Awards and decorations ==
- Iron Cross (1914), 2nd and 1st Class
- Hanseatic Cross of Hamburg (HH)
- Honour Cross of the World War 1914/1918 with Swords
- Wehrmacht Long Service Award, 4th to 1st Class on 2 October 1936
- Repetition Clasp 1939 to the Iron Cross 1914, 2nd and 1st Class
  - 2nd Class on 20 September 1939
  - 1st Class on 3 October 1939
- Infantry Assault Badge in Silver on 5 February 1942
- Winter Battle in the East 1941–42 Medal
- German Cross in Gold on 1 December 1941 as Oberst and commander of the Infantry Regiment 23
- Knight's Cross of the Iron Cross with Oak Leaves
  - Knight's Cross on 17 March 1944 as Generalleutnant and commander of the 35th Infantry Division
  - Oak Leaves on 18 October 1944 as Generalleutnant and commander of the 35th Infantry Division

== Sources ==
- German Federal Archives: BArch PERS 6/829 and PERS 6/300447

Military offices
Preceded by Generalleutnant Kurt Müller	Commander of 286th Security Division; 15 June 1942 – 1 November 1943	Succeeded by Generalleutnant Hans Oschmann
Preceded by Generalleutnant Ludwig Merker	Commander of 35th Infantry Division; 5 November 1943 – 9 April 1944	Succeeded by Generalmajor Gustav Gihr
Preceded by Generalmajor Gustav Gihr	Commander of 35th Infantry Division; 11 May 1944 – 5 January 1945	Succeeded by Oberst Paul Baade
Preceded by Oberst Paul Baade	Commander of 35th Infantry Division; 26 March 1945 – May 1945	Succeeded by Generalmajor der Reserve Dr. Ernst Meiners
