= Otto Drescher =

German general (1895–1944)

- Born: 5 October 1895; Nikl, Austria-Hungary
- Died: 13 August 1944 (aged 48); Memel, East Prussia
- Military career
- Allegiance: Austria-Hungary; Weimar Republic; Nazi Germany
- Branch: Army
- Service years: 1914–20; 1936–44
- Rank: Generalleutnant
- Commands: 35th Infantry Division; 267th Infantry Division
- Conflicts: World War I World War II: Invasion of Poland; Battle of France; Operation Barbarossa; Battle of Białystok–Minsk; Battle of Kiev (1941); Battle of Moscow; Operation Bagration; Minsk Offensive †
- Awards: Knight's Cross of the Iron Cross

Otto Johann Drescher (5 October 1895 – 13 August 1944) was a German general in the Wehrmacht of Nazi Germany during World War II. He was a recipient of the Knight's Cross of the Iron Cross. Drescher died on 13 August 1944 in Memel (Klaipėda).

== Awards and decorations ==
- Knight's Cross of the Iron Cross on 6 April 1944 as generalleutnant and commander of 267th Infantry Division

Military offices
Preceded by Generalleutnant Ludwig Merker	Commander of 35th Infantry Division; April 1943 – 8 June 1943	Succeeded by Generalleutnant Ludwig Merker
Preceded by Generalleutnant Friedrich Stephan	Commander of 267th Infantry Division; 8 June 1943 – August 1944	Succeeded by None
