= 5th Army (Wehrmacht) =

- German: 5. Armee
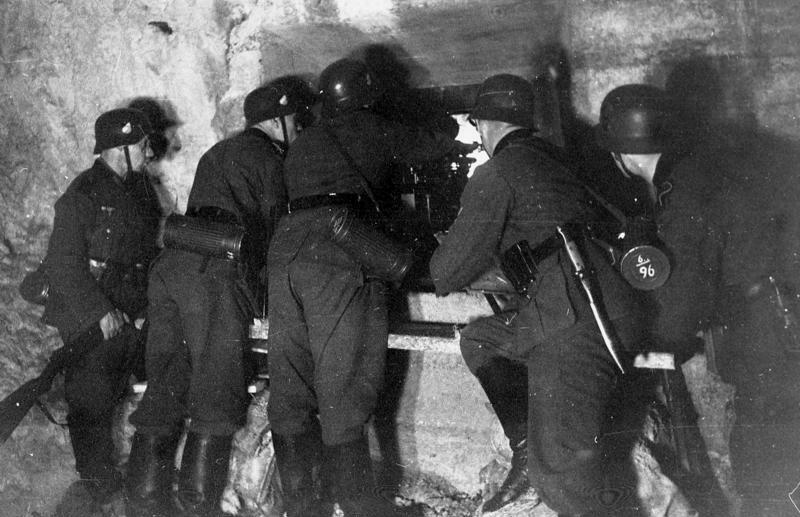
- Soldiers of the 5th Army at Siegfried-Line in Oberrehein, 1939
- Active: 1939
- Country: Nazi Germany
- Branch: German army ( Wehrmacht)
- Type: Field army
- Engagements: World War II

The 5th Army (German: 5. Armee) was a field army of the Wehrmacht during World War II.

== History ==
The 5th Army was established on 25 August 1939 in Wehrkreis VI with General Curt Liebmann in command. Responsible for the defense of the Siegfried Line in the vicinity of Trier as part of Army Group C from 3 September, the army was assigned the Eifel Border Troops (86th, Trier Border, 26th, and 227th Divisions) and the VI Army Corps (16th, 69th, 211th, and 216th Infantry Divisions). It also included the 58th, 87th, 78th, and 268th Infantry Divisions in army reserve. During this period, known as the Phoney War, no action took place on its sector of the Siegfried Line. On 13 October it was transferred to the east as Border Section Centre High Command (Oberkommando Grenzabschnitt Mitte). The latter served as a security force in occupied Poland. On 4 November 1939 it was renamed the 18th Army.

== Commanders ==
No.	Portrait	Commander	Took office	Left office	Time in office
1	Curt Liebmann	General der Infanterie; Curt Liebmann (1881–1960)	25 August 1939	4 November 1939	71 days

== See also ==
- 5th Army (German Empire) for the equivalent formation in World War I
