= Friedrich-Carl von Steinkeller =

- Born: 28 March 1896; Deutsch Krone, Province of West Prussia, Kingdom of Prussia, German Empire
- Died: 19 October 1981 (aged 85); Hannover, Lower Saxony, West Germany
- Relatives: ∞ 1928 Gudela Freiin Grote (1907–2001); 3 children
- Military career
- Allegiance: German Empire; Weimar Republic; Nazi Germany
- Branch: Imperial German Army; Reichsheer; German Army
- Service years: 1914–1919; 1934–1945
- Rank: Generalmajor
- Unit: Uhlan Regiment "Emperor Alexander II of Russia" (1st Brandenburg) No. 3
- Commands: Rifle Regiment 7 Panzer-Grenadier-Division Feldherrnhalle
- Conflicts: World War I World War II: Invasion of Poland; Battle of France; Operation Barbarossa; Battle of Białystok–Minsk; Battle of Smolensk (1941); Battle of Kursk; Battle of Kiev (1943); Operation Bagration; Mogilev Offensive
- Awards: Knight's Cross of the Iron Cross
- Other work: Banker

Friedrich-Carl Eugen Bogislaw Ewald von Steinkeller (28 March 1896 – 19 October 1981) was a general in the Wehrmacht of Nazi Germany during World War II. He was a recipient of the Knight's Cross of the Iron Cross.

== Life ==
Von Steinkeller served in World War I as an cavalry officer, orderly officer and general staff officer, having been severely wounded on 17 July 1916. He retired from the preliminary Reichswehr on 24 November 1919, studied at the University of Berlin from 1920 to 1924, was a member of the Freikorps in Upper Silesia from 1 May to 30 June 1921, worked as a banker and estate manager and rejoined the Reichswehr on 15 July 1934. He served with the cavalry, the motorcycle riflemen, the infantry riflemen and the Panzergrenadiers. He surrendered to the Red Army forces in the course of the Soviet Mogilev Offensive on 8 July 1944; he was repatriated on 9 October 1955.

== Promotions ==
- 19 August 1914 Fahnenjunker (Officer Candidate)
- 14 February 1915 Fähnrich (Officer Cadet)
- 18 May 1915 Leutnant (2nd Lieutenant) with Patent from 22 May 1914
- 24 November 1919 Charakter als Oberleutnant (Honorary 1st Lieutenant)
- 9 July 1934 Rittmeister with effect from 15 July 1934
  - 1 October 1934 received Rank Seniority (RDA) from 1 January 1934
  - 20 January (another source states 2 February) 1935 received ordinal number (Ordnungsnummer) "30" to his RDA from 1 January 1934
  - 15 October 1935 renamed Hauptmann (Captain)
- 30 September 1938 Major with effect and RDA from 1 October 1938 (40)
- 14 August 1941 Oberstleutnant (Lieutenant Colonel) with effect and RDA from 1 September 1941 (68)
- 10 March 1943 Oberst (Colonel) with effect and RDA from 1 January 1943 (46a)
- 25 May 1944 (telex date) Generalmajor (Major General) with effect and RDA from 1 June 1944 (17)

== Awards and decorations ==
- Iron Cross (1914), 2nd and 1st Class
  - 2nd Class in March 1915
  - 1st Class in November 1916
- Wound Badge (1918) in Black in August 1918
- Knight of Honour (Ehrenritter) of the Johanniter-Orden
- Honour Cross of the World War 1914/1918 with Swords
- Wehrmacht Long Service Award, 4th Class in 1938
- Anschluss Medal
- Sudetenland Medal
- Repetition Clasp 1939 to the Iron Cross 1914, 2nd and 1st Class on 20 June 1940
- Wound Badge (1939) in Black, Silver and Gold
  - Black on 10 July 1940
  - Silver on 1 February 1942
  - Gold on 20 October 1943
- Referenced by name in the Wehrmachtbericht on 8 July 1941
- Certificate of Recognition of the Commander-in-Chief of the Army on 10 July 1941
- Panzer Badge in Bronze on 24 September 1941
- German Cross in Gold on 1 June 1942
- Winter Battle in the East 1941–42 Medal on 15 August 1942
- Knight's Cross of the Iron Cross on 31 March 1943 as Oberstleutnant and commander Panzergrenadier-Regiment 7

== Sources ==
- German Federal Archives: BArch PERS 6/1937 and PERS 6/300991

Military offices
Preceded by Oberst Albert Henze	Commander of Panzer-Grenadier-Division Feldherrnhalle; 3 April 1944 – 8 July 1944	Succeeded by Generalmajor Günther Pape
