= Ernst Meiners =

German general (1893–1959)

- Born: 13 June 1893
- Died: 11 June 1959 (aged 65)
- Military career
- Allegiance: Nazi Germany
- Branch: Army
- Rank: Generalmajor
- Commands: 81st Infantry Division; 35th Infantry Division
- Conflicts: World War II
- Awards: Knight's Cross of the Iron Cross

Ernst Meiners (13 June 1893 – 11 June 1959) was a German general during World War II. He was a recipient of the Knight's Cross of the Iron Cross of Nazi Germany.

== Awards and decorations ==
- Knight's Cross of the Iron Cross on 17 December 1943 as Oberst der Reserve and commander of Grenadier-Regiment 161

Military offices
Preceded by Generalleutnant Vollrath Lübbe	Commander of 81. Infanterie-Division; 1 July 1944 – 10 July 1944	Succeeded by Generalleutnant Franz-Eccard von Bentivegni
Preceded by None	Commander of 547. Grenadier-Division; 15 July 1944 – 9 October 1944	Succeeded by Redesignated 547. Volksgrenadier-division
Preceded by Previously 547. Grenadier-Division	Commander of 547. Volksgrenadier-Division; 9 October 1944 – 8 February 1945	Succeeded by SS-Standartenführer Hans Kempin
Preceded by Generalleutnant Johann-Georg Richert	Commander of 35. Infanterie-Division ? May 1945 - ? May 1945	Succeeded by None
