= Eberhard Herf =

German police officer and convicted war criminal (1887–1946)

- Born: 20 March 1887; German Empire
- Died: 30 January 1946 (aged 58); Minsk, Byelorussian SSR, Soviet Union
- Occupation: Police officer
- Organization: Ordnungspolizei (Order Police) of Nazi Germany
- Known for: Commander of Police Regiment North; Chief of Order Police in Minsk
- Status: Executed by hanging
- Motive: Nazism
- Conviction: War crimes
- Trial: Minsk Trial
- Penalty: Death

Eberhard Herf (20 March 1887 – 30 January 1946) was a German police official and war criminal during the Nazi era. He commanded Police Regiment North and Order Police units in Minsk, Belarus. Following the war, Herf was convicted in the Minsk Trial and executed.

== Career ==
From June to October 1941, Herf commanded Police Regiment North that perpetrated mass murder in the Holocaust in the Army Group North Rear Area. He was subsequently appointed the commander of the Order Police in Minsk, the capital of Soviet Belarus (Kommandeur der Ordnungspolizei (KdO) Minsk). In this capacity, he directed mass murder of the Jews in the Minsk Ghetto. Herf reached the rank of general in the Order Police. In the summer of 1943, in between the KdO Minsk postings, Herf briefly served as Chief of staff to Erich von dem Bach-Zelewski, the Higher SS and Police Leader Central Russia. Later on in his career, Herf wrote to the Reich Security Main Office to request a transfer. He said he wanted "to get out of the East, since, to be honest, I've had enough."

== Minsk Trial ==
At the end of the war, Herf was taken prisoner by the Soviet Forces. He was tried in the Minsk Trial, a war crimes trial held in front of a Soviet military tribunal in 1945–1946 in Minsk. The tribunal heard the case against 18 German military, SS, and police officials accused of crimes committed during the occupation of Belarus. Alongside two Wehrmacht generals, Herf was the highest-ranking official of the occupying force on trial. The trial started in December 1945 and concluded in January 1946, with the sentence pronounced on 29 January. All 18 defendants were convicted; 14, Herf among them, were sentenced to death. He was executed by hanging on 30 January 1946.
