= 38th Infantry Division (Wehrmacht) =

- 38th Infantry Division Vehicle Insignia
- Active: 8 July 1942 – 14 November 1943
- Country: Nazi Germany
- Branch: Army
- Type: Infantry
- Size: Division
- Garrison/HQ: Munsterlager
- Engagements: World War II: Eastern Front

Commanders
- Notable commanders: Friedrich-Georg Eberhardt

The 38th Infantry Division (German: 38. Infanterie-Division) was a German Army infantry division in World War II. Formed in July 1942, it existed for a little over 15 months before being effectively destroyed in fighting on the Eastern Front in November 1943.

== History ==
The 38th Infantry Division was formed in July 1942 under the command of Generalleutnant (Note: The rank of generalleutnant is equivalent to that of major general in the United States Army.) Friedrich-Georg Eberhardt. After serving garrison duty in The Hague shortly after its formation, the division was transferred to Occupied France. It was based at Saint-Nazaire on the west coast, as part of the 7th Army.

Transferred to the Eastern Front in early 1943, the division was engaged in various actions against the Russian Army. By September, the division had been reduced to little more than regiment size and it came under the operational control of the 62nd Infantry Division. Losses incurred during the Battle of the Dnieper meant that the 38th Infantry Division officially ceased to exist on 14 November 1943. The surviving members of the division were transferred to the 276th Infantry Division.

== Commanders ==
- Generalleutnant Friedrich-Georg Eberhardt (8 July 1942 - 1 September 1943)
- Oberst Knut Eberding (1 September 1943 - 3 October 1943).
- Vacant (3 October 1943 - 14 November 1943)

(Note: Ranks stated are those at the time of taking command.)

== Notes ==
Footnotes

Citations
