= 211th Infantry Division (Wehrmacht) =

- 211. Infanterie-Division
- Unit insignia
- Active: August 1939 – 1944; November 1944 – March 1945 (as 211th Volksgrenadier Division)
- Country: Nazi Germany
- Branch: Army (Wehrmacht)
- Type: Infantry
- Size: Division
- Engagements: Battle of Kursk; Battle of Nevel; Operation Bagration

Commanders
- Notable commanders: Kurt Renner; Richard Müller; Johann-Heinrich Eckhardt

The 211th Infantry Division (German: 211. Infanterie-Division) was a German infantry division of the German Heer during World War II, active from 1939 to 1944.

In 1944, it was redeployed as 211th Volksgrenadier Division, which was active until 1945.

== Operational history ==
=== 211th Infantry Division ===
The 211th Infantry Division was deployed as part of the third Aufstellungswelle as 26 August 1939 in Wehrkreis VI (Münster). It consisted of Artillery Regiment 211 as well as the Infantry Regiments 306, 317 and 365, which were raised from Euskirchen, Cologne and Bonn respectively. It was initially deployed as part of VI Army Corps (Otto-Wilhelm Förster) under 5th Army (Curt Liebmann), which was part of Army Group C (Wilhelm Ritter von Leeb). The initial divisional commander was Kurt Renner.

The Artillery Regiment 211 was transferred to 162nd Division on 1 January 1940. The Regiment 306 was transferred to 557th Infantry Division on 6 February 1940. The division served in Brittany in occupied France on occupation duty from 1940 to 1942.

In January 1942, the 211th Infantry Division was transferred to the Eastern Front in response to the Soviet winter offensive of 1941/42. In June 1941, the division had consisted of 324 rifle squadrons, 81 50mm mortars, 110 heavy machine guns, 48 light machine guns, 90 anti-tank rifles, 54 81mm mortars, 1170 horse teams, 283 trucks, 127 light transport vehicles, 50 motorcycle squadrons, 21 bicycle squadrons, 8 75mm infantry guns, 51 37mm anti-tank guns, 1 medium halftrack, 36 engineer squadrons, 9 light engineer squadrons, and 36 104mm howitzers. Starting in February 1942, the division was commanded by Richard Müller.

In the Soviet Union, the division was assigned to defensive duty in the Bryansk sector from February 1942 to July 1943. On 8 May 1942, a new Artillery Regiment was formed from the forces of the 164th Infantry Division. In fall 1943, parts of the dissolved 321st Infantry Division were merged into the 211th Infantry Division. On 16 July 1943, the divisional commander Richard Müller was killed in action at the Battle of Kursk and subsequently replaced by Johann-Heinrich Eckhardt. The division participated in the Battle of Nevel in December 1943.

The division was involved in defensive operations against Soviet forces during the Soviet summer offensive of 1944, Operation Bagration. After defensive combat at Różan against Red Army forces in 1944, the division was largely destroyed. Its redeployment as a Volksgrenadier Division was ordered on 25 November 1944.

=== 211th Volksgrenadier Division ===
In December 1944, the division was redeployed as the 211th Volksgrenadier Division. It served in Hungary starting in January 1945, where it surrendered to American and Soviet forces near Budweis in March 1945. Parts of the division went into American captivity, the rest became Soviet prisoners.

== Legacy ==
A memorial for the members of the 211th Division was placed in the city of Leverkusen in southern North Rhine-Westphalia, the region where the division was assembled from.

== Noteworthy Individuals ==
- Kurt Renner, divisional commander from 1939 to 1942.
- Richard Müller, divisional commander from 1942 to 1943.
- Johann-Heinrich Eckhardt, divisional commander from 1943 to 1945.
- Michael Rossmann, chief of staff from 1939 to 1942.
- Hans-Alexander von Voss, chief of staff from 1942 to 1943.
- Klaus Müller, chief of staff from 1943 to 1944.
- Valentin Meyer, chief of staff in 1944.

== Literature ==
- Unternehmen Erinnerung. Eine Chronik über den Weg und den Einsatz des Grenadier-Regiments 317 in der 211. Infanterie-Division 1939-1945. (German)
