= Kurt Renner =

- Born: 15 September 1886; Plauen
- Died: 26 August 1943 (aged 56); Ożarów, Poland
- Military career
- Allegiance: German Empire (to 1918); Weimar Republic (to 1933); Nazi Germany
- Service years: 1906–1943
- Rank: Generalleutnant
- Commands: 211th Infantry Division; 174th Reserve Division
- Conflicts: World War I World War II: Battle of France

Kurt Renner was a German general (Generalleutnant) in the Wehrmacht during World War II who commanded the 211th Infantry Division and the 174th Reserve Division. He was killed whilst in command of the 174th Reserve Division on 26 August 1943 by Polish underground forces near Ożarów.

== Notes and references ==
Notes

Bibliography

- Mitcham, Samuel W. (2007). German Order of Battle: 1st-290th Infantry Divisions in World War II. Mechanicsburg: Stackpole Books. ISBN 978-0-8117-3416-5.
