= Mikuleč =

- Municipality
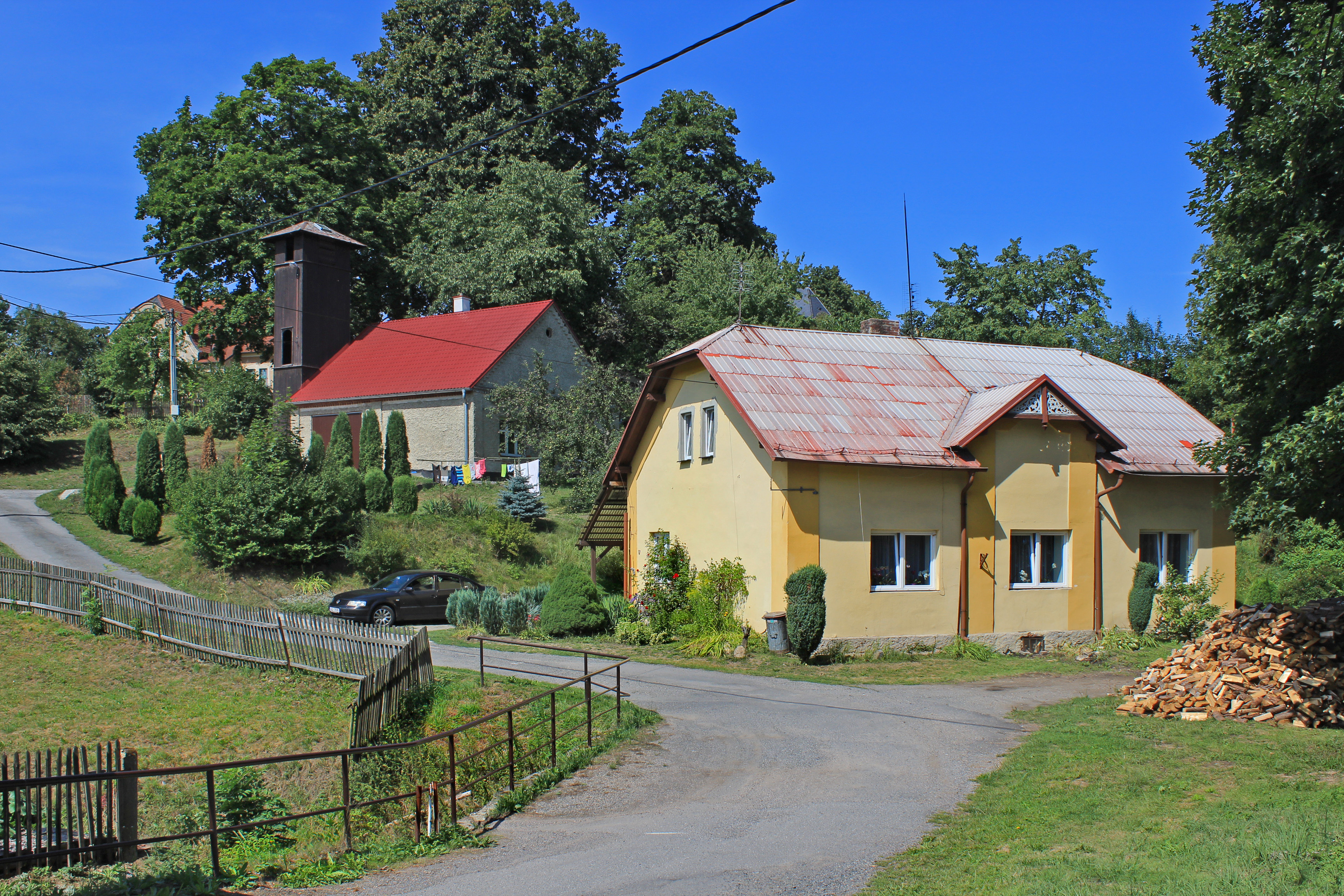
- Firehouse

- Flag Coat of arms

- Location in the Czech Republic
- Coordinates: 49°48′21″N 16°25′21″E
- Country: Czech Republic
- Region: Pardubice
- District: Svitavy
- First mentioned: 1347

Area
  - Total: 9.92 km^{2} (3.83 sq mi)
- Elevation: 495 m (1,624 ft)

Population (2026-01-01)
  - Total: 261
  - Density: 26.3/km^{2} (68.1/sq mi)
- Time zone: UTC+1 (CET)
  - Summer (DST): UTC+2 (CEST)
- Postal code: 568 02
- Website: www.obecmikulec.net

Mikuleč (German: Nikl) is a municipality and village in Svitavy District in the Pardubice Region of the Czech Republic. It has about 300 inhabitants.

Mikuleč lies approximately 7 kilometres (4 mi) north-west of Svitavy, 54 km (34 mi) south-east of Pardubice, and 148 km (92 mi) east of Prague.

== Demographics ==
Historical population
Year	Pop.	±%
1869	951	—
1880	944	−0.7%
1890	940	−0.4%
1900	936	−0.4%
1910	851	−9.1%
1921	761	−10.6%
1930	659	−13.4%
1950	375	−43.1%
1961	325	−13.3%
1970	309	−4.9%
1980	255	−17.5%
1991	193	−24.3%
2001	230	+19.2%
2011	221	−3.9%
2021	272	+23.1%
Source: Censuses

== Notable people ==
- Otto Drescher (1895–1944), German general
