= Faimbe =

- Commune
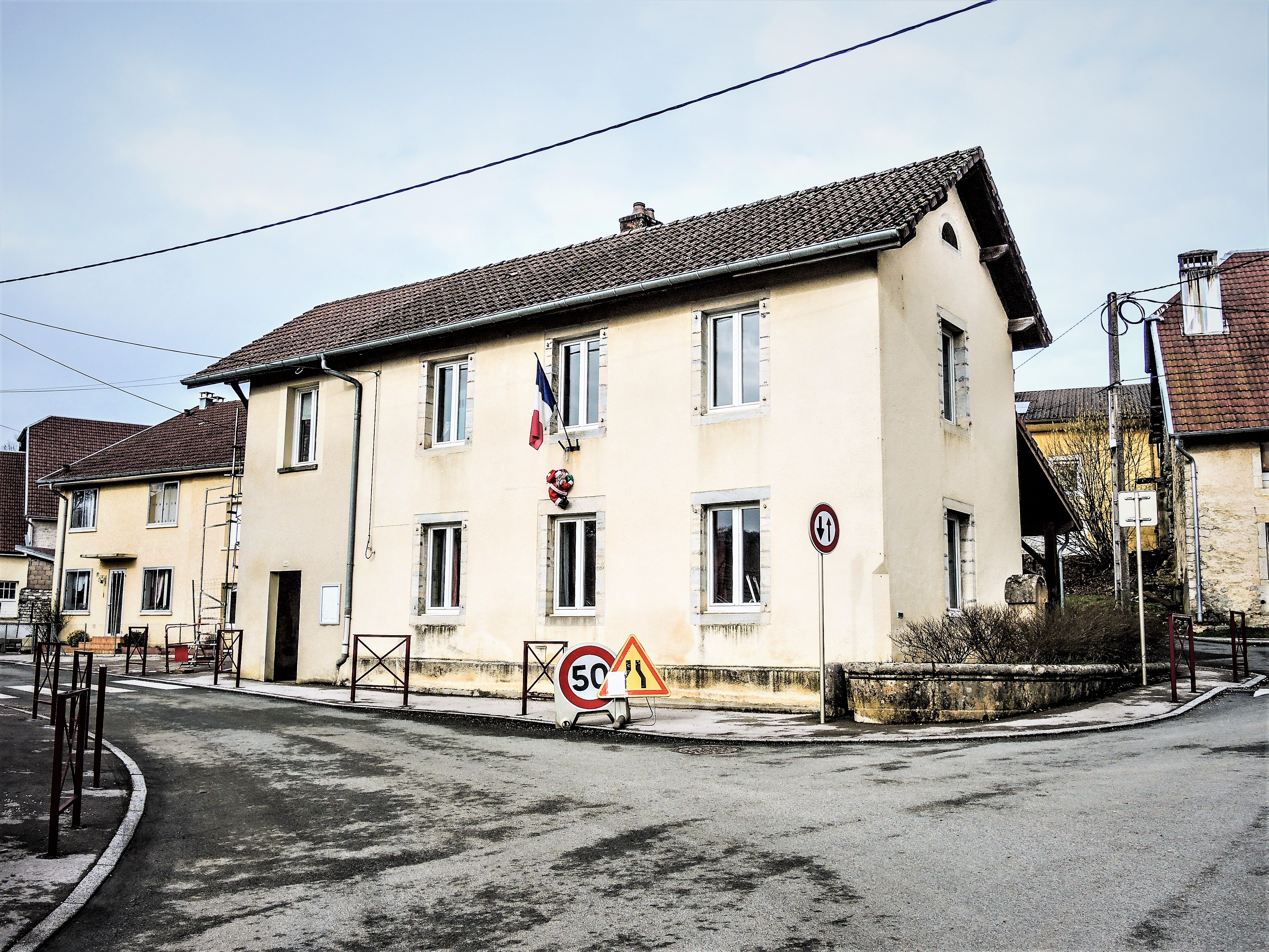
- The town hall in Faimbe
- Location of Faimbe
- Location within France Location within Bourgogne-Franche-Comté
- Coordinates: 47°29′20″N 6°36′51″E
- Country: France
- Region: Bourgogne-Franche-Comté
- Department: Doubs
- Arrondissement: Montbéliard
- Canton: Bavans
- Intercommunality: Deux Vallées Vertes

Government
  - Mayor (2020–2026): François Hermosilla
- Area^{1}: 1.97 km^{2} (0.76 sq mi)
- Highest elevation: 430 m (1,410 ft)
- Lowest elevation: 327 m (1,073 ft)
- Population (2023): 96
  - Density: 49/km^{2} (130/sq mi)
- Time zone: UTC+01:00 (CET)
  - Summer (DST): UTC+02:00 (CEST)
- INSEE/Postal code: 25232 /25250
- ^{1} French Land Register data, which excludes lakes, ponds, glaciers > 1 km^{2} (0.386 sq mi or 247 acres) and river estuaries.

Faimbe (French pronunciation: [fɛ̃b]) is a commune in the Doubs department in the Bourgogne-Franche-Comté region in eastern France.

== Population ==
Historical population
Year	Pop.	±% p.a.
1968	52	—
1975	56	+1.06%
1982	69	+3.03%
1990	95	+4.08%
1999	115	+2.15%
2007	109	−0.67%
2012	109	+0.00%
2017	107	−0.37%
2023	96	−1.79%
Source: INSEE

== See also ==
- Communes of the Doubs department
