= Minsk Trial =

1946 trial for German war crimes in Belarus

- Defendants at the trial
- Court: Soviet military tribunal Minsk
- Decided: 29 January 1946

The Minsk Trial was a war crimes trial held in front of a Soviet military tribunal in 1946 in Minsk, the capital of Soviet Belarus. Defendants included German military, police, and SS officials who were responsible for implementing the occupational policies in Belarus during the German–Soviet War of 1941–45.

== Proceedings ==
The tribunal heard the case against 18 German military, SS, and other officials accused of crimes committed during the occupation of Belarus, in the course of the Soviet-German war of 1941–1945. The defendants included 11 members of the Wehrmacht, including two generals; four members of the police (Ordnungspolizei), including a police general; and three members of the Waffen-SS and SD.

The trial started in December 1945 and concluded in January 1946, with the sentence pronounced on 29 January. All 18 defendants were convicted; 14 were sentenced to death. They were hanged in public the following day in the horse racing venue of Minsk (now 40th Anniversary of October Park) with over 100,000 civilian spectators.

== Defendants ==
Name	Rank	Role	Sentence
Johann-Georg Richert (born 1890)	Wehrmacht Lieutenant General	Commanded the 286th Security Division and the 35th Infantry Division	Death, executed on 30 January 1946
Gottfried von Erdmannsdorff (born 1893)	Wehrmacht Major General	Commander of the 465th Division and "Fortress Mogilev"	Death, executed on 30 January 1946
Eberhard Herf (born 1887)	SS-Brigadeführer for the Police	Commander of the Police Regiment North Commander of the Order Police in the Minsk region	Death, executed on 30 January 1946
Georg Robert Weißig (born 1896)	Police Lieutenant Colonel	Commander of the 26th SS Police Regiment	Death, executed on 30 January 1946
Ernst August Falk (born 1917)	Police Captain	Battalion Commander in the 26th SS Police Regiment	Death, executed on 30 January 1946
Reinhard Georg Moll (1891)	Wehrmacht Major	Local commander of Babruysk and Parichi	Death, executed on 30 January 1946
Karl Max Languth (born 1898)	Wehrmacht Captain	Commandant of the Babruysk POW camp	Death, executed on 30 January 1946
Hans Hermann Koch (born 1914)	SS-Obersturmführer and Gestapo-Kommissar	Commander of the Sicherheitspolizei in Orsha, Barysaw, and Slonim and officer for Einsatzgruppe B	Death, executed on 30 January 1946
Rolf Oskar Burchard (born 1907)	Lieutenant	Special commander in Babruysk	Death, executed on 30 January 1946
August Josef Bittner (born 1894)	Lieutenant	Sonderführer and chief of the Babruysk agricultural command	Death, executed on 30 January 1946
Bruno Max Götze (born 1898)	Wehrmacht Captain	Commandant of the Babruysk	20 years imprisonment with hard labor, died in Vorkutlag in 1951
Paul Karl Eick (born 1897)	Wehrmacht Captain	Deputy commander in Orsha	Death, executed on 30 January 1946
Bruno Franz Mittmann (born 1901)	Sergeant	Gendarmerie in Minsk	Death, executed on 30 January 1946
Franz Hess (born 1909)	SS-Unterscharführer	32nd Sonderkommando for Minsk SD	Death, executed on 30 January 1946
Heinz Johann Fischer (born 1923)	Waffen-SS Corporal	8th SS Cavalry Division Florian Geyer	Death, executed on 30 January 1946
Hans Josef Höchtl (born 1924)	Wehrmacht Private	718th Field Training Regiment	20 years imprisonment with hard labour
Alois Kilian Hetterich (born 1924)	Wehrmacht Private	595th Infantry Regiment	15 years imprisonment with hard labour
Albert Johann Rodenbusch (born 1915)	Wehrmacht Private	635th Training Regiment	15 years imprisonment with hard labour

== Controversy ==
In 2004, a German article about the trial discussed issues with the confessions, as well as the unusual degree of leniency shown in the cases of the four soldiers who managed to get out of the trial alive. The higher-ranking defendants were judged as having command responsibility over atrocities, including mass murder, committed by their troops. Lower-ranking defendants were judged for their individual crimes.

Mittmann was ruled to have shot and hanged eight people suspected of being connected to partisans, including children, after various forms of abuse, and a peasant family of three who were killed and then had their bodies burned. Fischer was ruled to have shot a 17-year-old Jewish girl and another Soviet civilian suspected of being a partisan. Both of them were hanged.

Rodenbusch confessed that "I myself burned down 15 houses and shot eight people during this whole operation, including two women. In this village I shot four men, two women and three children." However, the court apparently only sentenced him for arson and the shootings of two teenagers suspected of looting. The murder charges for the shootings of the two teenagers were lowered to complicity to murder.

Höchtl had been indicted for 230 murders, but confessed to even more crimes during the investigation. During an anti-partisan operation in February 1943, Höchtl claimed he and his platoon burned 70 houses and killed at least 2000 civilians, and personally claimed to have burned 40 houses and shot 280 people. The court only sentenced Höchtl for complicity to murder, and he was sentenced to 20 years in prison with hard labour.

Although Hetterich said he might have committed up to 15 murders (he said, "If I had hit the target, I would have shot 15 people because I fired 15 shots"), he was never charged with personally killing anyone. He was sentenced to 15 years of hard labour for complicity to murder.
