= Erwin Vierow =

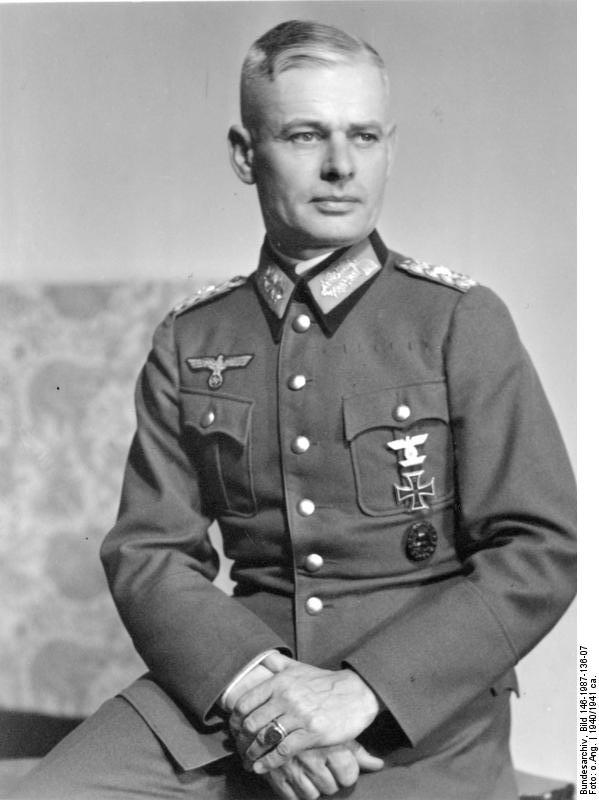
- General Erwin Vierow
- Born: 15 May 1890
- Died: 1 February 1982 (aged 91)
- Military career
- Branch: Army
- Service years: 1908–1944
- Rank: General of the Infantry
- Commands: 9th Infantry Division; LV Army Corps; Military Commandant of Kharkov; General Command Somme
- Conflicts: World War II

General Erwin Vierow (15 May 1890 – 1 February 1982) was a general in the Wehrmacht of Nazi Germany during World War II.

Between the wars he served on the General Staff of the Reichswehr and in the infantry and by the outbreak of World War II he had reached the rank of Generalmajor in the Wehrmacht. In August 1940 was appointed as commander of the 9th Infantry Division. Serving on the Eastern Front as commander of 55th Army Corps he became the military commandant of the city of Kharkov upon its capture on 24 October 1941. He was awarded the Knight's Cross of the Iron Cross on November 15, 1941.

On 1 July 1943, he was appointed commander of the army in northwest France, covering the regions of Laon, Orléans and Rouen and held this command until September 1944 when he was appointed chief of the ad hoc ‘General Command Somme’. He held this post until he surrendered to the British forces.

== Awards ==
- Knight's Cross of the Iron Cross on 15 November 1941 as General der Infanterie and commanding general of the LV. Armeekorps
  Wound Badge

Military offices
Preceded by none	Commander of the 96. Infanterie-Division; 15 September 1939 – 5 August 1940	Succeeded by Generalleutnant Wolf Schede
Preceded by Generalleutnant Georg von Apell	Commander of the 9. Infanterie-Division; 1 August 1940 – 31 December 1940	Succeeded by Generalleutnant Siegmund Freiherr von Schleinitz
Preceded by New Creation	Commander of LV. Armeekorps; 6 January 1941 - 13 February 1942	Succeeded by Generalmajor Rudolf Freiherr von Roman
