= Ozarichi concentration camp =

Complex of Nazi German death camps in Belarus

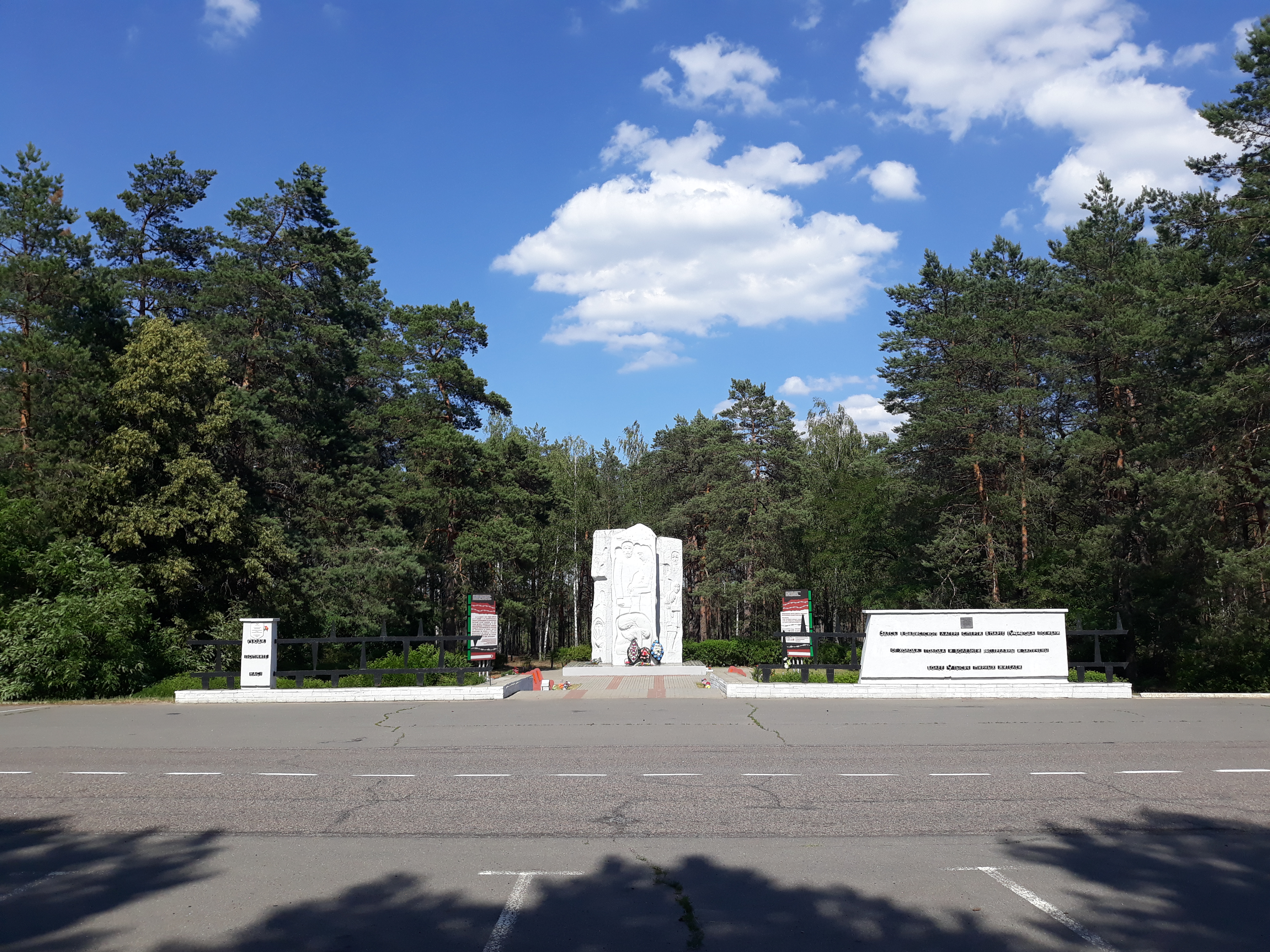
Ozarichi camp memorial

The Ozarichi concentration camp was a series of three concentration camps set up by the Wehrmacht in occupied Belarus during World War II. During a roughly 2 week period, between 17,000 and 20,000 people were killed. It was liberated by the Red Army on 19 March 1944.
