= Aufstellungswelle =

German system of mobilization in 1939–1945

In the German Wehrmacht before and during World War II, infantry divisions were raised as part of a designated Aufstellungswelle (deployment wave) or Welle (wave), sometimes translated as "draft". The Aufstellungswelle system was adopted by the Wehrmacht in late 1938. Peacetime units were the first wave, and 34 other waves followed until the 35th wave in April 1945. Several types of divisions were organized by Aufstellungswelle, including infantry, security, shadow and Volksgrenadier divisions.

== Background ==
The mobilization model for the Wehrmacht's active and reserve forces in multiple waves was first issued in the annual mobilization plan of 8 December 1938. The system initially had four waves, the first of which would be the peacetime army and the other three raised in anticipation of the invasion of Poland. The first wave (the peacetime army) consisted of divisions with ordinal numbers of one to 50. The second wave, reservists who had completed their compulsory training, consisted of divisions numbered 51 to 100. The third wave, numbered 201 to 250, would consist of reservists with less training than those of the second wave who would need refresher training due to their age (born between 1901 and 1913). The fourth wave, numbered 251 to 300, would be formed from training units in Germany. The first wave would be fully operational on the second day of mobilization, the second wave on the third day, the third wave on the sixth day, and the fourth wave on the seventh day.

== Waves ==
=== Before World War II ===
The divisions of the first Aufstellungswelle were those that consisted of the 104 Infantry Regiments raised prior to 1 September 1939 (Infantry Regiment 97 was added to 46th Infantry Division upon mobilization, bringing the regimental count of the first wave to 105). 35 divisions are counted among those of the first wave, including most of the 36 lowest-numbered divisions. The only exceptions are the 2nd Infantry Division, 13th Infantry Division, 20th Infantry Division, and 29th Infantry Division. These four divisions had been motorized and attached to armored formations, and were accordingly treated differently than the rest of the peacetime infantry divisions.

The divisions were intended to be staffed by 518 officers, 102 bureaucrats, 2,573 NCOs and 13,667 soldiers, for a total of 16,860 staff members. Equipment included 3,681 pistols, 12,609 rifles, 535 machine guns, 26 infantry support guns, 75 anti-tank guns, 48 artillery guns, 530 motorcycles, 394 cars, 536 trucks, and 5,375 horses. A first-wave infantry division was organized in three infantry regiments, each containing three battalions. Each battalion consisted of three rifle companies with, initially, nine light and two heavy machine guns each (later replaced with twelve light machine guns and three light grenade launchers each). Each battalion also contained a machine-gun company with eight heavy machine guns, later upgraded to twelve. It also had an infantry-gun company with two heavy and six light infantry guns, and an anti-tank company with twelve PaKs.

The following 35 divisions were part of the first wave:

- 1st Infantry Division
- 3rd Infantry Division
- 4th Infantry Division
- 5th Infantry Division
- 6th Infantry Division
- 7th Infantry Division
- 8th Infantry Division
- 9th Infantry Division
- 10th Infantry Division
- 11th Infantry Division
- 12th Infantry Division
- 14th Infantry Division
- 15th Infantry Division
- 16th Infantry Division
- 17th Infantry Division
- 18th Infantry Division
- 19th Infantry Division
- 21st Infantry Division
- 22nd Infantry Division
- 23rd Infantry Division
- 24th Infantry Division
- 25th Infantry Division
- 26th Infantry Division
- 27th Infantry Division
- 28th Infantry Division
- 30th Infantry Division
- 31st Infantry Division
- 32nd Infantry Division
- 33rd Infantry Division
- 34th Infantry Division
- 35th Infantry Division
- 36th Infantry Division
- 44th Infantry Division
- 45th Infantry Division
- 46th Infantry Division

=== 1939 (before invasion of Poland) ===
==== Second wave ====
Units of the second Aufstellungswelle were among the three waves mobilized in 1939 before the invasion of Poland on 1 September of that year. The second-wave divisions were smaller than those of the first wave by at least 1,000 to 2,000 men. A second-wave division included 491 officers, 98 bureaucrats, 2,273 NCOs and 12,411 soldiers. Equipment included 3,801 pistols, 10,828 rifles, 459 machine guns, 26 infantry-support guns, 75 anti-tank guns, 48 artillery guns, 597 motorcycles, 393 cars, 509 trucks, and 5,854 horses.

Sixteen divisions with three regiments each were part of the second wave, for a total of 48 regiments.

Infantry divisions of the second Aufstellungswelle
| Division | Subordinate infantry regiments | Associated Wehrkreis |
|---|---|---|
| 52nd Infantry Division | 163, 181, 205 | IX |
| 56th Infantry Division | 171, 192, 234 | IV |
| 57th Infantry Division | 179, 199, 217 | VII |
| 58th Infantry Division | 154, 209, 220 | X |
| 61st Infantry Division | 151, 162, 176 | I |
| 62nd Infantry Division | 164, 183, 190 | VIII |
| 68th Infantry Division | 169, 188, 196 | III |
| 69th Infantry Division | 159, 193, 236 | VI |
| 71st Infantry Division | 191, 194, 211 | XI |
| 73rd Infantry Division | 170, 186, 213 | XIII |
| 75th Infantry Division | 172, 202, 222 | II |
| 76th Infantry Division | 178, 203, 230 | III |
| 78th Infantry Division | 195, 215, 238 | V |
| 79th Infantry Division | 208, 212, 226 | XII |
| 86th Infantry Division | 167, 184, 216 | VI |
| 87th Infantry Division | 173, 185, 187 | IV and IX |

==== Third wave ====
Units of the third Aufstellungswelle were part of the three waves raised before the invasion of Poland. Third-wave divisions were larger than those of the first wave, usually by about 600 men. The difference was less than intended: the required strength of a third-wave division included 578 officers, 94 bureaucrats, 2,722 NCOs and 14,507 soldiers, compared with 16,860 for a first-wave division). The third-wave divisions were armed with 4,640 pistols, 11,423 rifles, 709 machine guns, 26 infantry-support guns, 75 anti-tank guns, 48 artillery guns, 425 motorcycles, 330 cars, 248 trucks and 6,033 horses. Although a third-wave divisions had more men, the quantity of their motorcycles, cars and trucks was lower than that of a first-wave division. Divisions of the third wave, many of which were deployed under Army Group C in defensive roles against France between September 1939 and the summer of 1940, were considered lacking by Army Group C commander Wilhelm Ritter von Leeb (who reported to Franz Halder on 3 October 1939 that third-wave divisions were, in his view, suitable only for relatively-quiet conditions).

The third wave consisted of twenty-two infantry divisions: the 205th through 209th, 211th through 218th, 221st, 223rd, 225th, 227th, 228th, 231st, 239th, 246th and 311th.

==== Fourth wave ====
Units of the fourth Aufstellungswelle were among the three waves raised before the invasion of Poland. Fourth-wave divisions were smaller than those of the first wave by at least 1,000 to 2,000 men. The nominal strength of each division was 491 officers, 99 bureaucrats, 2,165 NCOs and 12,264 soldiers. They were equipped with 3,639 pistols, 10,807 rifles, 457 machine guns, 20 infantry-support guns, 75 anti-tank guns, 48 artillery guns, 529 motorcycles, 359 cars, 536 trucks and 4,077 horses. Army Group C commander von Leeb reported to Halder on 3 October 1939 that the fourth-wave divisions were, in his view, only suitable for combat if they received additional defensive training.

The fourth wave consisted of fourteen infantry divisions: the 251st through 258th, the 260th, the 262nd, the 263rd and the 267th through 269th.

=== 1939 (after invasion of Poland) ===
==== Fifth wave ====
The fifth Aufstellungswelle was the first wave of units raised after the beginning of World War II in Europe. These divisions had their infantry regiments' 13th companies' infantry guns replaced with grenade launchers, and their 14th companies were armed with horse-drawn anti-tank guns. The fifth-wave units replaced their reconnaissance detachments with bicycle companies. Unlike the first four waves (which were armed with German-produced materiel), the fifth-wave units' weapons were taken from Czechoslovakia, which Germany annexed between 1938 and 1939.

The idea of raising five additional divisions had already been considered before the outbreak of war, and was ordered on 8 September 1939. The regimental commanders were named on 25 September, and the deadline for divisional combat readiness placed on 1 November. Experienced officers and NCOs were drawn not only from Döberitz infantry school, but also from the two army groups that had been active in the Invasion of Poland (Army Group North, Army Group South).

The fifth wave consisted of five infantry divisions: the 93rd through 96th and the 98th. The 93rd and 94th divisions were staffed with the veteran leaders drawn from Army Group North, whereas the leaderships of the 95th, 96th, and 98th divisions were filled by former members of Army Group South. The enlisted men were drawn from older German men who had initially been too old for conscription.

Infantry divisions of the fifth Aufstellungswelle
| Division | Subordinate infantry regiments |
|---|---|
| 93rd Infantry Division | 270, 271, 272 |
| 94th Infantry Division | 267, 274, 276 |
| 95th Infantry Division | 278, 279, 280 |
| 96th Infantry Division | 283, 284, 287 |
| 98th Infantry Division | 282, 289, 290 |

==== Sixth wave ====
In the units of the sixth Aufstellungswelle, assembled by 14 November 1939, the 13th companies of the infantry regiments were not deployed. The anti-tank and the reconnaissance detachments were one company each. Like the fifth-wave units, the sixth wave was armed with Czechoslovak materiel.

The sixth wave consisted of four infantry divisions: the 81st through the 83rd and the 88th, for a total of twelve infantry regiments. Deployment was completed by 1 December 1939 and combat-readiness was achieved by 10 February 1940.

Infantry divisions of the sixth Aufstellungswelle
| Division | Subordinate infantry regiments |
|---|---|
| 81st Infantry Division | 161, 174, 189 |
| 82nd Infantry Division | 158, 166, 168 |
| 83rd Infantry Division | 251, 257, 277 |
| 88th Infantry Division | 245, 246, 248 |

==== Seventh wave ====
In the seventh Aufstellungswelle units, the anti-tank detachments were supported by a bicycle company. They were armed with German materiel, rather than the Czechoslovak materiel of the fifth and sixth waves.

The seventh wave consisted of sixteen infantry divisions: the 161st through 170th, the 181st, the 183rd and the 196th through the 199th.

=== 1940 ===
==== Eighth wave ====
The units of the eighth Aufstellungswelle (organizationally identical to those of the seventh wave) were assembled in February 1940, when the Wehrmacht was preparing for the Battle of France.

The eighth wave consisted of the 290th through the 299th Infantry Divisions.

==== Ninth wave ====
Armed with three infantry regiments, an infantry-gun, engineer and intelligence company, an artillery battery and a bicycle squadron each, the units of the ninth Aufstellungswelle were raised in preparation for the attack on France in February and March 1940.

The ninth wave consisted of nine infantry divisions: the 351st, 358th, 365th, 372nd, 379th, 386th, 393rd, 395th and 399th.

==== 10th wave ====
The units of the 10th Aufstellungswelle never saw service; they were mobilized in anticipation of a prolonged war in France, and the units were dissolved during deployment.

The tenth wave consisted of nine infantry divisions: the 270th through the 273rd, and the 276th through the 280th.

==== 11th wave ====
Armed with captured French materiel, the units of the 11th Aufstellungswelle were formed in October 1940.

The wave consisted of ten infantry divisions: the 121st through 123rd, the 125th, 126th, 129th, 131st, 132nd, 134th and the 137th.

==== 12th wave ====
Armed with French materiel in November 1940, the 12th Aufstellungswelle was similar to its predecessor.

The twelfth wave consisted of nine infantry divisions: the 97th, the 99th through 102nd, the 106th, and the 110th through 112th.

==== 13th wave ====
Intended as occupation forces of territories seized along the Western Front, the 13th Aufstellungswelle of November–December 1940 consisted of divisions whose infantry regiments were not equipped with infantry-gun or anti-tank companies, lacked reconnaissance or intelligence detachments, and had smaller artillery and anti-tank detachments. They were armed with captured French materiel.

The thirteenth wave consisted of nine infantry divisions: the 302nd, the 304th through 306th, the 319th through 321st, the 323rd and the 327th.

==== 14th wave ====
The final mobilization of 1940, the 14th Aufstellungswelle was raised in November and December of that year and was similar to its predecessor.

The fourteenth wave consisted of eight infantry divisions: the 332nd, 333rd, the 335th through 337th, 339th, 340th and the 342nd.

=== 1941 ===
==== 15th wave ====
The divisions of the 15th Aufstellungswelle began to be assembled in April 1941 as occupation forces in the Balkans, where the Germans had recently invaded Yugoslavia and assisted Italy in the Battle of Greece. The divisions, with two infantry regiments, were weaker than the previous waves. Their regiments lacked infantry-gun and anti-tank artillery companies, and their battalions lacked heavy machine-gun companies. The divisions saw significant combat with the Yugoslav Partisans. The thirty regiments needed for the fifteen divisions were raised in accordance with a 13 April 1941 order, with two regiments assembled from each military district (Wehrkreis). The 702nd and 704th Divisions were ready by 1 May 1941, and the remaining divisions were ready two weeks later. The wave consisted of 15 infantry divisions: the 702nd, the 704th and the 707th through 719th.

- 702nd Infantry Division
- 704th Infantry Division
- 707th Infantry Division
- 708th Infantry Division
- 709th Infantry Division
- 710th Infantry Division
- 711th Infantry Division
- 712th Infantry Division
- 713th Infantry Division
- 714th Infantry Division
- 715th Infantry Division
- 716th Infantry Division
- 717th Infantry Division
- 718th Infantry Division
- 719th Infantry Division

==== 16th wave ====
At four brigades, the 16th Aufstellungswelle (assembled in June 1941, just before the German invasion of the Soviet Union) was the smallest deployment wave. Consisting of the 201st through 204th Security Brigades, the brigades were merged into the 201st Security Division and 203rd Security Division by the summer of 1942.

- 201st Security Division
- 203rd Security Division

==== 17th wave ====
The first mobilization wave during the German-Soviet War, the 17th Aufstellungswelle was assembled in December 1941. It consisted of four infantry divisions: the 328th through the 331st.

==== 18th wave ====
Assembled at the same time as the 17th wave, the units of the 18th Aufstellungswelle lacked a heavy-artillery detachment and had only one engineer company each. The wave consisted of five infantry divisions: the 383rd through the 385th, the 387th and the 389th.

=== 1942 ===
==== 19th wave ====
The 19th Aufstellungswelle, raised in March and April 1942, consisted of four infantry divisions: the 370th, 371st, 376th and 377th.

==== 20th wave ====
The 20th Aufstellungswelle was raised in July 1942. It consisted of three infantry divisions: the 38th, 39th and 65th.

=== 1943 ===
==== 21st wave ====
The 21st Aufstellungswelle was raised in October 1943. It consisted of eight infantry divisions: the 349th, 352nd, 353rd, 357th, 359th, 361st, 362nd and 367th.

==== 22nd wave ====
The 22nd Aufstellungswelle was raised in December 1943. It consisted of six infantry divisions: the 271st, 272nd and the 275th through 278th.

==== 23rd wave ====
The 23rd Aufstellungswelle, the last wave of 1943, was raised from December 1943 to January 1944. It consisted of four divisions: the 388th through 391st Security Divisions and the 52nd Field Training Division.

=== 1944 ===
==== 24th wave ====
As a result of losses sustained by the Wehrmacht, the 24th Aufstellungswelle was the first to include shadow divisions. Shadow divisions were trained "in the shadow" of regular divisions, and were called into action as reinforcements if the shadowed division incurred losses. Such divisions were typically named after their location, usually their exercise grounds. The wave was raised in January 1944. It consisted of four infantry shadow divisions: Mielau, Wahn, Milowitz and Demba.

==== 25th wave ====
Raised at the same time as the shadow divisions of the 24th wave, the 25th Aufstellungswelle consisted of five regular infantry divisions: the 77th, 84th, 89th, 91st and 92nd.

==== 26th wave ====
The 26th Aufstellungswelle, in April 1944, raised four shadow divisions: Böhmen, Neuhammer, Ostpreußen and Wildflecken.

==== 27th wave ====
The 27th Aufstellungswelle, in June 1944, was the first wave raised after the Normandy landings. It consisted of five infantry divisions: the 59th, 64th, 226th, 232nd and 237th.

==== 28th wave ====
Raised in July 1944, the 28th Aufstellungswelle was the third wave of shadow infantry divisions. It consisted of four divisions: Jütland, Schlesien, Münsingen and Grafenwöhr.

==== 29th wave ====
Raised in July 1944 at the same time as the 28th wave, the 29th Aufstellungswelle was the first of two waves of Volksgrenadier divisions. Consisting of 17 divisions (541st through 553rd, 558th, 559th, 561st and 562nd), it was the first Aufstellungswelle which raised ten or more divisions since the 15th wave's 15 divisions.

==== 30th wave ====
Raised in August 1944, the 30th Aufstellungswelle recreated several units which had been part of the first waves and were dissolved or destroyed in combat. It consisted of six divisions: the 12th, 16th, 19th, 36th (all part of the first wave) and 560th Infantry Divisions and the 563rd Volksgrenadier Division.

==== 31st wave ====
Raised in August 1944, the 31st Aufstellungswelle was the fourth (and penultimate) wave of shadow divisions. It mobilized five infantry divisions: Breslau, Döllersheim, Groß-Born, Mähren and Röhn.

==== 32nd wave ====
The largest mobilization since the first wave and the last in 1944, the 32nd Aufstellungswelle in August attempted to raise large numbers of Volkssturm conscripts to fill gaps in the regular divisions. The conscripts were initially organized into Volksgrenadier divisions, which were usually absorbed by other units to replenish weakened divisions. It consisted of 25 divisions: the 564th through 588th Volksgrenadier Divisions.

=== 1945 ===
==== 33rd wave ====
The first of three waves mobilized in 1945, the 33rd Aufstellungswelle was called up in January; several divisions were reactivated from previous waves. It consisted of ten divisions: the 48th Infantry Division, 85th Infantry Division (from the 25th wave), 189th Infantry Division, 245th Infantry Division, 246th Infantry Division (from the third wave), 275th Infantry Division (from the 22nd wave), 361st Infantry Division (from the 21st wave), 553rd Volksgrenadier Division, 708th Volksgrenadier Division and 716th Infantry Division (from the 15th wave).

==== 34th wave ====
The fifth and final wave of shadow divisions, the 34th Aufstellungswelle was assembled in February 1945. It consisted of five divisions: Dresden, Hamburg, Hannover, Donau and Jäger Division Alpen.

==== 35th wave ====
The third wave of 1945 and the final wave of the war, the 35th Aufstellungswelle was ordered on 29 March 1945. Three divisions were called up from the RFS education centers, and another three from the Reich Labour Service. Five of the divisions received officers from dissolved divisions which had been active; the sixth, Potsdam, received staff from the 85th Infantry Division who had not been deployed as part of the 33rd wave.

The wave consisted of six infantry divisions: Potsdam, Ulrich von Hutten, Scharnhorst, Schlageter, Friedrich Ludwig Jahn and Theodor Körner. A seventh division (ordered on 29 April 1945) was planned for Reich Labour Service members, but was not mobilized. The Ferdinand von Schill division followed the 35th-wave naming convention, but was not listed by the Feldpost military-mail service.

== Personnel and equipment ==
| Personnel | 1st-wave division | 2nd-wave division | 3rd-wave division | 4th-wave division | 1944 infantry division | 1945 infantry division |
|---|---|---|---|---|---|---|
| Officers | 518 | 491 | 578 | 491 | 333 | 352 |
| Bureaucrats | 102 | 98 | 94 | 99 | 70 | 29 |
| NCOs | 2,573 | 2,273 | 2,722 | 2,165 | 2,164 | 1,947 |
| Soldiers | 13,667 | 12,411 | 14,507 | 12,264 | 10,205 (Note: Not including an additional 1,455 Hiwis) | 9,581 (Note: Included 698 Hiwis) |
| Total | 16,860 | 15,273 | 17,901 | 15,019 | 12,772 | 11,909 |
| Equipment (Note: Selected equipment) | 1st-wave division | 2nd-wave division | 3rd-wave division | 4th-wave division | 1944 infantry division | 1945 infantry division |
| Pistols | 3,681 | 3,801 | 4,640 | 3,639 | 2,013 | 1,563 |
| Rifles | 12,609 | 10,828 | 11,423 | 10,807 | 8,598 | 7,594 |
| Machine guns | 535 | 459 | 709 | 457 | 716 | 536 |
| Infantry support guns | 26 | 26 | 26 | 20 | 25 | 35 |
| Anti-tank guns | 75 | 75 | 75 | 75 | 23 (Note: Ten Sturmgeschütz self-propelled artillery guns not included.) | 11 |
| Artillery guns | 48 | 48 | 48 | 48 | 43 | 37 |
| Motorcycles | 530 | 497 | 425 | 529 | 168 | 138 |
| Cars | 394 | 393 | 330 | 359 | 167 | 146 |
| Trucks | 536 | 509 | 248 | 536 | 370 | 185 |
| Horses | 5,375 | 4,854 | 6,033 | 4,077 | 3,979 | 3,979 |

== Literature ==
- Buchner, Alex. Das Handbuch der deutschen Infanterie 1939–1945 (in German). Dörfler Zeitgeschichte. ISBN 3895550418.
- Haupt, Werner (2005). Die deutschen Infanterie-Divisionen (in German). Eggolsheim: Nebel-Verlag. ISBN 3895552747.
