= Infantry Division Friedrich Ludwig Jahn =

- German: Infanterie-Division Friedrich Ludwig Jahn
- Active: 31 March – 8 May 1945
- Country: Nazi Germany
- Branch: Heer
- Type: Infantry
- Size: Division

The Infantry Division Friedrich Ludwig Jahn (German: Infanterie-Division Friedrich Ludwig Jahn) was an infantry division of the German army during World War II. It was formed in the final weeks of the war, and existed between late March and early May 1945.

The division was named for Friedrich Ludwig Jahn, a German gymnastics teacher and nationalist of the early 19th century.

== Operational history ==
The Infantry Division Friedrich Ludwig Jahn was formed on 31 March 1945 as one of the divisions of the 35th and final wave of deployment, along with the divisions Potsdam, Ulrich von Hutten, Scharnhorst, Schlageter, and Theodor Körner. These six formations were drawn from the staff of the Reich Labour Service (RAD) and the Reichsführerschulen (RFS), with RAD and RFS contributing three divisions each. Infantry Division Friedrich Ludwig Jahn was the second of the three RAD divisions, and accordingly also referred to as "2nd RAD Division". The initial commander of the division was Generalleutnant Friedrich-Wilhelm von Loeper. Command later passed to Gerhard Klein, who held his post until captured by Soviet forces on 23 April. Franz Weller subsequently held the command from 24 April until 3 May, before Ludwig Zöller took over from 3 May until the end of the war.

The division was initially assembled from RAD personnel as well as from members of the 251st Infantry Division, which had been battered in the Warka bridgehead in January 1945 and all but destroyed during its retreat to West Prussia. The division was initially assembled in Jüterbog, to the southwest of Germany's capital city Berlin.

The division was subdivided into the following formations:

- Grenadier Regiment Friedrich Ludwig Jahn 1
- Grenadier Regiment Friedrich Ludwig Jahn 2
- Grenadier Regiment Friedrich Ludwig Jahn 3
- Division Fusilier Battalion Friedrich Ludwig Jahn
- Artillery Regiment Friedrich Ludwig Jahn
- Pioneer Battalion Friedrich Ludwig Jahn

The division was deployed with the 12th Army (Walther Wenck). It reached the Elbe river near Ferchland, where it surrendered to United States Army forces. It was later transferred by the Americans into Soviet captivity.
