= Infantry Division Potsdam =

- German: Infanterie-Division Potsdam
- Active: 29 March 1945 – 18 April 1945
- Country: Nazi Germany
- Branch: Heer (Wehrmacht)
- Type: Infantry
- Size: Division

Infantry Division Potsdam (German: Infanterie-Division Potsdam) was a German infantry division of the Heer during World War II. It was active for only a few weeks near the very end of the war, starting in late March 1945.

== History ==
Infantry Division Potsdam was part of the 35th and final Aufstellungswelle, along with the infantry divisions Schlageter, Jahn, Körner, Güstrow, Scharnhorst, von Hutten, and von Schill. The division was activated on 29 March 1945 on Truppenübungsplatz Döberitz training area in Wehrkreis III using personnel and students from military schools of various types of warfare. Following the order of battle of an Infantry Division 45, Infantry Division Potsdam was built on the basis of the 85th Infantry Division (with 1053rd and 1054th regiments), which had been destroyed in the Eifel mountain range in the aftermath of the Battle of the Bulge. Initially known as the "85th Infantry Division" from 29 March, it was renamed on 4 April to become "Infantry Division Potsdam", thus following other divisions of the 35th Aufstellungswelle in receiving given names rather than ordinal numbers. The division was additionally fed with personnel and materiel from the third and later the fourth detachment of the People's Artillery Corps 412 to supply the artillery, as well as the Jagdpanzer Company 1135 to supply the Panzerjäger detachment. The division's sole commander was a colonel-ranked reserve officer with the surname Lorenz.

In all, the division consisted of three infantry regiments that were built on the basis of the Grenadier Regiments 1053, 1054 and 1064 but were named Grenadier Regiment Potsdam 1 through 3. Additionally, the Division Fusilier Battalion 85 of the former 85th Infantry Division became the "Division Fusilier Battalion Potsdam". Additionally, there were the Panzerjäger Detachment Potsdam (formed from Jagdpanzer Company 1135), Artillery Regiment Potsdam (formed from People's Artillery Corps 412), Pioneer Battalion Potsdam (formed from Pioneer Battalion 185) and Signals Detachment Potsdam.

On 12 April 1945, Infantry Division Potsdam joined 11th Army at Blankenburg in the Harz mountain range, already under attack by Allied forces. By 18 April, Infantry Division Potsdam was already broken in combat; a weak leftover regiment joined the Infantry Division Scharnhorst as a fusilier battalion.
