= 377th Infantry Division =

- German: 377. Infanterie-Division
- Active: 31 March 1942 – February 1943
- Country: Nazi Germany
- Branch: Army (Wehrmacht)
- Type: Infantry
- Size: Division

The 377th Infantry Division (German: 377. Infanterie-Division) was an infantry division of the German army during World War II. It existed between March 1942 and February 1943.

== History ==
The 372nd Infantry Division was formed on 31 March 1942 as a division of the 19th wave of deployment. The division was initially headquartered in Le Mans in German-occupied France and supervised by the Wehrmacht's 7th Army under Army Group D. Its personnel was drawn from recruits and training units of five divisions of the 7th Army. The initial divisional commander was Erich Baeßler, who held this office until 14 December 1942.

Initially, the 377th Infantry Division consisted of three infantry regiments, an artillery regiments and division support units. Infantry Regiment 768 was formed from elements of 332nd Infantry Division, Infantry Regiment 769 used personnel of 333rd Infantry Division, and Infantry Regiment 770 involved members of 708th, 709th and 715th Infantry Divisions. Artillery Regiment 377 was formed using personnel across the five aforementioned divisions.

In summer 1942, the 377th Infantry Division was deployed to the Eastern Front, where it was initially attached to XXXXVIII Corps of 4th Panzer Army under Army Group South. It subsequently operated under XXIV Corps and XIII Corps.

During its time with the XIII Corps, the 377th Infantry Division was heavily involved in the fighting in the Voronezh sector during the Soviet Voronezh–Kastornoye offensive in January and February 1943. The war diary of the 377th Infantry Division ends on 25 February 1943, after the division had been rendered essentially incapable of military divisions. The remnants of the division were combined into a single regiment, the Grenadier Regiment 769, and subsequently attached to the 340th Infantry Division. While the 377th Infantry Division remained technically present in the distribution of the German military postal service until May 1944, the division had effectively ceased to exist by February 1943. Lieutenant General Adolf Lechner took command of the division on 14 December 1942. After he was reported missing in action at Voronezh on 29 January 1943, Lechner was succeeded in turn by Adolf Sinzenger, who led the division in its final month as a somewhat effective fighting force. Lechner's body was never recovered.

== Organizational chart ==
Organizational chart of 377th Infantry Division
Year	Month	Army Corps	Army	Army Group	Area of operations
1942	Apr./May	Deployment under Army Group D			Le Mans
1942	June	XXXXVIII	4th Panzer Army	Army Group South	Kursk
1942	July	XXIV	4th Panzer Army	Army Group South	Voronezh
1942	Aug./Dec.	XIII	2nd Army	Army Group B	Voronezh
1943	Jan./Feb.	XIII	2nd Army	Army Group B	Voronezh
1943	Mar./Apr. (remnants)	Army reserve	2nd Army	Army Group Center	Sumy, Kursk
1943	May/Aug. (Regiment 769)	XIII (under 340th Infantry Division)	2nd Army	Army Group Center	Sumy
