= 372nd Division =

372nd Division may refer to:

- 372nd Infantry Division, Wehrmacht, Germany
- 372nd Rifle Division, Soviet Union

== See also ==
- List of military divisions by number
- 372nd (disambiguation)
