= 231st Infantry Division (Wehrmacht) =

- 231. Infanterie-Division
- Active: August 1939 - July 1940
- Country: Nazi Germany
- Branch: Heer (Wehrmacht)
- Type: Infantry
- Size: Division

The 231st Infantry Division (German: 231. Infanterie-Division) was an infantry division of the German Heer during World War II.

== Operational history ==
The 231st Infantry Division was created on 26 August 1939 as part of the third Aufstellungswelle in Nuremberg in Wehrkreis XIII. It initially consisted of the Infantry Regiments 302 (Amberg), 319 (Regensburg) and 342 (Bayreuth), as well as the Artillery Regiment 231. The division's first and only commander was Hans Schönhärl.

The division operated in the Saar region as part of the 1st Army reserves. After the German capture of Warsaw it was transferred to occupied Poland, where it served as a frontier guard in the south of the German-Soviet demarcation line to prevent Soviet attacks during the timespan in which the main German forces were pinned down in the west. On 8 June 1940, it was organizationally part of the Oberost group (Grenzabschnittskommando Süd), along with the 228th and 311th Infantry Divisions. It served as part of XXXIV Army Corps. By 25 June 1940, it had been moved to Gen. z.b.V. II in Hanover to prepare for dissolution.

The 231st Infantry Division was disbanded on 31 July 1940, at Ohrdruf, Thuringia. During its entire lifespan, it had not once seen combat.

== Noteworthy individuals ==
- Hans Schönhärl, first and only divisional commander of the 231st Infantry Division.
