= 333rd Division =

333rd Division may refer to:

- 333rd Infantry Division, Wehrmacht, Germany
- 333rd Rifle Division, Soviet Union

== See also ==
- List of military divisions by number
