= 62nd Infantry Division (Wehrmacht) =

- 62. Infanterie-Division
- Unit insignia
- Active: August 1939 – August 1944
- Country: Nazi Germany
- Branch: Army (Wehrmacht)
- Type: Infantry
- Size: Division
- Nickname: Mondschein-Division ('Moonshine Division')
- Engagements: World War II: Operation Barbarossa; Battle of Kiev (1941); Second Battle of Kharkov; Case Blue

Commanders
- Notable commanders: Walter Keiner; Helmut Friebe; Helmuth Huffmann; Louis Tronnier

The 62nd Infantry Division (German: 62. Infanterie-Division) was an infantry division of the German Heer during World War II. It was formed in Wehrkreis VIII (Silesia) in August 1939. After heavy casualties in March 1944, it was first briefly reassembled in August 1944 and then reorganized into the 62nd Volksgrenadier Division, formed from units assembled for the planned 583rd Volksgrenadier Division, on 22 September 1944. The dissolution of 62nd Infantry Division was declared on 9 October 1944. 62nd Volksgrenadier Division remained operational until it was trapped in the Ruhr Pocket and forced to surrender by American forces in April 1945.

== Operational history ==
62nd Infantry Division was a division of the second Aufstellungswelle (wave of deployment), and was assembled, as was outlined in the German mobilization plans for the divisions of the second wave, from trained reservists after general mobilization was declared on 26 August 1939. The division was assembled at Kanth near Breslau. The first commander was Walter Keiner. The divisional insignia was a golden cross on top of a horizontal upward-facing crescent. As a result, it received the unofficial nickname 'Moonshine Division' (German: Mondschein-Division).

=== 1939 ===
For the Invasion of Poland that started on 1 September 1939, 62nd Infantry Division started out in the reserves of Army Group South (Gerd von Rundstedt), but did not see combat during the campaign. In October 1939, 62nd Infantry Division was assigned to VI Army Corps under 6th Army, then shifted to V Army Corps under 4th Army in December of that year.

=== 1940 ===
The 62nd Infantry Division stayed part of V Army Corps until May 1940, when, in anticipation of the imminent Battle of France, 62nd Infantry Division was moved to XV Army Corps under 4th Army, now assigned to Army Group A. In June, 62nd Infantry Division was transferred to V Army Corps, still under 6th Army, and thus moved army groups to Army Group B. After the German victory in France, 62nd Infantry Division was moved to occupied Poland and assigned to III Army Corps under 18th Army. It stayed under III Corps until April 1941. During that time, the corps shifted from 18th Army to 12th Army from September to December 1940.

=== 1941 ===
62nd Infantry Division was assigned to 17th Army from January to April 1941.

No case of sabotage may go unpunished.

— Walter Keiner (21 July 1941), Anderson 1997, p. 302.

From May to August 1941, 62nd Infantry Division was part of XVII Army Corps under 6th Army, and participated in the initial invasion of Operation Barbarossa as part of Army Group South. Along with its parent army corps, it initially advanced over Kovel and Sarny towards Korosten. The 62nd Infantry Division served with distinction during the encirclement of Kiev and distinguished itself with several days of very intense combat near Boryspil. During the fighting at Boryspol, 405 officers and soldiers were killed and another 487 wounded, with an additional 166 missing, all in the period of just 19 September until 24 September. The division was briefly transferred to the reserves during September 1941 as a result of the high casualties. Overall, the division had suffered 553 dead, 1,027 wounded and 182 missing over the course of September 1941, accounting for a casualty rate of 13% when compared to the divisional strength on 31 August. The division was briefly reassigned to XVII Army Group under 6th Army in October, before again being pulled to the reserves by November to serve in the army group's rearguard.

The rear area of Army Group South was not yet of elevated operational importance (the focus on the southern sector would increase as the focus of the Wehrmacht's operation was shifted towards the Caucasus in 1942 and 1943), but there were incidents of attacks by partisan groups against German supply lines. Although the Ukrainian people at large were initially either indifferent towards or even enthusiastic about the end of Soviet rule and the arrival of German forces, small groups of Red Army troops, communist functionaries, and NKVD-trained auxiliaries remained to deal damage against critical points that were of importance to the German war effort. Until October, overall activity by partisans was low and major singular acts of German military reprisals against local civilian populations were rare. (Note: The only major singular instance of a crime against humanity committed by German forces in the area until October 1941 was the mass execution of 63 male Jews, accused of sabotage of a local factory and of assistance to Soviet aircraft, in Chervone, carried out by units overseen by the 454th Security Division.) With the German capture of Kiev in late September, the partisan activity in northern and eastern Ukraine saw an uptick and posed an increased threat to the ever-growing rear area that Army Group South had to control. Three infantry divisions (Note: Next to 62nd Infantry Division, 24th Infantry Division and 113th Infantry Division were also called into the rear area to assist in anti-partisan warfare.) were pulled away from frontline duty to assist rearguard actions, among them the 62nd Infantry Division. The division had little prior experience in anti-partisan warfare before being assigned its task (although it had received and confirmed the Barbarossa decree). Initially, no immediate major actions were undertaken against civilians even when the division was faced by direct attacks by partisan units. (Note: There were at least two incidents of partisan actions that could have resulted in reprisals against civilians under the Barbarossa decree. On 14 August, partisans destroyed a bridge in the division's area of operations, and there were four armed assaults by partisan units against the divisions' fortified positions on 18 August. In both cases, the division abstained from any major acts of reprisal.)

This hands-off attitude persisted for the first few days of the division's presence in the area, but changed when the dead bodies of two German airmen, killed by partisans, were found on a bridge near Kamishnya on 19 October, followed by several partisan attacks over the next few days. The local commander at Myrhorod called upon the aid of the 62nd Infantry Division and specifically demanded acts of reprisal against the civilian population. Members of the 3rd battalion of 190th Infantry Regiment, part of 62nd Infantry Division, murdered the entire Jewish population of Myrhorod, along with a number of suspected partisans, on 28 October 1941. In total, 162 Jews and 45 non-Jews were killed in the Myrhorod area on that day. It was later given to protocol in the war diaries of the regional command that the Jews in question had been assisting partisan activity, but the war diaries of the units of 62nd Infantry Divisions contain no such references during the days leading up to the massacre on 28 October. On 9 November, a German soldier who had survived an ambush by partisans during the night of the 4th to the 5th of November, in which three of his comrades were killed, reached the positions of the 62nd Division and made report of his experiences. This incident was treated as a major massacre by the German leadership, and the rear area commander Erich Friderici instructed the 62nd Infantry Division to execute 'deterrent punitive actions against guilty local populations'. It was also the first order of its kind that didn't specify Russians, Jews and communists as targets of choice (thus leaving non-Jewish non-communist Ukrainians, perceived to be friendly to Germany, safe from reprisals). The III/190 battalion, which had already carried out the massacre at Myrhorod, reached the village of Baranivka to locate the bodies of the three deceased German soldiers whose deaths had caused this operation. After locating the dead bodies, the soldiers killed ten villagers and lit the village on fire. For the first time, the victims included ethnic Ukrainians, who had previously been safe from such executions. The same group of German soldiers was then involved in a skirmish against partisans on 12 November, when they were ambushed by a group of one hundred to two hundred partisans. Three German soldiers were killed and five wounded, and the surviving partisans, whose presence was suspected to have been the one that caused Myrhorod's initial call for aid, fled the area. However, that did not stop the 62nd Infantry Division's acts of reprisals against civilians. The population of the nearby village was accused of having assisted the partisan group, and all of the village's inhabitants were summarily executed and the village put to the torch.

At the same time that III/140 battalion was committing these acts, II/164 battalion was also actively looking for partisans. Starting with the execution on 10 November of six suspected partisans that had been denounced by a local, II/164 then proceeded to shoot a local guardsman. On 11 November, four hostages were taken in Mlyny in the hopes of acquiring more information about the partisans. Subsequently, more hostages were taken over the next few days, and 21 prisoners were summarily executed on 13 November. (Note: It is not clear from the divisional archives whether this number includes the four initial hostages.) This number came in addition of another 27 executions in the meantime, for a total of 49 suspected partisans killed between 10 November and 13 November. The commander of the battalion, Faasch, noted these 49 executions as the fulfillment of an army-ordered reprisal, although it is not clear what order he might have referred to. (Note: Faasch also pointed to the dilemma of Ukrainian peasants, who because of the German inability to permanently protect all villages were forced by partisans at gunpoint to obey their orders, and thus risked reprisal by the Germans, reducing their willingness to cooperate. Faasch suggested to solve this issue by installing tiny German presences supported by local Ukrainian auxiliaries in each village, to protect them permanently from partisan threats. The suggested strategy was however not applied.) The Battalion II/164, now part of 190th Infantry Regiment, was subsequently deployed again against partisans. On 23 November, a Jewish family of 23 was murdered by members of the seventh company of II/164 without a specified reason. A few days later, eight suspected partisans were summarily executed in Welibowka. On 30 November, the 62nd Infantry Division was instructed to prepare for its replacement in the area by Ersatzbrigade 202. One last act of reprisal against the locals was committed on 1 December, when thirty suspected bandits were summarily executed in forest north of Ssalowka. The lack of a report about a skirmish indicates that the alleged bandits had been taken prisoner without a firefight. The village was put to the torch. The 62nd Infantry Division reported in Poltava on 8 December and was formally returned to the Army Group reserves for frontline combat on 21 December.

=== 1942 ===
The division remained in reserve until February 1942, when the division was assigned to XXIX Army Corps under command of 6th Army. At this point, the Operations Division of OKH had issued a series of preliminary instructions for the campaigns throughout the year 1942 and had prioritized Army Group South, which 62nd Infantry Division was a part of, for reinforcements over the other army groups as the focus of the war shifted southwards. 20 German divisions and 21 Axis divisions from other countries joined the southern front sector for the upcoming operations. In May 1942, the division joined VIII Army Corps and then was moved to LI Army Corps in June, both under 6th Army. In this function, the 62nd Infantry Division participated in the major Axis victory at the Second Battle of Kharkov (12–28 May 1942) and the first phase of the subsequent Axis summer offensive ("Case Blue") of 1942.

In August, the division was reassigned to XXIX Army Corps, which was under the command of the Eighth Italian Army starting in September. In December, the division joined Armeeabteilung Hollidt.

=== 1943 ===
In March 1943, the 62nd Infantry Division was assigned to III Army Corps under 1st Panzer Army. It was moved to another corps within that army, XXX Army Corps, in April and remained there until September. In October, the 62nd Infantry Division was moved to LII Army Corps, before transfer to LVII Army Corps in November. Both of these corps were part of 1st Panzer Army when 62nd Infantry Division was assigned to them.

=== 1944 ===
LVII Army Corps, which 62nd Infantry Division was a part of, was moved from 1st Panzer Army to 6th Army in January 1944. As part of LVII Army Corps under 6th Army, the 62nd Infantry Division was mostly destroyed. The severely decimated division was merged with the 123rd Infantry Division from 13 March 1944 to form the so-called Korps-Abteilung F, which withdrew to Bessarabia and took up new positions on the Dniester to defend Romania. Korps-Abteilung F was again renamed the 62nd Infantry Division on 20 July 1944 and deployed as part of XXXXIV Army Corps under Army Group South Ukraine, but was then destroyed in the Soviet Second Jassy–Kishinev Offensive in late August. In November 1944, 62nd Volksgrenadier Division was formed.

== Noteworthy Individuals ==
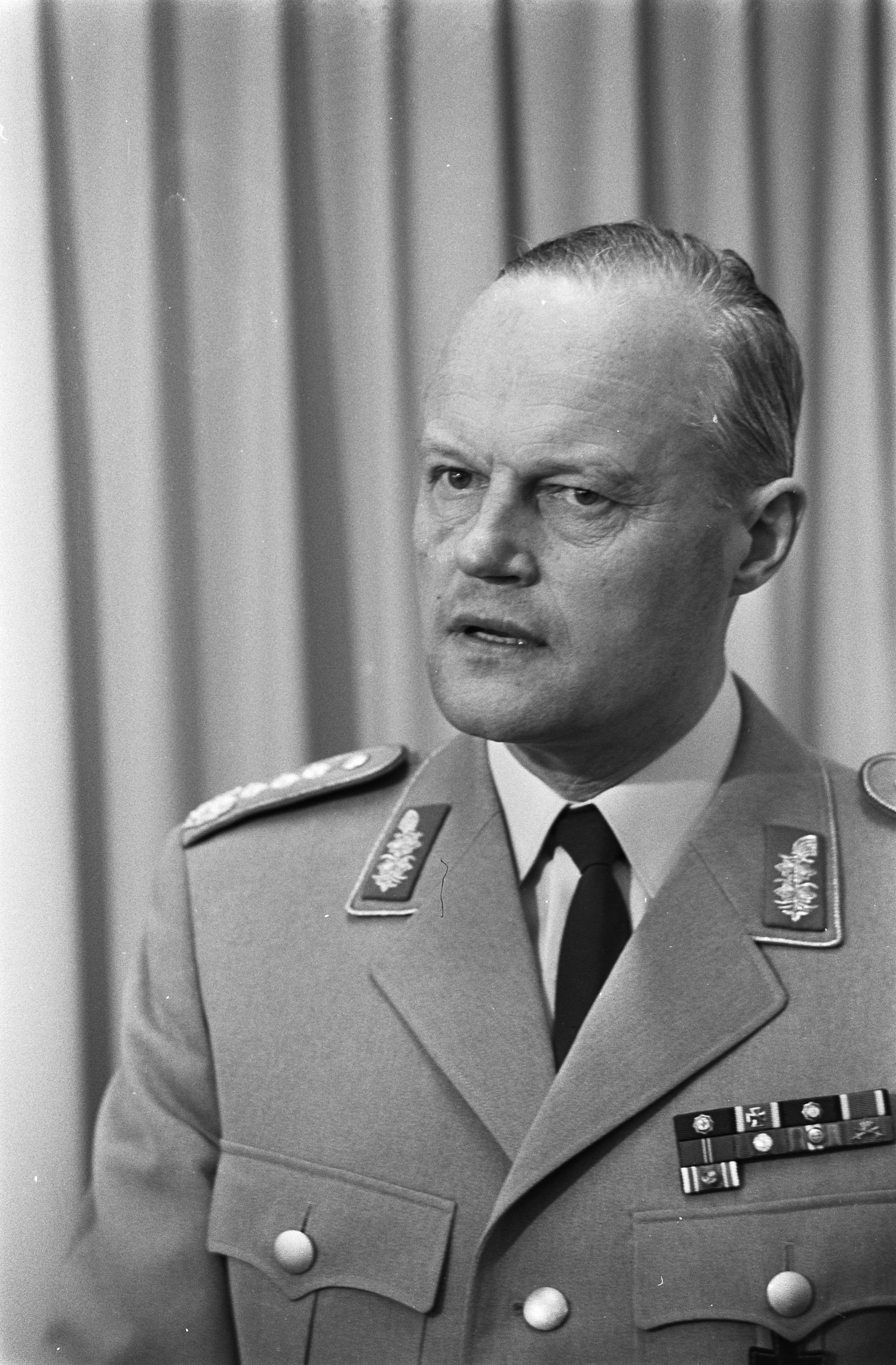
Jürgen Bennecke, who served as an adjutant in 62nd Infantry Division, during a press conference in 1968.

=== Divisional Commanders ===
- Walter Keiner: 26 August 1939 – 17 September 1941.
- Helmut Friebe: 17 September 1941 – 7 October 1941.
- Rudolf Friedrich: 7 October 1941 – 28 October 1942.
- Richard-Heinrich von Reuss: 28 October 1942 – 22 December 1942.
- Erich Gruner: 23 December 1942 – 30 January 1943.
- Helmuth Huffmann: 31 January 1943 – 2 November 1943.
- Knut Eberding: 3 October 1943 – 14 November 1943.
- Botho Graf von Hülsen: 15 November 1943 – 10 March 1944.
- Louis Tronnier: 10 March 1944 – 25 August 1944. (He was also commander of Korps-Abteilung F)

=== Others ===
- Jürgen Bennecke: German officer, later a Wehrmacht general and eventually Commander in Chief, Allied Forces Central Europe of NATO's Allied Joint Force Command Brunssum. Served as adjutant in 62nd Infantry Division.

== Historiography ==
Fragments of the divisional papers of 62nd Infantry Division (as well as 62nd Volksgrenadier Division and of Corps Detachment F) can be found in the German Federal Military Archive (Freiburg im Breisgau, Germany) under the signature RH 26-62.
