= Mary Paraskeva =

Greek amateur photographer (1882–1951)

Mary Paraskeva (Greek: Μαίρη Παρασκευά; née Gripari (Γρυπάρη), 1882–1951) was a Greek amateur photographer; her photographic legacy from the beginning of the 20th century is probably the earliest known by a Greek woman.

== Biography ==
Born on the island of Mykonos, Paraskeva was the daughter of shipping magnate Nicolas Gripari who had a prosperous export business in Odessa and a large estate at Baranovka in northwestern Ukraine. Paraskeva, who married the Greek engineer Nikos Paraskevas from Alexandria in 1903, started photographing from her late teens or early twenties.

== Photographs ==
Paraskeva's glass positives or lantern slides, most of them stereoscopic plates, include photographs of Greece, Egypt, France, Venice and the Alps. While they do not reflect the latest technical developments available, they are remarkably well preserved and of a high technical quality. They are also of considerable historical importance, especially in documenting life in Crimea before the Russian Revolution.

Many of Paraskeva's images were taken in the company of her friend Argine Salvago (1883–1972), also a photographer. Salvago's shots often include Paraskeva's remarkably contemporary-looking figure. The photographs of both Mary Paraskeva and Argine Salvago were rediscovered in the late 1990s. They were first revealed by Maria Karavia in her book Odissos, i lismonimeni patrida (Odessa, the forgotten homeland), Agra Editions, Athens 1998.

== Digitization ==
Most of the images taken by Mary Paraskeva have been donated by her great-nephew Petros Griparis to the Benaki Museum in Athens, where there are plans to exhibit them as digital prints.
