= 351st Division =

351st Division may refer to:

- 351st Infantry Division (Wehrmacht), Germany
- 351st Division (Imperial Japanese Army)
- 351st Rifle Division, Soviet Union
- 351st Artillery-Engineer Division, Vietnam

== See also ==
- List of military divisions by number
