= 89th Infantry Division (Wehrmacht) =

- German: 89. Infanterie-Division
- Active: 15 January – August 1944; September 1944 – February 1945; April/May 1945 (incomplete)
- Country: Germany
- Branch: Heer (Wehrmacht)
- Type: Infantry
- Size: Division
- Garrison/HQ: Milowitz
- Engagements: World War II; Operation Overlord; Battle of the Bulge

The 89th Infantry Division (German: 89. Infanterie-Division) was an infantry division of the German Heer during World War II.

== Operational history ==
The 89th Infantry Division was raised as part of the 25th deployment wave, along with the 77th, 84th, 85th, 91st and 92nd Infantry Divisions. It was first assembled at Truppenübungsplatz Bergen near Celle on 15 January 1944. Like the other divisions of the 25th wave, the 89th Infantry Division originally contained only two (instead of the standard three) infantry regiments. The initial regiments of the 89th Infantry Divisions were Grenader Regiments 1055 and 1056. The manpower of the 89th Infantry Division was raised from the remainders of Grenadier Regiment 1023 as well as the third battalion of Grenadier Regiment 1032, both parts of the Ersatzheer.

The division's initial military deployment happened in occupied Norway on 13 February 1944. The division was transferred to occupied France in late June 1944, in response to the Allied Operation Overlord. The division was trapped in the Falaise Pocket and subsequently destroyed. A new iteration of the division was then deployed under 7th Army as a division with three regiments. The additional regiment that joined the division was named Grenadier Regiment 1063. The division joined 5th Panzer Army in February 1945 and was again destroyed by Allied forces in the Eifel mountain range. Remainders of the division were then absorbed by the 326th Infantry Division.

A third deployment of the division was ordered by the high command of 19th Army on 8 April 1945 by merging of 1005th Brigade and Baur Brigade, but this new 89th Infantry Division was not realized due to the end of the war on 8 May 1945.
