= 311th Division =

311th Division may refer to:

- 311th Infantry Division, Wehrmacht, Germany
- 311th Rifle Division, Soviet Union
- 311th Air Division, United States

== See also ==
- List of military divisions by number
