= Erwin Rauch =

WW2 German Army general (1889-1969)

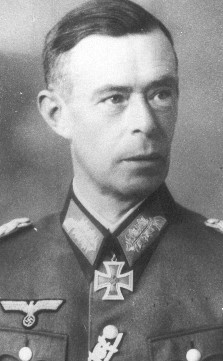
- Born: 19 October 1889; Berlin, German Empire
- Died: 26 February 1969 (aged 79); Kirchenlamitz, West Germany
- Military career
- Allegiance: German Empire; Weimar Republic; Nazi Germany
- Branch: German Army
- Rank: Generalleutnant
- Conflicts: World War II
- Awards: Knight's Cross of the Iron Cross

Erwin Rauch (19 October 1889 – 26 February 1969) was a German general in the Wehrmacht of Nazi Germany during World War II. He was a recipient of the Knight's Cross of the Iron Cross. Rauch surrendered to the American troops in September 1944 after the fall of Brest.

== Awards and decorations ==
- Knight's Cross of the Iron Cross on 22 December 1941 as Generalmajor and commander of 123. Infanterie-Division

Military offices
Preceded by General der Infanterie Walter Lichel	Commander of 123. Infanterie-Division; 6 August 1941 – 17 October 1943	Succeeded by Generalleutnant Erwin Menny
Preceded by Generalleutnant Erwin Menny	Commander of 123. Infanterie-Division; 1 November 1943 – 15 January 1944	Succeeded by Generalmajor Louis Tronnier
Preceded by Generalmajor Hermann Kruse	Commander of 343. Infanterie-Division; 1 February 1944 – 19 September 1944	Succeeded by None
