= 1st Marine Division (Wehrmacht) =

German naval infantry division during World War II (1945)

- German: 1. Marine-Infanterie-Division
- Active: 31 January 1945 – 8 May 1945
- Disbanded: 8 May 1945
- Country: Nazi Germany
- Branch: Kriegsmarine
- Type: Marines
- Role: Amphibious warfare
- Size: Division
- Garrison/HQ: Stettin
- Engagements: World War II: Battle of the Oder–Neisse; Battle of Berlin

The 1st Marine Division (German: 1. Marine-Infanterie-Division) was formed in January 1945 in Stettin from Marine-Schützen-Brigade Nord. Replacement troops were provided by 1. Marine-Infanterie-Ersatz- und Ausbildungs-Bataillon located in Lübberstedt. Activated from Kriegsmarine forces, it fought on the northern flank of the German line on the Oder river until the end of the war.

It was one of five naval infantry divisions of the German Wehrmacht (the others being the 2nd, 3rd, 11th and 16th Marine Divisions).

== Commanders ==
- Konteradmiral Hans Hartmann (Kriegsmarine) 31 January – 28 February 1945
- Generalmajor Wilhelm Bleckwenn (Army) 28 February – 8 May 1945

== Composition ==
- Marine-Infanterie-Regiment 1
- Marine-Infanterie-Regiment 2
- Marine-Infanterie-Regiment 4
- Divisions-Füsilier-Kompanie 1 (later became Battalion)
- Marine-Artillerie-Regiment 1
- Panzer-Jäger-Abteilung 1
- Marine-Feldersatz-Bataillon 1
- Marine-Pionier-Bataillon 1 (from April 1945)
- Marine-Nachrichten-Abteilung 1 (from April 1945)
