= Tronnier =

Tronnier is a surname of French origin. Notable people with this surname include:

- Ellen Tronnier (1927–2015), All-American Girls Professional Baseball League player
- Louis Tronnier (1897–1952), German Generalmajor in the Wehrmacht during World War II
