= 372nd Regiment =

372nd Regiment may refer to:

- 372nd Engineer General Service Regiment, United States
- 372nd Fighter-Bomber Aviation Regiment, Soviet Union
- 372nd Infantry Regiment, United States

== See also ==
- 372nd (disambiguation)
