= Erwin Menny =

German general and Knight's Cross recipient

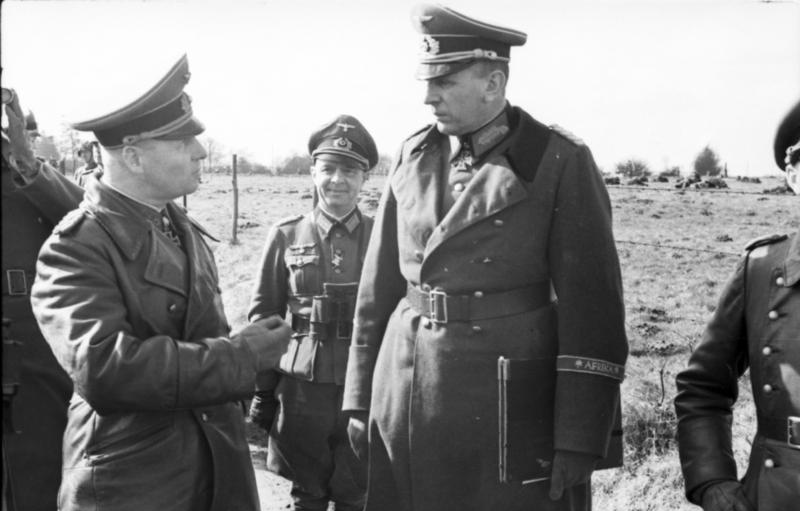
- Menny with Erwin Rommel, France March 1944
- Born: 18 August 1893; Saarburg, Lorraine, German Empire
- Died: 6 December 1949 (aged 56); Freiburg im Breisgau, Germany
- Military career
- Allegiance: German Empire; Weimar Republic; Nazi Germany
- Branch: Army
- Rank: Generalleutnant
- Commands: 15th Panzer-Division; 90th Light Infantry Division; 18th Panzer Division; 387th Infantry Division; 333rd Infantry Division; 123rd Infantry Division; 72nd Infantry Division; 84th Infantry Division
- Conflicts: World War II
- Awards: Knight's Cross of the Iron Cross

Erwin Menny (18 August 1893 – 6 December 1949) was a German general (Generalleutnant) in the Heer during World War II who commanded several divisions. He was a recipient of the Knight's Cross of the Iron Cross of Nazi Germany.

He was taken prisoner with his 84th Infantry Division in the Falaise Pocket on 21 August 1944.

== Awards and decorations ==
- Knight's Cross of the Iron Cross on 26 December 1941 as Oberst and commander of 15. Schützen-Brigade

== See also ==
Military offices
Preceded by Generalleutnant Walter Neumann-Silkow	Commander of 15th Panzer Division; 6 December 1941 – 9 December 1941	Succeeded by Generalleutnant Gustav von Vaerst
Preceded by Oberst Werner Marcks	Commander of 90th Light Afrika Division; 18 June 1942 – 19 June 1942	Succeeded by Oberst Werner Marcks
Preceded by Generalleutnant Karl Freiherr von Thüngen	Commander of 18th Panzer Division; 15 September 1942 – February 1943	Succeeded by Generalleutnant Karl Freiherr von Thüngen
Preceded by Generalmajor Wilhelm Crisolli	Commander of 333rd Infantry Division; 10 July 1943 – 2 November 1943	Succeeded by Unknown
Preceded by Generalleutnant Erwin Rauch	Commander of 123rd Infantry Division; 17 October 1943 – 1 November 1943	Succeeded by Generalleutnant Erwin Rauch
Preceded by Generalleutnant Philipp Müller-Gebhard	Commander of 72nd Infantry -Division; 1 November 1943 – 20 November 1943	Succeeded by Generalleutnant Hermann Hohn
Preceded by None	Commander of 84th Infantry Division; 10 February 1944 – 21 August 1944	Succeeded by Generalmajor Heinz Fiebig
