= 92nd Infantry Division (Wehrmacht) =

- German: 92. Infanterie-Division
- Active: 15 January 1944–20 June 1944
- Country: Nazi Germany
- Branch: Army (Wehrmacht)
- Type: Infantry
- Size: Division
- Engagements: Battle of Italy

The 92nd Infantry Division (German: 92. Infanterie-Division) was an infantry division of the German Heer during World War II.

== Operational history ==
The 92nd Infantry Division was raised as part of the 25th deployment wave. (Note: Other divisions of the 25th wave: 77th, 84th, 85th, 89th and 91st Infantry Divisions.) It was first assembled on 15 January 1944 in Wehrkreis XVII (Vienna) in the town of Nikolsburg. It, like the other divisions of the 25th wave, initially consisted of two rather than the standard three regiments. The two initial regiments of the 92nd Infantry Division were the Grenadier Regiments 1059 and 1060.

The 92nd Infantry Division was sent to Tuscany to participate in the defense against the Allied Italian campaign that had started in 1943. There, the division operated in loose formation and often in several individual combat groups in the Alban Hills until it was dissolved on 20 June 1944. The remaining resources of the 92nd Infantry Division were then used to replenish the strength of the 362nd Infantry Division.
