= Bruno Frankewitz =

German general

- Born: 8 December 1897; Tiefensee, Kreis Heiligenbeil, East Prussia, German Empire
- Died: 11 August 1982 (aged 84); Straelen, North Rhine-Westphalia, West Germany
- Military career
- Allegiance: German Empire; Weimar Republic; Nazi Germany
- Branch: Imperial German Army; Reichswehr; Army (Wehrmacht)
- Service years: 1914–1920; 1935–1945
- Rank: Generalleutnant
- Commands: 215. Infanterie-Division; Infanterie-Division Theodor Körner
- Conflicts: World War I World War II
- Awards: Knight's Cross of the Iron Cross with Oak Leaves

Bruno Frankewitz (8 December 1897 – 11 August 1982) was a German general during World War II who commanded the 215th Infantry Division. He was a recipient of the Knight's Cross of the Iron Cross with Oak Leaves.

Frankewitz was born in 1897 and entered the Imperial German Army in 1914 at the start of World War I. At the end of the war, he was a Leutnant of reserves and an artillery observer with an aerial balloon detachment. Due to the reductions in the peacetime Reichswehr, he left the military in 1920. In 1935, he rejoined the German Army. He was attached to artillery regiments until 1939 when he was made commander of Artillery Regiment 161. In November 1942, he became commander of the 215th Infantry Division, which he led until April 1945.

== Awards and decorations ==
- Iron Cross (1914) 2nd Class (7 August 1915) & 1st Class (27 January 1918)
- Wound Badge (1918)
  - in Black
  - in Silver
- Hanseatic Cross of Hamburg
- Knight's Cross with swords of the House Order of Hohenzollern
- Clasp to the Iron Cross (1939) 2nd Class (21 September 1939) & 1st Class (3 October 1939)
- German Cross in Gold on 1 April 1942 as Oberst in Artillerie-Regiment 161
- Knight's Cross of the Iron Cross with Oak Leaves
  - Knight's Cross on 29 February 1944 as Generalleutnant and commander of 215. Infanterie-Division
  - Oak Leaves on 16 March 1945 as Generalleutnant and commander of 215. Infanterie-Division

Military offices
Preceded by General der Infanterie Baptist Knieß	Commander of 215. Infanterie-Division; 12 November 1942 – 6 April 1945	Succeeded by None
Preceded by None	Commander of Infanterie-Division Theodor Körner; 6 April 1945 – 8 May 1945	Succeeded by None
