= Maximilian Wengler =

German Wehrmacht general

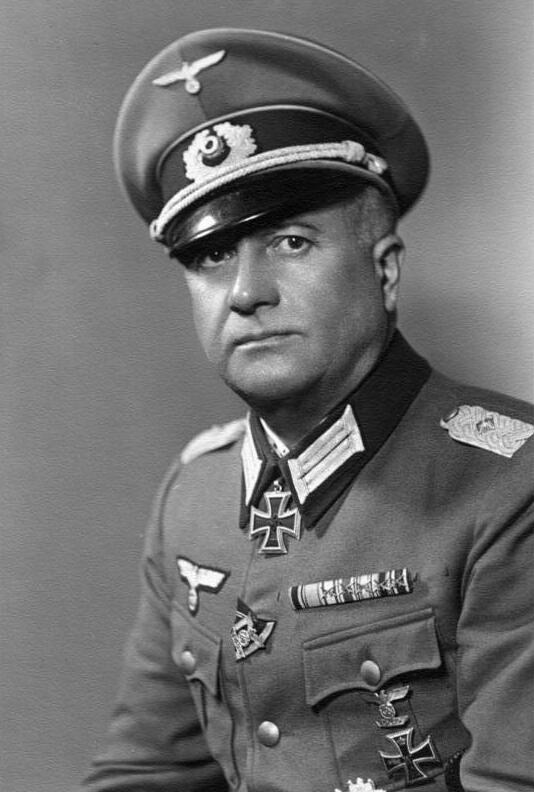
- Wengler in 1940
- Born: 14 January 1890; Roßwein, Saxony
- Died: 25 April 1945 (aged 55) near Pillau-Neutief
- Military career
- Allegiance: Nazi Germany
- Branch: Heer
- Rank: Generalmajor
- Commands: 227th Infantry Division
- Conflicts: World War I World War II
- Awards: Knight's Cross of the Iron Cross with Oak Leaves and Swords

Maximilian Wengler (14 January 1890 – 25 April 1945) was a German general in the Wehrmacht during World War II. He was a recipient of the Knight's Cross of the Iron Cross with Oak Leaves and Swords of Nazi Germany.

Wengler took command of the 83rd Infantry Division on 27 March 1945 in the area of Gotenhafen. The division, after escaping the encirclement of the city, fought its way to Oxhöfter Kämpe and Pillau-Neutief, where Wengler and members of his staff were killed by an aerial bomb on 25 April 1945.

== Awards ==
- Infantry Assault Badge in Silver
- Close Combat Clasp in Bronze
- Military Order of St. Henry (Knights Cross, 15 October 1914)
- Clasp to the Iron Cross (1939) 2nd Class (20 May 1940) & 1st Class (29 December 1940)
- Knight's Cross of the Iron Cross with Oak Leaves and Swords
  - Knight's Cross on 6 October 1942 as Oberstleutnant of the Reserves and commander of Infanterie-Regiment 366
  - Oak Leaves on 22 February 1944 as Oberst of the Reserves and commander of Infanterie-Regiment 366.
  - Swords on 21 January 1945 as Generalmajor of the Reserves and commander of the 227. Infanterie-Division

Military offices
Preceded by General der Artillerie Wilhelm Berlin	Commander of 227. Infanterie-Division; 7 June 1943 – 27 March 1945	Succeeded by —
Preceded by Generalleutnant Wilhelm Heun	Commander of 83. Infanterie-Division; 27 March 1945 – 25 April 1945	Succeeded by Oberst Hellmuth Raaatz
