= Heinz Fiebig =

WW2 German Army general (1897-1964)

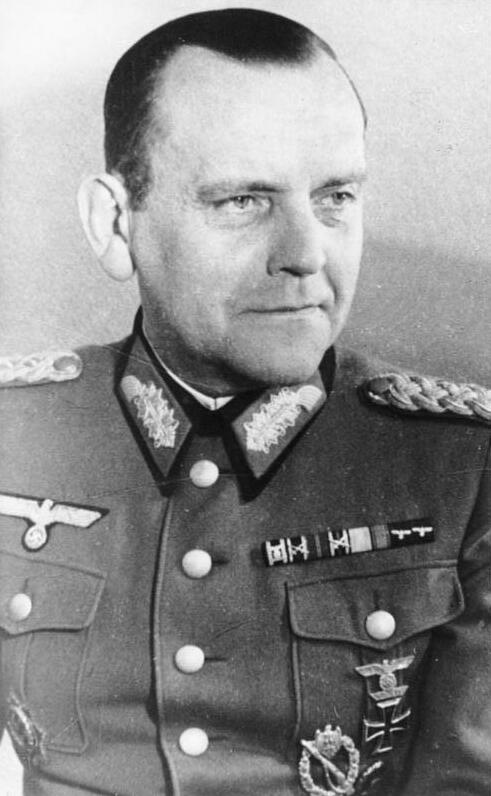
- Born: 23 March 1897
- Died: 30 March 1964 (aged 67)
- Military career
- Allegiance: German Empire; Weimar Republic; Nazi Germany
- Branch: Army
- Service years: 1914–1945
- Rank: Generalmajor
- Commands: 246th Infantry Division; 84th Infantry Division
- Conflicts: World War I World War II
- Awards: Knight's Cross of the Iron Cross

Heinz Fiebig (23 March 1897 – 30 March 1964) was a German general in the Wehrmacht of Nazi Germany during World War II who may have been a recipient of the Knight's Cross of the Iron Cross of Nazi Germany.

== Awards ==
- Nominated for the Knight's Cross of the Iron Cross on 8 May 1945 as Generalmajor and commander of 84. Infanterie-Division

Heinz Fiebig's nomination by the Heerespersonalamt (HPA—Army Staff Office) was ready for signature at the end of the war. According to the Association of Knight's Cross Recipients (AKCR) the award was presented in accordance with the Dönitz-decree. This is illegal according to the Deutsche Dienststelle (WASt) and lacks legal justification. The presentation date is an assumption of the AKCR.

Military offices
Preceded by Generalmajor Konrad von Alberti	Commander of 246. Infanterie-Division; 12 September 1943 – 5 October 1943	Succeeded by Generalleutnant Wilhelm Falley
Preceded by Generalleutnant Erwin Menny	Commander of 84. Infanterie-Division; 26 September 1944 – 8 May 1945	Succeeded by Oberst Siegfried Koßack
