= Battle of Kolberg (1945) =

Taking of the city of Kolberg during World War II

- Part of the East Pomeranian Offensive, Eastern Front of World War II
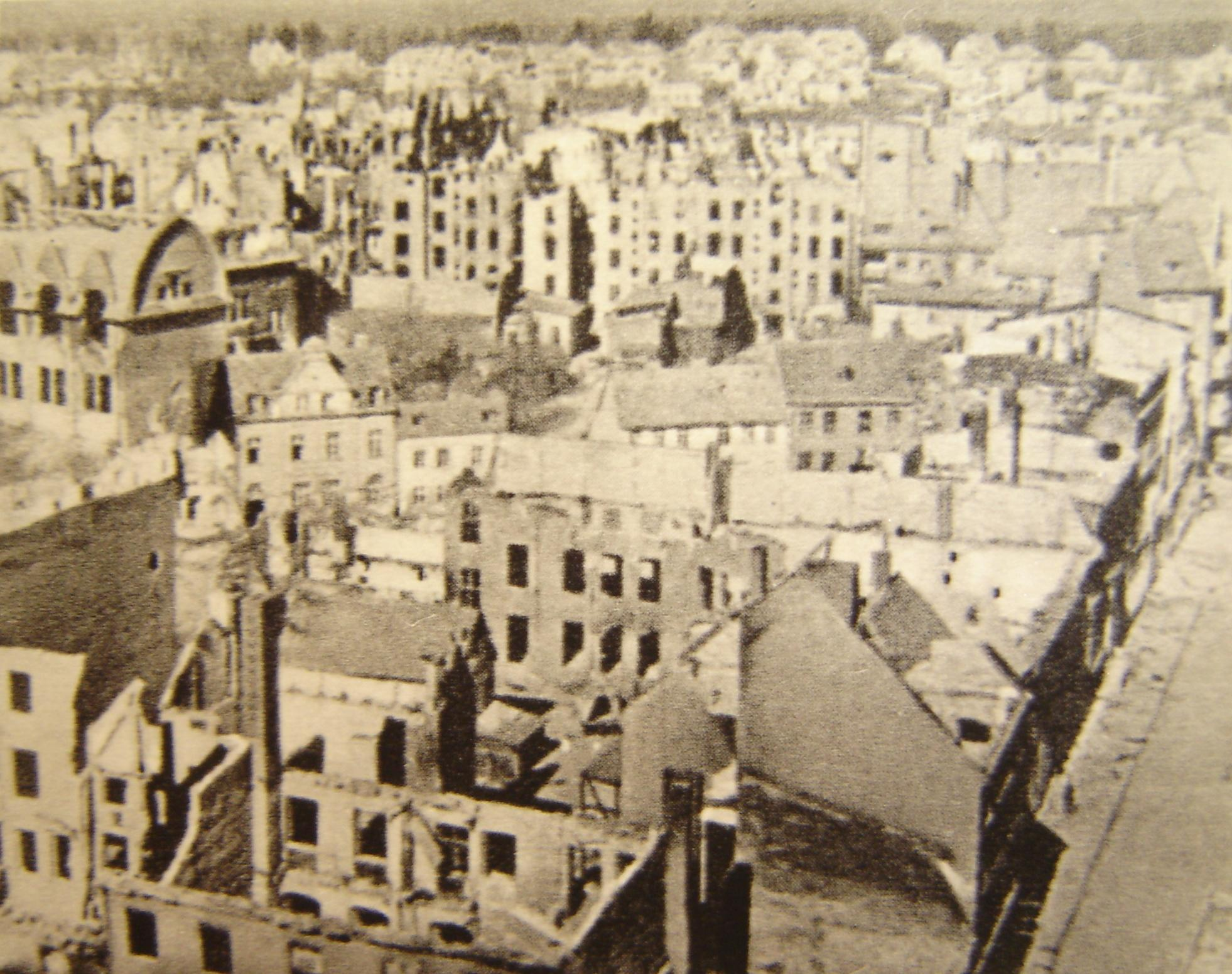
- Kołobrzeg in 1945.
Date	4–18 March 1945
Location	Kolberg, Pomerania, Germany (now Kołobrzeg, Poland) 54°10′33″N 15°34′25″E
Result	Polish-Soviet victory: German evacuation by sea; 80% of city destroyed

Belligerents
Germany	Soviet Union (Primarily until 7 March); Poland (From 8 March)

Commanders and leaders
(Nazi Germany) Ferdinand Schörner	(Poland) Stanislav Poplavsky

Units involved
Army Group Vistula: 15th Waffen Grenadier Division of the SS; 33rd Waffen Grenadier Division of the SS; Third Panzer Army; Volkssturm militia Kriegsmarine: 2 heavy cruisers; Admiral Scheer; Lützow	1st Belorussian Front: Red Army; 272nd Rifle Division; 45th Tank Brigade; First Polish Army; 3rd Infantry Division; 4th Infantry Division; 6th Infantry Division

Strength
8,000 – 15,000 personnel 18 tanks 1 armoured train 60 artillery pieces 2 heavy cruisers	28,000+ personnel (From 12 March)

Casualties and losses
KIA: unknown ~2,000 captured	1,206 killed and missing 3,000 wounded

Location of the Battle of Kolberg

The Battle of Kolberg or Battle of Kołobrzeg (also, battle for Festung Kolberg) was the taking of the city of Kolberg, now the city of Kołobrzeg, in Pomerania by the Polish Army and Soviet Army from Nazi German forces during the World War II East Pomeranian Offensive. Between 4 and 18 March 1945 there was major urban fighting of the Soviet and Polish forces against the German army for the control over the city. The Germans succeeded in evacuating much of their military personnel and refugees from the city via sea before it was taken by the Poles on 18 March.

== Background ==
On 4 March 1945 Kolberg, a large Baltic seaport in the Province of Pomerania, was designated a stronghold as Festung Kolberg. It was one of the key German positions in the Pomeranian Wall, a vital link between Pomerania and Prussia. The German High Command planned to use the seaport to supply nearby German forces, and hoped that the stronghold would draw off Soviet forces from the main thrust towards Berlin.

The Soviet East Pomeranian Offensive, commencing on 24 February 1945 managed to cut off and surround the city and its defenders (mostly from the German Army Group Vistula). The first commander of Festung Kolberg was an elderly officer, General Paul Herrmann, but due to illness he was transferred in February to a less demanding post. The command was taken by Colonel Gerhard Troschel. On 1 March the city was put under the command of a former Afrika Korps officer, Colonel Fritz Fullriede, after Troschel requested permission to surrender. Joseph Goebbels requested the change in command to maintain public perception around the newly released film Kolberg.

== Opposing forces ==
The German defence forces represented various formations from the Army Group 'Vistula,' some tasked with defending the fortress, others simply cut off in the Kolberg pocket. The most notable units included elements of the Third Panzer Army; the 33rd Waffen Grenadier Division of the SS Charlemagne (1st French) and the 15th Waffen Grenadier Division of the SS (1st Latvian). Estimates of the German defenders — including local militia and volunteers (Volkssturm) — range from 8,000 to 15,000, supported by some artillery (about 60 pieces), an armored train and about 18 tanks and a dozen support vehicles of various types. The German units also received some air and sea support (including artillery fire from pocket battleships Lützow and Admiral Scheer).

The Soviet and Soviet-allied Polish forces attacking the city can be divided into two waves: one of units of the Red Army, from 4 to 7 March, and one of units of the First Polish Army (from the 1st Belorussian Front), from 8 to 14 March, although some Soviet units took part in the combat after 8 March. The Soviet main units were the 45th Tank Brigade (engaged from 4 to 7 March) and the 272nd Rifle Division (6 to 9 March). The Polish units included: Polish 6th Infantry Division (from 7 March), Polish 3rd Infantry Division (from 9 March), Polish 4th Infantry Division (from 12 March), and various support units. The personnel of the Polish units numbered over 28,000.

== Battle ==
The first attack was led on 4 March by the Soviet units of the 1st Belorussian Front and 2nd Belorussian Front; with first Soviet units entering the city around 0800, but was repulsed. On the same day, the nearby city of Köslin (now Koszalin) fell and Soviets started to gather reinforcements to take Kolberg.

On 6 March the Soviet High Command decided to turn the siege of the city from the Soviet forces to its Polish allies. By 8 March the Soviets received reinforcements in the form of the units from the Polish People's Army, the Polish First Army under the command of Polish-born general Stanislaw Poplawski: the 6th, the 3rd Polish Infantry Division and support units. The Polish First Army was now tasked with taking the city; however their first attack was also repulsed. The German forces held stubbornly to the city, protecting the ongoing evacuation. Due to a lack of anti-tank weapons, German destroyers used their guns to support the defenders of Kolberg.

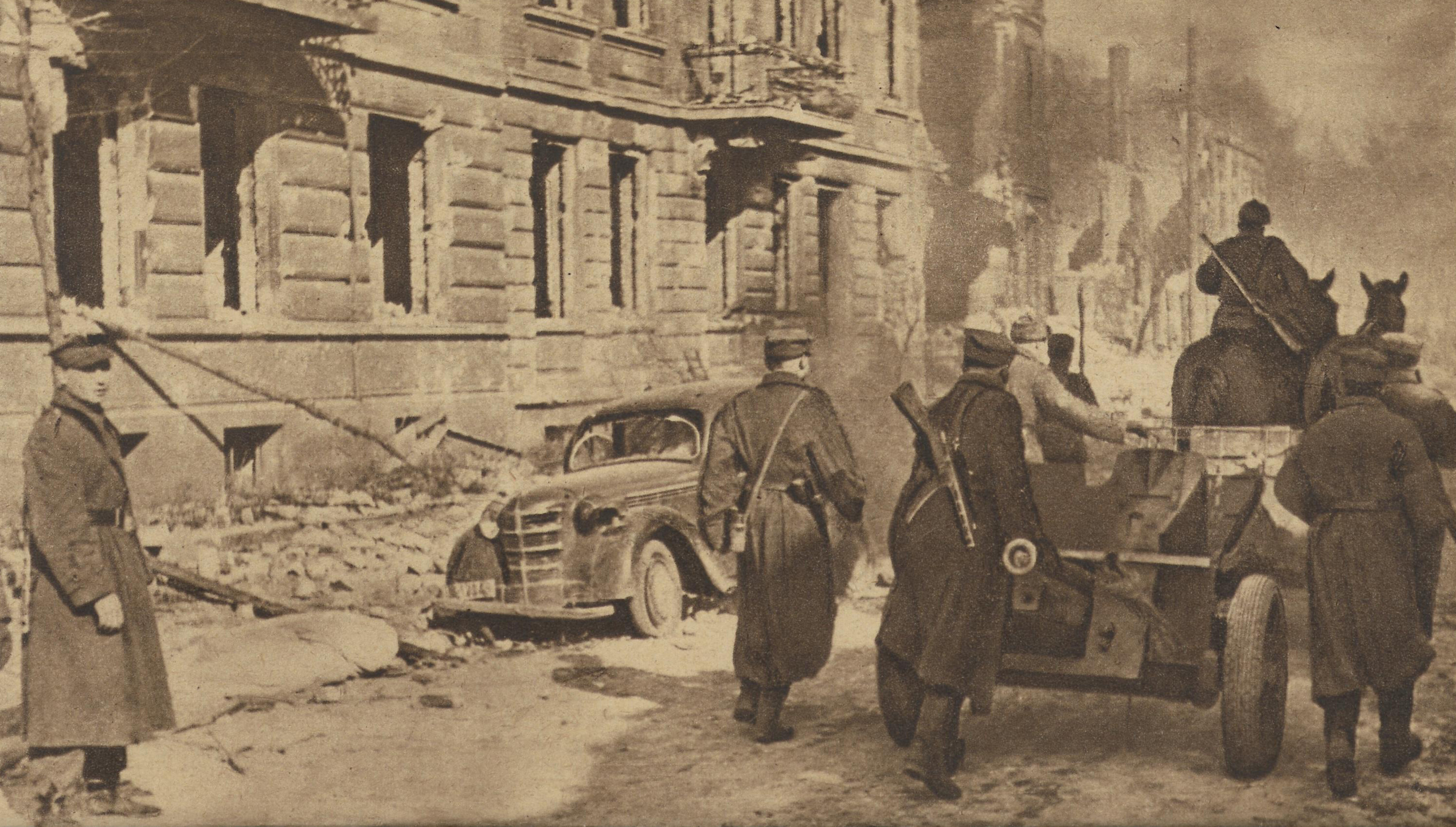
Polish artillerymen taking part in the assault on the port of Kolberg

On 12 March a new assault was launched, with heavy tanks, additional artillery units and the 4th Polish Infantry Division. The attack advanced but at the cost of very heavy casualties, and was broken off on 14 March. On 14 March, the Germans refused a Polish proposal to surrender.

On 15 March the fighting resumed and the Germans received reinforcements from Swinemünde (now Świnoujście) — the Kell battalions. However, they failed to stop the Polish forces, which took the barracks, part of the railway station and the Salt Island.

By 16 March the Germans pulled back most of their forces and concentrated on the defense of the port. The destruction of the collegiate church in Kolberg after heavy artillery shelling by katyushas allowed the Polish troops to breach the inner city. Polish forces assaulted the railway station (defended by a German armored train Panzerzug 72A, which was destroyed on 16 March), pharmaceutics factory and the horse riding arena.

On 17 March the Germans abandoned most of the defensive lines, leaving only a small number of troops to cover their retreat, and started to evacuate their main body of forces from the city. Polish forces took the railway station and reached the port, but most of the German troops managed to evacuate to Swinemünde (now Świnoujście). The last German stronghold was in the fort built near today's lighthouse on the coastline.

== Aftermath ==
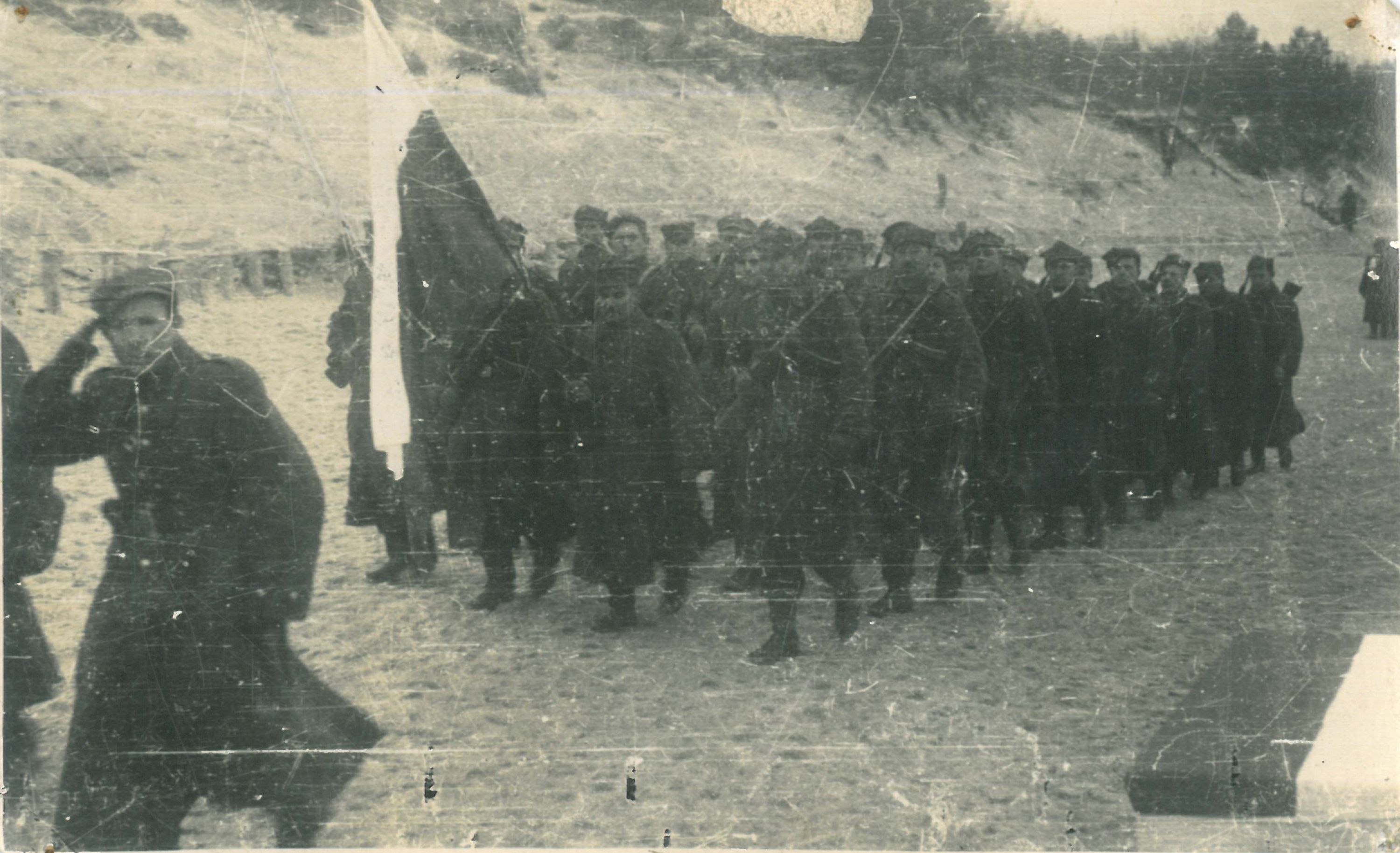
Parade of Polish soldiers of the 5th Heavy Artillery Brigade after the capture of Kolberg

Over 80% of the city was destroyed in the heavy fighting. The battle was among the most intense urban warfare the Polish army took part in. Polish casualties were estimated at 1,206 dead and missing, and 3,000 wounded.

On 18 March, the day the city fell, the Polish People's Army re-enacted Poland's Wedding to the Sea ceremony, which had been celebrated for the first time in 1920 by General Józef Haller (there was also a lesser-known ceremony on 17 March).

== Evacuation ==
With the Soviet forces approaching in 1945, valuable equipment, most of the inhabitants, and tens of thousands of refugees from surrounding areas (about 70,000), as well as 40,000 German soldiers were evacuated from the besieged city by German naval forces in Operation Hannibal. Only about 2,000 soldiers were left on 17 March to cover the last sea transports.

== In media ==
In 1945, the Polish Film Chronicle made a short film about the battle. In 1969, a movie was made in Poland, Jarzębina czerwona, with the battle for the city as its background. In 2005, a 25-minute Polish documentary film about the battle for the city was made.

Less than two months before the battle, a German propaganda movie, filmed in the city in 1944 and covering the 1807 siege of Kolberg, was released.

== See also ==
- History of Pomerania (1933–1945)
- East Pomeranian Offensive
- Kolberg, a 1945 Nazi-produced film about the 1807 battle, released only some five weeks before the 1945 battle's beginning.
