= Heinrich Götz =

German General

- Born: 1 January 1896
- Died: 31 January 1960 (aged 64)
- Military career
- Allegiance: Nazi Germany
- Branch: Army
- Rank: Generalleutnant
- Commands: 83rd Infantry Division; 21st Infantry Division
- Conflicts: World War II
- Awards: Knight's Cross of the Iron Cross with Oak Leaves

Heinrich Götz (1 January 1896 – 31 January 1960) was a German general during World War II. He was a recipient of the Knight's Cross of the Iron Cross with Oak Leaves of Nazi Germany.

== Awards and decorations ==
- Iron Cross (1914) 2nd Class (25 October 1915) & 1st Class (19 March 1917)
- Clasp to the Iron Cross (1939) 2nd Class (30 September 1939) & 1st Class (6 October 1939)
- Knight's Cross of the Iron Cross with Oak Leaves
  - Knight's Cross on 3 May 1942 as Oberstleutnant and commander of Infanterie-Regiment 466
  - 623rd Oak Leaves on 5 March 1945 as Generalmajor and commander of 21. Infanterie-Division

Military offices
Preceded by Generalmajor Wilhelm Heun	Commander of 83. Infanterie-Division; 28 June 1944 – 22 August 1944	Succeeded by Generalmajor Wilhelm Heun
Preceded by Generalleutnant Hermann Foertsch	Commander of 21. Infanterie-Division; 22 August 1944 – 25 September 1944	Succeeded by Oberst Hengersdorff
Preceded by Oberst Beyse	Commander of 21. Infanterie-Division; 14 January 1945 – 1 April 1945	Succeeded by Generalmajor Karl Koetz
Preceded by Oberst Borgmann	Commander of Infantry Division Scharnhorst; 8 April 1945 – 8 May 1945	Succeeded by None
