= 84th Infantry Division (Wehrmacht) =

- 84. Infanterie-Division
- Active: February 1944 – August 1944; September 1944 – March 1945
- Country: Nazi Germany
- Branch: Heer (Wehrmacht)
- Type: Infantry
- Size: Division
- Engagements: Operation Overlord; Falaise Pocket; Operation Varsity

Commanders
- Notable commanders: Heinz Fiebig

The 84th Infantry Division (German: 84. Infanterie-Division) was an infantry division of the German Heer during World War II.

== Operational history ==
The 84th Infantry Division was raised as part of the 25th deployment wave, along with the 77th, 85th, 89th, 91st and 92nd Infantry Divisions. The deployment of the 25th wave had been ordered on 9 January 1944 and was to use manpower of the Ersatzheer. Divisions of the 25th wave only received two instead of three regiments. The 84th was sent to France to serve under 15th Army of Army Group D, along with the 77th and 85th, whereas the 89th went to Norway, the 91st to Baumholder and the 92nd to Tuscany. Initially, the 84th Infantry Division consisted of the Grenadier Regiments 1051 and 1052. It was deployed on 2 February 1944.

The 84th Infantry Division, under 15th Army and Army Group B between May and July, was used as part of the German defense against the Allied Operation Overlord, which began on 6 June 1944, beginning on 29 July. and was destroyed in the Falaise Pocket on 20 August. The division was subsequently redeployed in the Kleve area as a division with three regiments around September. The third regiment, initially named Katzmann, was designated Regiment 1062 on 24 December 1944. This second iteration of the division was again destroyed by forces of the Western Allies at the Wesel bridgehead (Operation Varsity) and was intended to be subsequently redeployed once again in the Lüneburg Heath, but this third iteration of the division did not come to pass due to the end of the European war in May 1945.

== Noteworthy individuals ==
- Heinz Fiebig: Divisional commander of 84th Infantry Division at the end of the war.
