= Helmuth Huffmann =

- Born: 31 July 1891; Werden, German Empire
- Died: 9 December 1975 (aged 84); Bad Godesberg, West Germany
- Military career
- Allegiance: German Empire (to 1918); Weimar Republic (to 1933); Nazi Germany
- Branch: Army (Wehrmacht)
- Service years: 1912–1945
- Rank: Generalleutnant
- Commands: 62. Infanterie-Division; 277. Infanterie-Division
- Conflicts: World War I World War II
- Awards: Knight's Cross of the Iron Cross

Helmuth Huffmann (31 July 1891 – 9 December 1975) was a German general during World War II. He was a recipient of the Knight's Cross of the Iron Cross of Nazi Germany.

Huffmann was born in Werden in 1891. He entered the Royal Prussian Army before World War I and was an Oberleutnant in Field Artillery Regiment 107. He remained in the post-war Reichswehr as a career officer in the artillery branch. He was a battalion and regimental commander of artillery units between 1935 and 1942. During World War II, he commanded infantry divisions 62 and 277 between 1943 and 1944. He was the commander of the artillery school in Berlin from May 1944 to the end of the war in May 1945.

== Awards and decorations ==
- Iron Cross (1914)
  - 2nd Class
  - 1st Class
- Hanseatic Cross of Hamburg
- Wound Badge in black
- Honour Cross of the World War 1914/1918
- Iron Cross (1939)
  - 2nd Class
  - 1st Class
- German Cross in Gold (17 July 1943)
- Knight's Cross of the Iron Cross on 30 September 1943 as Generalleutnant and commander of 62. Infanterie-Division

Military offices
Preceded by Generalmajor Erich Gruner	Commander of 62. Infanterie-Division; 31 January 1943 - 14 November 1943	Succeeded by Generalleutnant Botho Graf von Hülsen
Preceded by Generalleutnant Karl Graf	Commander of 277. Infanterie-Division; 10 December 1943 - 15 April 1944	Succeeded by General der Nachrichtentruppen Albert Praun
