= 708th Infantry Division =

708th Infantry/Volksgrenadier Division
- German: 708. Infanterie/Volksgrenadier-Division
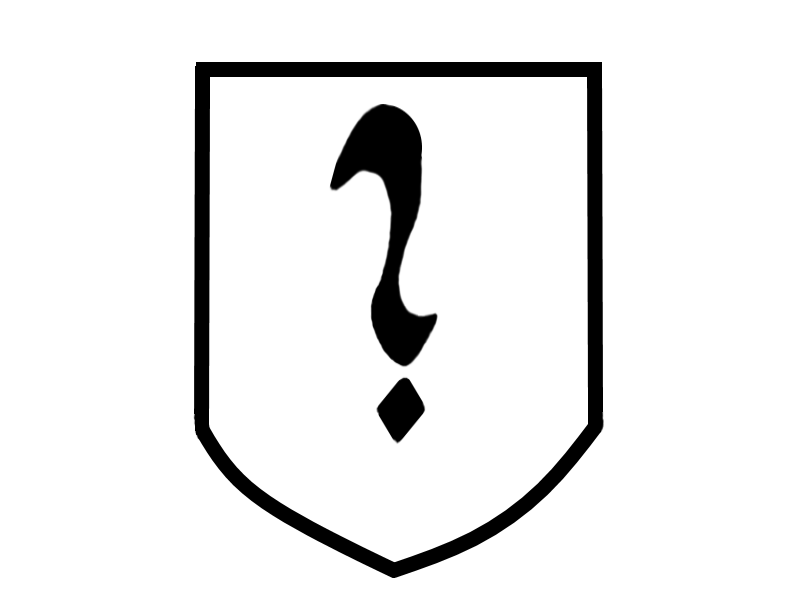
- 708. Volksgrenadier Division Vehicle Insignia
- Active: May 1941 – August 1944; September 1944 – February 1945
- Country: Nazi Germany
- Branch: Army
- Type: Infantry/Volksgrenadier
- Size: Division
- Engagements: World War II: Operation Overlord; Operation Northwind; Colmar Pocket

Commanders
- Notable commanders: Generalleutnant Edgar Arndt

The 708th Infantry Division (German: 708. Infanteriedivision), re-formed as the 708th Volksgrenadier Division (708th People's Grenadier Division, German: 708. Volksgrenadierdivision), was a German Army infantry division in World War II. It took part in Operation Northwind, where it was subsequently destroyed.

== History ==
=== Infantry ===
The 708th Infantry Division was created in February 1941 with men from the region of Metz and Strasbourg in Wehrkreis VIII, initially with two Infantry Regiments. Transferred to south west France as a static division in June manning on the coastal defenses in the Gironde / Bordeaux region. The 728. Infanterie-Regiment was in the Gironde estuary at Royan, the 748th at Lesparre in Médoc. The 360th is stationed at Soulac, Lesparre (Saint-Vivian)and at the Caserne Nansouty in Bordeaux. Both artillery battalions are in positions along the Gironde river (1) on 13 July the Division numbered 8123 men.(2)

The 708th division was split up on 2 July with the 360th regiment along with two fortress battalions and batteries remaining in the Gironde position under the command of Generalmajor Edgar Arndt. A new structure was formed on 13 July (3) and the field Division was appointed its former commander generalleutnant Herman Wilck. The division also received nine self propelled Marder 1 sdkfz 135 Panzerjager and twelve 88mm Anti tank guns from 2/AOK1 reserves at this time. The division commenced movement on 2 August by train and vehicles via Angers to the Mayenne and Sarthe region forming a triangle defensive position following the Mayenne River facing west defending the remaining non destroyed river crossing points. The northern most position was Domfront (Normandy), then south through Sept Forges, Ambrières, Ville Mayenne, and south to Laval then units were also placed in depth defending the national highway to Le Mans (German 7th Army HQ).

Most of the division was in place by the 5th, however the American task force Weaver of the 90th Infantry Division had already captured the important river bridge across the Mayenne river at Ville Mayenne on the morning of 5 August and formed a bridgehead driving deep towards Le Mans. The divisions 1st and 3rd battalions of 728th Regiment joined the counterattack on the breach flanks from the north as part of Kampfgruppe Oberst Coretti (Mayenne District Commander) on the 6th and 7th of August supported by the reconnaissance battalion Panzer Lehr, III battery Sturmgeschützbrigade 341, 1st Sicherungs Regiment, elements of flak Abteilung 496 and 124, a Radfahr battalion (30? or remnants of Osttruppen grenadier battalion 752?), Luftwaffe Landschutzen Kampfgruppe Lisieux, plus Kampfgruppe Reich from 9th Panzer Division. Over the next three days fierce night and street fighting between Aaron and Mayenne erupted which almost destroyed the Kampfgruppe with the remainder retreating towards Sille Le Guilliame and Domfront on 9 August.

Thirty Kilometers south Between the 5th and 6th of August heavy fighting occurred around Laval, a second breach and crossing of the Mayenne river occurred south at Laval by the 5th US Armoured, 105th Cavalry and 79th Infantry Division. Kampfgruppe Oberst Kutzen defending Laval and the Laval Luftwaffe airfield (elements of 91st Infantry Division, 17th SS, 708 Fusilier battalion, Flak Abteilung 842, 124 and members of the V &VI companies of Sicherungs Regiment 195) many were caught in a pincer movement and surrounded (1667 prisoners) with escaping units retreating towards Le Mans on the route National.

The division reorganised and prepared a new blocking line as more elements of the 9th Panzer arrived to defend Le Mans, again being savaged at Evron and Saint Suzanne (where majority of the artillery regiment was destroyed or captured) retreating through Sillé-le-Guillaume north towards Alençon, several hasty kampfgruppes were thrown together to prevent the breakthrough, however against overwhelming odds the front had collapsed by the 10th. On the 10th generalleutnant Herman Wilck was wounded when his car was destroyed by artillery fire and command fell to Oberst Bruno Gerlock and by 18 August much of the division was surrounded and surrendered (Gerlock was captured on the 19th)(5) . The remainder of the Divisions men escaped into the Falaise pocket and moved north to cross the Seine with the retreating German army.

The division's former commander, Generalmajor Arndt with his aides Hauptmann Wilhelm Schöps and Oberleutnant Arthur Jordan were captured on 24 August and executed by Free French Forces south of Troyes on 27 August at Chateau de Grogny, there bodies have never been found.

=== Volksgrenadier ===
The 708th Division was reactivated in September 1944 as a new Volksgrenadier division, reassembled from survivors of the destroyed 708th Infantry Division and the newly formed 573th Volksgrenadier Division. That Division had been formed on 25 August 1944 in Slovakia. Up to that point, none of the regimental or battalion commanders had ever commanded a regiment or battalion. The non-commissioned officers were largely drawn from the Luftwaffe, while the rank-and-file consisted of very young men and older soldiers who had previously been granted exemptions from military service (due to their civilian occupations). Twenty-five percent of the personnel in the rear-echelon services were Hiwis (auxiliary volunteers).
The 708th Volksgrenadier Division was placed under the leadership of Generalmajor Josef Krieger on 15 September.

The division was sent to occupy and defend Czechoslovakia from the Soviet advance. After two months, the division was sent to the western front as part of the LXIV Army Corps, with Generalmajor Wilhelm Bleckwenn taking over as commanding officer the following January. The division was destroyed the following month in the "Colmar Pocket".

== Order of battle ==
1941

- 728. Infanterie-Regiment
- 748. Infanterie-Regiment
- 658. Artillerie-Abteilung
- 708. Pionier-Kompanie
- 708. Nachrichten-Kompanie
- 708. Versorgungstruppen

1944

- 728. Grenadier-Regiment
- 748. Grenadier-Regiment
- 360. Festungs-Grenadier-Regiment
- 708. Divisions-Füsilier-Bataillon
- 658. Artillerie-Regiment
- 708. FlaK-Kompanie
- 708. Feldersatz-Bataillon
- 708. Panzerjäger-Kompanie
- 708. Pionier-Bataillon
- 708. Nachrichten-Abteilung
- 708. Versorgungstruppen

13th July 1944

- 728. Grenadier-Regiment I & II Abteilung, 8kp grenadiers, XIV Kp 3x7.5cm AT, 3x5cm AT
- 748. Grenadier-Regiment I &II Abteilung, 8Kp grenadiers, XIV Kp 3x7.5cm AT, 2x4.7cm AT
- 708. Divisions-Füsilier-Bataillon 4Kp grenadiers
- 658. Artillerie-Regiment

I Abteilung 16x French Schneider 105mm horse drawn (second Company vehicles). II Abteilung 12 x 7.62cm IKH 290(r) in II./1708 Art 76 mm M1927 regimental guns were placed into service as the 7.62 cm Infanteriekanonehaubitze 290(r), horse drawn. 8 x 12.2cm sFH 396(r) (russian) horse drawn.

- 708. FlaK-Kompanie 2 Kp 9 x 2cm flak
- 708. Feldersatz-Bataillon
- 708. Panzerjäger-Kompanie 1.Pz.Kp 9 x Marder I sdkfz 135, 2.Pz.Kp. (mot. Z) with 5 x 8.8 cm anti-aircraft guns (assigned from AOK1)

3.Pz.Kp. with 12 x 2cm anti-aircraft guns on self-propelled gun

- 708. Pionier-Bataillon 3 Kompanie motorised
- 708. Nachrichten-Abteilung
- 708. Versorgungstruppen

== Commanders ==
- Generalmajor (Colonel/Major General) Walter Drobnig (3 May 1941 – 1 March 1942)
- Generalleutnant (Lieutenant General) z.V. Hermann Wilck (1 March 1942 – 30 July 1943)
- Generalmajor (Major General) Edgar Arndt (30 July 1943 – 24 August 1944 or 30 August 1943) (killed in action near Troyes, France)
- Generalleutnant z.V. Hermann Wilck (13 July 1944 – 10 August 1944) (WIA)
- Oberst (Colonel) Bruno Gerloch (Acting commander, 10–19 August 1944)
- Colonel Wilhelm Bleckwenn (November 1944 – February 1945)

== Operations Officers ==
- Major Wilhelm Breidenstein (Sep 1943 - Feb 1944)
- Oberstleutnant Heinz-Joachim Mueller-Lamkow (Feb 1944 - Aug 1944)

== See also ==
- List of German divisions in World War II
