= Rudolf Bacherer =

German officer and Knight's Cross recipient

- Born: 19 June 1895; Pforzheim
- Died: 6 July 1964 (aged 69); Bad Krozingen
- Military career
- Allegiance: Nazi Germany
- Branch: Army
- Service years: 1914–1919; 1935–1945
- Rank: Oberst
- Commands: Grenadier-Regiment 1049
- Conflicts: Battle of Saint Malo
- Awards: Knight's Cross of the Iron Cross with Oak Leaves

Rudolf Gustav Moritz Bacherer (19 June 1895 – 6 July 1964) was a German officer during World War II who held several regimental commands. He was also a recipient of the Knight's Cross of the Iron Cross with Oak Leaves.

In June 1944 Bacherer was commanding the 1049th Infantry Regiment on the Western Front when Major General Rudolf Stegmann, commander of the 77th Infantry Division was killed in an American air raid (18 June). Bacherer was promoted to command the division and enjoyed some early successes, capturing 250 American prisoners on 17 June and the following day broke through US lines to link up with the remnants of the LXXXIV Corps near La Haye-du-Puits. The Division however, which was already understrength when Bacherer made his advance soon suffered heavy losses as the Americans forged ahead. Bacherer was captured by American forces following the fall of Saint-Malo (17 August 1944) and was held as a POW until July 1947.

His son Günther (* 1923) had to do military service and died in 1945.

== Awards ==
- Iron Cross (1914) 2nd Class
- Iron Cross (1914) 1st Class
- German Cross in Gold on 29 January 1942 as Rittmeister in Aufklärungs-Abteilung 156
- Knight's Cross of the Iron Cross with Oak Leaves
  - Knight's Cross on 30 October 1943 as Oberst and commander of Grenadier-Regiment 234
  - 550th Oak Leaves on 11 August 1944 as Oberst and commander of Grenadier-Regiment 1049
