= 123rd Infantry Division (Wehrmacht) =

- 123. Infanterie-Division
- Active: 5 October 1940 – 1 March 1944
- Disbanded: 1 March 1944
- Country: Nazi Germany
- Branch: Army
- Type: Infantry

123rd Infantry Division (123. Infanterie-Division) was a unit of the Wehrmacht during World War II.

== Commands and operational areas ==
Datum	Corps	Army	Army Group	Operational Area
November 1940	XX.	11. Armee	C	Brandenburg
April 1941	X.	18. Armee	B	East Prussia
May 1941	XXVIII.	16. Armee	C	East Prussia
June 1941	XXVIII.	16. Armee	North	Sebesch
August 1941	II.	16. Armee	North	Demjansk
January 1943	II.	16. Armee	North	Demjansk, Cholm
September 1943	Reserve	16. Armee	North	Cholm
October 1943	XVII.	1. Panzer-Armee	South	Zaporizhia
January 1944	XVII.	6. Armee	South	Zaporizhia
February 1944	XXX.	6. Armee	South	Zaporizhia
March 1944	LVII.	6. Armee	A	Kryvyi Rih

== Composition ==
- Infanterie-Regiment 415
- Infanterie-Regiment 416
- Infanterie-Regiment 418
- Artillerie-Regiment 123
- Pionier-Bataillon 123
- Feldersatz-Bataillon 123
- Panzerjäger-Abteilung 123
- Aufklärungs-Abteilung 123
- Nachrichten-Abteilung 123
- Divisions-Nachschubführer 123

== Personnel ==
=== Commanders ===
Date	Rank	Name
5 October 1940	Generalleutnant	Walter Lichel
6 August 1941	Generalleutnant	Erwin Rauch
1. Oktober 1943	Generalleutnant	Erwin Menny
1. November 1943	Generalleutnant	Erwin Rauch
15. Januar 1944	Generalmajor	Louis Tronnier

=== Chiefs of Staff ===
Date	Rank	Name
10 October 1940	Major	Ernst Klasing
30 November 1942	Oberstleutnant	Hans Linemann

== Bibliography ==
- (in German) Werner Haupt: Demjansk – Ein Bollwerk im Osten, Bad Nauheim 1963.
- (in German) Werner Haupt: Heeresgruppe Nord, Bad Nauheim 1967.
- (in German) Franz Kurowski: Demjansk – Der Kessel im Eis, Wölfersheim-Berstadt 2001.
- Tessin, Georg (1972). "Die Landstreitkräfte 71 – 130" [Ground forces 71 to 130]. Verbände und Truppen der deutschen Wehrmacht und Waffen–SS im Zweiten Weltkrieg 1939–1945 (in German). Vol. 6. Osnabrück: Biblio. ISBN 3-7648-0872-1.
