= Walter Keiner =

German general (1890–1978)

- Born: 30 December 1890; Benshausen, German Empire
- Died: 23 January 1978 (aged 87); Gelnhausen, West Germany
- Military career
- Allegiance: German Empire (to 1918); Weimar Republic (to 1933); Nazi Germany
- Branch: Army
- Service years: 1910–1945
- Rank: General of the Artillery
- Commands: 62nd Infantry Division
- Conflicts: World War I ---- World War II: Invasion of Poland; Battle of France; Operation Barbarossa; Battle of Kiev (1941)
- Awards: Knight's Cross of the Iron Cross

Walter Keiner (30 December 1890 – 23 January 1978) was a general in the Wehrmacht of Nazi Germany during World War II. He was a recipient of the Knight's Cross of the Iron Cross.

== Awards and decorations ==
- Knight's Cross of the Iron Cross on 17 July 1941 as Generalleutnant and commander of 62. Infanterie-Division

Military offices
Preceded by None	Commander of 62. Infanterie-Division; 26 August 1939 – 17 September 1941	Succeeded by Generalleutnant Rudolf Friedrich
