= 3rd Marine Division (Wehrmacht) =

German naval infantry division during World War II (1945)

- German: 3. Marine-Infanterie-Division
- Active: April – May 1945
- Country: Nazi Germany
- Branch: Kriegsmarine
- Type: Marines
- Role: Amphibious warfare
- Size: Division
- Engagements: World War II

Commanders
- Commander: Fritz Fullriede

The 3rd Marine Division (German: 3. Marine-Infanterie-Division) was a short-lived division of the marine corps of Nazi Germany's navy, the Kriegsmarine. It existed only in April and May 1945.

== History ==
The 3rd Marine Division was formed on 1 April 1945 in the region of Pomerania using personnel of the former 163rd Infantry Division, which had been smashed in Pomerania as part of the 3rd Panzer Army in March 1945. The creation of the division happened on the background of the rapid advances by the Allies, especially the Red Army, on all fronts. Through Directive No. 1754/43 by the Wehrmacht leadership staff, the division was designated to receive its reinforcements from the naval personnel of the Kriegsmarine. The divisional organization followed the "Infantry Division 45" style. After division command was briefly held by Colonel Witzleben, command went on 3 April to Fritz Fullriede.

The 3rd Marine Division was structured into three infantry regiments, variously referred to as "Naval Infantry Regiment" (Marine-Infanterie-Regiment) or "Naval Grenadier Regiment" (Marine-Grenadier-Regiment), numbered 8 through 10. These regiments were likely built on the remnants of the Grenadier Regiments 307, 310 and 324, the three former regiments of the 163rd Infantry Division. Additionally, the 3rd Marine Division was to be staffed with a Naval Artillery Regiment (built on the remnants of the 163rd Division's former Artillery Regiment 234), though the realization of its deployment seems unlikely.

The division was deployed to the "fortress" of Swinemünde in April 1945, then withdrew via the Sachsenhausen Bridgehead (in Frankfurt/Oder) to Lindow north of Berlin. On 28 April, the formation of the 21st Army to take over the right wing of the 3rd Panzer Army resulted in the takeover of the III SS Panzer Corps with the 3rd Marine Division, 7th Panzer Division and 25th Panzergrenadier Division. At Kyritz, the division surrendered to the Red Army after the end of the Battle of Berlin.
