= Karl Koetz =

German Officer

- Born: 8 February 1908
- Died: 11 June 1977 (aged 69)
- Military career
- Allegiance: Nazi Germany
- Branch: Army (Wehrmacht)
- Rank: Generalmajor
- Commands: 349th Infantry Division; 21st Infantry Division
- Conflicts: World War II
- Awards: Knight's Cross of the Iron Cross with Oak Leaves

Karl Koetz (8 February 1908 – 11 June 1977) was a general in the Wehrmacht of Nazi Germany during World War II. He was a recipient of the Knight's Cross of the Iron Cross with Oak Leaves.

== Awards and decorations ==
- Iron Cross (1939) 2nd Class (13 June 1940) & 1st Class (1 July 1941)
- Knight's Cross of the Iron Cross with Oak Leaves
  - Knight's Cross on 2 October 1941 as Hauptmann and commander of II. / Infanterie-Regiment 46
  - Oak Leaves on 1 January 1944 as Oberstleutnant and commander of Grenadier-Regiment 185

Military offices
Preceded by None	Commander of 349. Volksgrenadier-Division; 11 September 1944 – 1 April 1945	Succeeded by None
Preceded by Generalmajor Heinrich Götz	Commander of 21. Infantrie-Division; 1 April 1945 – 8 May 1945	Succeeded by —
