= Infantry Division Güstrow =

- Infanterie-Division Güstrow
- Active: 29 April 1945 – May 1945
- Country: Nazi Germany
- Branch: German Army
- Type: Infantry

Infantry Division Güstrow (German: Infanterie-Division Güstrow) was an infantry division of the German Wehrmacht during World War II. Its assembly in late April 1945 was undertaken too late to impact the war, and the division never saw combat.

== History ==
The Infantry Division Güstrow was officially created on 29 April 1945, within two weeks of the end of the war upon German surrender on 8/9 May 1945. It was the fourth division raised as an emergency measure from among the remaining members of the Reich Labour Service (RAD). The division was earmarked to receive support from the Replenishment Regiment 696 of the 340th Infantry Division, which had been destroyed in the Hunsrück mountains and whose staff had already been used for another emergency formation in the final weeks of the war, Infantry Division Scharnhorst), as well as the Fahnenjunker School VI at Schwerin and the Güstrow course of battalion leader trainees. The division was planned to receive three grenadier regiments with two battalions each, an artillery regiment with four detachment, a Panzerjäger detachment with one company, a division fusilier battalion, a Nebelwerfer detachment with one company, a pioneer battalion, a signals detachment with one company, and a field replacement battalion. The division never reached combat readiness, and was taken prisoner by British forces in Mecklenburg.

The division's sole commander was a colonel-ranked officer named Ernst Nobis.
