= Walter Lichel =

- Born: 1 May 1885; Stolp, German Empire, modern Poland
- Died: 10 December 1969 (aged 84); Bärnau, Germany
- Military career
- Allegiance: Nazi Germany
- Branch: Army (Wehrmacht)
- Rank: General of the Infantry
- Commands: 3rd Infantry Division; 123. Infanterie-Division
- Conflicts: World War II
- Awards: Knight's Cross of the Iron Cross

Walter Lichel (1 May 1885 – 10 December 1969) was a German general during World War II and recipient of the Knight's Cross of the Iron Cross of Nazi Germany. Lichel surrendered to the Allied troops in 1945 and was held until 1947.

== Awards ==
- Knight's Cross of the Iron Cross on 18 September 1941 as Generalleutnant and commander of 123. Infanterie-Division

== Bibliography ==
- Fellgiebel, Walther-Peer (2000) [1986]. Die Träger des Ritterkreuzes des Eisernen Kreuzes 1939–1945 — Die Inhaber der höchsten Auszeichnung des Zweiten Weltkrieges aller Wehrmachtteile [The Bearers of the Knight's Cross of the Iron Cross 1939–1945 — The Owners of the Highest Award of the Second World War of all Wehrmacht Branches] (in German). Friedberg, Germany: Podzun-Pallas. ISBN 978-3-7909-0284-6.

Military offices
Preceded by Generalmajor Walter Petzel	Commander of 3. Infanterie-Division; 11 October 1938 – 1 October 1940	Succeeded by General der Artillerie Paul Bader
Preceded by None	Commander of 123. Infanterie-Division; 5 October 1940 - 5 August 1941	Succeeded by Generalleutnant Erwin Rauch
