= Fritz Fullriede =

German war criminal (1895 - 1969)

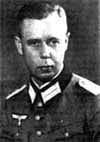
- Born: 4 January 1895; Bremen, German Empire
- Died: 3 November 1969 (aged 74); Bad Oldesloe, Schleswig-Holstein, West Germany
- Military career
- Allegiance: German Empire; Weimar Republic; Nazi Germany
- Branch: Army
- Service years: 1914–1945
- Rank: Generalmajor
- Conflicts: World War I World War II
- Awards: Knight's Cross of the Iron Cross with Oak Leaves

Fritz Fullriede (4 January 1895 – 3 November 1969) was a German officer and war criminal during World War II. Fullriede fought in the German invasion of Poland, on the Eastern Front, in the Afrika Korps and the Italian Campaign. The last commander of Festung Kolberg, Fullriede received the Knight's Cross of the Iron Cross with Oak Leaves in 1945. Fullfriede's capable defense of Kolberg allowed 70,000 civilians and 40,000 military personnel to evacuate Kolberg via sea route to other parts of Germany. After the war, Fullriede was tried and convicted by a Dutch court for his role in the Putten raid of 1944. He was sentenced to 2.5 years in prison.

== Awards ==
- Iron Cross (1914) 2nd Class (25 August 1917)
- Wound Badge (1918) in Black (20 July 1918)
- Hanseatic Cross of Bremen (25 July 1918)2nd Class (7 July 1941)
- Iron Cross (1939) 1st Class (23 October 1941)
- Wound Badge (1939) in Gold (20 August 1941)
- Knight's Cross of the Iron Cross with Oak Leaves
  - Knight's Cross on 11 April 1943 as Oberstleutnant and commander of Kampfgruppe Fullriede in the Panzer AOK 5
  - 803rd Oak Leaves on 23 March 1945 as Oberst and commander of the fortress Kolberg
