= Infantry Division Theodor Körner =

WW II German Infantry division

The "Theodor Körner" Infantry Division was a German army infantry division during World War II. The unit consisted mainly of members of the Reich Labour Service (RAD) and existed in April and May 1945.

== Division history ==
The later RAD Division No. 3 "Theodor Körner" was converted into Infantry Division z.b.V. 3 in the course of the 35th (and last) Aufstellungswelle on 4 April 1945. The staff came from the staff of the disbanded 215th Infantry Division, the men from the RAD of Wehrkreis III gathered in the Döberitz military training area. It comprised around 10,000 men, with around 7,500 men being provided by the RAD. The division was renamed after Theodor Körner a short time later.

The Division was moved to the Mulde River and was later added to the XX Army Corps, deployed under the 12th Army south of Berlin against Allied and Soviet troops.

On 26 April, the last German offensive operation in World War II took place near Beelitz with the following formation:

- on the left flank: the Ulrich von Hutten Infantry Division
- in the center: the Scharnhorst Infantry Division
- on the right flank near Niemegk : the "Theodor Körner" Infantry Division

Overall, there was a short-term gain in territory against the surprised Soviet troops.

The division surrendered to US Army troops near Tangermünde on the Elbe in May 1945.

== Composition ==
- Grenadier Regiments Theodor Körner 1st
- Grenadier Regiments Theodor Körner 2nd
- Grenadier Regiments Theodor Körner 3rd
- Division Fusilier Battalion Theodor Körner
- Theodor Körner Artillery Regiment
- Pioneer Battalion Theodor Körner

== Commander ==
- Lieutenant General Bruno Frankewitz, former commander of the disbanded 215th Infantry Division.

== Sources ==
- axis history
- Lexikon der Wehrmacht
