= Infantry Division Schlageter =

- Infanterie-Division Schlageter
- Active: 31 March 1945 – 3 May 1945
- Country: Nazi Germany
- Branch: German Army
- Type: Infantry
- Patron: Albert Leo Schlageter

Commanders
- Notable commanders: Wilhelm Heun

The Infantry Division Schlageter (German: Infanterie-Division Schlageter) was an infantry division of the German Wehrmacht during World War II. It was formed in late March 1945 as one of the last new divisions of the Wehrmacht before the end of the war.

The division was named after Albert Leo Schlageter (1894–1923).

== History ==
The Infantry Division Schlageter was formed on 31 March 1945 as a division of the 35th and final Aufstellungswelle in the Munster Training Area. It was formed as the first of three divisions staffed with Reich Labour Service (RAD) personnel. The division was initially also designated RAD-Division z.b.V. 1. It was then combined with parts of the 299th Infantry Division that had been relocated to the Dessau area from East Prussia. The 299th Infantry Division was subsequently formally disbanded on 4 April 1945. The divisional commander was Wilhelm Heun.

The division was deployed to the Ludwigslust area on 12 April and saw first combat near Waren, in support of units of the 3rd Panzer Army, on 29 April. The division was taken prisoner by U.S. Army forces on 3 May 1945.

== Noteworthy individuals ==
- Wilhelm Heun, divisional commander.

== See also ==
- List of military units named after people
