= Wilhelm Bleckwenn =

German general

- Born: 21 October 1906
- Died: 10 May 1989 (aged 82)
- Military career
- Allegiance: Nazi Germany
- Branch: Army
- Service years: 1935–45
- Rank: Generalmajor
- Commands: 708th Volksgrenadier Division; 1st Naval Infantry Division
- Conflicts: World War II: Operation Bagration
- Awards: Knight's Cross of the Iron Cross with Oak Leaves

Wilhelm Bleckwenn (21 October 1906 – 10 May 1989) was a German general in the Wehrmacht of Nazi Germany during World War II who commanded several divisions. He was a recipient of the Knight's Cross of the Iron Cross with Oak Leaves.

== Awards and decorations ==
- German Cross in Gold on 14 April 1942 as Major in Infanterie-Regiment 487
- Knight's Cross of the Iron Cross with Oak Leaves
  - Knight's Cross on 6 April 1944 as Oberst and commander of Grenadier-Regiment 487
  - 621st Oak Leaves on 18 October 1944 as Oberst and commander of Grenadier-Regiment 487

Military offices
Preceded by Konteradmiral Hans Hartmann	Commander of 1.Marine-Infanterie-Division; 28 February 1945 – 8 May 1945	Succeeded by None
