= 351st Infantry Division (Wehrmacht) =

- German: 351. Infanterie-Division
- Active: 10 March 1940 — 21 August 1940
- Country: Nazi Germany
- Branch: Heer
- Type: Infantry
- Size: Division
- Engagements: World War II

Commanders
- Notable commanders: Paul Göldner

The 351st Infantry Division (German: 351. Infanterie-Division) was an infantry division of the German army during World War II. It was active between March and August 1940.

== History ==
The 351st Infantry Division was formed as one of the Landesschützen divisions on 10 March 1940 as part of the ninth Aufstellungswelle. Its initial personnel was drawn from the Oberfeldkommandantur 587 in Częstochowa in the General Government (German-occupied Poland). The division initially consisted of the Infantry Regiments 641, 642, and 643, as well as the Battery 351 and Reconnaissance Squadron 351. The division's sole commander was Generalmajor Paul Göldner.

On 1 June 1940, the division left three guard companies in German-occupied Poland (Guard Companies 641, 642, 643) while the rest of the formation was deployed back to Germany, from where it was placed subordinate to the Military Administration in Belgium and Northern France on 2 June. On 29 June 1940, the three infantry regiments of the division gave their respective fifteenth companies, each responsible for their regiment's field recruitment, to the Field Recruit Infantry Regiment 214 (under the Kommandeur der Ersatztruppen 100), wherein the three companies formed a joint battalion.

On 21 August 1940, the 351st Infantry Division was dissolved. Its dissolution was carried out in its home district Wehrkreis XVII. The battalions I./642, II./642, III./642, I./643, III./643 as well as IV./641 and IV./643 (the latter two only formed as a stopgap measure in the aftermath of the division's dissolution) became home guard battalions to guard Allied prisoners of war interned in Germany. On 1 January 1941, these battalions subsequently became the Landesschützen Battalions 870, 880, 881, 876, 878, 874 and 879, respectively. The battalions II./641 and III./643 became the Guard Battalions 720 and 721 in November 1940. The battalion I./642 was redesignated II./584 and subsequently integrated into Infantry Regiment 584 of the 319th Infantry Division.

The 351st Infantry Division never saw combat.
