= 83rd Infantry Division (Wehrmacht) =

- 83. Infanterie-Division
- 83. Infanterie Division Vehicle Insignia
- Active: December 1939 – May 1945
- Country: Nazi Germany
- Branch: Army
- Type: Infantry
- Role: Nazi security warfare
- Size: Division
- Engagements: World War II: Invasion of Poland; Battle of France; Eastern Front (World War II); Courland Pocket

Commanders
- Notable commanders: Kurt von der Chevallerie

The 83rd Infantry Division (German: 83. Infanterie-Division) was a German reserve and security formation during World War II.

== Operational history ==
The division was formed December 1, 1939, at Bergen, and consisted of reservists from the north of Germany. The division took part in the Nazi German invasion of France in 1940 and spent 1941 on occupation duty. In early 1942 it was sent to the Eastern Front and was attached to the Third Panzer Army of Army Group Centre. Initially, the division was split up and used in various sectors, some elements being employed in Nazi security warfare in the rear.

The division was present at Velikiye Luki in late 1942. The town itself was garrisoned by the division's Infantry Regiment 277, along with the divisional artillery and pioneer battalion, under the command of a Lieutenant-Colonel von Saß. This force was encircled by units of Kuzma Galitsky's 3rd Shock Army in the Battle of Velikiye Luki and destroyed in fighting that lasted two months.

During 1943-1944, the 83rd Division was attached to Army Group Centre and Army Group North, having been transferred to the Sixteenth Army in October 1943. By late 1943 it had been reduced to four grenadier battalions. Towards the end of 1944 Army Group North had been pushed into the Courland Pocket. At the end of the year it was evacuated by sea, and sent to reform at Thorn. It was now assigned to the Second Army of Army Group Vistula, where it fought against the Soviet East Prussian Offensive. The staff and one regiment, Grenadier Regiment 257, were lost in Graudenz after being ordered to hold the town, which was encircled by the 2nd Belorussian Front on February 18, 1945. The German defenders capitulated on March 5.

The remaining troops were transferred by sea to Samland. They were pushed back towards Pillau, where elements of the 83rd Division formed the final rearguard defending the harbour mole on 25 April (the divisional commander Maximilian Wengler was killed at Neutief where the last German position was being held by Major-General Karl Henke). Other parts of the division surrendered to Soviet forces on the Hela peninsula.

== War crimes ==
The division took part in Nazi security warfare, such as Operation Greif at Vitebsk. In 1946 several captured officers of Infantry Regiment 277, including its former commander, Eduard Freiherr von Saß, were executed in Velikiye Luki for crimes committed by the Wehrmacht against the civilian population of the city.

== Commanding officers ==
- General der Infanterie Kurt von der Chevallerie (1 December 1939 – 10 December 1940)
- Generalleutnant Alexander von Zülow (10 December 1940 – 3 February 1942)
- Generalleutnant Adolf Sinzinger (12 February 1942 – 2 November 1942)
- Generalleutnant Theodor Scherer (2 November 1942 – 1 March 1944)
- Generalleutnant Wilhelm Heun (1 March 1944 – 29 June 1944)
- Generalleutnant Heinrich Götz (29 June 1944 – 22 August 1944)
- Generalleutnant Wilhelm Heun (22 August 1944 – 27 March 1945)
- Generalmajor der Reserve Maximilian Wengler (27 March 1945 – 26 April 1945)
- Oberst Hellmuth Raatz (26 April 1945 – 8 May 1945)

== Order of Battle ==
=== 1939 ===
- 251st Infantry Regiment
- 257th Infantry Regiment
- 277th Infantry Regiment
- 183rd Artillery Regiment
- Divisions Units 183

=== 1945 ===
- 251st Grenadier Regiment
- 257th Grenadier Regiment
- 277th Grenadier Regiment
- 183rd Artillery Regiment
- Divisions Units 183

== See also ==
- List of German divisions in World War II
