= 713th Infantry Division =

WWII German Army infantry division

- German: 713. Infanterie-Division
- Active: May 1941 – 15 January 1942
- Country: Nazi Germany
- Branch: Army
- Type: Infantry
- Size: Division

The 713th Infantry Division (German: 713. Infanterie-Division) was a German Army infantry division in World War II.

== History ==
The 713th Infantry Division was raised in May 1941 under the command of Generalmajor Franz Fehn. It was first used in September, where it was moved to the Balkans for standard occupational duties in southern Greece and Crete. The division was disestablished on 15 January 1942 and reformed into the first Crete Brigade.
