= 349th Infantry Division =

349th Infantry Division 349th Volksgrenadier-Division
- German: 349. Infanterie-Division; 349. Volksgrenadier-Division
- Active: November 1943 - August 1944; September 1944 - March 1945
- Country: Nazi Germany
- Branch: Army
- Type: Infantry
- Size: Division
- Engagements: World War II

The 349th Infantry Division was a German military unit which fought during World War II.

== History ==
The division was originally formed on 25 November 1943 in St. Omer near Calais, France, and fought mostly on the Eastern Front, being effectively destroyed near Zolochiv by the Soviet Army's Lvov-Sandomierz Offensive in July 1944, and disbanded in August 1944. Its commander was Infantry General Otto Lasch.

The division was reformed in September 1944 to the Volksgrenadier standard as 349th Volks-Grenadier-Division. This came about through the renaming of the 567th Volksgrenadier Division, which had been created a month earlier. The division was commanded by Major-General Karl Koetz.

During the East Prussian Offensive in January 1945, it was encircled in the Heiligenbeil pocket near Mehlsack and destroyed.
