= 228th Infantry Division =

- 228. Infanterie-Division
- Division Logo
- Active: August 1939 - August 1940
- Country: Nazi Germany
- Branch: Heer (Wehrmacht)
- Type: Infantry
- Size: Division

The 228th Infantry Division (German: 228. Infanterie-Division) was an infantry division of the German Heer during World War II. It was formed in Wehrkreis I (East Prussia) in August 1939 and was dissolved in August 1940.

== Operational history ==
The 228 Infantry Division was one of the divisions deployed in the immediate leadup to the Invasion of Poland and was part of the third Aufstellungswelle. It was first formed on 16 August 1939 in Elbing and designated a training division, but had this label removed on 26 August and thus designated a full division.

For the Invasion of Poland, 228th Infantry Division, under command of Hans Suttner, was one of the two constituent infantry divisions of XXI Army Corps (Nikolaus von Falkenhorst) under 3rd Army and Army Group North, the other one being 21st Infantry Division (Kuno-Hans von Both). Both the 21st and 228th Divisions were stationed in the southwest of East Prussia and were to move in a southwesterly direction towards Grudziądz and the Vistula in order to link up with the forces of 4th Army. 228th Infantry Division remained with XXI Army Corps only for the first few days of the campaign, for the action in the Danzig Corridor, including the Battle of Grudziądz against the Polish 4th and 16th Infantry Divisions. The German forces were victorious, but their Polish counterparts managed to withdraw to the southeast in an orderly fashion.

228th Infantry Division was then removed from XXI Army Corps when Falkenhorst's units were transferred via East Prussia to another active front sector.

Although 228th Infantry Division was initially intended to see combat in the Battle of France in 1940, this did not come to pass, as the German victory of the French came sooner than expected. The division was dissolved on 1 August 1940 in Munsterlager. Most of its staff members went to form the staff of the newly formed 16th Motorized Infantry Division.

== Noteworthy individuals ==
- Hans Suttner: Divisional commander of 228th Infantry Division from August 1939 to March 1940.
- Karl-Ulrich Neumann-Neurode: Divisional commander of 228th Infantry Division from March 1940 until August 1940.
- Henning von Tresckow: Staff officer in 228th Infantry Division's preparation for the Invasion of Poland in 1939. Later a member of the German resistance and involved in the 20 July 1944 plot.
