= 372nd Infantry Division =

- German: 372. Infanterie-Division
- Active: 20 March 1940 – 20 August 1940
- Country: Nazi Germany
- Branch: Army (Wehrmacht)
- Type: Infantry
- Size: Division

The 372nd Infantry Division (German: 372. Infanterie-Division) was an infantry division of the German army during World War II. It existed between March and August 1940.

== History ==
The 372nd Infantry Division was formed in Radom (German-occupied Poland) as part of the ninth deployment wave on 20 March 1940. Its initial staff was drawn from the personnel of the former Oberfeld-Kommandantur 581 in Berlin-Wilmersdorf. The division was structured into three Infantry Regiments (numbered 650, 651 and 652) as well as a field howitzer battery, a bicycle squadron and a signals company. Its personnel was mainly assembled from older conscripts that had been called to the colors following general mobilization in September 1939.

From November 1939 to May 1940, it was placed under the supervision of the Higher Command XXXVI, along with the 218th and 393rd Infantry Divisions.

Members of the division ambushed and killed Henryk Dobrzański, the first major partisan leader in German-occupied Poland, on 30 April.

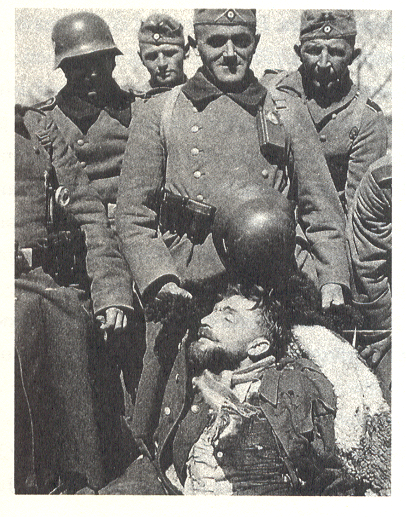
372nd Infantry Division, pictured with the dead body of Major Henryk Dobrzanski "Hubal" as a war trophy.

On 30 June 1940, the division was transported back to Germany to prepare its dissolution, under the supervision of the Ersatzheer, following the swift and unexpected German victory in the Battle of France. On 10 July 1940, three guard battalions (also numbered 650, 651 and 652) were formed from the 372nd Division's regiments. On 20 August 1940, the division was formally dissolved in Wehrkreis IV. The divisional staff had already been called upon on 1 August 1940 to form the Oberfeld-Kommandantur 372 in Kielce, whereas the personnel of the infantry regiments were distributed among autonomous battalions. These six battalions were designated the Landesschützen battalions 984 through 989 on 1 January 1941.
