= Bruno Gerloch =

Austrian general

- Born: 11 November 1890; Teschen, Teschen Silesia, Austrian Silesia, Austria-Hungary
- Died: 3 September 1954 (aged 63); Vienna, Allied-occupied Austria
- Military career
- Allegiance: (Austria-Hungary) Austria–Hungary; Republic of German-Austria; First Austrian Republic; Nazi Germany
- Branch: Austro-Hungarian Army; German-Austrian People's Militia; Bundesheer; Army (Wehrmacht)
- Service years: 1907–44
- Rank: Oberst
- Commands: Arko 2 Arko 117; 708th Infantry Division
- Conflicts: World War I World War II: Poland Campaign; Battle of France; Operation Barbarossa; Battle of Białystok–Minsk; Battle of Smolensk (1941); Battle of Moscow; Battles of Rzhev; Demyansk Pocket; Invasion of Normandy; Falaise pocket
- Awards: Knight's Cross of the Iron Cross

Bruno Emil Gerloch (11 November 1890 – 3 September 1954) was an Austrian officer, finally a Colonel in the Wehrmacht of Nazi Germany during World War II. He was a recipient of the Knight's Cross of the Iron Cross. Gerloch was captured in Trun (France) on 19 August 1944 by Canadian forces and was a POW until 1947.

On 11 December 1944, a planned promotion to Major General was announced (or suggested), however, documents from his military files at the German Federal Archives show that he was passed over for scheduled promotion on 30 January effective 1 February 1945 due to his MIA status. Therefore, a promotion to Major General can be ruled out. A "Führer decision", sent by telex from OKW to OKH/HPA on 23 November 1944, ordered the immediate suspension of the promotion of missing and captured soldiers ("decree to follow").

== Promotions ==
- 18 August 1911 Fähnrich (Officer Cadet)
- 1 November 1913 Leutnant (2nd Lieutenant)
- 1 May 1915 Oberleutnant (1st Lieutenant)
- 1 July 1920 Hauptmann (Captain)
- 1 June 1924 Stabshauptmann (Staff Captain or Captain 1st Class)
- 20 June 1928 Major

=== Wehrmacht ===
- 13 March 1938 Major
  - 15 August 1938 received Rank Seniority (RDA) from 1 June 1935 (60)
- 20 April 1939 Oberstleutnant (Lieutenant Colonel) with effect from 1 February 1939 and RDA from 1 February 1938 (44)
- 17 January 1941 Oberst (Colonel) with effect and Rank Seniority (RDA) from 1 February 1941 (5)

== Awards and decorations ==
- Austro-Hungarian Mobilization Cross 1912/13
- Austro-Hungarian Military Merit Medal (Signum Laudis) in Bronze on the ribbon of the Military Merit Cross (ribbon for wartime merit) with Swords
- Austro-Hungarian Military Merit Medal (Signum Laudis) in Silver on the ribbon of the Military Merit Cross (ribbon for wartime merit) with Swords (awarded twice during WWI)
- Military Merit Cross (Austria-Hungary), 3rd Class with the War Decoration and Swords (ÖM3KX)
- Austro-Hungarian Karl Troop Cross
- Military Service Badge (Austria-Hungary) for Officers, 2nd Class (for 25 years)
- Austrian War Commemorative Medal with Swords
- Military Merit Cross (Federal State of Austria), III. Class
- Wehrmacht Long Service Award, 4th to 1st Class (25-year Service Cross)
- Honour Cross of the World War 1914/1918 with Swords
- Iron Cross (1939), 2nd and 1st Class
  - 2nd Class on 16 September 1939
  - 1st Class on 10 October 1939
- Knight's Cross of the Iron Cross on 4 September 1940 as Lieutenant Colonel and Commander of Artillerie-Regiment 90 (motorized)
- General Assault Badge in Silver on 25 October 1940
- German Cross in Gold on 15 February 1942 as Colonel and Commander of Artillerie-Regiment 90 (motorized)
- Wound Badge (1939) in Black on 10 June 1942
  - On the Eastern Front, he suffered severe frostbite and was wounded in a hand grenade attack. According to military records, he was subsequently "impaired in his ability to walk."
- Winter Battle in the East 1941–42 Medal in August 1942
