= Wilhelm Heun =

WW II German general

- Born: 23 May 1895; Herborn
- Died: 21 September 1986 (aged 91); Göttingen
- Military career
- Allegiance: Nazi Germany
- Branch: Army (Wehrmacht)
- Rank: Generalleutnant
- Commands: 83. Infanterie-Division
- Conflicts: World War II
- Awards: Knight's Cross of the Iron Cross

Wilhelm Heun (23 May 1895 – 21 September 1986) was a German general during World War II. He was a recipient of the Knight's Cross of the Iron Cross of Nazi Germany.

== Awards and decorations ==
- Knight's Cross of the Iron Cross on 9 December 1944 as Generalmajor and commander of 83. Infanterie-Division

Military offices
Preceded by Generalleutnant Theodor Scherer	Commander of 83. Infanterie-Division; 1 March 1944 – 28 June 1944	Succeeded by Generalmajor Heinrich Götz
Preceded by Generalmajor Heinrich Götz	Commander of 83. Infanterie-Division; 22 August 1944 – 27 March 1945	Succeeded by Generalmajor of the Reserves Maximilian Wengler
