= Louis Tronnier =

- Born: 21 November 1897
- Died: 27 January 1952 (aged 54); Voikovo prison camp
- Military career
- Allegiance: Nazi Germany
- Branch: Army
- Rank: Generalmajor
- Commands: 123rd Infantry Division; Korps Abteilung F 62nd Infantry Division
- Conflicts: Jassy–Kishinev Offensive (August 1944)
- Awards: Knight's Cross of the Iron Cross

Louis Tronnier (21 November 1897 – 27 January 1952) was a general in the Wehrmacht of Nazi Germany during World War II. He was a recipient of the Knight's Cross of the Iron Cross. Tronnier surrendered to the Red Army forces during the second Soviet Jassy–Kishinev Offensive in August 1944. He died on 27 January 1952 at Voikovo officers' prison camp near Ivanovo.

== Awards and decorations ==
- Knight's Cross of the Iron Cross on 28 November 1942 as Oberst and commander of Grenadier-Regiment 70
