= 372nd =

372nd or 372d may refer to:

- 372d Bombardment Squadron, inactive United States Air Force unit
- 372d Fighter Group or 144th Fighter Wing, unit of the California Air National Guard, stationed at Fresno Air National Guard Base, California
- 372d Fighter Squadron or 352d Tactical Fighter Squadron, inactive United States Air Force fighter squadron
- 372nd Engineer Brigade (United States), combat engineer brigade of the United States Army based in Fort Snelling, Minnesota
- 372nd Infantry Regiment (United States), an African American regiment, nominally part of the 93rd Infantry Division (Colored), served with the French Army in World War I
- 372nd Military Police Company (United States), law enforcement unit within the U.S. Army Reserve
- 372nd Rifle Division, division of the Red Army during the Second World War

== See also ==
- 372 (number)
- 372, the year 372 (CCCLXXII) of the Julian calendar
- 372 BC
