= Baranivka, Myrhorod Raion, Poltava Oblast =

Village in Poltava Oblast, Ukraine

Baranivka Баранівка
- Village
- Location of Baranivka in Poltava Oblast Location of Baranivka in Ukraine
- Coordinates: 49°56′N 34°0′E
- Country: Ukraine
- Oblast: Poltava Oblast
- Raion: Myrhorod Raion
- Founded: 17th century

Population (2001)
  - Total: 616
- Postal code: 38021
- Area code: +380 5352
- Website: Ukrainian Parliament page

Baranivka (Ukrainian: Баранiвка, Russian: Барáновка) is a village in central Ukraine, specifically in Myrhorod Raion of Poltava Oblast. It belongs to Shyshaky settlement hromada, one of the hromadas of Ukraine.

== Geography ==
The settlement of Baranivka is situated on the left bank of the river Psel, neighbouring with the settlements of Kuibysheve (upstream in 2.5 km) and Velykyi Pereviz (2 km downstream). The auto routes Т-1720 and Т-1710 are close to the settlement.

== History ==
The name of the settlement of Baranivka was first mentioned in the 17th century. In July 1661 the estate on Psel River: the small town of Baranivka and the village Pereviz (now - Baranivka and Velykyi Pereviz), as well as the village Portanka were given to a nobleman Ivan Rudnytskyi. Those time the privilege to own "the hamlet on Psel" was given to Semen Holukhovskyi, a Cossack captain who was a chief of the Cossack Embassy to the Kingdom of Poland.

Until 18 July 2020, Baranivka belonged to Shyshaky Raion. The raion was abolished in July 2020 as part of the administrative reform of Ukraine, which reduced the number of raions of Poltava Oblast to four. The area of Shyshaky Raion was merged into Myrhorod Raion.

== Economy ==
- Milky goods farm
- "Nyva" Private Enterprise

== Social infrastructure ==
- Settlement Club
- Football club "Nyva-Baranivka"
- Settlement stadium
