= 715th Infantry Division =

- German: 715. Infanterie-Division
- Insignia of the German 715th Infantry Division
- Active: 8 May 1941 – 2 May 1945
- Country: Nazi Germany
- Branch: Army
- Type: Infantry
- Size: Division
- Engagements: Operation Shingle, Gothic Line, Eastern Front

The 715th Infantry Division (German: 715. Infanterie-Division) was a German infantry division which fought during World War II.

== Composition ==
As of 1942, the composition of the 715th Infantry Division was as follows:

- 715th Infantry Regiment
- 735th Infantry Regiment
- 671st Artillery Battalion
- 715th Reconnaissance Company
- 715th Engineer Battalion
- 715th Signal Company
- 715th Divisional Supply Troops

== Unit history ==
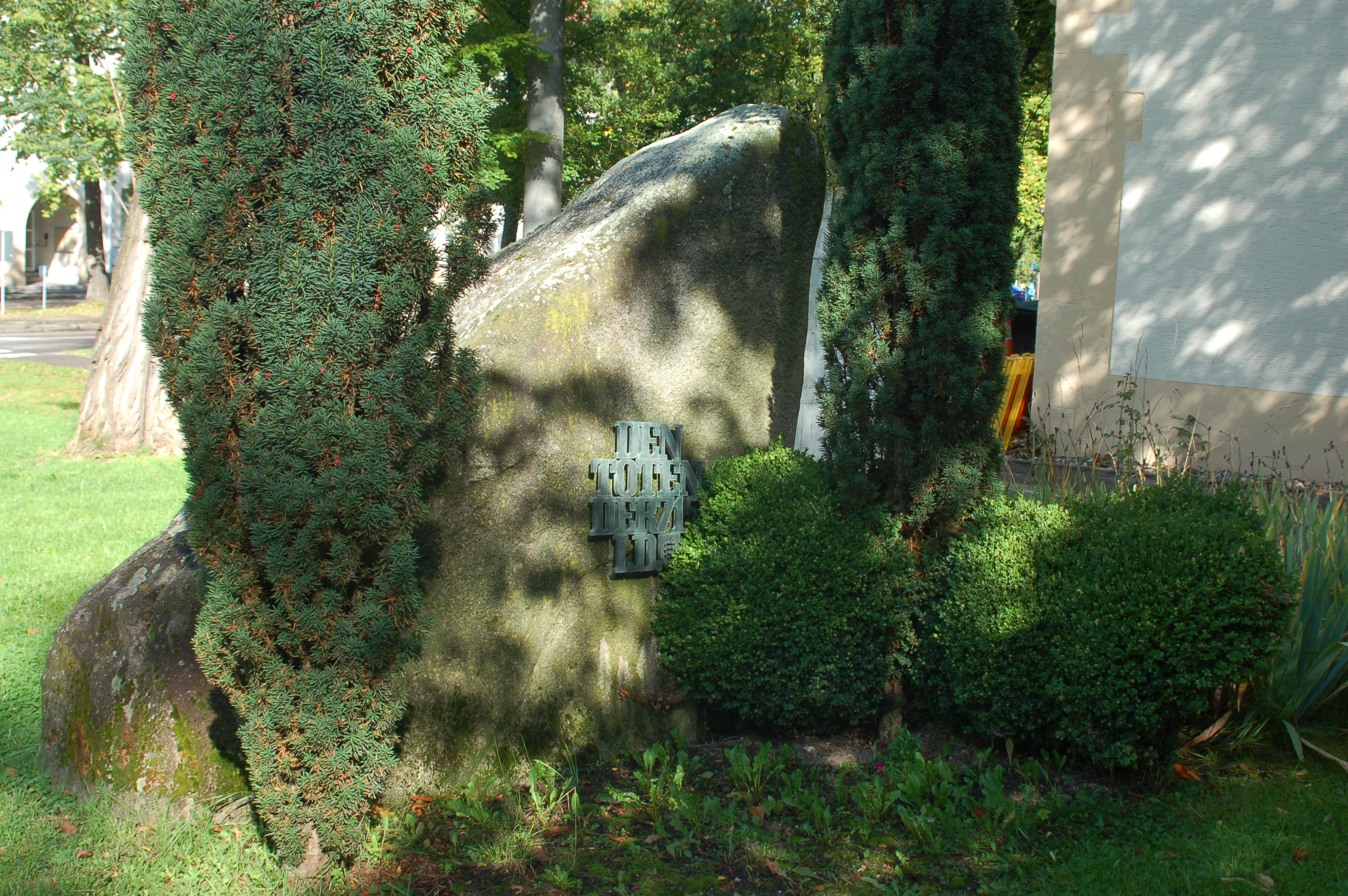
A memorial on Patch Barracks

The 715th (Static) Infantry Division was activated on 8 May 1941, and sent to southwestern France that fall. In late summer 1943, it took over the Cannes–Nice sector on the Mediterranean coast when elements of the Italian 4th Army returned home. In January 1944, the 715th was sent to Italy following the allied landings at Anzio and fought there until June, suffering heavy losses when the Allies broke out of the beachhead and took Rome. Sent to the rear, the 715th was rebuilt, largely from troops of the reinforced 1028th Grenadier Regiment and Shadow Division Wildflecken, which it absorbed. The division fought in the Gothic Line battles in September and was transferred to the Adriatic sector soon after. During this time the Italian Bersaglieri battalion "Mameli" fought under the command of the 715th Infantry Division. Rebuilt again in February 1945, it now included the 725th, 735th, and 774th Grenadier Regiments (two battalions each), the 671st Artillery Regiment (three battalions), the 715th Fusilier Battalion, the 715th Engineer Battalion, the 715th Tank Destroyer Battalion, the 715th Signal Company and the 715th Field Replacement Battalion. In early 1945, it was sent to the 1st Panzer Army on the Eastern Front, fought in Upper Silesia and surrendered to the Soviets in the Tábor–Písek area of Czechoslovakia on 2 May.

== Commanders ==
- Colonel/Major General Ernst Wening (2 May 1941)
- Major General/Lieutenant General Kurt Hoffmann (1 June 1942)
- Major General/Lieutenant General Hans-Georg Hildebrandt (5 February 1944)
- Colonel/ Major General Hans von Rohr (1 July 1944)
- Colonel Hans-Joachim Ehlert (18 September 1944)
- Major General Hans von Rohr (30 September 1944 - end)
