= Infantry Division Scharnhorst =

- Infanterie-Division Scharnhorst
- Active: 30 March 1945 – 2 May 1945
- Country: Nazi Germany
- Branch: German Army
- Type: Infantry
- Part of: 12th Army
- Patron: Gerhard von Scharnhorst

Commanders
- Notable commanders: Heinrich Götz

The Infantry Division Scharnhorst (German: Infanterie-Division Scharnhorst) was an infantry division of the German Wehrmacht during World War II. It was formed in late March 1945 as one of the last new divisions of the Wehrmacht before the end of the war.

The division was named after Prussian military reformer and army general Gerhard von Scharnhorst (1755–1813).

== History ==
The Infantry Division Scharnhorst was formed on 30 March 1945 in the Dessau area in Wehrkreis XI as part of the 35th (and last) draft wave. It was formed from high school students throughout Wehrkreis XI, as well as remnants of the 167th Infantry Division and the 340th Infantry Division. After Infantry Division Potsdam was beaten in the Harz mountains by 18 April, a weak leftover regiment joined Infantry Division Scharnhorst as a fusilier battalion.

The division's commander was Heinrich Götz. The division was first deployed in combat on 12 April near Barby against U.S. Army forces and was then deployed against the Red Army as part of the 12th Army near Beelitz on 26 April. The Infantry Division Scharnhorst was captured by American forces in Tangermünde on 2 May 1945.
