= 333rd Infantry Division =

- German: 333. Infanterie-Division
- Logo of the 333rd German Infanterie Division, 2 World War
- Active: 1941–November 1943
- Country: Nazi Germany
- Branch: Army
- Type: Infantry
- Size: Division
- Engagements: World War II

The 333rd Infantry Division was a division of the German Army during World War II. It was formed in November 1941, as a static division from cadres supplied by the 76th Infantry Division and the 293rd Infantry Division.

== Location ==
- 1940 Belgium
- 1941-1943 France
- 1943 Eastern Front
- October 1943 Destroyed near Zaporizhzhia in Ukraine and dissolved in November 1943

== Commanders ==
- Major General Rudolf Pitz (15 November 1940 - 10 December 1942)
- Major General Gerhard Grassman (10 December 1942 - 22 March 1943)
- Major General Rudolf von Tschudi (22 March - 1 July 1943)
- Colonel Wilhelm Crisolli (1–10 July 1943)
- Major General Erwin Menny (10 July - 17 October 1943)

== Formation ==
- 679th Infantry Regiment
- 680th Infantry Regiment
- 681st Infantry Regiment
- 33rd Artillery Regiment
- 333rd Motorcycle Company
- 333rd Tank Destroyer Battalion
- 333rd Engineer Battalion
- 333rd Signal Company
- 333rd Divisional Supply Troops
