= 311th Infantry Division =

311th Infantry Division (Bodensee)
- Active: November 1939 – August 1940
- Country: Germany
- Allegiance: Nazi Germany (Germany); German High Command (Germany)
- Branch: Army
- Type: Infantry
- Size: Division

The 311th Infantry Division was an army formation in Nazi Germany, established on 1 November 1939 in East Prussia during the Second World War from the Genesenen group Brand and the Lötzen Brigade, which were used by the 3rd Army.

After its deployment, the division remained at the Arys military training area in East Prussia. On 8 March 1940 the division was completely reclassified. At the beginning of the Battle of France, the second phase of the western campaign, the division was moved to the Grafenwoehr Training Area on 9 June 1940. The IV (field recruit) battalions of the infantry regiments formed in January 1940 were handed over here. The IV Infantry Regiment 247 became field replacement battalion 311. As a result of the rapid end to the western campaign, the 311th Infantry Division was disbanded on 7 August 1940.
