= 77th Infantry Division (Wehrmacht) =

- 77. Infanterie-Division
- 77th Infantry Division Insignia (Wehrmacht WW2)
- Active: January - August 1944
- Country: Nazi Germany
- Branch: Army
- Type: Infantry
- Size: Division
- Engagements: World War II: Battle of Normandy; Battle of Cherbourg

The 77th Infantry Division (77. Infanteriedivision in German) was a German military unit which served during World War II.

== Operational history ==
The infantry division was formed on 15 January 1944 in the town of Münsingen, and formed part of the twenty-fifth wave of infantry divisions raised in Germany. The division was built up around a cadre of officers and men from the 355th and 364th Infantry Divisions, which both had been badly mauled on the Eastern Front.

The new recruits joining the division were well trained, and benefited from the experience of the officers and men they were joining. The division was sent to Normandy in France as a component of the LXXXIV Corps of the 7th Army, which was tasked with defending occupied France from an Allied invasion west of the Seine. On March 5 the division was moved to Caen, where it aided the 352nd Infantry Division in coastal defense.

Initially commanded by Lieutenant General Walter Poppe, command was transferred to Lieutenant General Stegmann on May 1, with Colonel Bacherer, commander of the 7/8, assuming temporary command.

Initially opposing the U.S. 4th Infantry Division as it moved inland from Utah Beach, it was one of four divisions which were committed to the defence of Cotentin Peninsula to deny the Allies of the port at Cherbourg Naval Base: the understrength coastal defense divisions of 243rd, 709th Infantry Divisions, the 91st Air Landing Division and the first rate 77th Infantry Division. Stegmann was killed in mid-June with 300 of his men after getting caught up in Allied shelling; Colonel Bacherer re-assumed command. Initial assaults to push across the neck of the peninsula by the US 4th Division made little progress. By the June 17 the veteran U.S. 9th Infantry Division took over the responsibility of the assault. By the 18th it was clear that any units caught north of the allied advance would be lost. General Rommel attempted to get the 77th out of the closing noose but command issues were so layered and confused that the division could not get moving south until the allied line extended across the width and was solidifying. On June 19 the 77th became entrapped and was largely annihilated, with only two battalions escaping south. In early July the remainder of the division was caught up in fighting around Saint-Jores as the American 358th Infantry Regiment's 1st Battalion began to push heavily on them, leading to the German withdrawal by the end of the day. Elements of the 5th Parachute Division would temporarily restore German control before finally leaving the area on July 10. The remnant was destroyed during the Battle of Saint-Malo in August 1944.

== Commanders ==
- 01.02.1944 - 25.04.1944 : Generalleutnant Walter Poppe
- 25.04.1944 - 01.05.1944 : Oberst der Reserve Rudolf Bacherer
- 01.05.1944 - 18.06.1944 : Generalleutnant Rudolf Stegmann
- 18.06.1944 - 15.08.1944 : Oberst der Reserve Rudolf Bacherer

== Sources ==
Bibliography

- Willmott, H.P. (1984) "June, 1944" Blandford Press ISBN 0-7137-1446-8
