= List of Knight's Cross of the Iron Cross recipients (F) =

The Knight's Cross of the Iron Cross (German: Ritterkreuz des Eisernen Kreuzes) and its variants were the highest awards in the military and paramilitary forces of Nazi Germany during World War II. The Knight's Cross of the Iron Cross was awarded for a wide range of reasons and across all ranks, from a senior commander for skilled leadership of his troops in battle to a low-ranking soldier for a single act of extreme gallantry. A total of 7,321 awards were made between its first presentation on 30 September 1939 and its last bestowal on 17 June 1945. (Note: Großadmiral and President of Germany Karl Dönitz, Hitler's successor as Head of State (Staatsoberhaupt) and Supreme Commander of the Armed Forces, had ordered the cessation of all promotions and awards as of 11 May 1945 (Dönitz-decree). Consequently the last Knight's Cross awarded to Oberleutnant zur See of the Reserves Georg-Wolfgang Feller on 17 June 1945 must therefore be considered a de facto but not de jure hand-out.) This number is based on the analysis and acceptance of the order commission of the Association of Knight's Cross Recipients (AKCR). Presentations were made to members of the three military branches of the Wehrmacht—the Heer (Army), Kriegsmarine (Navy) and Luftwaffe (Air Force)—as well as the Waffen-SS, the Reichsarbeitsdienst (RAD—Reich Labour Service) and the Volkssturm (German national militia). There were also 43 recipients in the military forces of allies of the Third Reich.

These recipients are listed in the 1986 edition of Walther-Peer Fellgiebel's book, Die Träger des Ritterkreuzes des Eisernen Kreuzes 1939–1945 — The Bearers of the Knight's Cross of the Iron Cross 1939–1945. Fellgiebel was the former chairman and head of the order commission of the AKCR. In 1996, the second edition of this book was published with an addendum delisting 11 of these original recipients. Author Veit Scherzer has cast doubt on a further 193 of these listings. The majority of the disputed recipients had received the award in 1945, when the deteriorating situation of Germany in the final days of World War II in Europe left a number of nominations incomplete and pending in various stages of the approval process.

Listed here are the 280 Knight's Cross recipients whose last name starts with "F". Scherzer has challenged the validity of 12 of these listings. Georg-Wolfgang Feller, a 13th doubted recipient, is listed by the AKCR. However, the AKCR itself challenges his listing. The recipients are ordered alphabetically by last name. The rank listed is the recipient's rank at the time the Knight's Cross was awarded.

== Background ==
The Knight's Cross of the Iron Cross and its higher grades were based on four separate enactments. The first enactment, Reichsgesetzblatt I S. 1573 of 1 September 1939 instituted the Iron Cross (Eisernes Kreuz), the Knight's Cross of the Iron Cross and the Grand Cross of the Iron Cross (Großkreuz des Eisernen Kreuzes). Article 2 of the enactment mandated that the award of a higher class be preceded by the award of all preceding classes. As the war progressed, some of the recipients of the Knight's Cross distinguished themselves further and a higher grade, the Knight's Cross of the Iron Cross with Oak Leaves (Ritterkreuz des Eisernen Kreuzes mit Eichenlaub), was instituted. The Oak Leaves, as they were commonly referred to, were based on the enactment Reichsgesetzblatt I S. 849 of 3 June 1940. In 1941, two higher grades of the Knight's Cross were instituted. The enactment Reichsgesetzblatt I S. 613 of 28 September 1941 introduced the Knight's Cross of the Iron Cross with Oak Leaves and Swords (Ritterkreuz des Eisernen Kreuzes mit Eichenlaub und Schwertern) and the Knight's Cross of the Iron Cross with Oak Leaves, Swords and Diamonds (Ritterkreuz des Eisernen Kreuzes mit Eichenlaub, Schwertern und Brillanten). At the end of 1944 the final grade, the Knight's Cross of the Iron Cross with Golden Oak Leaves, Swords, and Diamonds (Ritterkreuz des Eisernen Kreuzes mit goldenem Eichenlaub, Schwertern und Brillanten), based on the enactment Reichsgesetzblatt 1945 I S. 11 of 29 December 1944, became the final variant of the Knight's Cross authorized.

== Recipients ==
Knight's Cross of the Iron Cross (F)
Service	Number of presentations	Posthumous presentations
Heer	179	13
Kriegsmarine	17	0
Luftwaffe	65	7
Waffen-SS	19	1

The Oberkommando der Wehrmacht (Supreme Command of the Armed Forces) kept separate Knight's Cross lists, one for each of the three military branches, Heer (Army), Kriegsmarine (Navy), Luftwaffe (Air Force) and Waffen-SS. Within each of these lists a unique sequential number was assigned to each recipient. The same numbering paradigm was applied to the higher grades of the Knight's Cross, one list per grade. Of the 280 awards made to servicemen whose last name starts with "F", 25 were later awarded the Knight's Cross of the Iron Cross with Oak Leaves and three the Knight's Cross of the Iron Cross with Oak Leaves and Swords; 21 presentations were made posthumously. Heer members received 179 of the medals; 17 went to the Kriegsmarine, 65 to the Luftwaffe, and 19 to the Waffen-SS.

This along with the + (plus) indicates that a higher grade of Knight's Cross was awarded as well.
This along with an * (asterisk) indicates that the Knight's Cross was awarded posthumously.
This along with the ! (exclamation mark) indicates that author Walther-Peer Fellgiebel has expressed doubt regarding the veracity or formal correctness of the listing.
This along with the ? (question mark) indicates that author Veit Scherzer has expressed doubt regarding the veracity or formal correctness of the listing.

Name	Service	Rank	Role and unit (Note: For an explanation of the various naming schemes used by the Luftwaffe, Heer, Kriegsmarine and Waffen-SS refer to nomenclature used by the Wehrmacht and Waffen-SS.)	Date of award	Notes	Image
Hans Faasch	Heer	Oberstleutnant	Commander of the II./Infanterie-Regiment 164	18 November 1941	—	—
Heinz-Otto Fabian+	Heer	Oberleutnant	Leader of the III./Grenadier-Regiment 534	15 March 1943	Awarded 522nd Oak Leaves 9 July 1944	—
Maximilian Fabich? (Note: Maximilian Fabich's nomination by the troop was submitted on 19 April 1945. There is no file card. The book "Verliehene Ritterkreuze" (Awarded Knight Crosses) contains an approval comment from Major Joachim Domaschk stating: "Knight's Cross yes". There are no further indications that the presentation was formally made. The order commission of the Association of Knight's Cross Recipients (AKCR) handled this case in 1973 and decided: "yes". The author Veit Scherzer was denied access to files, which could help clarify the case, of the AKCR on the grounds of the Bundesarchivgesetz (German Archive Law). According to the AKCR the award was presented in accordance with the Dönitz-decree. This is illegal according to the Deutsche Dienststelle (WASt) and lacks legal justification. The presentation date is an assumption of the AKCR. Fabich was a member of the AKCR.)	Heer	Oberstleutnant	Commander of Panzer-Füsilier-Regiment "Großdeutschland"	9 May 1945	—	—
Albert Fabritius	Heer	Wachtmeister	Company troop leader in the 8./Grenadier-Regiment 404	9 February 1945	—	—
Ernst Fach	Luftwaffe	Hauptmann	Staffelkapitän of the 9.(Eis)/Kampfgeschwader 3 "Lützow"	3 September 1943*	Killed in flying accident 15 May 1943	—
Siegfried Fackler	Heer	Hauptmann of the Reserves	Chief of the 14.(Panzerjäger)/Grenadier-Regiment 521 (Note: According to Scherzer as chief of the 14./Grenadier-Regiment 521.)	2 November 1943	—	—
Wilhelm Fahlbusch	Luftwaffe	Oberleutnant	Chief of the 8./Flak-Regiment 11 (motorized)	31 December 1941	—	—
Wolfgang Fahrenberg	Heer	Hauptmann of the Reserves	Leader of the I./Grenadier-Regiment 426	17 September 1944	—	—
Alfred Fahrenholz	Heer	Oberwachtmeister	Zugführer (platoon leader) in the 5./Artillerie-Regiment 240	5 May 1943	—	—
Wilhelm Fahrmbacher	Heer	Generalleutnant	Commander of the 5. Infanterie-Division	24 June 1940	—	—
Wolfgang Falck	Luftwaffe	Major	Geschwaderkommodore of Nachtjagdgeschwader 1	1 October 1940	—	—
Ernst Falk	Heer	Obergefreiter	Messenger in the 10./Grenadier-Regiment 61	30 September 1944	—	—
Günter von Falkenhayn	Heer	Leutnant	Leader of the 7./Jäger-Regiment 75	25 November 1942	—	—
Nikolaus von Falkenhorst	Heer	General der Infanterie	Commander-in-chief of Gruppe XXI (Norway) (Note: According to Scherzer as commander-in-chief of Gruppe XXI.)	30 April 1940	—	
Wilhelm Falley	Heer	Oberstleutnant	Commander of Infanterie-Regiment 4	26 November 1941	—	—
Günther Famula	Heer	Leutnant of the Reserves	Zugführer (platoon leader) in the V./Grenadier-Regiment "Großdeutschland" (Panzer-Kampfgruppe Graf Strachwitz) (Note: According to Scherzer as Zugführer (platoon leader) in the 5.(Panzer-Kompanie)/V./Grenadier-Regiment "Großdeutschland".)	4 May 1944*	Died of wounds 22 April 1944	—
Georg Fanderl	Luftwaffe	Feldwebel	Pilot in the 1./Kampfgeschwader 51 (Note: According to Scherzer as pilot in the I./Kampfgeschwader 51.)	24 January 1942	—	—
Friedrich Fangohr	Heer	Generalleutnant	Chief of the Generalstab Panzer-AOK 4	9 June 1944	—	—
Walter Fasel	Heer	Feldwebel	Zugführer (platoon leader) in the 14.(Panzerjäger)/Füsilier-Regiment 26 (Note: According to Scherzer as Zugführer (platoon leader) in the 14./Füsilier-Regiment 26.)	31 August 1943	—	—
Horst-Günther von Fassong	Luftwaffe	Hauptmann	Gruppenkommandeur of the III./Jagdgeschwader 11	27 July 1944	—	—
Fridolin Fath	Luftwaffe	Major	Deputy Gruppenkommandeur of the IV./Kampfgeschwader z.b.V. 1	23 December 1942	—	—
Karl Faulhaber	Heer	Oberst	Commander of Grenadier-Regiment 282	19 December 1943	—	—
Markus Faulhaber	Waffen-SS	SS-Obersturmführer	Chief of the 3./SS-Infanterie-Regiment "Germania" (Note: According to Scherzer as chief of the 3./SS-Infanterie-Regiment (motorized) "Germania".)	25 December 1942	—	—
Dr. Klaus Faulmüller	Heer	Oberleutnant of the Reserves (Note: According to Scherzer as Leutnant of the Reserves.)	Leader of the 7./Gebirgsjäger-Regiment 13	25 June 1943	—	—
Fritz Faust	Heer	Obergefreiter	In the 3./Füssilier-Regiment 26 (Note: According to Scherzer as machine gunner in the 3./Infanterie-Regiment 426.)	20 August 1942	—	—
Fritz Fechner	Heer	Major	Commander of the III./Panzer-Regiment 23	6 October 1943	—	—
Konrad Fechner	Luftwaffe	Feldwebel	Pilot in the 6./Sturzkampfgeschwader 77 (Note: According to Scherzer as pilot in the I./Schlachtgeschwader 77.)	4 May 1944	—	—
Karl-August von der Fecht	Luftwaffe	Hauptmann	Staffelkapitän of the 2./Kampfgeschwader 3 "Lützow"	30 December 1942	—	—
Hermann Fegelein? (Note: Hermann Fegelein was sentenced to death by Hitler and executed by SS General Johann Rattenhuber's Reichssicherheitsdienst on 28 April 1945 after a court-martial led by SS-Brigadeführer and Generalmajor of the Waffen-SS Wilhelm Mohnke. The sentence was carried out the same day. The death sentence resulted in the loss of all orders and honorary signs.)	Waffen-SS	SS-Standartenführer	Commander of the SS-Kavallerie-Brigade	2 March 1942	Awarded 157th Oak Leaves 21 December 1942; 83rd Swords 30 July 1944	
Waldemar Fegelein	Waffen-SS	SS-Sturmbannführer	Leader of SS-Reiter-Regiment 2	16 December 1943	—	—
Gustav Fehn	Heer	Oberst	Commander of Schützen-Regiment 33	5 August 1940	—	
Erich Fehr	Heer	Hauptmann	Leader of the I./Grenadier-Regiment 504	26 January 1944	—	—
Siegfried Fehre	Heer	Leutnant	Vorgeschobener Beobachter (forward observer) in the 10./Artillerie-Regiment 126	13 December 1942	—	—
Paul Feiertag	Heer	Unteroffizier	Group leader in the 3./Divisions-Füsilier-Bataillon 96	30 September 1944	—	—
Georg Feig	Heer	Oberleutnant of the Reserves	Chief of the 3./Schützen-Regiment 113	4 October 1941	—	—
Hans Felber	Heer	General der Infanterie	Commanding general of the XIII. Armeekorps	17 September 1941	—	
Paul Felder	Luftwaffe	Oberleutnant	Pilot in the 1.(F)/Aufklärungs-Gruppe 121 (Note: According to Scherzer as pilot in the Aufklärungsstaffel 1.(F)/122.)	29 February 1944	—	—
Wendelin Felder	Heer	Oberleutnant (Note: According to Scherzer as Oberleutnant of the Reserves and missing in action since 24 October 1943.)	Battery chief in the IV./Artillerie-Regiment 85	23 February 1944*	Missing in action 23 October 1943	—
Heinrich Feldkamp	Heer	Oberwachtmeister	Zugführer (platoon leader) in the 2./Heeres-Sturmgeschütz-Brigade 341 (Note: According to Scherzer as Zugführer (platoon leader) in the 2./Heeres-Sturmgeschütz-Brigade 241.)	14 April 1945	—	—
Alfred Feldmann	Heer	Hauptmann	Leader of the I./Infanterie-Regiment 454	20 August 1942	—	—
Klaus Feldt+	Kriegsmarine	Oberleutnant zur See	Commander of Schnellboot S-30 in the 2. Schnellbootflottille	25 April 1941	Awarded 362nd Oak Leaves 1 January 1944	—
Kurt Feldt	Heer	Generalmajor	Commander of the 1. Kavallerie-Division	23 August 1941	—	—
Rudolf Felgenhauer	Heer	Fahnenjunker-Feldwebel	Zugführer (platoon leader) in the 3./Grenadier-Regiment Gruppe 385	9 June 1944	—	—
Waldemar Felgenhauer	Luftwaffe	Oberleutnant (Note: According to Scherzer as Oberleutnant of the Reserves and pilot in the Aufklärungsstaffel 2.(F)/123.)	Pilot in the 2.(F)/Aufklärungs-Gruppe 123	14 January 1942	—	—
Fritz Feller	Heer	Leutnant of the Reserves	Leader of the 1./Panzergrenadier-Regiment 5	23 February 1944	—	—
Georg-Wolfgang Feller! (Note: Großadmiral Karl Dönitz had ordered a cease of all promotions and awards as of 11 May 1945. Nevertheless a number of Knight's Crosses were awarded after this date and must therefore be considered "illegal" hand-outs. The Oberbefehlshaber der Kriegsmarine General-Admiral Walter Warzecha, successor of General-Admiral Hans-Georg von Friedeburg, without authorization presented Georg-Wolfgang Feller the Knight's Cross on 17 June 1945.)	Kriegsmarine	Oberleutnant zur See of the Reserves	Group leader in the 36. Minensuchflottille	17 June 1945	—	—
Leopold Fellerer	Luftwaffe	Hauptmann	Gruppenkommandeur of the II./Nachtjagdgeschwader 5	8 April 1944	—	—
Walther-Peer Fellgiebel	Heer	Oberleutnant	Chief of the 2./leichtes Heeres Artillerie-Abteilung 935 (motorized)	7 September 1943	—	—
[Dr.] Erich Fellmann (Note: The brackets around the doctor title [Dr.] denotes that the academic title was attained after the Knight's Cross of the Iron Cross was awarded.)	Heer	Hauptmann	Commander of the II./Grenadier-Regiment 409	6 April 1943	—	—
Konrad Fels	Heer	Obergefreiter	Group leader in the 7./Grenadier-Regiment 23	23 October 1944	—	—
Peter Felten	Heer	Obergefreiter	Messenger in the 1./Grenadier-Regiment 377	12 August 1944	—	—
Maximilian Felzmann+	Heer	Generalmajor	Commander of the 251. Infanterie-Division	28 November 1943	Awarded 643rd Oak Leaves 3 November 1944	—
Henri Joseph Fenet	Waffen-SS	Waffen-Hauptsturmführer	Commander of the assault battalion in the 33. SS-Freiwilligen-Grenadier-Division "Charlemagne" (Note: According to Scherzer as commander of the assault battalion/33. Waffen-Grenadier-Division der SS "Charlemagne" (französische Nr. 1).)	29 April 1945	—	—
Dr. rer.pol. Paul Fenn	Kriegsmarine	Kapitän zur See (M.A.)	Commander of Marine-Flak-Regiment 9	25 March 1945	—	—
Günther Fenski	Heer	Major	Commander of the I./Panzer-Regiment 8	31 December 1941*	Died of wounds 23 November 1941	—
Horst-Arno Fenski	Kriegsmarine	Oberleutnant zur See	Commander of U-410	26 November 1943	—	—
[Dr.] Hans Fernau? (Note: The presentation of the Knight's Cross of the Iron Cross to Hans-Georg Fernau was made on 10 June 1945 and backdated by the Oberbefehlshaber Süd (German Army Command in the South), General der Kavillerie Siegfried Westphal, to the 1 May 1945. The German Federal Archives holds a copy of the presentation documentation. This is unlawful! The presentation date was later changed by the Association of Knight's Cross Recipients (AKCR) to 4 May 1945. Fernau was a member of the AKCR.)	Heer	Hauptmann of the Reserves	Commander of the I./Grenadier-Regiment (motorized) "Feldherrnhalle"	4 May 1945	—	—
Fritz Feßmann+	Heer	Leutnant of the Reserves	Zugführer (platoon leader) in the 1./Panzer-Aufklärungs-Abteilung 7	27 October 1941	Awarded 170th Oak Leaves 4 January 1943; 103rd Swords 23 October 1944	—
Edgar Feuchtinger? (Note: Generalmajor Edgar Feuchtinger was arrested on 5 January 1945 for his absence from his command in June and December 1944. He was demoted to Kanonier and sentenced to death in January 1945. Kanonier Feuchtinger was sent to the front with the 20. Panzergrenadier-Division for probation on 2 March 1945. He deserted, hid in Celle, and was captured and taken prisoner of war in Hamburg by British forces in May 1945. The death sentence resulted in the permanent loss of all orders and honorary signs.)	Heer	Generalmajor	Commander of the 21. Panzer-Division	6 August 1944	—	
Alois Feuerer	Heer	Oberleutnant (Note: According to Scherzer as Oberleutnant of the Reserves.)	Leader of the 2./Infanterie-Regiment 351	27 January 1942	—	—
Gerhard Feuker	Heer	Major	Commander of the I./Grenadier-Regiment 53 (motorized)	23 December 1942*	Killed in action 30 November 1942	—
Valentin Feurstein	Heer	General der Gebirgstruppe	Commanding general of the LI. Gebirgsarmeekorps	12 August 1944	—	
Willi Fey? (Note: A lawful presentation via the chain of command to the chief of the Heerespersonalamt (HPA—Army Staff Office) Wilhelm Burgdorf in Berlin submitted nomination is possible. Also possible is a direct presentation by Adolf Hitler. However no evidence of the award can be found in the German Federal Archives. The author Veit Scherzer was denied access to files, which could help clarify the case, of the Association of Knight's Cross Recipients (AKCR) on the grounds of the Bundesarchivgesetz (German Archive Law). Walther-Peer Fellgiebel wrote in a letter dated 31 August 1976: "...He (Willhelm Fey) after joining the Bundeswehr has request a court of honor against himself. Chairman was our companion recipient of the Oak Leaves former Oberst XXXX (name was made anonymous). This court of honor has accepted him without evidence". The order commission of the AKCR accepted this. Fellgiebel wrote: "...we don't want to claim that we are smarter than the Bundeswehr." Willhelm Fey was a member of the AKCR.)	Waffen-SS	SS-Oberscharführer	Panzer commander in the schwere SS-Panzer-Abteilung 502	29 April 1945	—	—
Gerhard Feyerabend	Heer	Generalleutnant	Commander of the 11. Infanterie-Division	5 April 1945	—	—
Ernst Fick	Luftwaffe	Hauptmann	Staffelkapitän of the 6./Sturzkampfgeschwader 2 "Immelmann"	19 September 1942*	Killed in action 27 July 1942	—
Jacob Fick	Waffen-SS	SS-Sturmbannführer	Commander of the I./SS-Kradschützen-Regiment "Langemarck" (Note: According to Scherzer as commander of the I.(Kradschützen)/SS-Schützen-Regiment "Langemarck".)	23 April 1943	—	—
Helmut Fickel	Luftwaffe	Leutnant	Staffelführer of the Stabsstaffel of the III./Schlachtgeschwader 2 "Immelmann" (Note: According to Scherzer as adjutant of the III./Schlachtgeschwader 2 "Immelmann".)	9 June 1944	—	—
Heinz Fiebig? (Note: Heinz Fiebig's nomination by the Heerespersonalamt (HPA—Army Staff Office) was ready for signature at the end of the war. According to the Association of Knight's Cross Recipients (AKCR) the award was presented in accordance with the Dönitz-decree. This is illegal according to the Deutsche Dienststelle (WASt) and lacks legal justification. The presentation date is an assumption of the AKCR.)	Heer	Generalmajor	Commander of the 84. Infanterie-Division	8 May 1945	—	
Martin Fiebig+	Luftwaffe	Oberst	Geschwaderkommodore of Kampfgeschwader 4 "General Wever"	8 May 1940	Awarded 168th Oak Leaves 23 December 1942	—
Wilhelm Fiederer	Heer	Leutnant of the Reserves	Chief of the 5./Infanterie-Regiment 164	14 September 1942	—	—
Alex Fiedler	Heer	Leutnant of the Reserves	Zugführer (platoon leader) in the 3./Grenadier-Regiment 200 (motorized)	16 October 1944	—	—
Hans Fiedler	Heer	Rittmeister	Leader of Aufklärungs-Abteilung 118	26 December 1944	—	—
Hans Fiedler	Heer	Oberfeldwebel	Company troop leader in the 9./Grenadier-Regiment 309	18 February 1945	—	—
Johann Fiedler	Waffen-SS	SS-Unterscharführer	Zugführer (platoon leader) in the 5./SS-Panzergrenadier-Regiment 6 "Theodor Eicke"	16 June 1944	—	—
Walter Fiedler	Heer	Gefreiter	Telephone operator in the Stabsbatterie (staff battery) of the II./Artillerie-Regiment 219	28 December 1944	—	—
Ernst Filius	Luftwaffe	Oberfeldwebel	Radio operator in the I./Schlachtgeschwader 2 "Immelmann"	4 May 1944	—	—
Friedrich Filzinger	Heer	Major	Commander of the III./Artillerie-Regiment 8	5 June 1940	—	—
Kurt Fimmen	Kriegsmarine	Oberleutnant zur See	Commander of Schnellboot S-26 in the 1. Schnellbootflottille	14 August 1940	—	—
Herbert Findeisen	Luftwaffe	Hauptmann	Pilot and observer in the 2.(H)/Nahaufklärungs-Gruppe 4 (Note: According to Scherzer as pilot and observer in the 2./Nahaufklärungsgruppe 4.)	29 February 1944	—	—
Arthur Finger	Heer	Oberst	Commander of Artillerie-Regiment 306	16 November 1943	—	—
Günter Fink	Luftwaffe	Oberleutnant	Pilot in the 8./Jagdgeschwader 54	14 March 1943	—	—
Dipl.-Ing. Johannes Fink	Luftwaffe	Oberst	Geschwaderkommodore of Kampfgeschwader 2	20 June 1940	—	
Josef Fink	Heer	Gefreiter	Group leader in Grenadier-Bataillon 106 "Feldherrnhalle" (Note: According to Scherzer as group leader in Grenadier-Bataillon 2106.)	9 December 1944	—	—
Karl-Heinrich Fink	Heer	Leutnant	Adjutant of the II./Panzergrenadier-Regiment 113 (Note: According to Scherzer as adjutant of the II./Panzergrenadier-Regiment 40.)	20 February 1943	—	—
Wilhelm Finkbeiner	Heer	Oberleutnant of the Reserves	Leader of the 14./Grenadier-Regiment 147	20 July 1944	—	—
Andreas Finke	Luftwaffe	Leutnant	Pilot in the 6.(F)/Aufklärungs-Gruppe 122 (Note: According to Scherzer as pilot in the Aufklärungsstaffel 6.(F)/122.)	6 December 1944*	Killed on active service 2 September 1944	—
Heinz Finke	Heer	Hauptmann	Commander of the I./Grenadier-Regiment 51 (motorized)	4 May 1944	—	—
Adolf Fischbach	Luftwaffe	Oberleutnant	Staffelkapitän of the 4./Kampfgeschwader 27 "Boelcke"	29 February 1944	—	—
Adolf Fischer	Heer	Oberst	Commander of Grenadier-Regiment 459	4 May 1944	—	—
Alfred Fischer? (Note: Alfred Fischer's nomination, according to a file card, was received by the Heerespersonalamt (HPA—Army Staff Office) on 11 January 1945. The nomination, according to the book "Verliehene Ritterkreuze" (Awarded Knight Crosses) and the note on the file card, had been rejected without specifying a date. A HPA nomination was not created. Fischer received the Honour Roll Clasp of the Army on 5 March 1945 which may have been a result of the rejected Knight's Cross nomination. The nomination by the troop is missing, which may be an indication that it had been forwarded to the Referat Vg (responsible for the Honour Roll Clasp listings). The presentation date is an assumption of the Association of Knight's Cross Recipients (AKCR). Krätschmer states the 9 May 1945.)	Waffen-SS	SS-Sturmbannführer	Commander of the II./SS-Panzer-Artillerie-Regiment 11 "Nordland"	11 May 1945	—	—
Erich Fischer	Heer	Leutnant	Leader of the 1./Sturm-Regiment 14	31 March 1943	—	—
Erwin Fischer+	Luftwaffe	Oberleutnant	Pilot in the 1.(F)/Aufklärungs-Gruppe 121 (Note: According to Scherzer on 25 April 1941 as pilot in the Aufklärungsstaffel 1.(F)/121.)	21 April 1941	Awarded 191st Oak Leaves 8 February 1943	—
Franz Fischer	Heer	Feldwebel	Zugführer (platoon leader) in the 2./Führer-Panzer-Regiment 1 of the Führer-Begleit-Division (Note: According to Scherzer as Zugführer (platoon leader) in the 2./Führer-Panzer-Regiment 1.)	30 April 1945	—	—
Friedrich Fischer	Heer	Leutnant	Leader of the 6./Grenadier-Regiment 278	7 April 1944	—	—
Gerhard Fischer	Heer	Oberleutnant	Chief of the 8./Panzer-Regiment 23	28 December 1943	—	—
Gerhard Fischer	Waffen-SS	SS-Unterscharführer	Deputy Zugführer (platoon leader) in the 3./SS-Panzer-Jagd-Abteilung 5 "Wiking" (Note: According to Scherzer as deputy Zugführer (platoon leader) in the 3./SS-Panzer-Jagd-Abteilung 5.)	4 May 1944	—	—
Gotthard Fischer	Heer	Oberst	Leader of the 126. Infanterie-Division	7 February 1944	—	—
Hans Fischer	Heer	Obergefreiter	Group leader in the 6./Gebirgsjäger-Regiment 143	9 December 1944	—	—
Hans-Ulrich Fischer	Heer	Leutnant of the Reserves	Leader of the 11./Infanterie-Regiment 431	23 October 1941	—	—
Heinz Fischer	Luftwaffe	Hauptmann	Staffelkapitän of the 9./Sturzkampfgeschwader 1	25 November 1942*	Killed in action 26 October 1942	—
Hermann Fischer	Heer	Oberst	Commander of Infanterie-Regiment 340	9 May 1940	—	—
Hermann-Georg Fischer	Heer	Hauptmann	Commander of the I./Grenadier-Regiment 1082	10 February 1945	—	—
Josef Fischer	Heer	Major	Commander of the II./Grenadier-Regiment 507	6 August 1943	—	—
Karl-Heinz Fischer	Kriegsmarine	Steuermannsmaat	Coxswain on Vorpostenboot VP-711 in the 7. Vorpostenbootflottille	3 May 1943	—	—
Michael Fischer	Luftwaffe	Oberleutnant (Note: According to Scherzer on 7 April 1943 as Oberleutnant of the Reserves and battery chief in the 1./Flak-Regiment (motorized) 14.)	Battery chief in the I./Flak-Regiment 14 (motorized)	8 April 1943	—	—
Otto Fischer	Heer	Oberstleutnant	Commander of Grenadier-Regiment 156 (motorized)	27 August 1943	—	—
Robert Fischer	Heer	Feldwebel	Zugführer (platoon leader) in the Jagdpanzer-Kompanie 1257	29 April 1945 (Note: According to Scherzer on 30 April 1945.)	—	—
Siegfried Fischer	Luftwaffe	Oberfeldwebel	Pilot in the 8./Schlachtgeschwader 1	28 February 1945	—	—
Dr. phil. Walther Fischer	Kriegsmarine	Korvettenkapitän of the Reserves	Chief of the 13. Vorpostenflottille	8 May 1943	—	—
Wilhelm Fischer	Heer	Leutnant	Leader of the 3./Grenadier-Regiment 24	28 March 1945	—	—
Wolfgang Fischer+	Heer	Oberst	Commander of the 10. Schützen-Brigade	3 June 1940	Awarded 152nd Oak Leaves 9 December 1942	
Walther Fischer von Weikersthal	Heer	Generalleutnant	Commander of the 35. Infanterie-Division	6 August 1941	—	
Josef-August Fitz+	Heer	Hauptmann	Commander of the I./Panzergrenadier-Regiment 74	11 December 1942	Awarded 511th Oak Leaves 24 June 1944	—
Josef Fitzek	Heer	Feldwebel	Zugführer (platoon leader) in the 5./Grenadier-Regiment 482	16 June 1943	—	—
Karl Fitzner	Luftwaffe	Leutnant	Staffelführer of the 1./Sturzkampfgeschwader 77	27 November 1942	—	—
Bernhard Flachs+	Heer	Hauptmann	Ia (German abbreviation for Eins-A or Erster Generalstabsoffizier—One-A; first officer of the general staff responsible for operations) in the Stab of Artillerie-Kommandant (Arko) 149	30 October 1942	Awarded 381st Oak Leaves 31 January 1944	—
Werner Flack	Heer	Oberleutnant of the Reserves	Chief of the 12./Jäger-Regiment 49	22 August 1943	—	—
Eugen Flad	Heer	Gefreiter	Machine gunner in the 2.(Radfahr)/Divisions-Füsilier-Bataillon 252 (Note: According to Scherzer as machine gunner in the 2./Divisions-Füsilier-Bataillon 252.)	20 July 1944	—	—
Kurt Flad	Heer	Oberleutnant of the Reserves	Chief of the 6./Artillerie-Regiment 219	20 December 1943	—	—
Rudolf Flebbe	Heer	Oberleutnant	Chief of the 9./Artillerie-Regiment 218	29 November 1944	—	—
Willi Flechner	Luftwaffe	Hauptmann	Staffelkapitän of the 5./Kampfgeschwader 30	13 August 1942	—	—
Gerhard Flechsig	Heer	Feldwebel	Zugführer (platoon leader) in the Stabskompanie/Panzergrenadier-Regiment 12	18 November 1944	—	—
Hermann Fleck	Heer	Feldwebel	Zugführer (platoon leader) in the 2./Grenadier-Regiment 270	9 January 1945	—	—
Hubert Fleckenstein	Heer	Feldwebel	Zugführer (platoon leader) in the Stabskompanie/Grenadier-Regiment 106	31 January 1944	—	—
Erwin Fleig	Luftwaffe	Leutnant	Pilot in the 2./Jagdgeschwader 51 (Note: According to Scherzer as I./Jagdgeschwader 51.)	12 August 1941	—	—
Karl Fleige	Kriegsmarine	Oberleutnant zur See	Commander of U-18	18 July 1944	—	—
Hermann Fleischer	Heer	Oberfeldwebel	Zugführer (platoon leader) in the 2./Infanterie-Regiment 517	29 October 1942	—	—
Rudolf Fleischer? (Note: Rudol Fleischer's nomination was received by the Heerespersonalamt (HPA—Army Staff Office) on 28 March 1945. Major Joachim Domaschk approved the nomination but no Heerespersonalamt-Verleihungsvorschlag (HPA-VV— Army Staff Office Nomination Recommendation) was created and no further information was noted. The order commission of the Association of Knight's Cross Recipients (AKCR) processed this case in 1983/1984 and decided "Knight's Cross yes, 13 April 1945". According to the AKCR the award was presented in accordance with the Dönitz-decree. This is illegal according to the Deutsche Dienststelle (WASt) and lacks legal justification. Walther-Peer Fellgiebel later changed the presentation date to 9 May 1945. Fleischer was a member of the AKCR.)	Heer	Major	Commander of Heeres-Flak-Abteilung 314	9 May 1945	—	—
Josef Fleischmann	Heer	Major	Commander of the I./Gebirgsjäger-Regiment 99	31 March 1942*	Died of wounds 3 March 1942	—
Ludwig Fleischmann	Heer	Oberfeldwebel	Zugführer (platoon leader) in the 6./Jäger-Regiment 207	17 December 1943	—	—
Hermann Flex	Heer	Unteroffizier	Group leader in the 7./Grenadier-Regiment 337	12 March 1943	—	— —
Fritz Fliegel	Luftwaffe	Hauptmann	Gruppenkommandeur of the I./Kampfgeschwader 40	25 March 1941	—	
Peter Fließbach	Heer	Oberleutnant	Leader of the 4./Artillerie-Regiment 23	20 December 1941	—	— —
Dr.-Ing. Rudolf Flinzer+	Heer	Oberstleutnant of the Reserves	Commander of Grenadier-Regiment 317	6 April 1943	Awarded 575th Oak Leaves 5 September 1944	—
Paul Flocke? (Note: Paul Flocke's nomination was received by the Heerespersonalamt (HPA—Army Staff Office) on 28 March 1945. The next day it was forwarded to the Außenstelle (HPA/A—Branch of the Army Staff Office) for decision by the Chief of the Oberkommando der Wehrmacht. It remained undecided by the end of the war. Further missing are the opinions of the Heeresgruppe G and Reichsführer SS.)	Heer	Leutnant	Leader of the 5./Grenadier-Regiment 915	30 April 1945*	Killed in action 1 March 1945	— —
Josef Flögel	Luftwaffe	Oberfeldwebel	Pilot in the 3./Nachtschlacht-Gruppe 5	19 February 1945	—	— —
Hans-Joachim Floer	Heer	Oberleutnant of the Reserves	Chief of the 1.(gepanzert)/Panzergrenadier-Regiment 25	5 March 1945	—	— —
Hermann Flörke+	Heer	Generalmajor	Commander of the 14. Infanterie-Division	15 December 1943	Awarded 565th Oak Leaves 2 September 1944	—
Gerhard Florin	Heer	Hauptmann of the Reserves	Commander of the II./Schützen-Regiment 111	2 February 1942	—	—
Wilhelm Florschütz? (Note: Wilhelm Florschütz's nomination was received on 7 March 1945—according to the book "Verliehene Ritterkreuze" (Awarded Knight Crosses) on 29 March 1945—by the Heerespersonalamt (HPA—Army Staff Office). Major Joachim Domaschk approved the nomination but decided "postponed!" noting Heeresgruppe B, so according to AHA Ziff. 275 (Allgemeines Heeresamt — General Army Office). A presentation was never made. According to the Association of Knight's Cross Recipients (AKCR) the award was presented in accordance with the Dönitz-decree. This is illegal according to the Deutsche Dienststelle (WASt) and lacks legal justification. The presentation date was assigned by Walther-Peer Fellgiebel.)	Heer	Hauptmann	Commander of Volks-Pionier-Brigade 47 (motorized)	9 May 1945	—	—
Jürgen von Flotow	Heer	Oberleutnant	Leader of the 1./Schützen-Regiment 8	25 August 1941*	Died of wounds 20 August 1941	—
Hans Flügel	Waffen-SS	SS-Hauptsturmführer of the Reserves	Leader of the II./SS-Panzer-Regiment 5 "Wiking" (Note: According to Scherzer as leader of the II./SS-Panzer-Regiment 5.)	16 October 1944	—	—
Otto Flügel	Kriegsmarine	Steuermannsmaat of the Reserves	Coxswain on Vorpostenboot VP-1525 in the 15. Vorpostenflottille	3 May 1943	—	
Friedrich Fluhs	Heer	Oberfeldwebel	Zugführer (platoon leader) in the 5./Grenadier-Regiment 255	4 November 1943	—	—
Dr. phil. Fritz Focke	Heer	Major of the Reserves	Commander of the I./Grenadier-Regiment 368	28 March 1945	—	—
Adrian Baron von Foelkersam	Heer	Leutnant of the Reserves	Adjutant in the Stab of the I./Lehr-Regiment z.b.V. 800 "Brandenburg"	14 September 1942	—	
Otto Fönnekold	Luftwaffe	Fahnenjunker-Feldwebel	Pilot in the II./Jagdgeschwader 52	26 March 1944	—	—
Ernst Förderer	Heer	Hauptmann (Note: According to Scherzer as Hauptmann of the Reserves.)	Commander of the II./Grenadier-Regiment 1082	11 March 1945	—	—
Friedrich Förster	Heer	Hauptmann	Leader of Kampfgruppe "Derrer" (Note: According to Scherzer as leader of Kampfgruppe "Derrer" in the 6. Armee.)	24 December 1944	—	—
Hans-Joachim Förster	Kriegsmarine	Oberleutnant zur See	Commander of U-480	18 December 1944	—	—
Helmuth Förster	Luftwaffe	General der Flieger	Commanding general of the I. Fliegerkorps	22 February 1942	—	—
Otto-Hermann Förster	Heer	General der Pioniere	Commanding general of the VI. Armeekorps	23 August 1941	—	—
Otto-Lutz Förster	Luftwaffe	Oberst (Note: According to Scherzer as Oberst of the Luftwaffentransportführer (air transport leader) II with Luftflotte 4.)	Luftwaffentransportführer (air transport leader) with Luftflotte 4	23 December 1942	—	—
Friedrich Foertsch	Heer	Generalmajor	Chief of the Generalstab 18. Armee	5 September 1944	—	
Hermann Foertsch	Heer	Generalleutnant	Commander of the 21. Infanterie-Division	27 August 1944	—	
Josef Fözö	Luftwaffe	Hauptmann	Gruppenkommandeur of the II./Jagdgeschwader 51	2 July 1941	—	—
Richard Foldenauer	Heer	Obergefreiter	Company messenger in the 2./Grenadier-Regiment 460	12 November 1943	—	—
Ulrich Folkers	Kriegsmarine	Kapitänleutnant	Commander of U-125	27 March 1943	—	—
Ferdinand Foltin	Luftwaffe	Hauptmann	Commander of the II./Fallschirmjäger-Regiment 3	9 June 1944	—	
Otto Fondermann	Heer	Hauptmann	Commander of the II./Schützen-Regiment 79	13 October 1941	—	—
Heinz Forgatsch	Luftwaffe	Oberleutnant	Pilot in the Kampfgruppe 806 (Note: According to Scherzer as pilot in the 2./Küstenflieger-Gruppe 806.)	14 June 1941	—	—
Werner Forst+	Heer	Generalleutnant	Commander of the 106. Infanterie-Division	29 August 1943	Awarded 407th Oak Leaves 22 February 1944	—
Gustav Forstmann	Kriegsmarine	Korvettenkapitän	Chief of the 1. Räumbootflottille	28 July 1941	—	
Rupert Forstner	Heer	Feldwebel	Zugführer (platoon leader) in the 2./Grenadier-Regiment 19 "List"	3 November 1944	—	—
Siegfried Freiherr von Forstner	Kriegsmarine	Kapitänleutnant	Commander of U-402	9 February 1943	—	—
Horst Fortun	Heer	Hauptmann	Commander of the I./Panzer-Regiment 25	7 August 1943*	Killed in action 6 July 1943 (Note: According to Scherzer died of wounds on 17 July 1943.)	—
Hans-Werner Forwerk	Heer	Hauptmann of the Reserves	Leader of the I./Grenadier-Regiment 187	14 April 1945	—	—
Hans Frach	Luftwaffe	Oberfeldwebel	Pilot in the 6./Kampfgeschwader 51	29 October 1944	—	—
Edmund Francois	Luftwaffe	Hauptmann	Commander of Panzergrenadier-Brigade "von Werthern" in the Fallschirm-Panzer-Division "Hermann Göring" (Note: According to Scherzer as commander of Panzergrenadier-Brigade "von Werthern" Kampfgruppe made up of parts from the Führer-Begleit-Bataillon and Führer-Flak-Abteilung (Luftwaffe).)	20 October 1944	—	—
Gustav Francsi	Luftwaffe	Leutnant	Pilot in the I./Nachtjagdgeschwader 100 (Note: According to Scherzer as pilot in the 1./Nachtjagdgeschwader 100.)	29 October 1944	—	—
Dr. rer.pol. Friedrich Franek	Heer	Oberst	Commander of Infanterie-Regiment 405	4 November 1941	—	—
Anton-Otto Frank+	Heer	Hauptmann	Chief of the 1./Panzer-Jagd-Abteilung (SF) 15 (Note: According to Scherzer as chief of the 1./Panzer-Jagd-Abteilung 15.)	26 June 1944	Awarded 737th Oak Leaves 7 February 1945	—
Erich Frank	Heer	Hauptmann of the Reserves	Commander of the III./Grenadier-Regiment 116	24 June 1944	—	—
Hans-Dieter Frank+	Luftwaffe	Hauptmann	Staffelkapitän of the 2./Nachtjagdgeschwader 1	20 June 1943	Awarded 417th Oak Leaves 2 March 1944	—
Heinz Frank+	Luftwaffe	Oberleutnant	Staffelkapitän of the 3./Sturzkampfgeschwader 1	3 September 1942	Awarded 172nd Oak Leaves 8 January 1943	—
Otto Frank	Heer	Major	Commander of the I./Grenadier-Regiment 278	18 October 1943	—	—
Robert Frank	Waffen-SS	SS-Sturmbannführer	Commander of the II./SS-Panzergrenadier-Regiment 20 "Hohenstaufen" (Note: According to Scherzer as commander of the II./SS-Panzergrenadier-Regiment 20.)	4 June 1944*	Killed in action 13 April 1944	—
Rudolf Frank+	Luftwaffe	Feldwebel	Pilot in the 2./Nachtjagdgeschwader 3	6 April 1944	Awarded 531st Oak Leaves 20 July 1944	—
Walter Frank	Heer	Oberfeldwebel	Zugführer (platoon leader) of the 2./schwere Panzer-Jagd-Abteilung 666 (Note: According to Scherzer as Zugführer (platoon leader) of the 2./schwere Heeres-Panzer-Jagd-Abteilung 666.)	7 February 1944	—	—
Adolf Franke (Note: According to Scherzer correct name is Alois Albert Frankl who received the Knight's Cross of the Iron Cross in the 6./Wach-Regiment "Großdeutschland" in the fortress Berlin.)	Heer	Unteroffizier	In the Wach-Regiment "Großdeutschland" in the fortress Berlin	26 April 1945	—	—
Alfred Franke	Luftwaffe	Oberfeldwebel	Pilot in the 2./Jagdgeschwader 53	29 October 1942*	Killed in action 9 September 1942	—
Heinz Franke	Kriegsmarine	Kapitänleutnant	Commander of U-262	30 November 1943	—	—
Herbert Franke	Heer	Hauptmann	Commander of the I./Artillerie-Regiment 162	5 October 1943	—	—
Kurt Franke	Waffen-SS	SS-Hauptscharführer	Shock troops leader in the 11./SS-Panzergrenadier-Regiment 6 "Theodor Eicke"	3 October 1943	—	—
Werner Franken	Luftwaffe	Oberleutnant	Pilot in the I./Kampfgeschwader 26	24 March 1943	—	—
Wilhelm Franken	Kriegsmarine	Kapitänleutnant	Commander of U-565	30 April 1943	—	—
Erwin Frankenfeld	Heer	Leutnant	Leader of the 1./Jäger-Regiment 49	23 March 1945	—	—
Bruno Frankewitz+	Heer	Generalleutnant	Commander of the 215. Infanterie-Division	29 February 1944	Awarded 790th Oak Leaves 16 March 1945	—
Gotthard Frantz	Luftwaffe	Generalleutnant	Commander of the 19. Flak-Division (motorized tropical) "Afrika"	18 May 1943	—	—
Peter Frantz+	Heer	Oberleutnant	Assault gun commander in the 16./Infanterie-Regiment "Großdeutschland" (motorized) (Note: According to Scherzer as chief of the 16.(Sturmgeschütz)/Infanterie-Regiment (motorized) "Großdeutschland".)	4 June 1942	Awarded 228th Oak Leaves 14 April 1943	—
Botho von Frantzius	Heer	Oberstleutnant	Commander of Grenadier-Regiment 504	4 November 1941	—	—
Egon Franz	Waffen-SS	SS-Unterscharführer	Zugführer (platoon leader) in the 3./SS-Panzergrenadier-Regiment 9 "Germania"	16 October 1944	—	—
Gerhard Franz	Heer	Oberstleutnant im Generalstab	Ia (operations officer) of the 29. Infanterie-Division (motorized)	24 July 1941	—	—
Ludwig Franz	Heer	Hauptmann of the Reserves	Leader of the I./Grenadier-Regiment 35	8 October 1943	—	
[Prof. Dr.] Ludwig Franzisket (Note: The brackets around the professor and doctor title [Prof. Dr.] denotes that the academic title was attained after the Knight's Cross of the Iron Cross was awarded.)	Luftwaffe	Oberleutnant	Adjutant of the I./Jagdgeschwader 27	20 July 1941 (Note: According to Scherzer on 23 July 1941.)	—	—
Ernst Fraps	Heer	Obergefreiter	Richtschütze (gunner) in the 2./Panzer-Jagd-Abteilung 28	18 May 1942	—	—
Fritz Frauenheim	Kriegsmarine	Kapitänleutnant	Commander of U-101	29 August 1940	—	—
Franz Frauscher	Waffen-SS	SS-Hauptscharführer	Zugführer (platoon leader) in the 4./SS-Panzer-Regiment 2 "Das Reich" (Note: According to Scherzer as Zugführer (platoon leader) in the 4./SS-Panzer-Regiment 2.)	31 December 1944	—	—
Ferdinand Frech	Heer	Oberleutnant	Chief of the 1./Jäger-Bataillon 2	5 December 1943	—	—
Dipl.-Ing. Reinhard Fredebold	Heer	Major of the Reserves	Commander of the III./Infanterie-Regiment 191	30 August 1942	—	—
Andrejs Freimanis	Waffen-SS	Waffen-Obersturmführer	Leader of the 13./Waffen-Grenadier-Regiment der SS 44 (lett. Nr. 6)	5 May 1945	—	—
Bruno Freitag	Luftwaffe	Oberleutnant	Staffelkapitän of the 3./Sturzkampfgeschwader 2 "Immelmann"	5 October 1941	—	—
Fritz Freitag	Waffen-SS	SS-Brigadeführer and Generalmajor of the Waffen-SS	Commander of the 14. Waffen-Grenadier-Division der SS (Note: According to Scherzer as commander of the 14. Waffen-Grenadier-Division der SS (gal. Nr. 1).)	30 September 1944	—	
Max Fremerey	Heer	Generalmajor	Commander of the 29. Infanterie-Division (motorized)	28 July 1942	—	—
Günther Frenzel	Luftwaffe	Feldwebel	Pilot in the 11./Kampfgeschwader z.b.V. 1 (Note: According to Scherzer as pilot in the III./Kampfgeschwader z.b.V. 1.)	23 December 1942	—	—
Ernst Frese	Heer	Leutnant of the Reserves	Leader of the 6./Grenadier-Regiment 869	27 August 1944	—	—
Maximilian Fretter-Pico+	Heer	Generalmajor	Commander of the 97. leichte Infanterie-Division	26 December 1941	Awarded 368th Oak Leaves 16 January 1944	—
Otto Fretter-Pico	Heer	Generalleutnant	Commander of the 148. Infanterie-Division	12 December 1944	—	
Simon Freutsmiedl	Heer	Feldwebel	Zugführer (platoon leader) in the 9./Jäger-Regiment 204	26 August 1943	—	—
Wilhelm Freuwörth	Luftwaffe	Feldwebel	Pilot in the 2./Jagdgeschwader 52	5 January 1943	—	—
Karl Frewer	Heer	Major	Commander of the I./Grenadier-Regiment 167	12 November 1943	—	—
Albert Frey+	Waffen-SS	SS-Sturmbannführer	Commander of the I./SS-Panzergrenadier-Regiment "Leibstandarte SS Adolf Hitler"	3 March 1943	Awarded 359th Oak Leaves 20 December 1943	—
[Prof. Dr.] Emil Frey	Heer	Hauptmann of the Reserves	Commander of the I./Grenadier-Regiment 220	5 September 1944	—	—
Harry Frey	Luftwaffe	Leutnant	Staffelführer of the 7./Kampfgeschwader 6	5 December 1943*	Missing in action 11 July 1943	—
Hugo Frey	Luftwaffe	Hauptmann	Staffelkapitän of the 7./Jagdgeschwader 11	4 May 1944*	Killed in action 6 March 1944	—
Siegfried Freyer	Heer	Wachtmeister	Zugführer (platoon leader) of the 4./Panzer-Regiment 24	23 July 1942	—	—
Siegfried Freytag	Luftwaffe	Oberleutnant	Pilot in the I./Jagdgeschwader 77 (Note: According to Scherzer as pilot in the II./Jagdgeschwader 77.)	3 July 1942	—	—
Ernst-August Fricke+	Heer	Oberleutnant	Chief of the 7./Infanterie-Regiment 76 (motorized)	17 January 1942	Awarded 341st Oak Leaves 30 November 1943	—
Kurt Fricke	Kriegsmarine	Admiral	Chief-of-staff in the Seekriegsleitung in the Oberkommando der Marine	1 October 1942	—	—
Erwin Frieb	Heer	Leutnant	Zugführer (platoon leader) and Vorgeschobener Beobachter (forward observer) in the 1./Artillerie-Regiment 1558 (Note: According to Scherzer as Vorgeschobener Beobachter (forward observer) in the 1./Artillerie-Regiment 1558.)	19 February 1945	—	—
Helmut Friebe	Heer	Oberst	Commander of Infanterie-Regiment 164	13 August 1941	—	—
Werner Friebe	Heer	Oberst	Leader of an armoured unit of the 8. Panzer-Division (Note: According to Scherzer as leader of the 8. Panzer-Division.)	21 April 1944	—	—
Herbert Friebel	Luftwaffe	Oberfeldwebel	Pilot in the 12./Jagdgeschwader 51 "Mölders"	24 January 1943	—	—
Herbert Friedel	Heer	Wachtmeister	Zugführer (platoon leader) in the 2./Sturmgeschütz-Brigade 232	23 August 1944	—	—
Friedrich Friedmann	Heer	Oberst	Commander of Gebirgsjäger-Regiment 144	12 February 1943	—	—
Theodor Friedmann	Heer	Hauptmann	Commander of the I./Artillerie-Regiment 156	15 August 1940	—	—
Erich Friedrich	Heer	Oberfeldwebel	Company troop leader in the 1./Panzergrenadier-Regiment 33	2 September 1944	—	—
Gerhard Friedrich+	Heer	Hauptmann	Commander of the I./Panzergrenadier-Regiment 13	6 April 1943	Awarded 642nd Oak Leaves 3 November 1944	—
Gerhard Friedrich	Luftwaffe	Major	Gruppenkommandeur of the I./Nachtjagdgeschwader 6	15 March 1945	—	—
Gustav Friedrich	Heer	Rittmeister	Chief of the 6./Reiter-Regiment 31	3 November 1944	—	—
Kurt Friedrich	Heer	Hauptmann	Leader of the III./Grenadier-Regiment 525	13 September 1943	—	—
Max Friedrich	Heer	Obergefreiter	Deputy group leader in the 3./Grenadier-Regiment 558	15 March 1944	—	—
Max Friedrich	Heer	Oberleutnant	Chief of the pioneer company of Division Nr. 408 in Kampfgruppe Jollasse	23 March 1945	—	—
Rudolf Friedrich	Heer	Obergefreiter	Deputy group leader in the 9./Grenadier-Regiment 361 (motorized)	6 October 1944	—	—
Werner Friedrich	Heer	Major	Leader of Grenadier-Regiment 503	26 December 1943*	Killed in action 23 December 1943	—
Gustav Frielinghaus	Luftwaffe	Hauptmann (Note: According to Scherzer as Oberleutnant in the Stab IV./Jagdgeschwader 3.)	Gruppenkommandeur of the IV./Jagdgeschwader 3 "Udet"	5 February 1944	—	—
Anton Fries	Heer	Oberfeldwebel	Leader of the 1./Grenadier-Regiment 1123	28 February 1945*	Killed in action 6 February 1945	—
Herbert Fries	Luftwaffe	Gefreiter	Gun leader in the 2./Fallschirm-Panzer-Jagd-Abteilung 1	5 September 1944	—	
Leonhard Fries	Heer	Oberfeldwebel	Zugführer (platoon leader) in the II./Grenadier-Regiment 1084	14 February 1945	—	—
Walter Fries+	Heer	Oberst	Commander of Infanterie-Regiment 87 (motorized)	14 December 1941	Awarded 378th Oak Leaves 29 January 1944; 87th Swords 11 August 1944	—
Johannes Frießner+	Heer	General der Infanterie	Commanding general of the XXIII. Armeekorps	23 July 1943	Awarded 445th Oak Leaves 9 April 1944	
Dr. med. August Friker	Heer	Oberst	Commander of Grenadier-Regiment 480	4 September 1943	—	—
Helmut Frink	Heer	Hauptmann	Chief of the 9./Artillerie-Regiment 251 (Note: According to Scherzer as chief of the 9./Artillerie-Regiment 291 and killed in action on 30 August 1943.)	21 October 1943*	Killed in action 28 August 1943	—
Heinz Fritsch	Heer	Unteroffizier	In the 2./Panzer-Pionier-Bataillon 37	18 October 1941	—	—
Hans Fritsche+	Heer	Hauptmann	Commander of the II./Grenadier-Regiment 528	10 March 1943	Awarded 307th Oak Leaves 2 October 1943	—
[Dr.] Herbert Fritz	Heer	Hauptmann	Chief of the 16./Gebirgsjäger-Regiment 13	17 March 1944	—	—
Heinz Fritzler	Heer	Leutnant of the Reserves	Leader of the 1./Divisions-Füsilier-Bataillon 110	5 December 1943	—	—
Immo Fritzsche	Luftwaffe	Oberleutnant	Staffelkapitän of the 8./Sturzkampfgeschwader 2 "Immelmann"	16 April 1943	—	—
Bruno Fröhlich	Heer	Feldwebel	Zugführer (platoon leader) in the 7./Grenadier-Regiment 430	22 January 1943*	Died of wounds 16 December 1942	—
Karl Fröhlich	Heer	Oberleutnant	Chief of the 2./Panzer-Abteilung 18	28 September 1943	—	—
Kurt Fröhlich? (Note: No evidence of the award can be found in the German Federal Archives. Presumably the award was presented by SS-Oberstgruppenführer Sepp Dietrich which would make it an unlawful presentation. The date 6 May 1945 was assumed by Fellgiebel. Von Seemen states the 3 May 1945. Kurt Fröhlich is not mentioned in Krätschmer's book "Die Ritterkreuzträger der Waffen-SS" (Knight's Cross Bearers of the Waffen-SS). The author Veit Scherzer was denied access to files, which could help clarify the case, of the Association of Knight's Cross Recipients (AKCR) on the grounds of the Bundesarchivgesetz (German Archive Law).)	Waffen-SS	SS-Hauptsturmführer	Leader of the II./SS-Panzer-Regiment 9 "Hohenstaufen"	6 May 1945	—	—
Stefan Fröhlich	Luftwaffe	Generalmajor	Geschwaderkommodore of Kampfgeschwader 76	4 July 1940	—	
Gottfried Fröhlich	Heer	Oberst	Leader of the 8. Panzer-Division	20 December 1943 (Note: According to Scherzer on 20 October 1943.)	—	—
Ernst Frömming	Luftwaffe	Major	Commander of Fallschirm-Pionier-Bataillon 1	18 November 1944	—	
Friedrich Fromm? (Note: Friedrich Fromm, in connection with the 20 July plot, the failed attempt to assassinate Adolf Hitler, was discharged from the Heer on 14 September 1944. The civilian Fromm was sentenced to death and considered unworthy for military duty by the Volksgerichtshof on 7 March 1945. The loss of his worthiness for military service led to an eternal loss of all honors, ranks and orders.)	Heer	General der Artillerie	Chef der Heeresrüstung und Befehlshaber des Ersatzheeres	6 July 1940	—	
Walter Fromm	Luftwaffe	Hauptmann	Commander of the I./Flak-Regiment 33 (motorized) im DAK (Note: According to Scherzer on 5 July 1941 as commander of the I./Flak-Regiment (motorized) 33.)	9 July 1941	—	—
Rolf Fromme	Heer	Leutnant (Note: According to Scherzer as Leutnant zur Verwendung (for disposition).)	Leader of the 3./Panzer-Regiment 1	29 September 1941	—	—
Erich Fronhöfer	Heer	Oberstleutnant	Commander of Panzer-Regiment 10	24 July 1941	—	—
Rupert Frost	Luftwaffe	Major	Gruppenkommandeur of Nachtschlacht-Gruppe 9	25 November 1944	—	—
Willi Frost	Heer	Oberfeldwebel	Zugführer (platoon leader) in the 4./Panzer-Regiment 15	24 September 1943	—	—
Werner Frotscher	Heer	Oberst	Commander of Grenadier-Regiment 422	11 March 1945	—	—
Carl-Heinz Frühauf	Waffen-SS	SS-Hauptsturmführer of the Reserves	Leader of the II./niederl. SS-Freiwilligen-Panzergrenadier-Regiment 49 "De Ruyter" (Note: According to Scherzer as leader of the II./SS-Freiwilligen-Panzergrenadier-Regiment 49 "De Ruyter".)	4 June 1944	—	—
August Fuchs	Heer	Hauptmann	Leader of a Kampfgruppe in Feld-Ersatz-Bataillon 299	18 February 1945	—	—
Jakob Fuchs	Heer	Unteroffizier	Zugführer (platoon leader) in the 3./Grenadier-Regiment 124	23 October 1944	—	—
Dipl.-Ing. Robert Fuchs	Luftwaffe	Oberst	Geschwaderkommodore of Kampfgeschwader 26	6 April 1940	—	—
Rudolf Fuchs	Heer	Oberfeldwebel	Zugführer (platoon leader) in the 2./Grenadier-Regiment 42	26 August 1943	—	—
Siegfried Fuchs	Heer	Feldwebel	Zugführer (platoon leader) in the 12./Jäger-Regiment 75	15 May 1944*	Died of wounds 11 April 1944	—
Heinrich Füllgrabe	Luftwaffe	Oberfeldwebel	Pilot in the 9./Jagdgeschwader 52 (Note: According to Scherzer as pilot in the III./Jagdgeschwader 52.)	2 October 1942	—	—
Benedikt Fürguth	Heer	Wachtmeister	Battery officer and Vorgeschobener Beobachter (forward observer) in the 3./Artillerie-Regiment 7	23 September 1943	—	—
Helmut Fürguth	Heer	Oberst	Commander of Artillerie-Regiment 221 (Note: According to Scherzer as commander of Artillerie-Regiment 221 (only staff) [since 5 April 1942 Stab/Afrika-Artillerie-Regiment 1].)	28 July 1942	—	—
Bernhard Fütterer	Heer	Leutnant	Deputy leader of a Kampfgruppe of Infanterie-Bataillon z.b.V. 560	26 December 1944	—	—
Helmut Fuhrhop	Luftwaffe	Major	Gruppenkommandeur of the I./Kampfgeschwader 6	22 November 1943	—	—
Georg Fuhrmann	Heer	Hauptmann	Commander of the II./Grenadier-Regiment 501	13 July 1943	—	—
Wilhelm Fulda	Luftwaffe	Leutnant	Zugführer (platoon leader) in the 6./Fallschirmjäger-Regiment 2 (Note: According to Scherzer as Zugführer (platoon leader) in the 6./Fallschirmjäger-Regiment 2 (Gruppe Stein).)	14 June 1941	—	
Fritz Fullriede+	Heer	Oberstleutnant	Commander of Kampfgruppe "Fullriede" in the Panzer-AOK 5 (Note: According to Scherzer as commander of Kampfgruppe "Fullriede" (Stab Panzergrenadier-Regiment 165) in the Panzer-AOK 5.)	11 April 1943	Awarded 803rd Oak Leaves 23 March 1945	
Hans Freiherr von Funck+	Heer	Generalmajor	Commander of the 7. Panzer-Division	15 July 1941	Awarded 278th Oak Leaves 22 August 1943	—
Alois Funk	Heer	Unteroffizier	Group leader in the 5./Grenadier-Regiment 316	15 April 1944	—	—
Heinrich Funk	Heer	Major	Leader of a Kampfgruppe in Berlin	28 April 1945	—	—
Heinz Furbach	Heer	Oberst	Commander of Infanterie-Regiment 58	4 October 1942	—	—
Hans Fuß	Luftwaffe	Leutnant	Pilot in the II./Jagdgeschwader 3 "Udet"	23 August 1942	—	—
