= Rudolf Lüters =

German general

- Born: 10 May 1883; Darmstadt, German Empire
- Died: 24 December 1945 (aged 62); Krasnogorsk, Soviet Union
- Military career
- Allegiance: Nazi Germany
- Branch: German Army
- Rank: General der Infanterie
- Commands: 223rd infantry division XV Mountain Corps
- Conflicts: World War I World War II: Operation Barbarossa; Operation Weiss; Operation Schwarz
- Awards: Pour le Merite; German Cross

Rudolf Lüters (May 10, 1883 – December 24, 1945) was a German general who served in the Wehrmacht, during World War II.

== Biography ==
He joined the Imperial German Army on November 2, 1902 as Fahnenjunker and participated in World War I where he was wounded twice, in September 1914 and in October 1915.

During World War II, he was appointed commander of the 223rd infantry division on May 6, 1941, participating with this unit in the invasion of the Soviet Union until October 19.

On November 1, 1942, he was appointed commander of German troops in the puppet Independent State of Croatia. He was promoted to General der Infanterie on February 1, 1943. He received the German Cross in Gold on April 30, 1943 and became the first commander of the newly created XV Mountain Corps on August 25. He participated in numerous anti-partisan operations in Yugoslavia, notably in Operation Weiss and Operation Schwarz led by Alexander Löhr.

On July 31, 1944, Lüters left the German Army and retired. Captured by the Soviets at the end of the war, he died in detention in USSR on Christmas Eve 1945.

== Sources ==
- Dermot Bradley: Die Generale des Heeres 1921–1945 Band 7 Knabe-Luz, Biblio Verlag, Bissendorf 2004, ISBN 3-7648-2902-8, S. 651–652.

Military offices
Preceded by Generalleutnant Paul-Willi Körner	Commander of 223rd infantry division 6 May 1941 – 19 October 1942	Succeeded by Generalleutnant Christian Usinger
Preceded by None	Commander of XV Mountain Corps; 25 August 1943 – 10 October 1943	Succeeded by General der Infanterie Ernst von Leyser
