= 223rd Infantry Division (Wehrmacht) =

- German: 223. Infanterie-Division
- Logo of the 223rd Infantry Division, later also used by the 275th Infantry Division
- Active: August 1939 - November 1943
- Country: Nazi Germany
- Branch: Heer (Wehrmacht)
- Type: Infantry
- Size: Division

The 223rd Infantry Division (German: 223. Infanterie-Division) was an infantry division of the German Heer during World War II.

== Operational history ==
The 223rd Infantry Division was formed on 26 August 1939 as part of the third wave of deployment in the Dresden area in Wehrkreis IV (Saxony). The division initially consisted of the Artillery Regiment 223 and the Infantry Regiments 344, 385 and 425. The initial divisional commander was Paul-Willi Körner. In September 1939, the division became part of Army Group C (Wilhelm Ritter von Leeb), which guarded the German border to France.

The divisional emblem were two black short-thrusting swords crossed on a blue shield.

In November 1939, the division was transferred east into occupied Poland, where it served on occupation duty in the newly formed Wehrkreis XXI (Posen) until February 1940. The 223rd Infantry Division was then once more transferred to the western frontier in preparation for the Battle of France and served with I Army Corps under 6th Army between March and May 1940. It briefly served in the OKH reserve in the Lower Rhine region. The division took part in the invasions of Belgium and France in May and June, and remained in occupied France after the fighting concluded. It remained in the Bordeaux area until late 1941. On 6 May 1941, Rudolf Lüters became the division's commander. During this time, it served at times with X Army Corps under 6th Army, XXXXIII Army Corps under 9th Army, LIX Army Corps under 7th Army and Higher Command XXXI under 7th Army.

In November 1941, the division was transferred to the Eastern Front and became part of Army Group North. Here, the division took part in the German defensive efforts against the Soviet Red Army's Winter campaign of 1941–42. It joined the Siege of Leningrad and also participated in the Battle of Lake Ladoga from August to September 1942. In June 1942, the division had been weakened by the dissolution of two of its infantry battalions. A third battalion was disbanded in the winter of 1942–43. On 20 October 1942, Christian Usinger became the divisional commander.

The 223rd Infantry Division was redeployed to the Eastern Front's southern sector in 1943. It fought at the Battle for Velikiye Luki and the Third Battle of Kharkov before it was destroyed at the Second Battle of Kiev.

The division was formally dissolved on 23 November 1943 and most surviving personnel became part of the 275th Infantry Division.

== Noteworthy individuals ==
- Paul-Willi Körner, divisional commander starting 26 August 1939.
- Rudolf Lüters, divisional commander starting 6 May 1941.
- Christian Usinger, divisional commander starting 20 October 1942.
