= Walter Petzel =

WW2 German Army general (1891-1963)

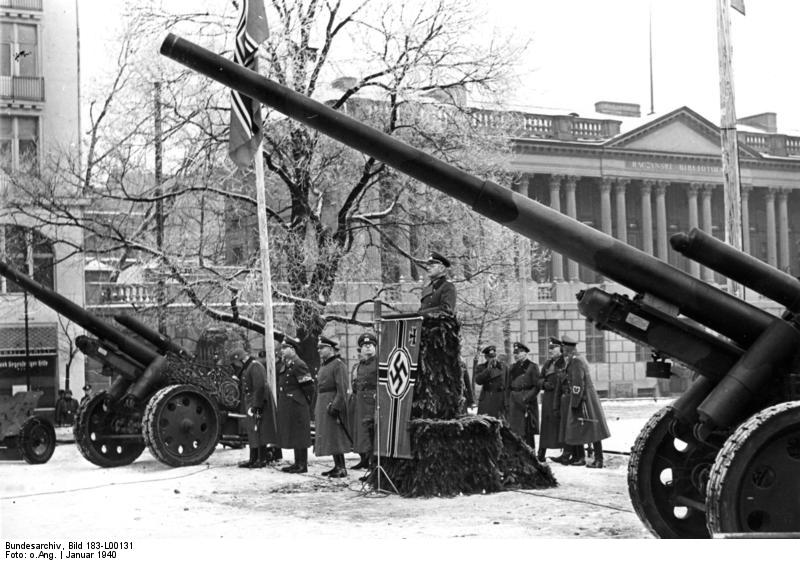
- Petzel at the swearing-in of recruits in Posen in 1940
- Born: 28 December 1883; Oborzysk, Province of Posen
- Died: 1 October 1965 (aged 81); Hamelin, West Germany
- Spouse: Margarete Hauffe (m. 1911)
- Military career
- Allegiance: German Empire; Weimar Republic; Nazi German
- Branch: German Army
- Service years: 1902–1945
- Rank: General der Artillerie
- Commands: I Army Corps; Wehrkreis III; Wehrkreis XXI; Posen Fortress
- Conflicts: World War I: World War II; Invasion of Poland
- Awards: Iron Cross (1914) II and I class; Wound Badge (1918) in Black; Knight's Cross of the House Order of Hohenzollern with swords; German Cross in silver

Walter Petzel (28 December 1883 – 1 October 1965) was a German officer who finished as a General of Artillery in the Second World War.

== Life and early career ==
Petzel was born on 28 December 1883, the son of a landowner, in Oborzysk in the Province of Posen in what is now Poland. He joined the army in 1902 as a Fahnenjunker and, in 1903, was promoted to the rank of second lieutenant in the 1st Posen Field Artillery Regiment Number 20. In 1905, he was posted to the Artillery and Engineer School and, in 1908, became adjutant of the 2nd battalion (Abteilung) of his field artillery regiment. In 1910, he was sent to the Military Riding Institute for 2 years where he was promoted to lieutenant and, shortly thereafter, married Margarete Hauffe on 28 August 1911.

== First World War service ==
Rejoining his regiment in the post of adjutant in 1913, he was sent to the front at the start of the First World War. In September that year he was badly wounded. In November he was promoted to the rank of captain and, in January 1915, was appointed as adjutant of the 10th Field Artillery Brigade. In December 1916, he returned to his Posen regiment, this time as a battery commander. In August 1917, he was appointed as a battalion commander within his regiment. For his service during the war, he was awarded a Knight's Cross of the House Order of Hohenzollern and both Iron Crosses as well as the Wound Badge.

== Inter-war service ==
Following the end of the war, Petzel transferred to the Reichswehr as a captain and initially commanded batteries within the 5th Reichswehr Artillery and 3rd (Prussian) Artillery Regiments. Over the next few years he served as a staff officer within the HQs of 1st Cavalry Division and 3rd Division of the Reichswehr before being promoted to colonel in 1933 and commanding the horse artillery of the Inspectorate of the Cavalry. In 1935 he was appointed briefly as the CO of 76th Artillery Regiment, but only a month later was promoted to major general and appointed as Artillery Commander 3 (Arko 3), a peacetime post in Frankfurt an der Oder and, later, as commander of the 3rd Infantry (or Motorised) Division there. In 1938, he was promoted to lieutenant general and appointed as Inspector of Artillery.

== Second World War service ==
In 1939, as the Wehrmacht mobilised, Petzel took over the I Army Corps as its commanding general and led it during the Invasion of Poland. On 1 October 1939 he was promoted to General of Artillery and Commander I Army Corps, but was almost immediately given command of two military districts, Wehrkreis III and Wehrkreis XXI with his headquarters in German occupied city of Posen (today Poznań). In 1945 he was commandant of the German occupied Posen Fortress, but was retired on 29 January 1945 just before the region was overrun.

== Post-war years ==
Petzel escaped to the west and settled in Hamelin, West Germany, where he died on 1 October 1965.

== Decorations ==
- Iron Cross (1914) II and I class
- Wound Badge (1918) in Black
- Knight's Cross of the House Order of Hohenzollern with swords
- German Cross in silver on 1 October 1943
