= XXVI Army Corps (Wehrmacht) =

Nazi-era German army corps

XXVI. Armeekorps
- Active: August 1939–early 1945
- Country: Germany
- Branch: Army
- Size: Corps
- Nickname: Corps Wodrig
- Engagements: Battle of Mlawa Siege of Leningrad Operation Bagration

Commanders
- Notable commanders: Albert Wodrig

The XXVI Army Corps (German: XXVI. Armeekorps) was a Wehrmacht army corps during World War II. It existed from 1939 to 1945. It was also known as Corps Wodrig (German: Korps Wodrig) during the Invasion of Poland.

== History ==
The XXVI Army Corps was formed under the name Führungsstab z. b. V. under the supervision of AOK 1 in Königsberg on 22 August 1939. Its initial commander was Albert Wodrig, earning it the nickname Korps Wodrig before the official designation as an army corps on 1 October. Wodrig remained in command until 1 October 1942.

During the Invasion of Poland, Corps Wodrig oversaw the 1st and 12th Infantry Divisions, as well as the 1st Cavalry Brigade. Corps Wodrig was stationed in southern East Prussia as part of 3rd Army, commanded by Georg von Küchler. The 3rd Army was in turn under the supervision of Army Group North, commanded by Fedor von Bock. In the opening days of the invasion, Corps Wodrig struck straight south into the units of the Polish Modlin Army in the Mława area. The resulting Battle of Mława ended in German victory. Corps Wodrig advanced further towards Warsaw, assisting the German pincer movement against the Polish capital.

On 1 October 1939, Corps Wodrig was officially redesignated XXVI. Armeekorps, formally upgrading it from a z. b. V. special deployment staff to a full army corps in its own right. In December 1939, XXVI Army Corps was attached to the 6th Army and redeployed to the Lower Rhine area.

In early 1940, the army corps was reshuffled and moved through several armies in quick succession, including the 4th Army, 18th Army and 2nd Army. Under 18th Army, XXVI Army Corps participated on the northern flank of the German invasion force during the Battle of France. The corps fought in the Netherlands and in Flanders. Its initial makeup on 10 May 1940 were the 207th, 254th and 256th Infantry Divisions, as well as the 4th SS Panzergrenadier Regiment. After a brief stay in the Reims area after the German victory over France, the corps was transferred back to its home region, East Prussia. There, its subordinate units remained consistent from 21 July 1940 to 12 March 1941 and were made up by the 161st, 217th and 291st Infantry Divisions.

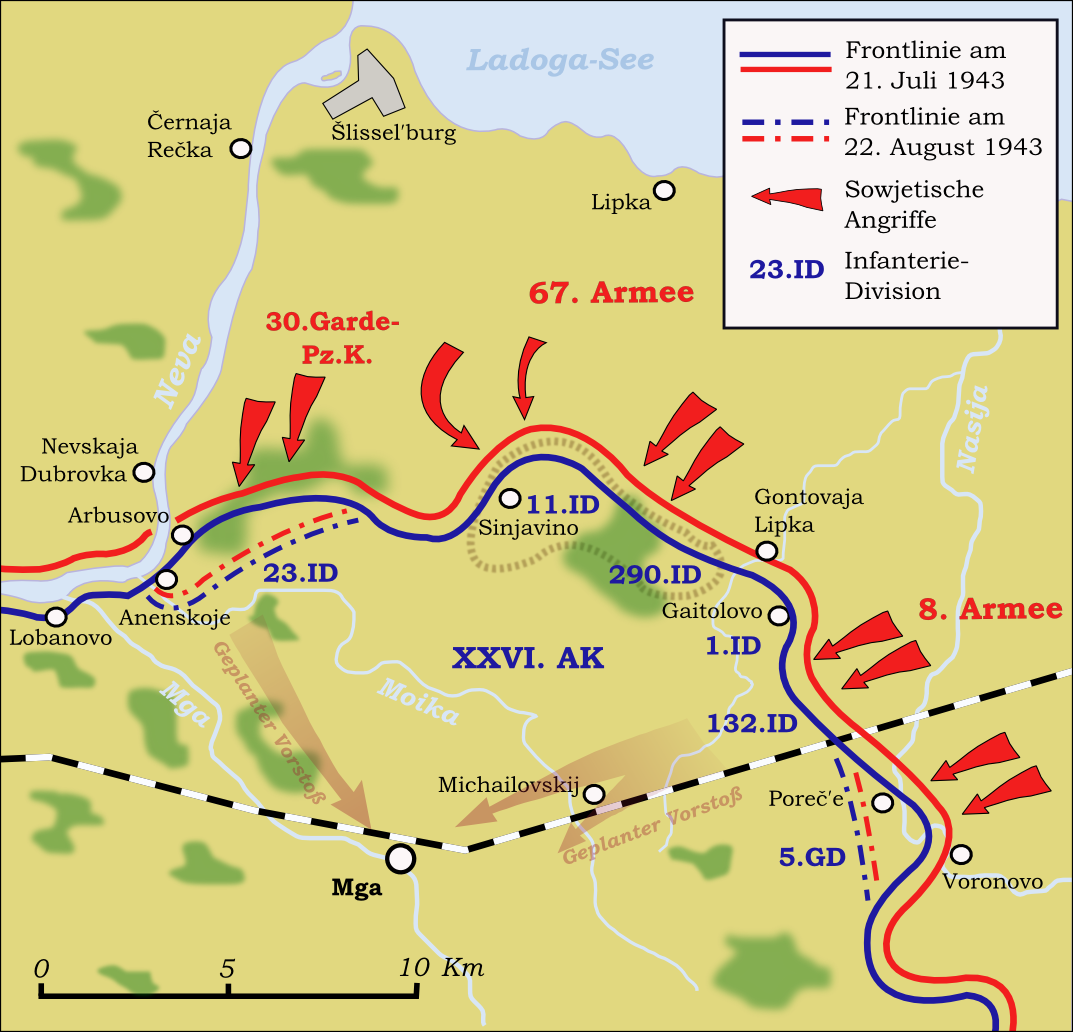
Soviet offensive operations against XXVI Army Corps in mid-1943 (Mga offensive)

For Operation Barbarossa, XXVI Army Corps operated under Army Group North and supervised the 61st, 217th and 291st Infantry Divisions. It advanced through the Baltic region into the Leningrad area. In the German advance towards the city of Leningrad, which was subsequently unsuccessfully besieged until the year 1944, the XXVI Corps advanced on the far left front of the army group, crossing the Luga river from Narva around 24 August 1941 and advancing along the shoreline of the Gulf of Finland, where it eventually stood opposite the Soviet 8th Army, which had been trapped in the Oranienbaum Bridgehead by the advance of German XXXVIII Corps to Petergof and Uritsk.

The XXVI Corps remained in the vicinity of Leningrad throughout the entire duration of the Siege of Leningrad, which was broken by the Red Army on 27 January 1944. Corps commanders switched frequently after Albert Wodrig left his post on 1 October 1942; subsequent corps commanders included Ernst von Leyser, Gustav Fehn, Ernst von Leyser, Carl Hilpert, Martin Grase, Anton Grasser, Gerhard Matzky, Kurt Chill and Gerhard Matzky.

Between July and August 1943, the XXVI Army Corps was the defending unit of the primary urban target of the Soviet Mga offensive. Ultimately, the Soviet attack was repelled.

On 3 March 1944, the XXVI Army Corps joined the newly formed Armeeabteilung Narwa, the army-level promotion of the former LIV Army Corps that was designed to defend the Narva region.

On 15 July 1944, XXVI Army Corps joined the 3rd Panzer Army, making it part of Army Group Centre at the time of Operation Bagration, the Soviet offensive that started on 23 June 1944 and that brought about the total collapse of Army Group Centre. The XXVI Army Corps was pushed back by the Red Army along with the rest of the German armed forces. It was subordinated to the Army High Command East Prussia (AOK Ostpreußen) as of 7 April 1945. At the time of German surrender on 8 May 1945, the remnants of XXVI Army Corps which had been fighting in the corps' home in East Prussia were no longer able to mount an organized resistance against the Red Army.

== Organizational chart ==
Organizational chart of the XXVI Army Corps
Year	Date	Units attached to XXVI Army Corps	Army	Army Group	Operational Area
1939	1 September	1st Infantry, 12th Infantry	3rd Army	Army Group North	East Prussia and Poland
1939	4 December	7th Infantry, 14th Infantry, 253rd Infantry	6th Army	Army Group B	Lower Rhine
1940	15 January	None	4th Army	Army Group B	Eifel
1940	10 May	207th Infantry, 254th Infantry, 256th Infantry, 4th SS Pz.Gren. Regiment	18th Army	Army Group B	Netherlands and Flanders
1940	9 June	34th Infantry, 45th Infantry	2nd Army	Army Group A	Reims
1940	21 July	161st Infantry, 217th Infantry, 291st Infantry	18th Army	Under OKH	East Prussia
1940	1 August	161st Infantry, 217th Infantry, 291st Infantry	18th Army	Under OKH	East Prussia
1940	13 September	161st Infantry, 217th Infantry, 291st Infantry	18th Army	Army Group B	East Prussia
1940	7 October	161st Infantry, 217th Infantry, 291st Infantry	18th Army	Army Group B	East Prussia
1940	7 November	161st Infantry, 217th Infantry, 291st Infantry	18th Army	Army Group B	East Prussia
1940	12 December	161st Infantry, 217th Infantry, 291st Infantry	18th Army	Army Group B	East Prussia
1941	15 January	161st Infantry, 217th Infantry, 291st Infantry	18th Army	Army Group B	East Prussia
1941	10 February	161st Infantry, 217th Infantry, 291st Infantry	18th Army	Army Group B	East Prussia
1941	12 March	161st Infantry, 217th Infantry, 291st Infantry	18th Army	Army Group B	East Prussia
1941	5 April	61st Infantry, 161st Infantry, 217th Infantry, 291st Infantry	18th Army	Army Group B	East Prussia
1941	1 May	61st Infantry, 269th Infantry, 290th Infantry, 291st Infantry	18th Army	Army Group C	East Prussia
1941	5 June	61st Infantry, 217th Infantry, 291st Infantry	18th Army	Army Group North	Riga and Leningrad
1941	1 July	1st Infantry, 61st Infantry, 217th Infantry	18th Army	Army Group North	Riga and Leningrad
1941	7 August	93rd Infantry, 254th Infantry, 291st Infantry	18th Army	Army Group North	Riga and Leningrad
1941	3 September	93rd Infantry, 291st Infantry	18th Army	Army Group North	Riga and Leningrad
1941	2 October	93rd Infantry, 217th Infantry	18th Army	Army Group North	Riga and Leningrad
1941	4 November	93rd Infantry, 217th Infantry	18th Army	Army Group North	Riga and Leningrad
1941	4 December	93rd Infantry, 212th Infantry, 217th Infantry	18th Army	Army Group North	Riga and Leningrad
1942	2 January	93rd Infantry, 212th Infantry, 217th Infantry	18th Army	Army Group North	Leningrad
1942	6 February	93rd Infantry, 212th Infantry, 217th Infantry	18th Army	Army Group North	Leningrad
1942	10 March	93rd Infantry, 212th Infantry, 217th Infantry	18th Army	Army Group North	Leningrad
1942	5 April	93rd Infantry, 217th Infantry	18th Army	Army Group North	Leningrad
1942	11 May	7th Infantry, 223rd Infantry, 227th Infantry	18th Army	Army Group North	Leningrad
1942	8 June	223rd Infantry, 227th Infantry	18th Army	Army Group North	Leningrad
1942	4 July	223rd Infantry, 227th Infantry	18th Army	Army Group North	Leningrad
1942	5 August	223rd Infantry, 227th Infantry	18th Army	Army Group North	Leningrad
1942	2 September	28th Infantry, 170th Infantry, 223rd Infantry, 227th Infantry	18th Army	Army Group North	Leningrad
1942	8 October	28th Infantry, 131st Infantry, 170th Infantry, 227th Infantry, 5th Mountain	11th Army	Under OKH	Leningrad
1942	5 November	24th Infantry, 223rd Infantry, 227th Infantry	18th Army	Army Group North	Leningrad
1942	1 December	24th Infantry, 96th Infantry, 223rd Infantry, 227th Infantry	18th Army	Army Group North	Leningrad
1943	1 January	1st Infantry, 96th Infantry, 170th Infantry, 221st Infantry, 223rd Infantry	18th Army	Army Group North	Leningrad
1943	3 February	11th Infantry, 21st Infantry, 28th Infantry, 61st Infantry, 96th Infantry, 170th Infantry	18th Army	Army Group North	Leningrad
1943	4 March	11th Infantry, 21st Infantry, 28th Infantry, 212th Infantry	18th Army	Army Group North	Leningrad
1943	9 April	1st Infantry, 11th Infantry, 28th Infantry, 69th Infantry, 212th Infantry, 223rd Infantry, 5th Mountain	18th Army	Army Group North	Leningrad
1943	1 May	1st Infantry, 11th Infantry, 28th Infantry, 69th Infantry, 212th Infantry, 223rd Infantry, 5th Mountain	18th Army	Army Group North	Leningrad
1943	1 June	1st Infantry, 11th Infantry, 28th Infantry, 69th Infantry, 212th Infantry, 223rd Infantry, 5th Mountain	18th Army	Army Group North	Leningrad
1943	7 July	1st Infantry, 11th Infantry, 28th Infantry, 69th Infantry, 212th Infantry, 290th Infantry, 5th Mountain	18th Army	Army Group North	Leningrad
1943	5 August	1st Infantry, 11th Infantry, 28th Infantry, 58th Infantry, 69th Infantry, 126th Infantry, 212th Infantry, 290th Infantry, 5th Mountain	18th Army	Army Group North	Leningrad
1943	5 September	21st Infantry, 58th Infantry, 61st Infantry, 69th Infantry, 212th Infantry, 215th Infantry, 225th Infantry, 254th Infantry, 290th Infantry, 5th Mountain	18th Army	Army Group North	Leningrad
1943	4 October	61st Infantry, 69th Infantry, 212th Infantry, 215th Infantry, 227th Infantry, 254th Infantry, 290th Infantry, 5th Mountain	18th Army	Army Group North	Leningrad
1943	8 November	61st Infantry, 212th Infantry, 227th Infantry, 254th Infantry, 5th Mountain	18th Army	Army Group North	Leningrad
1943	3 December	61st Infantry, 212th Infantry, 227th Infantry, 254th Infantry	18th Army	Army Group North	Leningrad
1944	1 January	61st Infantry, 212th Infantry, 227th Infantry, 254th Infantry	18th Army	Army Group North	Leningrad
1944	1 February	None	18th Army	Army Group North	Leningrad
1944	3 March	11th Infantry, 225th Infantry	Armeeabteilung Narwa (formed from LIV Corps)	Army Group North	Narva
1944	15 April	11th Infantry, 58th Infantry, 225th Infantry	Armeeabteilung Narwa (formed from LIV Corps)	Army Group North	Narva
1944	15 May	11th Infantry, 58th Infantry, 225th Infantry	Armeeabteilung Narwa (formed from LIV Corps)	Army Group North	Narva
1944	15 June	170th Infantry, 225th Infantry, 227th Infantry	Armeeabteilung Narwa (formed from LIV Corps)	Army Group North	Narva
1944	15 July	69th Infantry, 201st Infantry, Generalkommando Rothkirch, 6th Panzer	3rd Panzer Army	Army Group Centre	Lithuania
1944	31 August	1st Infantry, 52nd Infantry, 549th Grenadier, 561st Infantry, Werthern, Schirmer, D	3rd Panzer Army	Army Group Centre	Lithuania
1944	16 September	1st Infantry, 549th Grenadier, D, Schirmer, Werthern	4th Army	Army Group Centre	East Prussia
1944	13 October	1st Infantry, 56th Infantry, 349th Infantry	4th Army	Army Group Centre	East Prussia
1944	5 November	1st Infantry, 56th Infantry, 61st Infantry, 349th Infantry, 549th Volksgrenadier	3rd Panzer Army	Army Group Centre	East Prussia
1944	26 November	1st Infantry, 61st Infantry, 69th Infantry, 349th Infantry, 549th Volksgrenadier	3rd Panzer Army	Army Group Centre	East Prussia
1944	31 December	1st Infantry, 69th Infantry, 349th Infantry, 549th Volksgrenadier	3rd Panzer Army	Army Group Centre	East Prussia
1945	19 February	14th Infantry, 28th Infantry, 349th Infantry, 549th Volksgrenadier, Einem	3rd Panzer Army	Army Group Centre	East Prussia
1945	1 March	28th Infantry, 299th Infantry, 349th Infantry, 24th Panzer	4th Army	Army Group North	East Prussia
1945	12 April	Unclear	AOK Ostpreußen	Under OKH	East Prussia

== Commanders ==
- General der Artillerie Albert Wodrig (22 August 1939 - 1 October 1942)
- General der Infanterie Ernst von Leyser (1 October 1942 - 1 July 1943)
- General der Panzertruppen Gustav Fehn (1 July - 19 August 1943)
- General der Infanterie Ernst von Leyser (19 August - 31 October 1943)
- General der Infanterie Carl Hilpert (31 October 1943 - 1 January 1944)
- General der Infanterie Martin Grase (1 January - 15 February 1944)
- General der Infanterie Anton Grasser (15 February - 11 May 1944)
- General der Artillerie Wilhelm Berlin (11 May - 15 June 1944)
- General der Infanterie Anton Grasser (15 June - 6 July 1944)
- General der Infanterie Gerhard Matzky (6 July 1944 - May 1945)
