= 549th Volksgrenadier Division =

549th Grenadier Division (11 July 1944); 549th Volksgrenadier Division (9 October 1944)
- Active: 11 July 1944 – May 1945
- Country: Nazi Germany
- Branch: Army
- Type: Infantry (Volksgrenadier)
- Size: 6,200 men
- Garrison/HQ: Schwerin
- Engagements: World War II: Gumbinnen Operation; East Prussian Offensive

The 549th Volksgrenadier Division (German: 549. Volksgrenadier-Division) was a volksgrenadier infantry division of the German Army during World War II, active from 1944 to 1945. It was formed as the 549th Grenadier Division in July 1944 and became a volksgrenadier division several months later. Fighting on the Eastern Front, it was nearly destroyed in the East Prussian Offensive, with its remnants retreating west and surrendering to American troops at the end of the war.

== Operational history ==
549th Division movements, 1944-1945

The 549th Grenadier Division was formed at Schwerin from replacement troops in Wehrkreis II on 11 July 1944. The division was commanded by Oberst Karl Jank, previously with 4th Mountain Division, destroyed during the Soviet Crimean Offensive.

The division was composed of the 1097th, 1098th, and 1099th Grenadier Regiments and the 1549th Artillery Regiment, in addition to smaller support units.

As a volksgrenadier division, manpower shortages meant its infantry regiments contained two battalions, rather than the standard three. The battalions were meant to be used as defensive units that could be formed and trained quickly, with a reduced complement of artillery and an increased number of submachine guns and anti-tank rockets. Composed largely of men previously considered unfit for military service due to age or medical conditions, it lacked a core of veterans who could impart combat experience.

The division was sent to the front in August, fighting in Lithuania with XXVI Army Corps, part of the 3rd Panzer Army, an element of Army Group Centre. On 16 August, Operation Doppelkopf began, an armored counterattack attempting to reunite Army Group North, and Army Group Centre. The 549th and 561st Volksgrenadier Division were tasked with the defence of XXVI Army Corps' line on the southern flank of the army. Holding positions on the flank of 6th Panzer Division, both were forced to retreat by attacks made by elements of the Soviet 11th Guards, 33rd, and 5th Armies. As a result, the 1st Infantry Division had to be diverted to support XXVI Army Corps, instead of participating in Doppelkopf.

In September, the corps was transferred to the 4th Army, where it served with XXVII Army Corps. The Soviet Memel Offensive left Army Group North trapped in the Courland Pocket, and forced the 549th to retreat into East Prussia, after very heavy losses. On 9 October, the division was redesignated 549th Volksgrenadier Division, part of the 32nd wave of infantry divisions formed during the war. Their stubborn defence during the retreat, and Jank's performance led to his promotion as Generalmajor on 10 October.

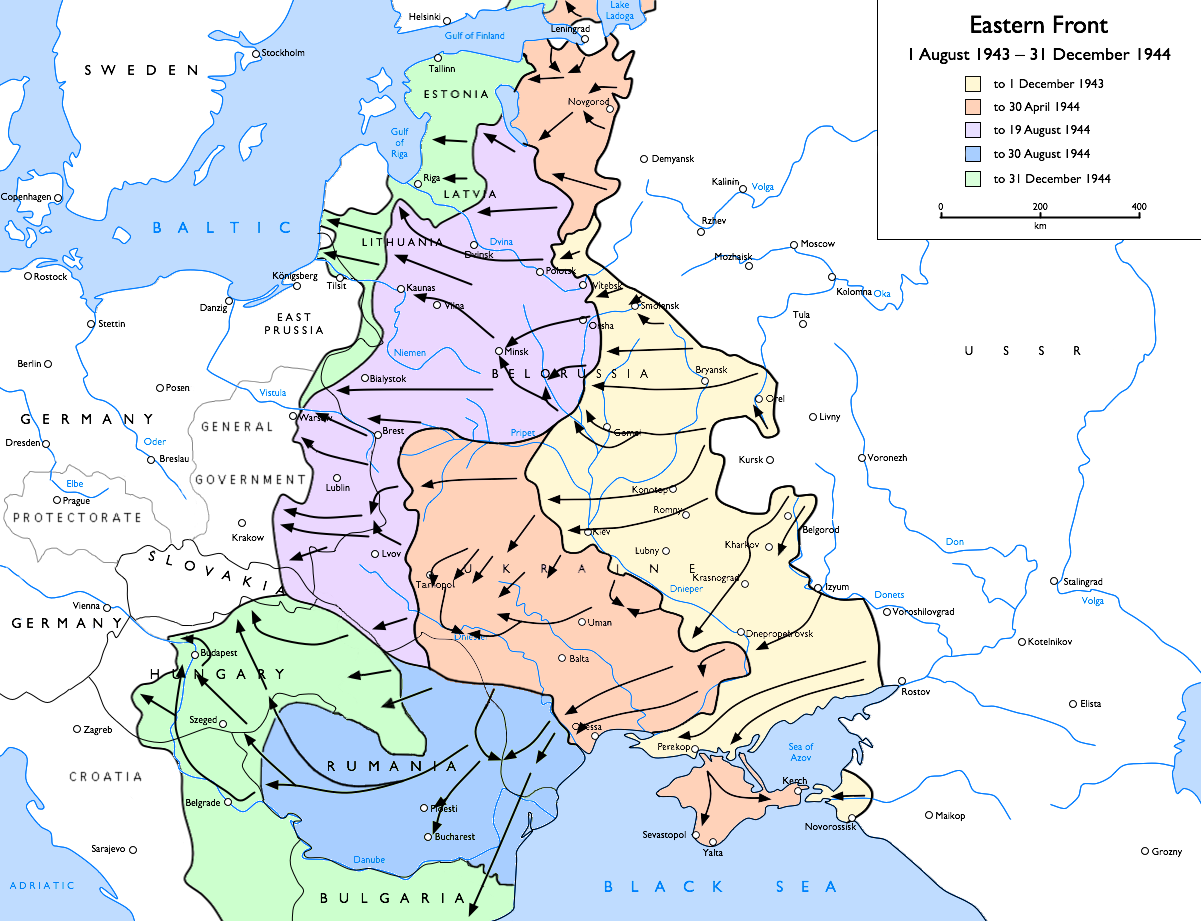
The Eastern Front, August 1943 to December 1944

On 16 October, the Red Army launched its first attack on East Prussia, the Gumbinnen Operation, the 549th defending positions north of Eydtkau. It was gradually pushed back by the 11th Guards Army, but prevented a breakthrough; 11th Guards captured Eydtkau the next day, exposing the southern flank of the 549th. Elements of the division retreated west to Ebenrode, where the reserve 103rd Panzer Brigade launched a counterattack that halted the Soviet advance, which was shifted south towards Nemmersdorf due to boggy ground. For the next several days the division held on between Ebenrode and Schlossberg with the support of the 276th Assault Gun Brigade, as the Soviet offensive came to an end. In October, it returned to XXVI Army Corps, still part of 3rd Panzer Army.

When the Soviet East Prussian Offensive began on 12 January 1945, the division held positions northeast of Gumbinnen. Attacks by the Soviet 3rd Guards Rifle Corps broke through its defenses, exposing the northern flank of the neighbouring 61st Infantry Division. Its losses meant the 549th transferred responsibility for part of its sector to 5th Panzer Division on 15 January. Over the next two days, the division continued to be the target of Soviet attacks, repulsed with support from 5th Panzer.

They were finally over-run on 19 January by 11th Guards and 2nd Guards Tank Corps; on 20th, the survivors established new defensive positions in the Eichwald forest, east of the Inster valley, together with the 349th Volksgrenadier Division. Its remains and XXVI Army Corps were assigned to 4th Army as part of Army Group North later in January, and in February they became part of the reserve of 2nd Army of Army Group Vistula, fighting in West Prussia. The division was rebuilt with II. and III. Pommern Regt. 4, Volkssturm battalions 26/11, 26/29 and 26/70, a Marine Alarm Battalion, a HJ Battalion, part of recce battalion of 4th Polizei Division, a battalion of 5th Jäger Division. After being rebuilt at Pasewalk in March 1945, a kampfgruppe formed from the division joined XXXII Army Corps of the 3rd Panzer Army later that month, fighting on the Stettin front. Colonel Kraus became acting commander of the division in April. As late as 20 April, the division still numbered roughly 6,200 personnel, and was equipped with 32 mortars, 76 guns, and 12 assault guns. It was thrown into the fighting east of the Randow river on 25 April, suffering heavy casualties. The 549th surrendered to American troops in Mecklenburg on 8 May 1945.

== Sources ==
- Buttar, Prit (2010). Battleground Prussia: The Assault on Germany's Eastern Front 1944–45. Oxford: Osprey. ISBN 978-1-84908-190-0.
- Buttar, Prit (2013). Between Giants: The Battle for the Baltics in World War II. Oxford: Osprey. ISBN 978-1-78096-163-7.
- Mitcham, Samuel W. (2007a). The German Defeat in the East: 1944-45. Mechanicsburg, PA, United States: Stackpole Books. ISBN 978-0-8117-3371-7.
- Mitcham, Samuel W. (2007b). German Order of Battle, Volume Two: 291st–999th Infantry Divisions, Named Infantry Divisions, and Special Divisions in WWII. Mechanicsburg, PA, United States: Stackpole Books. ISBN 978-0-8117-3437-0.
- Pipes, Jason. "Karl Jank". Feldgrau.
- Raus, Erhard (2005). Panzer Operations: The Eastern Front Memoir of General Raus, 1941-1945. Da Capo Press. ISBN 978-0306814099.
- Soviet General Staff (2016). The Berlin Operation 1945. Edited and translated by Richard W. Harrison. Solihull: Helion. ISBN 9781912174621.
- Tessin, Georg (1975). Verbände und Truppen der deutschen Wehrmacht und Waffen-SS im Zweiten Weltkrieg 1939–1945 [Formations and Units of the German Wehrmacht and Waffen-SS in World War II, 1939–1945: Volume 10: The land forces. 371-500] (in German). Vol. 10: Die Landstreitkräfte. Nr. 371–500. Osnabrück: Biblio Verlag. ISBN 3-7648-1002-5.
