= Ernst von Leyser =

German general (1889–1962)

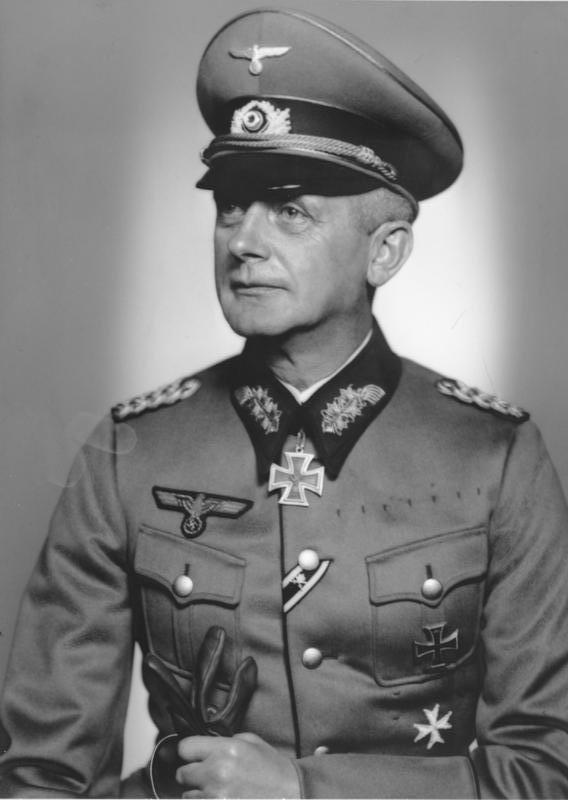
- Ernst von Leyser in 1941
- Born: 18 November 1889; Steglitz, Brandenburg, German Empire
- Died: 23 September 1962 (aged 72); Garstedt, Lower Saxony, West Germany
- Military career
- Allegiance: German Empire; Weimar Republic; Nazi Germany
- Branch: Prussian Army; Reichswehr; German Army
- Service years: 1909–45
- Rank: General der Infanterie
- Commands: 269th Infantry Division; XXVI Army Corps; XV Mountain Corps; XXI Mountain Corps
- Conflicts: World War I; World War II; Battle of France; Operation Barbarossa; Battle of Leningrad; Raid on Drvar
- Awards: Knight's Cross of the Iron Cross

Ernst Ulrich Hans von Leyser (German pronunciation: [ˈeʁnst ˈuːlʁiːx ˈxans fon ˈlaɪsa]) (18 November 1889 – 23 September 1962) was a German general in the Wehrmacht of Nazi Germany during World War II who commanded several army corps.

After the war, in 1947, Leyser was tried for war crimes committed in the Balkans and sentenced to ten years of imprisonment during the Hostages Trial; his sentence was commuted to time served and he was released in 1951.

== Life ==
=== World War II ===
During the invasion of France, Leyser commanded a regiment. In April 1941 he was appointed commander of the 269th Infantry Division. As part of the Army Group North, the division fought in northern Soviet Union after the launching of Operation Barbarossa. On 18 September 1941 he was awarded the Knight's Cross of the Iron Cross and command of the XXVI Army Corps during the siege of Leningrad.

On 1 December 1942 Leyser assumed command of the XXVI Army Corps. Almost a year later, he was assigned to lead the XV Mountain Army Corps, which was fighting against Yugoslav partisans in Croatia. On 20 July 1944 (coincidentally, the day of the failed assassination of Adolf Hitler) he switched command with General Gustav Fehn, commander of the XXI Mountain Army Corps (Germany) in the Balkans.

On 29 April 1945, he was relieved of command. Leyser was arrested by the United States forces on 8 May.

=== Trial and conviction ===
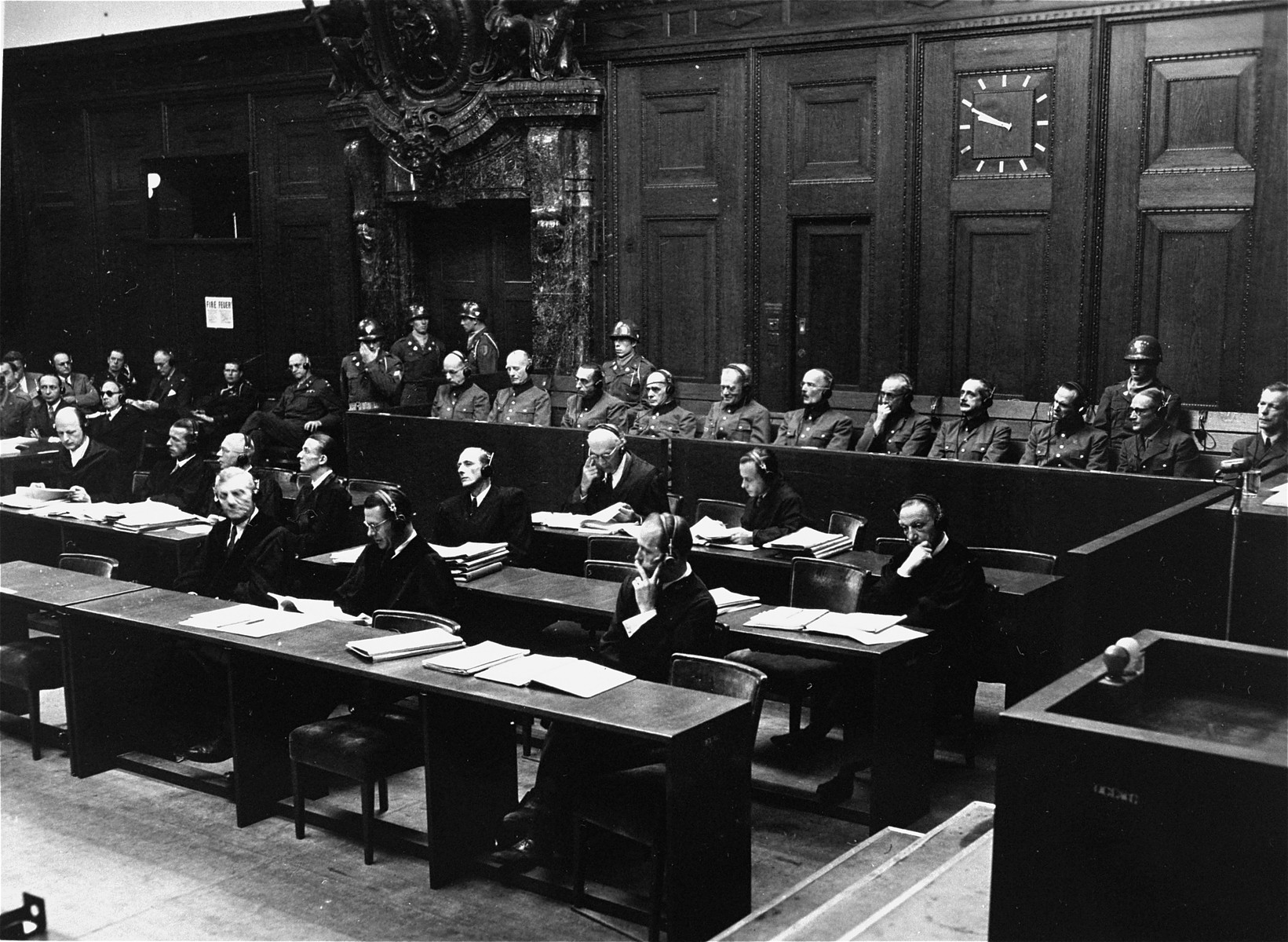
Ernst von Leyser (fourth from right) during the Hostages Trial

Leyser was tried, as subordinate to General Lothar Rendulic, along with 12 other high-ranking German officers in the Hostages Trial, from 13 May 1947 to 19 February 1948. He was found guilty on two charges of crimes against humanity and war crimes: murder and mistreatment of POWs and murder and mistreatment of civilians. Leyser was sentenced to 10 years of imprisonment in December 1947. On 31 January 1951, John J. McCloy, the US High Commissioner in Germany, revised his sentence to time served.

== Death ==
Leyser died in Garstedt on 23 September 1962, at the age of 73.

== Awards ==
- Iron Cross (1914) 2nd and 1st Class
- House Order of Hohenzollern, Knight's Cross with swords
- Baltic Cross
- The Honour Cross of the World War 1914/1918 with swords
- Clasp to the Iron Cross (1939) 2nd and 1st Class
- Johanittenorden (Ehrenritter)
- Knight's Cross of the Iron Cross on 18 September 1941 as Generalmajor and commander of the 269. Infanterie-Division
- German Cross in Gold on 14 April 1943 as General der Infanterie and commanding general of the XXVI. Armeekorps

== Sources ==
- Fellgiebel, Walther-Peer (2000) [1986]. Die Träger des Ritterkreuzes des Eisernen Kreuzes 1939–1945 — Die Inhaber der höchsten Auszeichnung des Zweiten Weltkrieges aller Wehrmachtteile [The Bearers of the Knight's Cross of the Iron Cross 1939–1945 — The Owners of the Highest Award of the Second World War of all Wehrmacht Branches] (in German). Friedberg, Germany: Podzun-Pallas. ISBN 978-3-7909-0284-6.

Military offices
Preceded by none	Commander of Infanterie-Regiment 77; 1 April 1936 – 14 July 1936	Succeeded by Oberst Helge Auleb
Preceded by none	Commander of Infanterie-Regiment 169; 25 October 1939 – 31 March 1941	Succeeded by none
Preceded by Generalleutnant Wolfgang; Edler Herr und Freiherr von Plotho	Commander of 269. Infanterie-Division; 1 April 1941 – 31 August 1942	Succeeded by Generalleutnant Curt Badinski
Preceded by General der Artillerie Albert Wodrig	Commander of XXVI. Armeekorps; 1 October 1942 – 1 July 1943	Succeeded by General der Panzertruppe Gustav Fehn
Preceded by General der Panzertruppe Gustav Fehn	Commander of XXVI. Armeekorps; 19 August 1943 – 31 October 1943	Succeeded by General der Infanterie Carl Hilpert
Preceded by General der Infanterie Rudolf Lüters	Commander of XV. Gebirgs.-Armeekorps; 1 November 1943 – 31 July 1944	Succeeded by General der Panzertruppe Gustav Fehn
Preceded by General der Panzertruppe Gustav Fehn	Commander of XXI. Gebirgs.-Armeekorps; 20 July 1944 – 11 October 1944	Succeeded by Generalleutnant Albrecht Baier
Preceded by Generalleutnant Albrecht Baier	Commander of XXI. Gebirgs.-Armeekorps; 25 October 1944 – 29 April 1945	Succeeded by Generalleutnant Hartwig von Ludwiger
