= I Army Corps (Wehrmacht) =

- I. Armeekorps
- Active: 1934–1945
- Country: Germany
- Branch: Army
- Size: Corps
- Garrison/HQ: Königsberg
- Colors: Black & White
- Engagements: World War II → Invasion of Poland: Battle of Mława; Battle of Różan; Siege of Warsaw; → Battle of France → Eastern Front: Courland Pocket

Commanders
- Notable commanders: Walter Petzel; Kuno-Hans von Both; Philipp Kleffel; Otto Wöhler; Martin Grase; Carl Hilpert; Walter Hartmann; Theodor Busse; Friedrich Fangohr; Christian Usinger

The I Army Corps (German: I. Armeekorps) was a corps of the German army during World War II. It was active between 1934 and 1945, and participated in the Invasion of Poland, the Battle of France and the campaigns on the Eastern Front before eventually ending the war trapped in the Courland Pocket.

== Operational history ==
=== Peacetime ===
The I Army Corps General Command (German: Generalkommando I. Armeekorps) was formed in October 1934 from the 1st Division of the Reichswehr. Like the 1st Division before it, the I Army Corps was headquartered at Königsberg in East Prussia. The final commander of the 1st Division, Walther von Brauchitsch, became the first commanding general of I Army Corps on 21 June 1935.

=== Invasion of Poland ===
I Army Corps participated in the Invasion of Poland as part of 3rd Army (operating from East Prussia) of Army Group North, Its subordinate divisions were Panzer Division Kempf (with SS Regiment Großdeutschland and 10th Panzer Regiment), 11th Infantry Division and 61st Infantry Division. Walter Petzel was the corps commander of I Army Corps. 3rd Army operated in two primary directions of attack; whereas XXI Army Corps was to attack in a southwesterly direction against the Polish Pomeranian Army in the Polish Corridor in order to support the attack of 4th Army from the Hinterpommern region into the Corridor, I Army Corps and Wodrig Corps (later redesignated "XXVI Army Corps") instead were aimed southwards against the Polish Modlin Army, which was headquartered at Modlin Fortress and whose forces defended the northern border to East Prussia in strongpoints such as Mława and Różan.

In the morning of 1 September, I Army Corps stood ready in its starting position south of Neidenburg (Polish: Nidzica), with Wodrig Corps in close proximity, southwest of Willenberg (Polish: Wielbark). The two corps crossed the border towards the forces of Modlin Army at Mława, about whose defenses (including anti-tank fortifications) the Germans had gathered intelligence from agents since at least 21 August. In this sector, the Battle of Mława would be fought for the three opening days of the campaign. With 11th Infantry Division in the vanguard, units of I Army Corps crossed the border around 05:00 and met forward resistance from the 7th Company of the Polish 80th Infantry Regiment, which forced a delay on German operations. This time was sufficient for the 20th Infantry Division to collect and organize its forces, scattered as garrisons throughout local villages. As units of the 11th Infantry Division reached the Polish main line of defense, four kilometers north of Mława, they were met with defensive fire from the Polish 78th Infantry Regiment. As Panzer Division Kempf led an assault down the Neidenburg–Mława road with two Kampfgruppen formed from the personnel of SS Regiment Großdeutschland (in what became the first combat engagement of the Waffen-SS in World War II), but met concentrated fire from the Polish 20th Light Artillery Regiment at Uniszki Zawadzkie and had to request armor support. Around 15:00, Panzer Division Kempf brought its tanks of Panzer Regiment 7 to bear against Uniszki Zawadzkie, followed by dismounted Waffen-SS infantry. The attack was slowed when the tanks encountered an anti-tank ditch which the SS infantry had failed to properly report to the armored formations. As Panzer Regiment 7 attempted to find a different path of approach, the German tanks moved laterally across the Polish artillery line and suffered seven tanks (of types Panzer I and Panzer II) lost. This surprisingly high loss of armored vehicle caused Werner Kempf of Panzer Division Kempf to pessimistically report to 3rd Army commander Georg von Küchler that an attack in this sector was hopeless.

On 2 September, Küchler aimed to overcome the obstacles encountered on the previous day by ordering Corps Wodrig to undertake concentrated attacks against the Polish right flank, while I Army Corps was tasked with the continued application of pressure against the main body of the Polish 20th Infantry Division. At the same time, Sturzkampfgeschwader 1 supported German offensive operations with bombing runs against Polish trenches. Two probing attacks by 11th Infantry Division in the afternoon towards the Polish 80th Infantry Regiment were repulsed by dug-in Polish defenders; a similar fate befell an evening strike by 61st Infantry Division against the Polish 78th Infantry Regiment. Meanwhile, Corps Wodrig had made better progress in its flank attack, as the 1st Infantry Division forced the Polish 79th Infantry Regiment into a general withdrawal and the 12th Infantry Division pushed back the Masovian Cavalry Brigade. As a result, 3rd Army commander Küchler now estimated the Polish right flank between Rzegnowo and Przasnysz to be weaker.

In the night of 2/3 September, Panzer Division Kempf of I Army Corps was shifted away from the Neidenburg–Mława road and eastwards to assist the attack of Corps Wodrig. The redeployment and assembly of the unit took until the afternoon of 3 September, partially because of a traffic jam caused by the bulk of the German 1st Cavalry Brigade, which busied itself watering its horses in the center of Chorzele village. Around 16:00 on 3 September, Panzer Division Kempf attacked southwards and pushed against the Polish flank defense provided by the Masovian Cavalry Brigade, whose TK3 tankettes were ineffective against the German armored attack. Having received the news of the German attack on their right flank, the Polish 79th Infantry Regiment withdrew yet further, which allowed the 1st Infantry Division of Corps Wodrig to advance southeast from Grudusk. The Polish 8th Infantry Division, which was marching northwards in the rear to support the 20th Infantry Division, was ordered into a counterattack against the German lines. The 8th Infantry Division's counterattack was poorly organized and proceeded without sufficient flank cover, with broken communications and involved numerous friendly-fire incidents between Polish units.

From 1 to 3 September, I Army Corps records list a total of 392 casualties, including 129 KIA and MIA.

On the morning of 4 September, it became clear to the commander of the Polish Modlin Army, Emil Krukowicz-Przedrzymirski, that the 8th Infantry Division had suffered a significant failure in its attempt to stop the attack by Corps Wodrig and Panzer Division Kempf against the Polish right flank. As the 20th Infantry Division at Mława was now threatened by complete encirclement, the division received orders around 09:00 to abandon the Mława position and to withdraw southwards towards the river Vistula, ending the Battle of Mława with a German victory. The Germans attempted to prevent the withdrawal of the 8th and 20th Infantry Divisions along the Mława–Modlin road; Luftwaffe air raids caused significant Polish losses in manpower and materiel. Only the Polish 21st Infantry Regiment and the Masovian Cavalry Brigade managed to retreat in good order, the rest of the Polish Modlin Army had received a heavy battering during the retreat (as well as during the battle itself).

On 5 September, Panzer Division Kempf was turned eastwards towards Różan. On the easternmost sector of the German-Polish front, the Operational Group Narew (Młot-Fijałkowski) and the Operational Group Wyszków (Kowalski) had not sustained any significant combat with the Germans, as the primary thrust of 3rd Army had been directed southwards. Now however, Army Group North supreme commander Fedor von Bock intended to move the XIX Army Corps (Guderian) of 4th Army from the Polish Corridor via East Prussia into the eastern sector of the front in order to facilitate a breakthrough into the direction of Brest-Litovsk. Panzer Division Kempf was to assist 12th Infantry Division and 1st Cavalry Brigade in their attack against Różan (beginning the Battle of Różan), which began at 10:00 on 5 September against the approximately 3,300 Polish defenders, distributed among two battalions of the 115th Infantry Regiment, part of the Polish 41st Infantry Division of Operational Group Wyszków. In spite of a tenfold materiel superiority, the Germans did not inflict a decisive defeat on the Polish defenders, who repulsed several German attacks over the course of the afternoon. In the night of 5/6 September, the Operational Group's commander Kowalski allowed the 115th Regiment to withdraw across the river Narew.

After the action at Różan, 3rd Army split into two main groups: Corps Wodrig advanced eastwards across the Narew towards Łomża, whereas the I Army Corps advanced towards Pułtusk. The advance of the 11th and 61st Infantry Divisions was very slow, which gave the Polish garrison of Modlin Fortress an additional five days to prepare their defensive positions. The Polish supreme commander, Edward Rydz-Śmigły, threw the Polish northern flank into some disarray on 6 September by mistaking this slow advance for an already-completed encirclement of the Modlin Fortress, and ordered the fortress to adopt a circular defensive tactic while ordering a counterattack by Operational Group Wyszków (which, unbeknownst to Rydz-Śmigły, instead faced the majority of German forces on the northern flank) across the Narew river. Kowalski now ordered a relief effort by his 1st Legions Infantry Division against I Army Corps at Pułtusk, which was garrisoned by the remnants of 13th Infantry Regiment (which had previously unsuccessfully attempted to relieve 8th Infantry Division) of 41st Infantry Division. Thus, only two second-rate battalions remained in Pułtusk. Just as 61st Infantry Divisions probed into the defenses of the city, the vanguard of the 1st Legions Division arrived.

Rydz-Śmigły again misjudged the situation and believed the 1st Legions Division to be heavily threatened by annihilation; accordingly, he ordered the city abandoned. At the same time, Kowalski shifted the 41st Infantry Division back and attempted to replace it with the 33rd Infantry Division, a difficult nighttime relief-in-place operation that both divisions proved incapable of fulfilling. In the night of 6/7 September, the two divisions became entangled with each other, causing significant chaos and confusion. On the German side, battlefield conditions also proved confusing. Corps Wodrig had spent a good amount of time on 6 September after the Polish withdrawal from Różan preparing to attack an empty town; meanwhile, the Waffen-SS forces of Panzer Division Kempf of I Army Corps used a lull in combat activity to massacre 50 Jewish civilians in the village of Krasnosielc. The two main perpetrators of the massacre were later court-martialled. While 3rd Army commander Georg von Küchler had acted swiftly against the massacre perpetrated under his command in this case, he would less than one year later stress the necessity to ensure that any Wehrmacht soldier restrained from interference with SS treatment of Poles and Jews.

On the morning of 7 September, Panzer Division Kempf attacked the 33rd and 41st Infantry Divisions and inflicted heavy casualties; the Polish forces had to withdraw in disarray. Subsequently, Panzer Division Kempf advanced towards Ostrów Mazowiecka, defended by the Podlaska Cavalry Brigade.

On 13 September, von Bock directed Küchler to use the forces of I Army Corps to assist in the completion of the encirclement of the Polish capital city, Warsaw, using the 11th and 61st Infantry Divisions as soon as possible. II Army Corps (Strauß) was ordered to deal with remnants of Polish resistance at Modlin Fortress. In the night of 13/14 September, surviving elements of the Polish Modlin Army reached Warsaw and joined the city's defense.

On the morning of 15 September, the vanguard of I Army Corps reached the outskirts of Warsaw, where the Polish 20th Infantry Division (which the corps had already faced in the Battle of Mława on 1–3 September). 11th Infantry Division attacked the Polish 21st Infantry Regiment in Grochów district, whereas 61st Infantry Division made advances in Praga district against the positions of 20th Infantry Division. In the afternoon, heavy fighting broke out along Grochowska Road.

16 September saw a German demand for Warsaw to surrender; Petzel sent a delegation under a white flag to discuss surrender terms, but Juliusz Rómmel was unwilling to contemplate capitulation at this point. At noon, I Army Corps resumed its attacks against the city's northeastern districts, but attained only very limited progress and suffered several local Polish counterattacks. Neither 3rd Army forces east of the Vistula nor 10th Army forces on the west side were able to win significant breakthroughs into the city's inner perimeters. In the afternoon, orders came from OKH (with consent by Adolf Hitler) to temporarily cease ground attacks in Warsaw, in order to reduce German casualties.

On 26 September, the German main assault against Warsaw began on 06:00 in the morning. Although Polish defenders were still numerous, the eventual outcome was obvious, and a Polish request for a ceasefire to facilitate surrender negotiations was brought in the afternoon on orders of General Rómmel to I Army Corps. While such a ceasefire was not officially accepted, the intensity of ground fighting was significantly reduced after the parley. Tadeusz Kutrzeba arrived at Petzel's HQ on 27 September to discuss surrender terms, while army group commander Fedor von Bock fought with OKH behind the scenes and insisted that 3rd Army be allowed to occupy Warsaw rather than the 8th Army of Army Group South, although 8th Army had carried the majority of military action in the Warsaw area. Although von Bock believed himself victorious, Kutrzeba visited 8th Army in Rakowiec on 28 September at 13:00 to sign the terms of surrender.

=== Battle of France ===
In the Battle of France, I Army Corps was part of the 6th Army and advanced through the Low Countries.

=== Eastern Front ===
On the Eastern Front, I Army Corps participated in Operation Barbarossa as part of 18th Army under Army Group North. It advanced through the Baltic States and eventually ended up in the Volkhov, Nevel and Polotsk sectors. Eventually, the troops of Army Group North were trapped in the Courland peninsula by the Soviet advances; Army Group North was renamed Army Group Courland on 25 January 1945.

On 12 April 1945, I Army Corps, then under Friedrich Fangohr, remained part of 18th Army (alongside II Corps, X Corps, L Corps) of Army Group Courland, which also contained 16th Army.

== Organizational structure ==
Organizational structure of I Army Corps, 1939–45
Year	Month	Army	Army Group	Operational theater
1939	Sep.	3rd Army	Army Group North	East Prussia, Narew river, Bug river
1939	Dec.	6th Army	Army Group B	Lower Rhine area
1940	Jan.	4th Army	Army Group B	Lower Rhine area
1940	May	6th Army	Army Group B	Netherlands, Belgium
1940	Jun.	4th Army	Army Group B	Somme river, Loire river
1940	Jul./Aug.	7th Army	Army Group B	Atlantic coast
1940	Sep./Dec.	18th Army	Army Group B	East Prussia
1941	Jan./Apr.	18th Army	Army Group B	East Prussia
1941	May	18th Army	Army Group C	East Prussia
1941	Jun./Aug.	18th Army	Army Group North	Latvia, Estonia
1941	Sep./Nov.	16th Army	Army Group North	Volkhov sector
1941	Dec.	18th Army	Army Group North	Volkhov sector
1942	Jan./Dec.	18th Army	Army Group North	Volkhov sector
1943	Jan./Sep.	18th Army	Army Group North	Volkhov sector
1943	Oct.	Army group reserves	Army Group North	in reserves
1943	Nov./Dec.	16th Army	Army Group North	Nevel sector
1944	Jan./Sep.	16th Army	Army Group North	Nevel/Polotsk sector
1944	Oct./Dec.	18th Army	Army Group North	Libau (Courland Pocket)
1945	Jan.	18th Army	Army Group North	Libau (Courland Pocket)
1945	Feb./Apr.	18th Army	Army Group Courland	Libau (Courland Pocket)

== Persons ==
- Walther von Brauchitsch, first corps commander after 21 June 1935; later commander-in-chief of the German army.
- Walter Petzel, corps commander from 1 September to 25 October 1939.
- Kuno-Hans von Both, corps commander from 26 October 1939 to 3 March 1942.
- Philipp Kleffel, corps commander from 3 March 1942 to 1 April 1943 and from 15 August to 17 September 1943.
- Otto Wöhler, corps commander from 1 April to 15 August 1943.
- Martin Grase, corps commander from 17 September 1943 to 1 January 1944.
- Carl Hilpert, corps commander from 1 to 20 January 1944 and 1 May to 1 August 1944.
- Walter Hartmann, corps commander from 20 January to 1 May 1944.
- Theodor Busse, corps commander from 1 August 1944 to 9 January 1945.
- Friedrich Fangohr, corps commander from 20 January to 21 April 1945.
- Christian Usinger, corps commander from 21 April to 8 May 1945.

== See also ==
- List of German corps in World War II
