= Albert Wodrig =

German general (1883–1972)

- Born: 16 July 1883; Berlin, German Empire
- Died: 31 October 1972 (aged 89); Bad Oeynhausen, West Germany
- Military career
- Allegiance: German Empire (to 1918); Weimar Republic (to 1933); Nazi Germany
- Branch: Imperial German Army; Reichswehr; Army (Wehrmacht)
- Service years: 1901–1945
- Rank: General of the Artillery
- Commands: 21st Infantry Division; XXVI Army Corps
- Conflicts: World War I World War II
- Awards: Knight's Cross of the Iron Cross; German Cross in Gold

Albert Wodrig (16 July 1883 – 31 October 1972) was a German general during World War II who commanded the XXVI Army Corps, which was initially briefly his namesake ("Corps Wodrig"). He was a recipient of the Knight's Cross of the Iron Cross of Nazi Germany.

Wodrig was born at Berlin in 1883, and he joined the Royal Prussian Army in 1901. He served in World War I and, at the end of the war, he was a Hauptmann in the 26th Field Artillery Regiment. He remained in the peacetime Reichswehr as a career officer. He was promoted to Generalmajor on 1 April 1934 and to Generalleutnant on 1 March 1936. He was the commander of the 21st Infantry Division from 1934 to 1938. During World War II, he commanded XXVI Corps from September 1939 until November 1942 and I Replacement Army Corps in Konigsberg until February 1945, just a few months before the German surrender.

== Awards and decorations ==
- Iron Cross (1914)
  - 2nd class
  - 1st class
- Hanseatic Cross of Hamburg
- Honour Cross of the World War 1914/1918
- Iron Cross (1939)
  - 2nd class
  - 1st class
- German Cross in gold (22 April 1942)
- Knight's Cross of the Iron Cross on 19 July 1940 as General der Artillerie and commander of XXVI Army Corps

Military offices
Preceded by None	Commander of 21. Infanterie-Division; 1 October 1934 – 10 November 1938	Succeeded by Generalleutnant Kuno-Hans von Both
Preceded by None	Commander of XXVI. Armeekorps; 22 August 1939 – 1 October 1942	Succeeded by General der Infanterie Ernst von Leyser
