= Gustav Fehn =

German general during World War II

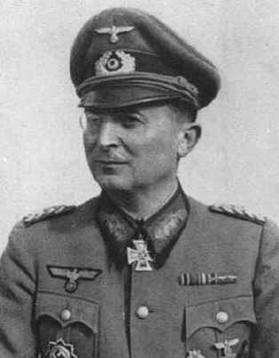
- Born: 21 February 1892; Nuremberg, Kingdom of Bavaria, German Empire
- Died: 5 June 1945 (aged 53); Ljubljana, Democratic Federal Yugoslavia
- Cause of death: Execution by firing squad
- Military career
- Allegiance: German Empire; Weimar Republic; Nazi Germany
- Branch: German Army
- Rank: General der Panzertruppe
- Commands: 5th Panzer Division; Afrika Korps
- Conflicts: World War I World War II
- Awards: Knight's Cross of the Iron Cross

Gustav Fehn (21 February 1892 – 5 June 1945) was a German general during World War II.

Fehn was born in Nuremberg in 1892 and entered the Royal Prussian Army in 1912. He fought in World War I as a junior officer and was awarded the Iron Cross, 1st and 2nd class, the Hanseatic Cross of Hamburg, the Friedrich-August Cross of Oldenburg and the Wound Badge in black. He remained in the peacetime Reichswehr. During World War II, Fehn served in the Afrika Korps from November 1942 to January 1943, LXXVI Panzer Corps from July–August 1943, the XXI Army Corps from October 1943 – July 1944 and then the XV Mountain Corps in the Balkans until his surrender to Yugoslav partisans, who shot him without trial on 5 June 1945.

== Awards ==
- Iron Cross (1914) 2nd and 1st Class
- Iron Cross
  - 2nd Class (20 September 1939)
  - 1st Class (12 October 1939)
- Panzer Badge in Silver
- German Cross in Gold (7 July 19
- Knight's Cross of the Iron Cross on 5 August 1940 as Oberst and commander of Schützen-Regiment 33

Military offices
Preceded by General der Panzertruppe Joachim Lemelsen	Commander of 5. Panzer-Division; 25 November 1940 – 10 August 1942	Succeeded by Generalleutnant Eduard Metz
Preceded by General der Panzertruppen Leo Geyr von Schweppenburg	Commander of XXXX Panzer Corps; 30 September 1942 - 13 November 1942	Succeeded by General der Panzertruppen Sigfrid Henrici
Preceded by General der Infanterie Ernst von Leyser	Commander of XXVI. Armeekorps; 1 July 1943 – 19 August 1943	Succeeded by General der Infanterie Ernst von Leyser
Preceded by General der Infanterie Paul Bader	Commander of XXI. Gebirgs-Armeekorps; 10 October 1943 – 31 July 1944	Succeeded by General der Infanterie Ernst von Leyser
Preceded by General der Infanterie Ernst von Leyser	Commander of XV. Gebirgs-Armeekorps; 1 August 1944 – 8 May 1945	Succeeded by none dissolved on 8 May 1945
