= Paul Fenn =

German naval officer (1891–1976)

- Born: 26 October 1891; Zeven, German Empire
- Died: 10 November 1976 (aged 85); Kiel, West Germany
- Military career
- Allegiance: German Empire; Nazi Germany
- Branch: Imperial German Navy; Kriegsmarine
- Service years: 1914–1919; 1936–1945
- Rank: Leutnant zur See; Kapitän zur See
- Commands: 9th Marine-Flak Regiment; Marine-Flak Brigade I
- Conflicts: World War I; World War II
- Awards: Knight's Cross of the Iron Cross

Paul Friedrich Albrecht Fenn ( 26 October 1891 – 10 November 1976) was a German naval officer who fought in both world wars. He became a Kapitän zur See in the Kriegsmarine during World War II, held field and high staff commands, and was awarded the Knight's Cross of the Iron Cross.

== Early life ==
Fenn was born in Zeven in the Prussian Province of Hanover, obtained his Abitur from the Gymnasium in Stade and studied law and political science at the universities of Heidelberg, Göttingen, and Kiel, completing his studies in the spring of 1914. On 1 August 1914, Fenn enlisted in the Imperial German Army as a war volunteer on the outbreak of World War I, but he transferred to the Imperial German Navy in October. He served in artillery battalions I and IX until May 1916 and then trained with an anti-aircraft artillery detachment. On 18 August 1916, he was commissioned as a Leutnant zur See of reserves in the naval artillery. He served throughout the war with naval artillery battalions as a battery commander and adjutant.

After the end of the war, he left the military and obtained a doctorate in political science (Dr.rer.pol) at Kiel University in 1919. He worked in municipal administration and for industrial concerns, serving from November 1923 as a Syndic (authorized signatory) for Chemische Düngerfabrik, a chemical fertilizer factory in Rendsburg.

On 15 May 1936, Fenn was commissioned as a reserve Oberleutnant zur See in the Kriegsmarine. On 4 June 1937, he was promoted to Kapitänleutnant, and he served as a staff officer at the Marinestation der Ostsee (Baltic Sea Naval Station Command) in Kiel.

== World War II ==
In April 1939, Fenn was promoted to Korvettenkapitän, and he held both field and staff positions during World War II, commanding several naval artillery battalions and working in the naval quartermaster service. In 1940, he was the naval artillery commander at the Oslofjord. From April 1943, he served as Quartermaster I at the Marineoberkommando Ostsee (Baltic Naval High Command), charged with performing the duties of the Oberquartiermeister (senior quartermaster) until the end of March 1944.

From April to July 1944, Fenn headed Sonderstab Fenn ("Special Staff Fenn"), deployed for the evacuation of Finland, and he also served as Deputy Senior Quartermaster. On 19 September 1944, he became commander of the 9th Naval Anti-aircraft Regiment and commander of the Air Defense Command in Gotenhafen (today, Gdynia, Poland). He was promoted to Kapitän zur See on 1 October 1944, and he was awarded the Knight's Cross of the Iron Cross on 23 March 1945, in recognition of having "distinguished himself outstandingly during the heavy fighting for West Prussia". From 19 April 1945 until the end of the war, he commanded the Marine-Flak Brigade I and the Air Defense Command, Kiel.

== Post-war life ==
After Germany's surrender, Fenn was taken as a prisoner of war by British forces. He was released from captivity on 27 January 1946 and subsequently became a commercial director in Kiel, where he served on various administrative committees and boards. Fenn was awarded the Order of Merit of the Federal Republic of Germany first class, on 31 October 1956. He died in Kiel in November 1976.

== Awards and decorations ==
- Iron Cross (1914)
  - 2nd Class (28 July 1918)
- Hanseatic Cross of Hamburg
- Military Merit Medal of Austria-Hungary with swords
- Bulgarian War Commemorative Medal with swords
- Honour Cross of the World War 1914/1918 (9 January 1935)
- Clasp to the Iron Cross, 2nd class (27 April 1940)
- Iron Cross (1939), 1st class
- Naval Artillery War Badge (26 September 1943)
- Wound Badge (1939) in silver
- War Merit Cross with swords
  - 2nd Class (20 April 1943)
  - 1st Class (30 January 1944)
- Knight's Cross of the Iron Cross on 25 March 1945 as Kapitän zur See and commander of the Marine-Flak-Regiment 9
- Order of Merit of the Federal Republic of Germany 1st class (15 October 1956)

== Sources ==
- Dörr, Manfred (1995). Die Ritterkreuzträger der Überwasserstreitkräfte der Kriegsmarine—Band 1: A–K [The Knight's Cross Bearers of the Surface Forces of the Navy—Volume 1: A–K] (in German). Osnabrück, Germany: Biblio Verlag. ISBN 978-3-7648-2453-2.
- Fellgiebel, Walther-Peer (2000) [1986]. Die Träger des Ritterkreuzes des Eisernen Kreuzes 1939–1945 — Die Inhaber der höchsten Auszeichnung des Zweiten Weltkrieges aller Wehrmachtteile [The Bearers of the Knight's Cross of the Iron Cross 1939–1945 — The Owners of the Highest Award of the Second World War of all Wehrmacht Branches] (in German). Friedberg, Germany: Podzun-Pallas. ISBN 978-3-7909-0284-6.
- Marine-Offizier-Verband, ed. (1930). Ehrenrangliste der Kaiserlich Deutschen Marine. 1914–18 [Honor Roll of the Imperial German Navy, 1914–18] (in German). Berlin: Thormann & Goetsch.
