= Ferdinand Foltin =

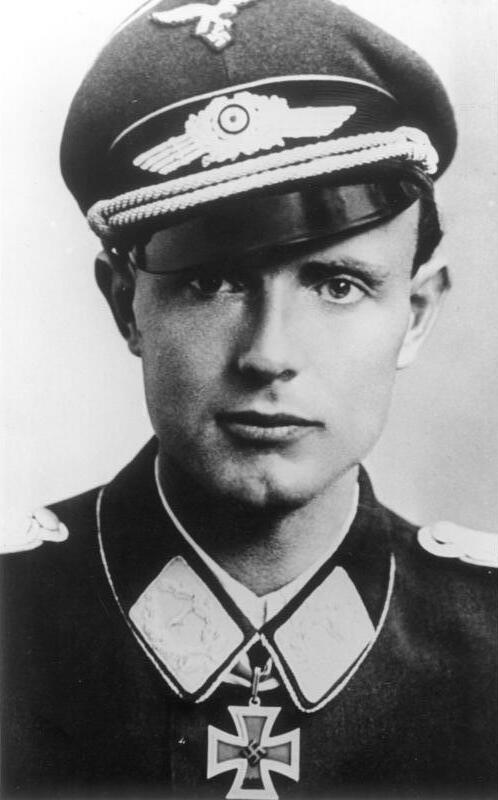
- Born: 30 November 1916
- Died: 18 May 2007 (aged 90)
- Military career
- Allegiance: Nazi Germany; Austria
- Branch: Luftwaffe; Austrian Air Force
- Service years: 1936–1945; 1952–1982
- Rank: Major (Wehrmacht); Generalmajor (Bundesheer)
- Conflicts: World War II
- Awards: Knight's Cross of the Iron Cross

Ferdinand Foltin (30 November 1916 – 18 May 2007) was an Austrian officer in the paratroop forces (Fallschirmjäger) of Nazi Germany during World War II and a general in the post-war Austrian Armed Forces. He was a recipient of the Knight's Cross of the Iron Cross.

== Awards and decorations ==
- Knight's Cross of the Iron Cross on 9 June 1944 as Hauptmann and commander of the II./Fallschirmjäger-Regiment 3
