= Friedrich Fangohr =

German general

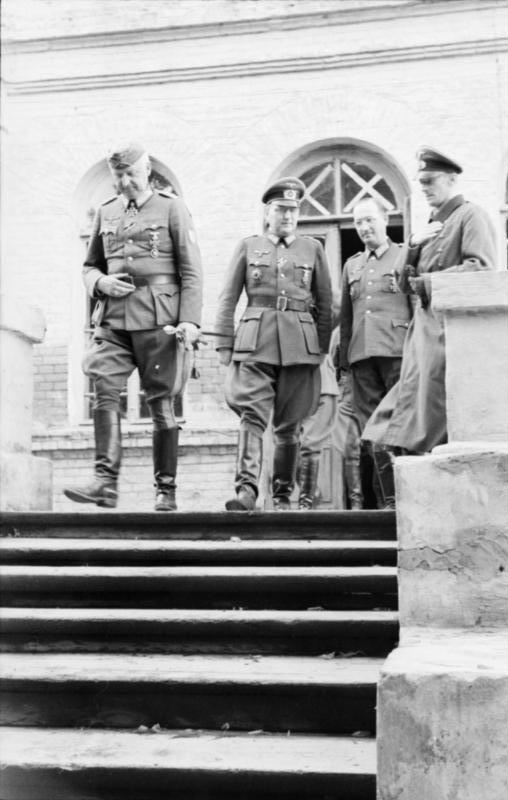
- Fangohr (right) with (from left) Erich von Manstein, Theodor Busse and Hans Speidel in Soviet Union, 1943
- Born: 12 August 1899
- Died: 17 April 1956 (aged 56)
- Military career
- Allegiance: German Empire; Weimar Republic; Nazi Germany
- Branch: German Army
- Service years: 1916–1945
- Rank: General der Infanterie
- Commands: 122nd Infantry Division; I Army Corps
- Conflicts: World War I; World War II; Occupation of Czechoslovakia; Invasion of Poland; Battle of France; Operation Barbarossa; Battle of Białystok–Minsk; Battle of Smolensk (1941); Battle of Moscow; Battle of Stalingrad; Operation Winter Storm; Third Battle of Kharkov; Battle of Kursk; Lower Dnieper Offensive; Courland Pocket
- Awards: Knight's Cross of the Iron Cross

Friedrich Fangohr (12 August 1899 – 17 April 1956) was a general in the Wehrmacht of Nazi Germany during World War II who commanded the I Army Corps. He was also a recipient of the Knight's Cross of the Iron Cross.

== Awards and decorations ==
- Iron Cross (1914) 2nd Class (24 December 1917) & 1st Class (25 October 1918)
- Silesian Eagle 2nd Class (2 July 1919) & 1st Class (23 July 1919)
- Clasp to the Iron Cross (1939) 2nd Class (25 September 1939) & 1st Class (12 October 1939)
- Eastern Front Medal (22 August 1942)
- Knight's Cross of the Iron Cross on 9 June 1944 as Generalleutnant and Chief of Generalstab of Panzer-A.O.K. 4

Military offices
| Preceded by Generalmajor Hero Breusing | Commander of 122. Infanterie-Division; 25 August 1944 – 20 January 1945 | Succeeded by Generalmajor Bruno Schatz |
| Preceded by General der Infanterie Theodor Busse | Commander of I. Armeekorps; 20 January 1945 – 20 April 1945 | Succeeded by Generalleutnant Christian Usinger |
