= Wilhelm Fahlbusch (Flak officer) =

German general and Knight's Cross recipient (1914–2006)

- Born: 8 November 1914; Hanover
- Died: 12 June 2006 (aged 91); Bonn
- Military career
- Allegiance: Nazi Germany (to 1945); West Germany
- Branch: Luftwaffe; German Air Force
- Service years: ?–1945; 1956–70
- Rank: Major im Generalstab (Wehrmacht); Brigadegeneral (Bundeswehr)
- Unit: Flak-Regiment 11 (motorized)
- Conflicts: World War II: Invasion of Poland; Battle of France; Operation Barbarossa; Battle of Kiev (1941); Defence of the Reich
- Awards: Knight's Cross of the Iron Cross

Wilhelm Fahlbusch (8 November 1914 – 12 June 2006) was a highly decorated Major im Generalstab in the Luftwaffe during World War II, and a recipient of the Knight's Cross of the Iron Cross.

== Awards and decorations ==
- Iron Cross (1939)
  - 2nd Class
  - 1st Class
- Anti-Aircraft Flak Battle Badge
- Knight's Cross of the Iron Cross on 31 December 1941 as Oberleutnant and chief of the 8./Flak-Regiment 11 (motorized)
