= Christian Usinger =

WW2 German Army general (1894-1949)

- Born: 21 August 1894
- Died: 2 April 1949 (aged 54); POW camp at Shuya, Soviet Union
- Military career
- Allegiance: German Empire; Weimar Republic; Nazi Germany
- Branch: German Army
- Service years: 1914–1945
- Rank: Generalleutnant
- Commands: I Army Corps
- Conflicts: World War I; World War II; Courland Pocket
- Awards: Knight's Cross of the Iron Cross

Christian Usinger (21 August 1894 – 2 April 1949) was a German general during World War II who commanded the I Army Corps. He was a recipient of the Knight's Cross of the Iron Cross of Nazi Germany. Usinger surrendered to the Soviet Forces in 1945 in the Courland Pocket. He died in a POW camp in the Soviet Union in early 1949.

== Awards and decorations ==
- German Cross in Gold on 19 September 1942 as Oberst in Arko 110
- Knight's Cross of the Iron Cross on 9 June 1944 as Generalmajor and leader of the 81. Infanterie-Division

Military offices
Preceded by General der Infanterie Friedrich Fangohr	Commander of I. Armeekorps; 21 April 1945 - 8 May 1945	Succeeded by German Capitulation
