= LIV Army Corps =

LIV Army Corps (54th Army Corps)
- German: LIV. Armeekorps
- Active: 1 June 1941–2 February 1944
- Country: Germany
- Branch: Army
- Size: Corps
- Nickname: "Gruppe Hilpert" (early 1943)
- Engagements: Unternehmen Barbarossa; Battle of the Sea of Azov; Crimean campaign Siege of Sevastopol; Siege of Leningrad; Leningrad-Novgorod Offensive

Commanders
- Notable commanders: Erick-Oskar Hansen; Carl Hilpert; Otto Sponheimer

The LIV Army Corps (German: LIV. Armeekorps) was a Wehrmacht army corps during World War II. It was formed in June 1941. After February 1944, it was upgraded to a command equivalent in rank but not in name to an army, something that the Wehrmacht dubbed an army detachment. It operated under the following names:

- Under its initial name LIV Army Corps, it was active between June 1941 and February 1944.
- It was renamed Army Detachment Narva (German: Armeeabteilung Narwa) on 2 February 1944.
- It was again renamed and became Army Detachment Grasser (German: Armeeabteilung Grasser) on 25 September 1944.
- It was redesignated again in October 1944, becoming Army Detachment Kleffel (German: Armeeabteilung Kleffel).

The officer staff of Army Detachment Kleffel was dissolved and its personnel used to form a full-fledge army-level command, the 25th Army, on 10 November 1944.

== History ==
=== LIV Army Corps, June 1941 – February 1944 ===
==== Formation ====
The LIV Army Corps was formed on 1 June 1941 as a reserve staff under supervision of the DHM (German: Deutsche Heeresmission), the German military mission in Romania. Its creation had been ordered on 4 April 1941.

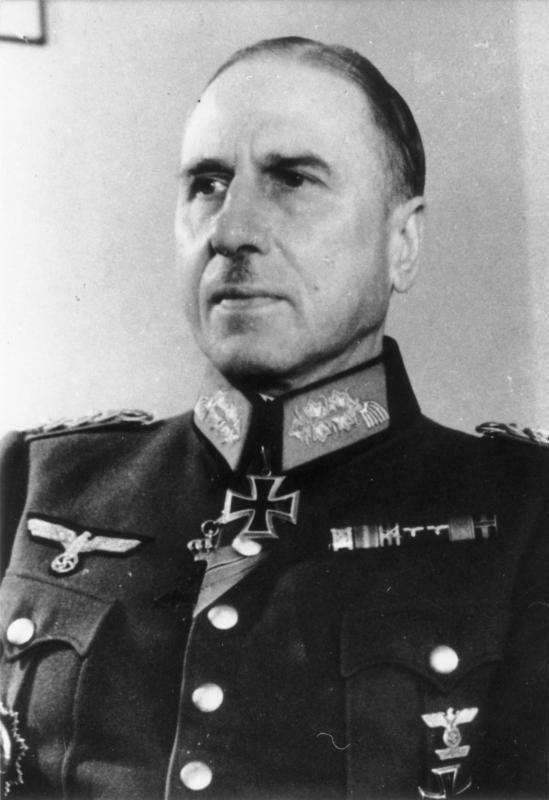
Erick Hansen, corps commander of the LIV Army Corps between 1941 and 1943.

The initial commander of LIV Army Corps was Erick Hansen, who would hold that office until 20 January 1943. The German DHM in Romania was one of two army deployments by Germany that were initially intended for noncombat circumstances, next to the German military mission in Finland. Hansen was previously the head of the DHM, but had only little faith in Germany's Romanian allies. Hansen described the Romanian units as 'useless for difficult offensive actions'. The creation of LIV Army Corps was part of the immediate preparation for the Axis invasion of the Soviet Union, Unternehmen Barbarossa. Romania, under the leadership of Ion Antonescu, had agreed to take part in the invasion. Romania would provide four divisions and six brigades to the initial invasion force, with another nine divisions and two brigades in reserve. Furthermore, the Romanian government allowed German units like the LIV Army Corps to operate from Romanian territory.

The LIV Army Corps was part of 11th Army (von Schobert), which was in turn a part of Army Group South under Gerd von Rundstedt, who had already led Army Group South during the Invasion of Poland. The initial divisions of the LIV Army Corps were the 50th Infantry Division and the 170th Infantry Division.

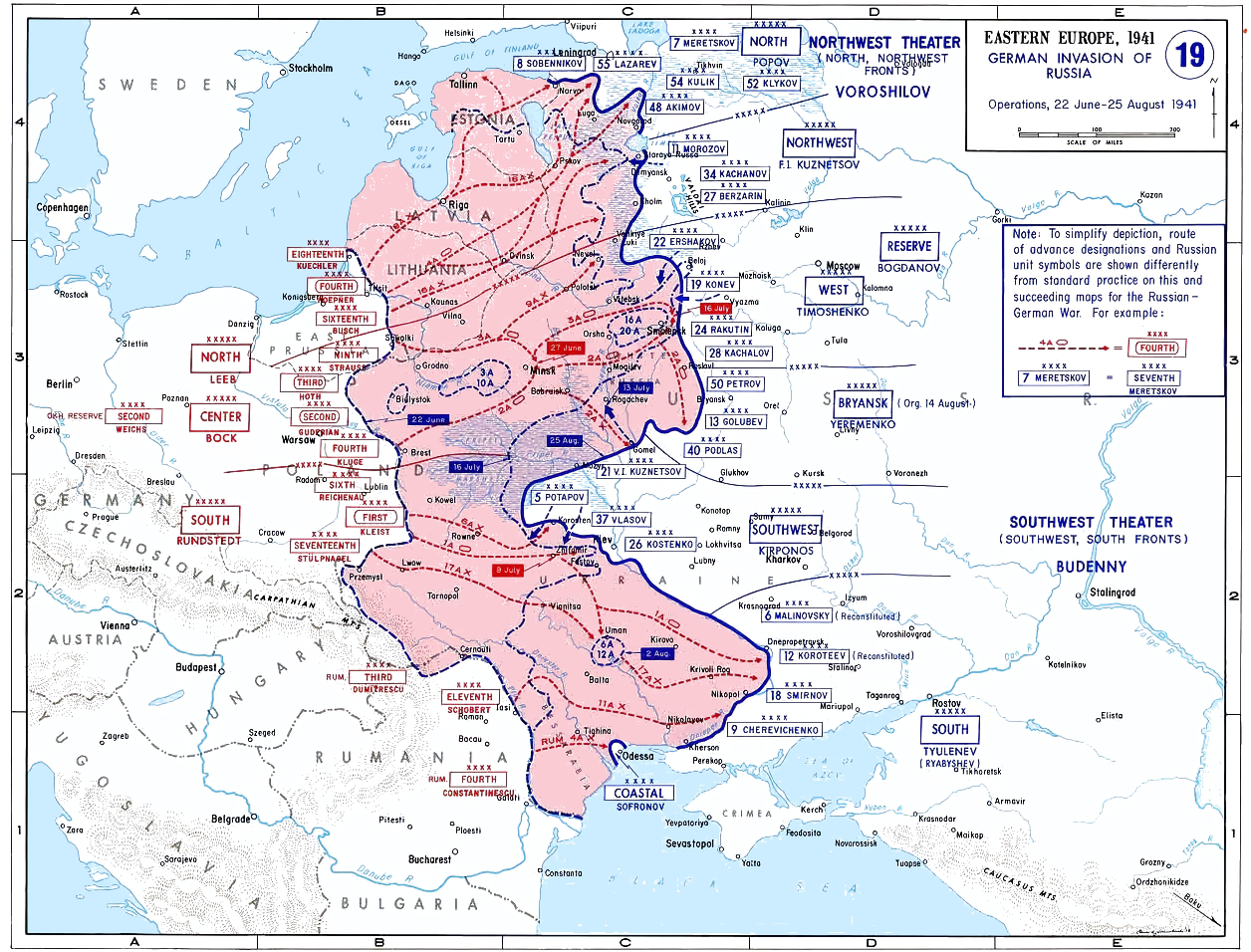
The plan of the German invasion of the Soviet Union, Operation Barbarossa. The 11th Army, which the LIV Army Corps was part of, is second from the bottom.

==== June–September 1941 ====
It was the task of Army Group South to advance eastward from occupied Poland and northeastward from northern Romania into the Ukrainian SSR. In Ukraine, Kiev was the first major operational target for the Germans, whereas the Romanians would be instructed to attack Odessa. In the opening stages of the invasion, the 11th Army, which the LIV Army Corps was a part of, made up a critical part of one of Rundstedt's shock groups. Schobert's 11th Army was to cooperate with the Third and Fourth Romanian Armies to conduct a delayed supporting attack from Romania into the Soviet Union. The objective of these three armies was to clear Red Army forces from southern Ukraine, to secure the Black Sea coast and to, if possible, encircle Soviet forces in the Kamianets-Podilskyi and Vinnytsia areas. Other German armies under Rundstedt's supervision included the 6th Army (von Reichenau) and 17th Army (von Stülpnagel).

The shock group struck the Soviet defenses in Moldavia on 2 July. A week earlier, on 25 June, the Stavka had formed a new command, the Southern Front, in the sectors opposite the 11th Army. The Southern Front (Tyulenev) consisted of the Soviet 9th Army (Cherevichenko) and the Soviet 18th Army (Smirnov). It had been Rundstedt's plan to use the German 11th Army to encircle these and other forces in southern Ukraine in cooperation with the German 17th Army. On the first day of action, the 11th Army overwhelmed the Soviet defenders and reached the Prut river. The Soviet forces, overestimating the strength of the German attack, promptly fell back to the Dniester river line before realizing their mistake. In the resulting Soviet counterattack, the line stabilized between the Prut and Dniester rivers. The Soviet 18th Army was forced to dig in in the Mohyliv-Podilskyi area.

On 18 July 1941, the 11th Army crossed the Dniester at Mohyliv-Podilskyi. This resulted in a realization at Stavka that the Southern Front and Southwestern Front were threatened by envelopment. Stavka allowed the Soviet 6th, 12th and 18th Armies to withdraw towards the Bila Tserkva line, some 100 kilometers west of the Dnieper river. At the end of August, the LIV Army Corps reached the Dnieper opposite Nikopol with the 11th Army and was now geographically halfway between Kiev in the north and Crimea in the south.

On 26 August 1941, commanding general of LIV Army Corps Hansen sent an estimation of the attached Romanian units to the command of 11th Army. Among other examples, he applauded the quality of Romanian anti-tank guns, but surmised that the fact the anti-tank detachments were horse-drawn detracted from their performance.

On 12 September, Eugen Ritter von Schobert was killed in action while performing his duties as commander of 11th Army. He was killed when his Fieseler Fi 156 plane attempted to land on ground that happened to contain a freshly deployed Soviet minefield.

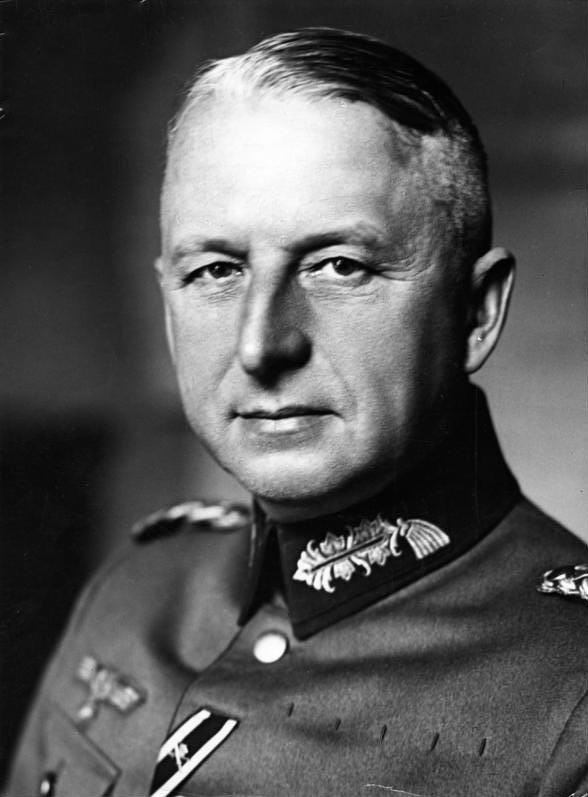
Erich von Manstein, commander of the 11th Army between September 1941 and November 1942.

He was subsequently replaced by Erich von Manstein, who as the new commander of the 11th Army now also oversaw the activities of LIV Army Corps. Manstein arrived at his new headquarters in Mykolaiv on the mouth of the Bug river on 17 September 1941. Under Manstein's supervision, the 11th Army broke through the Red Army defenses at the Isthmus of Perekop starting on 24 September 1941. In this assault, the LIV Army Corps served as the main assault force against the Perekop position and were supported by German artillery formations as well as by aerial units of Luftflotte 4. According to the plan, the LIV Army Corps was to achieve the initial breakthrough, with the XXXXIX Mountain Corps as well as the 1st SS Panzer Division Leibstandarte SS Adolf Hitler standing by to rush through the breach. The Romanian Third Army (Dumitrescu) was on defensive duty on the Ukrainian mainland to plug holes left open by German troops moving into Crimea. At this point, with Bessarabia reclaimed, the Romanians were politically and militarily careful to overcommit to the Ukrainian campaigns now that their principal war aim was fulfilled. Regardless, Manstein would later note in his memoirs that Dumitrescu's personal loyalty had greatly enhanced the joint German-Romanian cause in southern Ukraine.

The attack on Perekop that started on 24 September 1941 was not perfectly smooth, however. With the 73rd Infantry Division on the right and the 46th Infantry Division on the left, LIV Army Corps advanced into Soviet defenses in almost completely flat terrain. Although the LIV Army Corps enjoyed strong artillery and air support, the Soviet defenses were still in a decent position and reasonably well-constructed, including a remarkable trench and tunnel system that connected the towns of Perekop and Preobrazhenka and through which Soviet infantry and supplies could move underground. Furthermore, there was a trench on the neck of the isthmus, dubbed the Tartar Wall by the German attackers (after the common European name for the inner city walls of Beijing). This trench, some ten to fifteen meters deep, was the main line of Soviet defense and was held by the Soviet 156th, 271st and 276th Rifle Divisions.

In response, German engineers advanced under the cover of smoke and employed demolition charges and hand grenades against the trenches and bunkers. Losses among the German engineers were high. The German advance across the Tartar Wall and past the defenders north of Armyansk took three days. By then, the Stuka attacks by Luftflotte 4 had taken a significant toll on the number and morale of the Soviet defenders. After the Germans dislodged the defenders from Armyansk, the Tartar Wall was broken; a counterattack by the Soviet 5th Tank Regiment was successful in breaching the German lines, crossing the Tartar Wall and reaching the rear of Germany's 73rd Infantry Division, but this counterattack was fought back using artillery attacks and air strikes. The Soviet armored formation was not enough to reclaim the Tartar Wall line. With the Tartar Wall secure, the Germans had crossed the isthmus, but were now in no position to actually penetrate the breach they opened. The 1st SS Panzer Division, which Manstein initially had intended to be used for this penetration, was now called back to stand by for orders from 1st Panzer Group (von Kleist) that was preparing to attack towards Rostov-on-Don. Furthermore, the losses sustained by the 46th and 73rd Infantry Divisions were substantial.

The situation was further complicated by a counter attack by units of the Soviet Southern Front that struck against the units of the 11th Army from a position between the Dniepr and the Sea of Azov. The 9th, 12th and 18th Soviet Armies started an offensive against the Germans on 26 September 1941, starting the Battle of the Sea of Azov. This offensive scored considerable initial successes and threatened to penetrate the Axis line at several points. Although Manstein would in his memoirs blame this setback on the Third Romanian Army and specifically the 4th Mountain Brigade, the forces of both Romania and Germany were heavily affected by the Soviet push.

To stabilize the situation, the XXXXIX Mountain Corps, which had been the other force besides the 1st SS Panzer Division intended by Manstein to lead the attack against Crimea itself, had to turn around halfway to Perekop and to face the advancing Soviet forces. The Axis forces, now supported by units of Kleist's Panzer Group, were able to surround the overextended Soviet formation and to eventually capture most of the Soviet 9th and 18th Armies. The Soviet 12th Army managed to escape the trap, but the Axis were nonetheless able to make more than 65,000 prisoners. The LIV Army Corps was not part of this victorious effort against the Soviet 9th, 12th and 18th Armies; it still stood on the Perekop isthmus, unable to capitalize on the gains made by the 46th and 73rd Infantry Divisions due to the high casualties the corps had sustained.

After the close call at the Sea of Azov, it was now clear that the previously ambivalent command direction of the 11th Army, which had been essentially required to push both east towards Rostov and south towards Sevastopol was unacceptable. Manstein's 11th Army was now unequivocally instructed to commit to an attack across Crimea towards Sevastopol, whereas Rostov was to be left to Kleist's Panzer Group. The 11th Army was also assigned additional reinforcements in the form of the XXX Army Corps and the XXXXII Army Corps. The LIV Army Corps specifically was expanded by adding the 50th Infantry Division.

==== October–December 1941 ====
The 50th Infantry Division first appears as part of the LIV Army Corps on the Wehrmacht order of battle on 2 October 1941. In addition to the German reinforcements, the Romanians also strengthened their troops in the area by dispatching the Romanian Mountain Corps, consisting of the 1st Mountain Brigade, 8th Cavalry Brigade and 19th Artillery Regiment. The need to wait for the arrival of these reinforcements delayed the renewed attempt to attack Crimea well into October 1941.

Newly strengthened with the arrival of additional German and Romanian troops, the 11th Army began the Crimean campaign on 18 October 1941. This resulted in an order by Stavka for the Soviet Black Sea Fleet to evacuate the garrison that defended Odessa and for that evacuated garrison to join the defense of the Crimean peninsula. The objective of the operation was the elimination of Sevastopol, the main port of the Soviet Black Sea Fleet which had proven to be of considerable value to the Soviet forces, specifically during the Siege of Odessa. Another target on the Crimea was the access to the Kerch Peninsula, which would grant the Axis another access point to the Caucasus region.

The beginning of the campaign was carried by three German infantry divisions advancing in a line. Two of these, the 46th and the 73rd, were part of LIV Army Corps and had already done the heavy lifting during the attack on Perekop. The third division in question was the 22nd Infantry Division of XXX Army Corps. With the rest of the 11th Army forces waiting in the rear, the German attackers engaged some eight Soviet divisions that were supported by four cavalry brigades as well as significant Red Air Force contingents. Soviet airpower made the first few days of the Crimean campaign very painful to the German spearhead and caused the German infantry to regularly dig trenches and foxholes to find cover from Soviet aerial strafe runs.

While Luftwaffe forces of Fliegerkorps IV were present, the Wehrmacht units could not operate with the air superiority that they had been accustomed to during most of Operation Barbarossa. The German losses mounted quickly, and especially officers were hard to replace. Within a few days, several battalions were commanded by lieutenant-rank soldiers as their captains were killed. However, Soviet losses were certainly comparable, and the German spearhead, covered by artillery fire, made progress. The Germans proved the experience they had with infantry attacks under artillery cover from previous campaigns, whereas the Soviet defenders were less effective at utilizing their own guns.

By 25 October 1941, the German offensive momentum was all but spent, but the Soviet resistance had notably weakened. The twelve divisions of the Soviet 51st Army had already been thrown against the Germans and the Soviet reserves were running dry. The Germans broke the Soviet defensive line in front of Ishun, just south of Krasnoperekopsk, on 28 October 1941. Manstein had kept all other troops in reserve during the breakthrough of the three infantry divisions in front, and was now able to send everything he had through the breach created by the spearhead. On the German left stood the XXXXII Corps with its rested 170th Infantry Division as well as the 46th and 73rd Infantry Divisions that had been previously part of LIV Army Corps. The XXXXII Corps marched east. In the German center, the XXX Army Corps stood ready with the 22nd Infantry Division as well as the rested 72nd Infantry Division, poised to advance straight towards the Yaila Mountains. On the German right, LIV Army Corps itself stood, with the newly arrived 50th and 132nd Infantry Divisions. Its main goal was Sevastopol in the southwest of Crimea.

The German advance was swift. On 1 November, Simferopol was taken by a single anti-tank battalion. On 4 November, Feodosia in the southeast was taken. The Crimean campaign lasted until 16 November 1941 when Kerch was captured. marking the German conquest of the entire peninsula with the exception of Sevastopol, which the Germans had started to besiege on 30 October.

The capture of Crimea by the LIV Army Corps and the 11th Army brought with it the mass murder of the local Jewish population. Between 9 December and 13 December 1941, some 12,000 Jews were murdered outside Simferopol. Many of them had been denounced by their non-Jewish compatriots, whereas others were hunted down and executed by SS forces aided by Wehrmacht units.

Although Manstein had called to carry the momentum straight into a penetration of Sevastopol's defenses, rains and poor road condition slowed LIV Army Corps so much that its infantry contingents could not keep up with the mobile advance detachments. These detachments proved too weak to take Sevastopol's forward defenses on their own, and the Soviet defenders gained enough time to dig in. LIV Army Corps was halted by the Soviet defenders by 8 November 1941 at a line some six miles north and east of the city. Both sides started to reinforce. The Germans brought in their supplies over land, whereas the Soviets used the Black Sea Fleet, just like they had done at Odessa. The LIV Army Corps was soon joined by XXX Army Corps from eastern Crimea, whereas the city's defenders were strengthened by detachments from Odessa and the Caucasus. As the siege entered the next phase, the Soviet defenders numbered some 52,000 soldiers and 170 guns, with more on the way. This defense force, headed by Ivan Petrov, was dubbed the Independent Coastal Army.

The German failure to take the city with the momentum of the October advance doomed the chances to take Sevastopol before the end of the year. The winter 1941/42 came early, and brought with it heavy rain and snowfall, as well as cold temperatures. Furthermore, the strategic situation changed for the worse, with German defeats at the Battle of Rostov by 2 December, the first major German defeat during Operation Barbarossa, as well as the Battle of Moscow by the end of the year. Kleist responded to the setback at Rostov by retreating his Panzer Group thirty-five miles to the west and entrenching behind the Mius river. This move was approved by Rundstedt, but irritated Germany's dictator Adolf Hitler, and Rundstedt was subsequently sacked. The heavily bolstered Soviet forces in the Rostov sector reduced the priority of attacking Sevastopol, and the 73rd Infantry Division, previously with LIV Army Corps, was taken away from XXXXII Army Corps and sent to aid Kleist.

On 17 December 1941, Manstein's 11th Army attempted to breach the fortress at Sevastopol. LIV Corps attacked from the north, XXX Corps from the south. Robbed of the reserves that would have been provided by the 73rd Infantry Division that was called to assist the Rostov sector, the LIV Corps had only one battle-worthy division, the 22nd Infantry Division. Manstein would single out the bravery and excellence displayed by the forces of the 22nd Infantry Division during the December 1941 activities in his memoirs, but the attack was nonetheless very likely to fail. Additional units could also not be called up, as the forces of the XXXXII Corps were tied down guarding the area between Feodosia and Kerch.

Still, the success scored by the meager German infantry formations was remarkable. The 22nd Infantry Division managed to pierce two of the three defensive rings around Sevastopol. Just as the units of the 22nd Infantry Division had dispatched of the defenders from the 40th Cavalry Division and were about to decisively take the high ground that would grant them the key to victory over Sevastopol, the arrival of the 79th Independent Marine Brigade tipped the balance in the Soviet favor. Over the next few days, the arrival of the 345th Rifle Division from Tuapse in the Caucasus strengthened the Soviet position. The Soviets managed to snatch victory from the jaws of defeat, and the German attack against Sevastopol was repelled. A renewed attempt to take the fortress starting on 27 December was diluted by the Soviet landings on the Kerch peninsula.

In spite of the Soviet activity at the Kerch peninsula, Hitler insisted that the attack of Sevastopol should be continued, in the hopes of scoring a politically valuable victory to improve German military and civilian morale. However, the commanders in Crimea determined that the mounting Soviet threat made the continuation of the attack unfeasible. The attack on Sevastopol was halted on 31 December 1941.

On 26 December 1941, the Soviet forces used their naval supremacy provided by the Black Sea Fleet to make several landings on the Kerch peninsula. Elements of the Soviet 51st Army landed on both sides of Kerch. This started the Battle of the Kerch Peninsula. Two days later, a much larger Soviet force landed at Feodosia, bringing in troops of the Soviet 44th Army. By 29 December 1941, the Soviet Union had brought ashore 41,000 soldiers, 236 guns and 43 tanks.

==== 1942 ====
Over the course of January 1942, the Soviet force would be strengthened even further with the arrival of the 47th Army. The 44th, 47th and 51st Armies were officially fused into the newly formed Crimean Front by the order of Joseph Stalin on 28 January.

While organizationally impressive, the Soviet landings happened under awful conditions. The Soviet soldiers were faced with strong winds and temperatures around -20°C. Six of the ten Soviet landing sites were quickly recaptured by local German forces. Nonetheless, the sheer numerical force of the Red Army allowed the Soviet Union to recapture the Kerch Peninsula with the threat to regain control of Crimea as a whole. The arrival of three Soviet armies threw the local German commander, Hans von Sponeck of XXXXII Corps, into a panic. Sponeck requested the right to retreat three times, and was refused by Manstein every time. He eventually fell back to the west of peninsula on his own accord. As a result of this development, the attack on Sevastopol had to be postponed yet again, as Manstein called off XXX Corps towards the Kerch Peninsula, leaving LIV Corps on its own in front of the Soviet fortress. The Germans recaptured Feodosia, a valuable port from which reinforcements could have been brought in by the Black Sea Fleet, from the Soviets on 18 January.

The situation was now in a stalemate, as the Germans held the vast majority of the Crimean peninsula as well as the bottleneck that connected it to mainland Ukraine, but the two objectives that the Wehrmacht had invaded Crimea for in the first place, Sevastopol and Kerch, were in the hands of the Red Army. With the Kerch Strait frozen, the Soviet forces could simply walk towards the frontline in eastern Crimea from the Taman Peninsula in Russia. These reinforcements also included T-34 tanks. The high-ranking Soviet officers were however hindered in the execution of their duties by the presence of Lev Mekhlis, Stalin's personal political watchdog, whose intrusive behavior paired with his military incompetence was a factor of obstruction in the Soviet officers' proceedings.

The Soviet Union attacked the positions of the 11th Army in a large attack on 27 February. This Battle of the Parpach Narrows achieved little that was of use to the Soviet forces. Although the Germans suffered considerable casualties as a result of the sheer numerical force of Soviet troops advancing against them, the Soviets sustained intense losses and saw only a seven-mile bulge in the northern portion of the line as a reward.

With Mekhlis pressuring the Soviet commanders to produce results, the Red Army attacked again on 13 March, 26 March and 9 April. These additional attacks also failed.

The Soviet April 1942 offensive was particularly bleak, as the improving weather conditions strengthened the performance of the German artillery and thus further increased the death toll on the Soviet side. In total, the Crimean Front had suffered a casualty rate of 40%. The German XXX Corps and XXXXII Corps as well as the Romanian Third Army held their positions and stood firm against the Soviet pressure. Despite Manstein's claims in his memoirs, the Romanian soldiers' bravery was not outmatched by that of their German counterparts. The performance of German aerial units was aided by the bolstering of air units and by the tightly-packed Soviet ground formations. Still, the German performance was not flawless. Manstein wasted much of the newly arrived 22nd Panzer Division by sending it into combat without much preparation on 20 March.

The Battle of the Kerch Peninsula ended in an overwhelming Axis victory on 19 May.

In June 1942, with the Kerch Peninsula defended, a newly strengthened 11th Army could once again tackle the task of dislodging the Soviet defenders at Sevastopol. The bombardment of the city was reopened with renewed force on 2 June 1942. The Luftwaffe's Fliegerkorps VIII, armed with over 600 ground support aircraft, supported the efforts. On a front of just twenty-one miles, the Germans commanded 611 artillery pieces, resulting in the greatest concentration of fire yet achieved by the German Wehrmacht during World War II, at 29 guns per mile of frontline. In the subsequent bombardment of the city, Sevastopol's defenses were shattered under the constant artillery fire. The German artillery was crowned by the "big three", two 600mm guns as well a Schwerer Gustav-type railway gun firing 800mm shells, making it the largest rifled weapon ever used in combat.

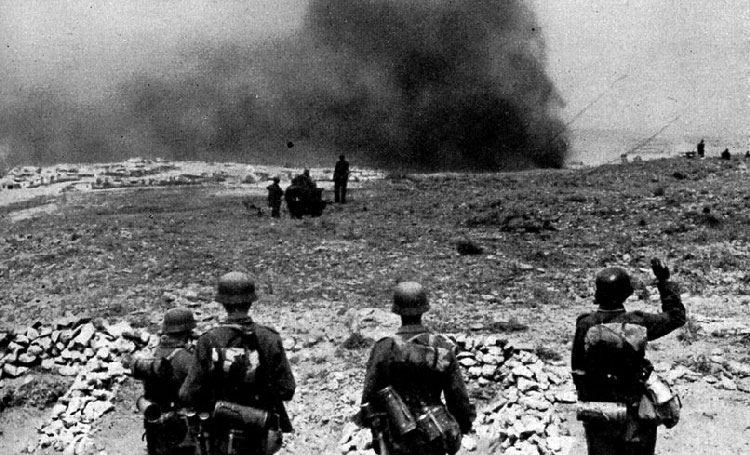
German 11th Army soldiers approach Sevastopol in June 1942.

The ground attack was, just like in December 1941, carried out by LIV Army Corps from the north and XXX Army Corps from the southeast. Between them, the Romanian Mountain Corps provided support. The ground attack began on the morning of 7 June 1942. Unlike in December 1941, the Germans were now equipped with all the ground, artillery and aerial forces necessary to penetrate the Soviet defense lines, and the LIV Corps made its way forward against tenacious Soviet resistance. By 13 June, forward elements of the 22nd Infantry Division reached the north shore of the bay, clearing out Fort Stalin, the fortification against which the attack of December 1941 had failed. To the right of the 22nd Division, the 24th and 132nd Infantry Divisions, would clean the entire shore. Meanwhile in the south, XXX Corps had successfully reached the Zapun heights, thus breaching the second of the three defense lines of Sevastopol. Subsequently, the innermost of Sevastopol's defenses had to be tackled. On 17 June, the LIV Army Corps decisively captured six fortifications on the northern front.

Just after midnight in the early hours of 29 June 1942, elements of the 50th Infantry Division under LIV Corps carried out an amphibious crossing of Severnaya Bay on assault boats. By daybreak, the 50th Infantry Division had successfully breached the Zapun position and over the course of the day overran the Inkerman Ridge as well as the Malakov bastion. The decisive breakthrough was achieved by the 170th Infantry Division. In response to this decisive blow, Stalin ordered to evacuate the city on 30 June. Some 30,000 Soviet troops awaited evacuation by the Black Sea Fleet on the Chersonese Peninsula, but were captured by the Germans before the promised ships arrived. Another 60,000 prisoners were taken in Sevastopol itself.

The German 11th Army formally entered Sevastopol on 1 July 1942. Manstein was promoted to Generalfeldmarschall by Hitler's order that evening as a reward for the victory. The last elements of resistance were eliminated on 4 July 1942, bringing the Siege of Sevastopol to an end. The LIV Army Corps was transferred to 18th Army (Lindemann) in September 1942, then briefly transferred back to the 11th Army in October 1942.

LIV Army Corps was permanently transferred to the 18th Army in November 1942. At the time of transfer, the LIV Army Corps only commanded the 250th "Blue" Infantry Division, made up of Spanish Wehrmacht volunteers. The LIV Army Corps joined the Siege of Leningrad.

==== 1943 ====
On 1 January 1943, the German forces engaged at the Siege of Leningrad included the 16th Army and LIV Army Corps' 18th Army. The 16th Army consisted of the X Army Corps, II Army Corps, and the Groups Hahne and Tiemann. The 18th Army was made up, next to the LIV Army Corps, of the L Army Corps, XXVI Army Corps, I Army Corps, XXVIII Army Corps and XXXVIII Army Corps, as well as several divisions in reserve.

Erick-Oskar Hansen was succeeded as corps commander of LIV Army Corps by Carl Hilpert on 20 January 1943. Hilpert would hold the office for seven months, until 1 August 1943. Hilpert had previously served as the commander of XXIII Army Corps, chief of staff of Army Group B and chief of staff of 1st Army.

On 1 August 1943, Carl Hilpert was succeeded as corps commander of LIV Army Corps by Otto Sponheimer. Sponheimer would hold this office until after the formal reassignment of LIV Army Corps as an army detachment in February 1944.

==== 1944 ====
Starting on 14 January 1944, the LIV Army Corps was part of the withdrawal of Army Group North from Leningrad to the Panther Line. Army Group North had been decisively weakened by Soviet attacks as well as troop transfers away from the northern sectors to other parts of the Eastern Front. Between July 1943 and January 1944, it lost two fifths of its troops, or 18 divisions, to other sectors. Additionally, it had also been burdened with additional pieces of frontline like the Polotsk sector, which was transferred to Army Group North on 10 January 1944. As a result, the order had been given on 14 January to fall back to the Panther Line, ending the Siege of Leningrad after more than 900 days. The Soviet Union subsequently attacked with its Leningrad–Novgorod Offensive and threw some 1.2 million soldiers and 1,580 tanks, supported by 1,386 aircraft and 43,000 partisans behind the German lines, against some 397,000 German soldiers (including those on anti-partisan duty).

=== Army Detachment Narva, February 1944 – September 1944 ===
==== February – April ====
Armeeabteilung Narwa
- Active: 2 February 1944–25 September 1944
- Country: Germany
- Branch: Army
- Size: Armeeabteilung (de facto equivalent in rank to a field army)
- Nickname: "Group Sponheimer" (2 February - 23 February 1944)

Commanders
- Notable commanders: Johannes Frießner

On 2 February 1944, Walter Model, commander of Army Group North between 9 January and 31 March, visited the positions in the Narva region. On this occasion, Model upgraded the LIV Army Corps and bestowed the command of all forces along the Narva river onto Sponheimer in a unit directly subordinate to Army Group North and thus equal in rank to an army.

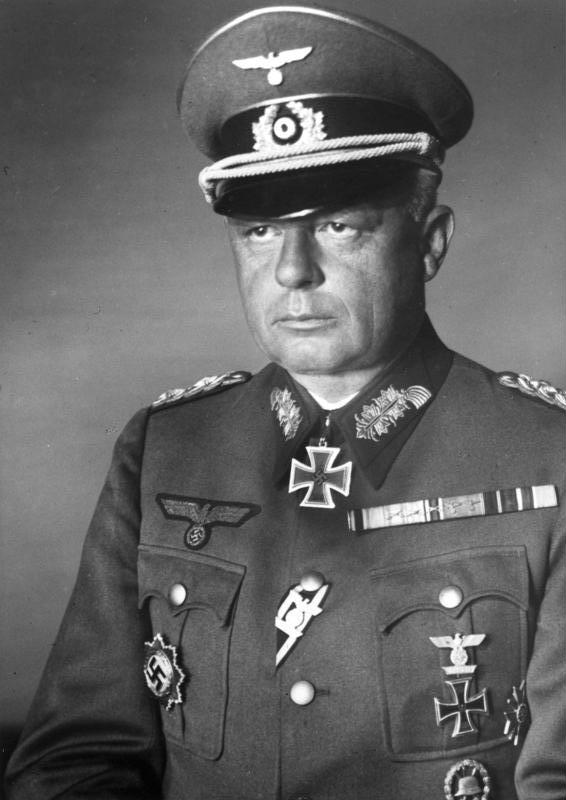
Johannes Frießner, commander of Army Detachment Narwa starting on 23 February 1944.

This unit, initially dubbed Group Sponheimer, was formally named Army Detachment Narva on 23 February, when Sponheimer was relieved of command and replaced with Johannes Frießner. Army Detachment Narva was fed additional reinforcements until the end of February to strengthen it against the imminent Soviet attacks. Among the new units was the Panzergrenadier Division Feldherrnhalle.

In the meantime, the Red Army was also bolstering its forces. The 43rd Rifle Corps sent additional forces across the Narva river, but was after initial gains repelled by units of the 227th Infantry Division and the 23rd (Dutch) SS Division. On 12 February, the 90th Rifle Division attacked across Lake Peipus and seized the island of Piirissaar in the hopes of establishing an outpost with which the Red Army could outflank the Germans in the south. The position was immediately counter-attacked by German forces and Estonian militia and retaken.

The Red Banner Fleet attempted to outflank the German positions in the north by amphibiously deploying two Soviet infantry brigades on 13 February, but happened to drop their forces directly in front of the Panther Line's artillery fortifications. Nonetheless, the Soviet forces managed to reach and surround Meriküla and the units of Kampfgruppe Berlin within it. The Germans, supported by Tiger tanks of the 502nd Heavy Panzer Battalion, dislodged the Soviet siege ring the following day and restored contact to the forces trapped in the village. The landing operation left behind the corpses of many killed or drowned Red Army soldiers on the shore.

In the meantime, the Red Army also reinforced the bridgehead at Krivasoo, where the 109th Rifle Corps joined the 122nd Rifle Corps. The Soviet units headed north towards Narva in the hope to envelop the city, but their advance was repelled by the 11th (Scandinavian) SS Division, 170th Infantry Division and the newly arrived Feldhernhalle Division. Further southwest, the Soviet 30th Guards Rifle Corps managed to advance against Auvere and secure the town's railway station before falling under attack by Feldhernhalle units on 17 February.

The Soviet leadership grew increasingly frustrated at the inability of the Soviet forces to break the well-entrenched German positions. On 14 February, Stavka sent an order to seize the city of Narva no later than 17 February, both for "military as well as political reasons", declaring it to be "the most important thing right now". The southern Soviet bridgehead was subsequently strengthened with reinforcements from the 124th Rifle Corps as well as a small unit of tanks. However, the Soviet attacks continued to be repelled even with these additional forces. The 124th Rifle Corps was repelled by Feldhernhalle, supported by the 502nd Tank Battalion and the 61st Infantry Division. While the Soviet units were unable to break the German defenders, the Germans in turn were also unable to succeed in the plan of their supreme commander Model, who had intended to fight east of the Narva Valley. The Soviet attackers continued to advance towards and via Luga (which was as a result abandoned by the Germans on 12 February) and the forces that Model had intended for an enveloping maneuver, including the 126th Infantry Division, 12th Panzer Division and 12th Luftwaffe Field Division, were pinned down east of Lake Peipus by the Soviet 42nd Army.

The Germans that were still east of the Panther Line continued their retreat towards it, and the Soviet 8th Army, which had been overzealous on the attack, was temporarily enveloped by German defenders. As a result, forces from the Volkhov Front had to be diverted to save the 8th Army, and Lindemann's 18th Army (formerly also the home of the LIV Army Corps) had precious time to continue its retreat. 18th Army's retreat exposed the northern flank of the 16th Army, which was threatened by the Soviet 22nd Army and 10th Guards Army. Further south, the Soviet cancellation of fruitless attacks against Vitebsk, defended by the 3rd Panzer Army, freed up forces to turn north and also threaten the 16th Army. Subsequently, the 16th Army disengaged from the enemy, and managed to withdraw safely west before drawing Soviet attention to its retreat. On the Narva line, the newly formed 20th (Estonian) SS Division had joined the line to fill the gaps left by the destruction of the 9th and 10th Luftwaffe Field Divisions.

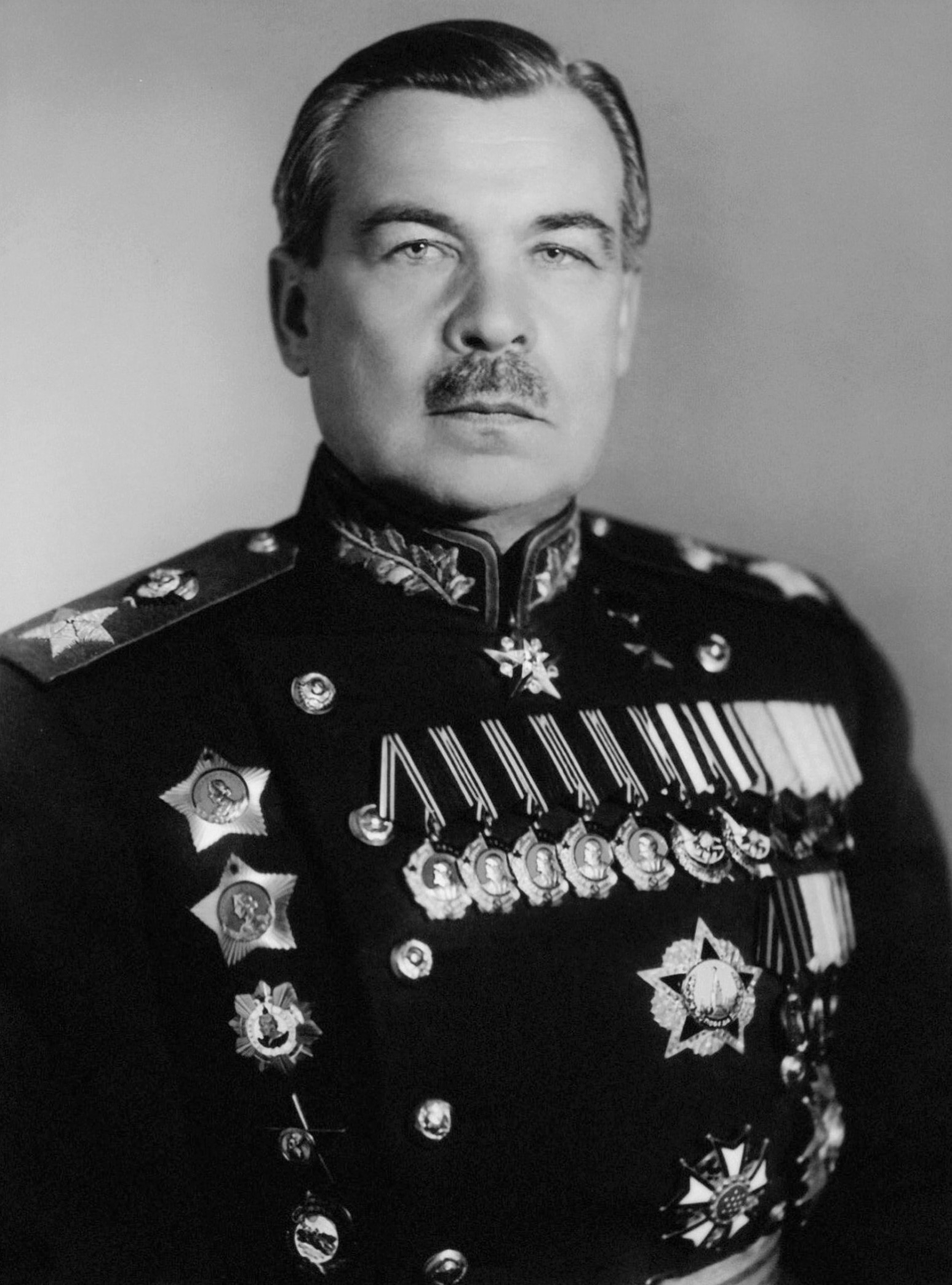
Leonid Govorov, commander of the Soviet Leningrad Front from June 1942 to July 1945.

On 20 February, the 20th SS Division attacked and managed to split the Soviet bridgehead in two parts. The Germans immediately attempted to close the small pocket that had been created at Riigiküla and attacked the area on 21 February. This attack was repelled by Soviet artillery support from the other side of the river. After further preparations, the Germans attacked the encircled Soviet troops again on 24 February and managed to close the distance to a degree that made it impossible for the Soviet artillery to continue its fire support. By the end of the day, the pocket was destroyed. On 22 February, the Soviet commander of the Leningrad Front, Leonid Govorov, issued new instructions to the Soviet forces in the Narva area. The main effort was to be placed on expanding the bridgehead south of Narva, from where the 2nd Shock Army (Fedyuninsky) was to strike northeast towards the city itself. In the meantime, the 59th Army would advance west. On the 59th Army's southern flank, the 8th Army should then strike into central Estonia. The other part of the bridgehead, north of Narva, was larger and contained large parts of the Soviet 378th Rifle Division as well as 20 assault guns. On 29 February, the two regiments of the 20th Estonian SS Division attacked the positions of the 378th Rifle Division. In this initial attack, the Estonian SS troops took massive casualties and lost many of their officers.

The resistance of the Soviet pocket north of Narva continued until 6 March, when it was at last eliminated. Harald Nugiseks, Unterscharführer of the SS-Waffen-Grenadier-Regiment 46 who had taken command after the regiment was killed, was awarded the Knight's Cross for his service during this time. On 1 March, the Soviet forces began the assault that Govorov had instructed them to carry out on 22 February. Fedyuninsky's 2nd Shock Army made very little progress, but the 59th Army scored initial successes against the 214th Infantry Division, a formation that had spent most of the war in occupation duty in Norway and that only recently had arrived on the scene. However, elements of the 11th and 58th Infantry Divisions came to the aid of the 214th over the next three days, and the Soviet advance was halted. While the Soviets had encircled some elements of the 214th, a counterattack by the 11th was successful in rescuing most of these German units. On 18 March, the Soviet forces once again attacked the German defenses. Elements of the 109th Rifle Corps and the 30th Guards Rifle Corps, the latter already heavily battered, attacked towards the railway line between Narva and Tallinn. Initially, the Soviet thrust was successful, and the Soviet formations successfully reached and cut off the railway line. One of the more notable individuals fighting on the German side in these battles was Otto Carius. On 26 March, the 11th and 227th Infantry Divisions attacked the Soviet lines in the hopes of beating them back and once more securing the rail line. The Soviet advanced position was divided into two areas. One of these Soviet outposts was to the west and the other to the east of the 502nd. The Germans first attempted to tackle the west sack. The tanks between the two Soviet posts were instructed to hold and defend while German infantry was to advance from the west and force the Soviets to retreat. Hyacinth Graf Strachwitz, a veteran tank commander known to his troops as the 'panzer count', led the assault in his Panzer IV. The attack was a success, and the west sack was eliminated.

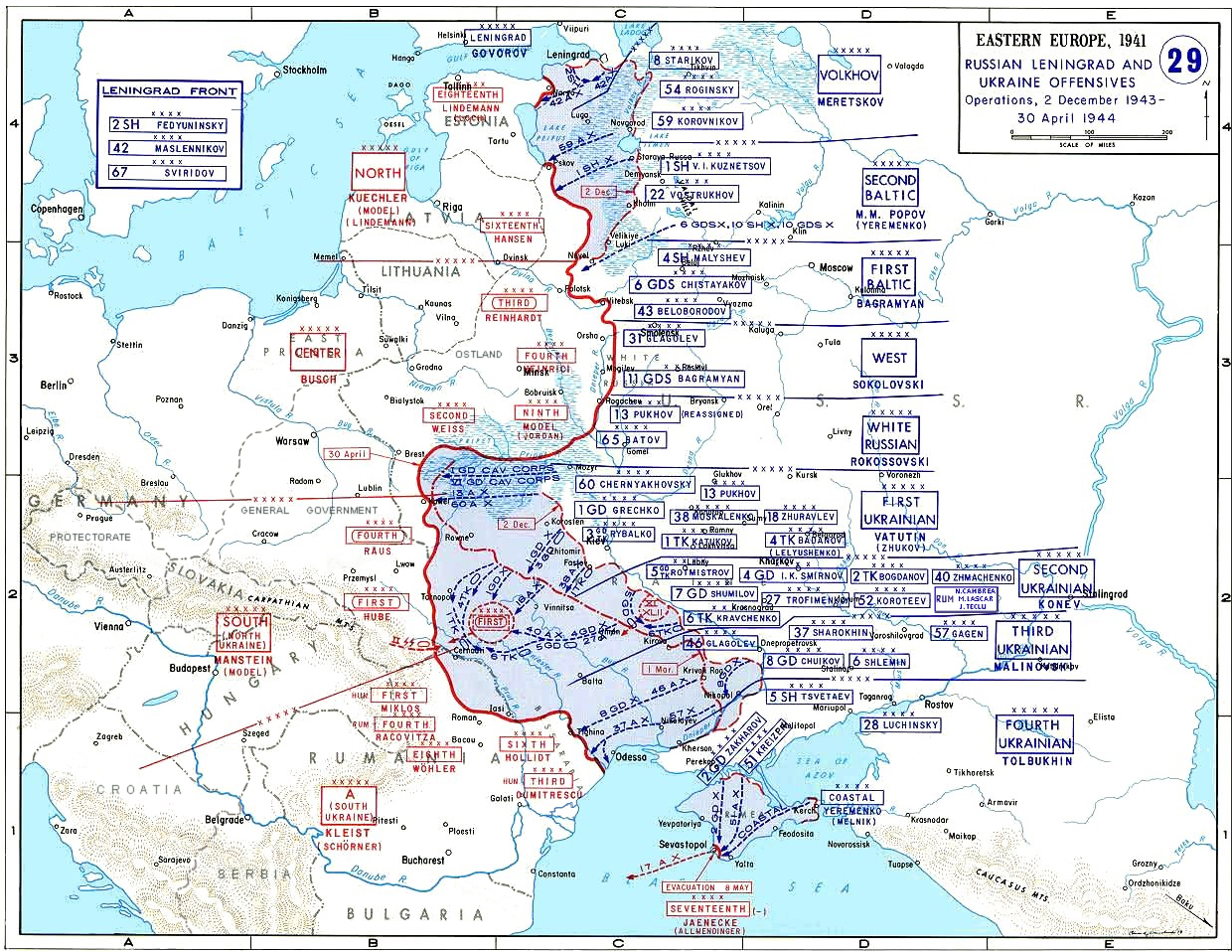
The Eastern Front of World War II during April 1944.

After the German victory at the west sack, the Soviet defenders in the east sack was attacked on 6 April. This time, Carius and the 502nd led the German attack. The Soviets were slow to respond to the heavy tank attacks with artillery countermeasures, and the Germans scored considerable successes against the units of the Soviet 109th Rifle Corps.

The Germans subsequently attempted to press the advantage and close the Soviet bridgehead permanently. On 19 April, the combined force of Strachwitz's forces, the 502nd, as well as units from the 61st, 122nd, 170th and Feldherrnhalle divisions were bulked up. In the chaos that ensued, the sides encircled one another several times and inflicted considerable casualties. The Soviets stood their ground, and the Germans called off the attack on 24 April. It was the end of winter fighting in the area, as the spring thaw set in.

==== May – July ====
On 10 July 1944, the Soviet 2nd Baltic Front attacked the left wing of the 16th Army in a thrust towards Rēzekne in Latvia. The following day, on 11 July, the 3rd Baltic Front, opened an offensive against the right wing of the 18th Army on the German northern flank. The operational objective of the 3rd Baltic Front was to achieve a breakthrough between Pskov and Ostrov and to cut off Army Detachment Narva, which was at the same time frontally attacked by the Leningrad Front.

Frießner, promoted to commander of Army Group North on 4 July, made open criticisms of Hitler's conduct of operations in a letter to the Führer on 12 July. Frießner attempted to convince Hitler to evacuate the northern Baltic, where he saw the German position as untenable. Frießner argued that the two tasks of Army Group North, to hold the existing front and at the same time make attacks to restore contact to Army Group Centre after the Soviet breakthrough as part of Operation Bagration that had started in June, were mutually exclusive. In Frießner's view, the army group would be unable to free enough forces to attack towards Army Group Centre without at the same time compromising its defensive task. Frießner suggested to withdraw the 16th and 18th Armies behind a line from Riga to Kaunas and to evacuate Army Detachment Narva, which would not be able to withdraw safely along the other northern forces, by sea from Tallinn. Frießner stressed that this operational plan was the only remaining way to save the army group from destruction.

In response to his letter, Frießner was summoned to the Führer headquarters on 14 July, with Model, now commander of Army Group Centre, in attendance. During this meeting, as well as another one on 18 July, both commanders stressed the emergency of their respective army groups. Hitler was initially adamant that the Baltic had to be held, but ultimately agreed to withdraw to the Latvia line as the 2nd and 3rd Baltic Fronts broke through the positions between the 16th and 18th Armies. In the meantime, the hole between Army Group North and Army Group Centre also grew larger and widened to 70 kilometers on 16 July. The Soviet forces aimed at Daugavpils in Latvia to push to the Baltic Sea and to cut off the entirety of Army Group North.

Pressured by the Soviet advance, Frießner demanded permission to withdraw to the Marienburg Line. In response, he was notified of his dismissal from command on 23 July. Nominally, this dismissal was an exchange of command with Ferdinand Schörner, as Schörner took Frießner's post at Army Group North and Frießner was in exchange assigned to Schörner's previous post at Army Group South Ukraine. Hitler, outraged by Frießner's criticisms of his command, intended Schörner to be a more loyal commander of Army Group North. However, the first major action that Schörner took was to order a withdrawal on 26 July. Army Group North was to evacuate from Daugavpils and move to the Marienburg Line.

==== August – September ====
On 6 August, Schörner repeated the suggestion of his predecessor Frießner and argued for the evacuation of Army Detachment Narva, still stuck in Estonia, from Tallinn. Hitler again refused, hoping that reinforcements could re-establish the connection of the German forces in Latvia to Army Detachment Narva. Schörner repeated his demand, this time in form of an ultimatum, in which he threatened to withdraw regardless of orders should he not receive support immediately. In response, Hitler ordered the rapid deployment of the 31st Infantry Division, using Junkers Ju 52 transport planes, to Army Group North. Hitler did this in spite of a fuel shortage.

In the meantime, the forces of Army Detachment Narva were seriously threatened by Soviet forces advancing via Võru. Only with significant effort did the German defenders manage to slow the Soviet advance with the use of a blocking position north of Tartu.

In early September 1944, the Soviet forces relaxed the pressure of their assaults for a time. Not only had Bagration ended against Army Group Centre, the attacks against Army Group North and Army Detachment Narva were also decreased in severity. A significant political change was brought about when, in preparation for the Moscow Armistice, the government of Finland announced its withdrawal from the alliance with Germany on 2 September 1944. The Finnish government was unwilling to carry on the Continuation War with German defeat evidently inevitable, and thus prepared to make peace with the Soviet Union and the Allied Powers. The effect of the Finnish withdrawal from the war was twofold: On the one hand, Estonia was no longer required as a German anchor to the Gulf of Finland, as this body of water had now lost its significance without a German-Finnish alliance. On the other hand, the Soviet forces in Karelia, no longer bound by Finnish troops, would now be free to swing south and crush the Baltic Wehrmacht positions.

On 5 September, Heinz Guderian, acting chief of staff of OKH, informed Army Group North that the evacuation of the Baltic area could not be avoided and would be needed very soon. Guderian specifically instructed the army group's leaders to make preparations for retreat in a camouflaged manner, likely to avoid detection by Hitler. On 6 September, Guderian specifically instructed Army Group North to prepare the evacuation of Estonia.

The evacuation of Estonia and northern Latvia, initially codenamed Königsberg, was subsequently dubbed Unternehmen Aster. This operation was started on the night of 18 to 19 September. German naval units evacuated a total of 108,825 persons by sea between 17 and 23 September. These persons could then be further subdivided into 46,168 soldiers in fighting condition, 13,049 wounded personnel, 26,131 civilians, and 23,474 prisoners of war. The remainders of Army Detachment Narva that had stayed behind on land were instructed to withdraw southwards to link up with the units of the 18th Army, which in turn was to pullback to the Segevold Line outside of Riga in Latvia.

Aster was brought to a close on the morning of 27 September.

Army Detachment Narva, with its staffs disbanded and the personnel reassigned, became Army Detachment Grasser on 25 September 1944.

=== Army Detachment Grasser, September/October 1944 ===
Named after its commander Anton Grasser, Army Detachment Grasser was formed from Army Detachment Narva on 25 September 1944. On 13 October 1944, it commanded the XXXVIII Army Corps, which consisted of the 32nd, 81st, 121st, 122nd, 201st and 329th Infantry Divisions, as well as the 21st Luftwaffe Field Division. Additionally, the 52nd Infantry Division was in the reserves of the army detachment. Before the end of October, Army Detachment Grasser became Army Detachment Kleffel.

=== Army Detachment Kleffel, October/November 1944 ===
Named after its commander Philipp Kleffel, Army Detachment Kleffel was formed from Army Detachment Grasser on 20 October 1944. The date of formation is not clear, but was after 13 October 1944. It existed for about a month before dissolution. The personnel was subsequently used to form the 25th Army.

=== Formation of the 25th Army, November 1944 ===
On 10 November 1944, Army Detachment Kleffel became the 25th Army.

== Noteworthy individuals ==
=== LIV Army Corps ===
- Erick-Oskar Hansen, corps commander from 1 June 1941 to 20 January 1943.
- Carl Hilpert, corps commander from 20 January 1943 to 1 August 1943.
- Otto Sponheimer, corps commander from 1 August 1943.

=== Army Detachment Narva / Grasser / Kleffel ===
- Wilhelm Berlin, commander of Armeeabteilung Narva from 13 February 1944 to 23 February 1944.
- Johannes Frießner, commander of Armeeabteilung Narva from 23 February 1944 to 4 July 1944.
- Anton Grasser, commander of Armeeabteilung Narva from 3 July 1944, then of renamed Armeeabteilung Grasser from 25 September 1944 to 20 October 1944.
- Philipp Kleffel, commander of Armeeabteilung Kleffel from 20 October 1944. Last commander of the army detachment before the formation of the 25th Army.
- Harald Nugiseks, Estonian soldier who served with distinction as part of the 20th (1st Estonian) SS Division under Armeeabteilung Narva.

== Organizational chart ==
Organizational chart of LIV Army Corps and the subsequent army detachments
Commander	Year	Date	Units attached to LIV Army Corps	Army	Army Commander	Army Group	Operational area
Erick-Oskar Hansen	1941	5 June	50th Infantry, 170th Infantry	11th Army	Eugen von Schobert	Army Group South	Odessa, Perekop
Erick-Oskar Hansen	1941	1 July	5th Romanian Infantry, 50th Infantry	11th Army	Eugen von Schobert	Army Group South	Odessa, Perekop
Erick-Oskar Hansen	1941	7 August	1st Romanian Cavalry Brigade, 5th Romanian Infantry, 50th Infantry, 72nd Infantry, 73rd Infantry	11th Army	Eugen von Schobert	Army Group South	Odessa, Perekop
Erick-Oskar Hansen	1941	3 September	72nd Infantry, 73rd Infantry	11th Army	Eugen von Schobert	Army Group South	Odessa, Perekop
Erick-Oskar Hansen	1941	2 October	46th Infantry, 50th Infantry, 73rd Infantry	11th Army	Erich von Manstein	Army Group South	Odessa, Perekop
Erick-Oskar Hansen	1941	4 November	50th Infantry, 132nd Infantry	11th Army	Erich von Manstein	Army Group South	Odessa, Perekop
Erick-Oskar Hansen	1941	4 December	22nd Infantry, 24th Infantry, 50th Infantry, 132nd Infantry	11th Army	Erich von Manstein	Army Group South	Odessa, Perekop
Erick-Oskar Hansen	1942	2 January	22nd Infantry, 24th Infantry, 50th Infantry, 132nd Infantry	11th Army	Erich von Manstein	Army Group South	Crimea / Sevastopol
Erick-Oskar Hansen	1942	6 February	1st Romanian Mountain Brigade, 22nd Infantry, 24th Infantry, 132nd Infantry	11th Army	Erich von Manstein	Army Group South	Crimea / Sevastopol
Erick-Oskar Hansen	1942	10 March	1st Romanian Mountain Brigade, 22nd Infantry, 24th Infantry, 50th Infantry	11th Army	Erich von Manstein	Army Group South	Crimea / Sevastopol
Erick-Oskar Hansen	1942	5 April	1st Romanian Mountain Brigade, 10th Romanian Infantry, 18th Romanian Infantry, 22nd Infantry, 24th Infantry, 50th Infantry	11th Army	Erich von Manstein	Army Group South	Crimea / Sevastopol
Erick-Oskar Hansen	1942	11 May	1st Romanian Mountain Brigade, 18th Romanian Infantry, 22nd Infantry, 24th Infantry	11th Army	Erich von Manstein	Army Group South	Crimea / Sevastopol
Erick-Oskar Hansen	1942	8 June	22nd Infantry, 24th Infantry, 50th Infantry, 132nd Infantry	11th Army	Erich von Manstein	Army Group South	Crimea / Sevastopol
Erick-Oskar Hansen	1942	4 July	4th Romanian Mountain, 22nd Infantry, 24th Infantry, 50th Infantry, 132nd Infantry	11th Army	Erich von Manstein	Army Group South	Crimea / Sevastopol
Erick-Oskar Hansen	1942	5 August	24th Infantry, 50th Infantry, 72nd Infantry	11th Army	Erich von Manstein	Army Group A	Crimea / Sevastopol
Erick-Oskar Hansen	1942	2 September	24th Infantry, 250th "Blue" Infantry	18th Army	Georg Lindemann	Army Group North	Leningrad
Erick-Oskar Hansen	1942	8 October	250th "Blue" Infantry, SS Polizei Division	11th Army	Erich von Manstein	OKH reserves (north)	Leningrad
Erick-Oskar Hansen	1942	5 November	250th "Blue" Infantry	18th Army	Georg Lindemann	Army Group North	Leningrad
Erick-Oskar Hansen	1942	1 December	5th Mountain, 170th Infantry, 250th "Blue" Infantry, SS Polizei Division	18th Army	Georg Lindemann	Army Group North	Leningrad
Erick-Oskar Hansen	1943	1 January	5th Mountain, 250th "Blue" Infantry, SS Polizei Division	18th Army	Georg Lindemann	Army Group North	Leningrad
Carl Hilpert	1943	3 February	1st Infantry, 5th Mountain, 223rd Infantry, 227th Infantry, SS Polizei Division	18th Army	Georg Lindemann	Army Group North	Leningrad
Carl Hilpert	1943	4 March	1st Infantry, 5th Mountain, 223rd Infantry	18th Army	Georg Lindemann	Army Group North	Leningrad
Carl Hilpert	1943	9 April	21st Infantry, 24th Infantry, 58th Infantry, 254th Infantry, SS Polizei Division	18th Army	Georg Lindemann	Army Group North	Leningrad
Carl Hilpert	1943	1 May	21st Infantry, 24th Infantry, 58th Infantry, 254th Infantry, SS Polizei Division	18th Army	Georg Lindemann	Army Group North	Leningrad
Carl Hilpert	1943	1 June	21st Infantry, 24th Infantry, 58th Infantry, 254th Infantry, SS Polizei Division	18th Army	Georg Lindemann	Army Group North	Leningrad
Carl Hilpert	1943	7 July	21st Infantry, 24th Infantry, 58th Infantry, 254th Infantry, SS Polizei Division	18th Army	Georg Lindemann	Army Group North	Leningrad
Otto Sponheimer	1943	5 August	21st Infantry, 24th Infantry, 254th Infantry, SS Polizei Division	18th Army	Georg Lindemann	Army Group North	Leningrad
Otto Sponheimer	1943	5 September	11th Infantry, 24th Infantry, 28th Infantry, SS Polizei Division	18th Army	Georg Lindemann	Army Group North	Leningrad
Otto Sponheimer	1943	4 October	11th Infantry, 24th Infantry, 225th Infantry, SS Polizei Division	18th Army	Georg Lindemann	Army Group North	Leningrad
Otto Sponheimer	1943	8 November	11th Infantry, 24th Infantry, 225th Infantry, SS Polizei Division	18th Army	Georg Lindemann	Army Group North	Leningrad
Otto Sponheimer	1943	3 December	11th Infantry, 24th Infantry, 225th Infantry	18th Army	Georg Lindemann	Army Group North	Leningrad
Otto Sponheimer	1944	1 January	11th Infantry, 24th Infantry, 225th Infantry	18th Army	Georg Lindemann	Army Group North	Leningrad
Johannes Frießner	1944	3 March	III SS Corps (61st Infantry, 11th SS, 20th SS, FHH, 4th SS Bde) XXVI Corps (11th Infantry, 225th Infantry) 58th Infantry, 170th Infantry, 227th Infantry	army-level formation		Army Group North	Baltic
Johannes Frießner	1944	15 April	III SS Corps (20th SS, 11th SS, 4th SS Bde) XXXXIII Corps (FHH, 227th Infantry) XXVI Corps (11th Infantry, 58th Infantry, 225th Infantry) 61st Infantry, 122nd Infantry, 170th Infantry, 285th Infantry	army-level formation		Army Group North	Baltic
Johannes Frießner	1944	15 May	III SS Corps (20th SS, 11th SS, 4th SS Bde) XXXXIII Corps (FHH, 227th Infantry) XXVI Corps (170th Infantry, 225th Infantry, 227th Infantry) 227th Infantry, 285th Infantry	army-level formation		Army Group North	Baltic
Johannes Frießner	1944	15 June	III SS Corps (20th SS, 11th SS, 4th SS Bde) XXXXIII Corps (11th Infantry, 58th Infantry, 122nd Infantry) XXVI Corps (170th Infantry, 225th Infantry, 227th Infantry) 61st Infantry, 285th Infantry	army-level formation		Army Group North	Baltic
Johannes Frießner	1944	15 July	III SS Corps (20th SS, 11th SS, 4th SS Bde) XXXXIII Corps (58th Infantry, 227th Infantry) 285th Infantry	army-level formation		Army Group North	Baltic
Johannes Frießner	1944	31 August	III SS Corps (4th SS Bde, 6th SS Bde, 11th SS, 11th Infantry) II Corps (5th SS Bde, Panzerbrigade 101, 87th Infantry, 207th Infantry, 563rd Infantry)	army-level formation		Army Group North	Baltic
Johannes Frießner	1944	16 September	III SS Corps (4th SS Bde, 5th SS Bde, 6th SS Bde, 11th SS, 20th SS, 11th Infantry, 300th Infantry) II Corps (87th Infantry, 207th Infantry, 563rd Infantry)	army-level formation		Army Group North	Baltic
Anton Grasser	1944	13 October	XXXVIII Corps (32nd Infantry, 81st Infantry, 121st Infantry, 122nd Infantry, 201st Infantry, 329th Infantry) 52nd Infantry	army-level formation		Army Group North	Baltic
Philipp Kleffel	1944		Unknown	army-level formation		Army Group North	Baltic
Friedrich Christiansen	1944	31 December	LXXXVIII Corps (2nd Parachute, 6th Parachute), XXX Corps (346th Infantry)	army-level formation		Army Group H	Netherlands
