= Karl von Graffen =

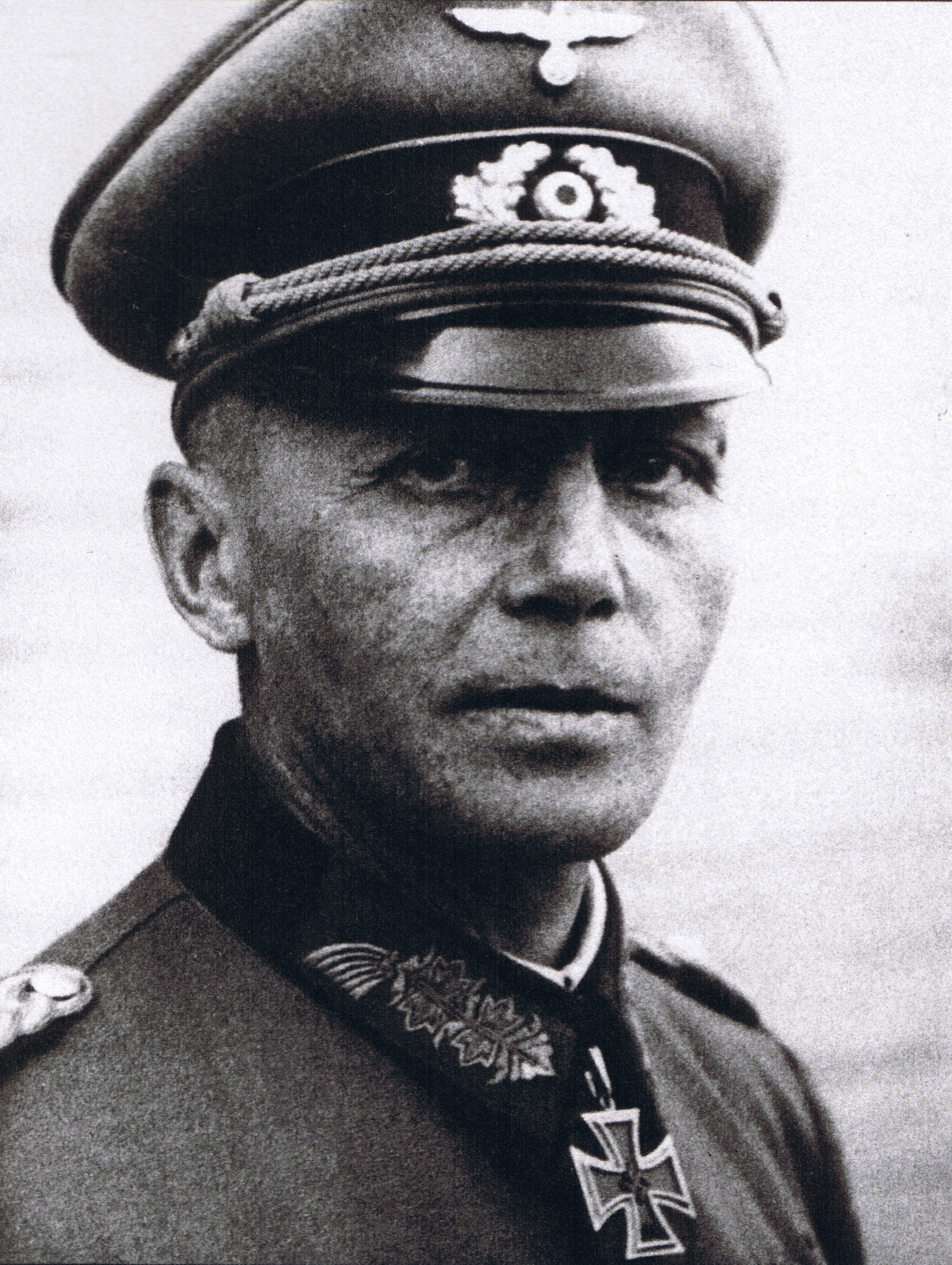
- Born: 6 June 1893; Plön, Province of Schleswig-Holstein, Kingdom of Prussia, German Empire
- Died: 1 November 1964 (aged 71); Grödersby, Schleswig-Holstein, West Germany
- Military career
- Allegiance: German Empire; Weimar Republic; Nazi Germany
- Branch: Prussian Army; Imperial German Army; Reichswehr; Army (Wehrmacht)
- Service years: 1911–1945
- Rank: Generalleutnant
- Commands: 58th Infantry Division; LXXVI Panzer Corps
- Conflicts: World War I World War II
- Awards: Knight's Cross of the Iron Cross

Karl von Graffen (6 June 1893 – 1 November 1964) was a highly decorated German general during World War II who held divisional and corps level commands. He was a recipient of the Knight's Cross of the Iron Cross of Nazi Germany.

In the First World War Graffen fought in Crimea, Ypres, Ginchy, Arras and Yser earning the second and first class Iron Cross. He served with the 60th Artillery Regiment and the 65th Reserve Field Artillery Regiment.

Graffen was taken prisoner in May 1945 by the US 85th Infantry Division near Belluno, Italy, and was released in March 1948.

His granddaughter, Angela Findlay, has written a book (In my Grandfather's Shadow ISBN 978-0-552-17772-6) about her relationship to his legacy. Findlay has also discussed this on a number of Podcasts and at Book Festivals.

== Awards and decorations ==
- Order of the Griffon (Mecklenburg), Knight's Cross on 29 September 1912
- Iron Cross (1914), 2nd and 1st Class
  - 2nd Class on 25 September 1914
  - 1st Class on 25 November 1916
- Military Merit Cross (Mecklenburg-Schwerin), 2nd and 1st Class
  - 2nd Class on 8 December 1914
  - 1st Class on 6 October 1916
- Military Merit Cross (Austria-Hungary) 3rd Class with War Decoration on 25 July 1917
- Hanseatic Cross of Hamburg on 8 September 1917
- Honour Cross of the World War 1914/1918 with Swords on 9 January 1935
- Wehrmacht Long Service Award, 4th to 1st Class on 3 October 1936
- Order of St. Sava, Commander's Cross on 1 December 1938
- Repetition Clasp 1939 to the Iron Cross 1914, 2nd and 1st Class
  - 2nd Class on 17 June 1940
  - 1st Class on 29 June 1941
- German Cross in Gold on 24 December 1941
- Eastern Front Medal on 13 August 1942
- Knight's Cross of the Iron Cross on 13 August 1942 as Generalmajor and commander of 58. Infanterie-Division

== Sources ==
- Fellgiebel, Walther-Peer (2000) [1986]. Die Träger des Ritterkreuzes des Eisernen Kreuzes 1939–1945 [The Bearers of the Knight's Cross of the Iron Cross 1939–1945] (in German). Friedberg, Germany: Podzun-Pallas. ISBN 978-3-7909-0284-6.
- Patzwall, Klaus D.; Scherzer, Veit (2001). Das Deutsche Kreuz 1941 – 1945 Geschichte und Inhaber Band II [The German Cross 1941 – 1945 History and Recipients Volume 2] (in German). Norderstedt, Germany: Verlag Klaus D. Patzwall. ISBN 978-3-931533-45-8.
- Findlay, Angela (2022). In My Grandfather's Shadow: A Story of War, Trauma and the Legacy of Silence. Bantam Press. ISBN 978-1787634060.
- Operation Report of 337th Infantry Regiment. National Archives, College Park, MD. 1945.

Military offices
Preceded by Generalleutnant Friedrich Altrichter	Commander of 58. Infanterie-Division; 2 April 1941 – 1 May 1943	Succeeded by General der Artillerie Wilhelm Berlin
Preceded by General der Panzertruppe Gerhard Graf von Schwerin	Commander of LXXVI. Panzerkorps; 25 April 1945 – 8 May 1945	Succeeded by None
