= Altrichter =

Altrichter is a surname. Notable people with the surname include:

- Friedrich Altrichter (1890–1948), German officer
- Petr Altrichter (born 1951), Czech conductor
- Rudolf Altrichter (1916–1978), Slovak artist / graphic designer
