= 1st Infantry Division (Wehrmacht) =

1934–1945 German Army combat formation

- German: 1. Infanterie-Division
- Unit insignia
- Active: October 1934 – 8 May 1945
- Country: Nazi Germany
- Branch: Heer ( Wehrmacht)
- Type: Infantry
- Size: Division
- Garrison/HQ: Königsberg
- Engagements: Memelland occupation; World War II; Invasion of Poland; Battle of Mława; Siege of Warsaw; Battle of France; German-Soviet War; Operation Barbarossa; Siege of Leningrad; Kamenets-Podolsky pocket

Commanders
- Notable commanders: Georg von Küchler; Walther Schroth; Joachim von Kortzfleisch; Philipp Kleffel; Friedrich Altrichter; Martin Grase; Ernst-Anton von Krosigk; Henning von Thadden

The 1st Infantry Division (German: 1. Infanterie-Division) was an infantry division that notably served in World War II as part of the Heer of Nazi Germany's Wehrmacht. It had been one of the original infantry divisions of the Reichswehr.

== Operational history ==
=== Before World War II ===
The staff of the 1st Infantry Division was initially assembled under the cover name of Artillery Leader 1 (German: Artillerieführer I) in October 1934. Its initial headquarters were at Königsberg. On 15 October 1935, the formation was redesignated as the 1st Infantry Division. It was redeployed to Insterburg on 3 February 1936. The division initially contained the Infantry Regiments 1 (Königsberg), 22 (Gumbinnen), and 43 (Insterburg), as well as Artillery Regiment 1 (Königsberg). The division was built from the Reichswehr-era 1st Infantry Regiment, assembled largely from East Prussian personnel and adopted a strongly Prussian internal culture, as underlined by the black-and-white divisional insignia.

The divisional commander from 1 October 1934 until 1 October 1935 was Georg von Küchler, who later went on to be the army-level commanding general that the 1st Infantry Division served under starting in September 1939. Küchler was replaced as divisional commander by Walther Schroth on 1 October 1935, who was in turn replaced by Joachim von Kortzfleisch on 1 January 1938.

On 23 March 1939, after a German ultimatum of three days prior regarding the Klaipėda Region, since 1923 part of Lithuania, had been accepted by the Lithuanian government and a treaty signed by Joachim von Ribbentrop and Juozas Urbšys, soldiers of the 1st Infantry Division moved from their East Prussian barracks to occupy the city of Klaipėda (German: Memel), thus participating in that city's annexation to Nazi Germany through an ultimatum.

On 17 August 1939, the 1st Infantry Division initiated mobilization procedures as part of the German preparations for the Invasion of Poland.

Campaigns of 1st Infantry Division
1 Invasion of Poland, 1939
2 Battle of France, 1940
3 German-Soviet War, 1941–45

=== World War II ===
==== Invasion of Poland ====
With the German Invasion of Poland in September 1939, the 1st Infantry Division fought in the northern sector. The division advanced toward Warsaw as a component of the XXVI Army Corps (until 1 October 1939: "Army Corps Wodrig", commanded by Albert Wodrig), subordinate to the 3rd Army (Georg von Küchler). The division's commanding general was Joachim von Kortzfleisch, while the chief of staff and head of logistics were Major Johannes Steffler and Captain Christian Müller.

On 1 September 1939, it captured Kuklin on the left flank of the 3rd Army. It engaged Polish forces near the heavily defended town of Mława (Battle of Mława) for several days, then crossed over the Bug and Narew rivers. On 8 September 1939, 1st and 12th Infantry Divisions captured the Ostrów Mazowiecka region. On September 10, the 1st and 12th Infantry Divisions formed a bridgehead south of Brok and Małkinia Górna. On the 12th, the 1st Infantry Division reached the road between Kałuszyn and Siedlce, where it was engaged by Polish counterattacks on its left flank. On 16 September, Wodrig Corps met heavy resistance from scattered Polish formations; the nearby 12th Infantry Division secured the Kałuszyn-Latowicz area, whereas 1st Infantry Division itself was assigned to the area east of Garwolin.

The strategic balance of the German campaign in Poland was decisively altered by the Soviet invasion of Poland that started on 17 September 1939; the 1st Infantry Division was subsequently deployed to the Stanisławów area, with 12th Infantry Division assigned further south in Mińsk Mazowiecki, with both division participating in the Siege of Warsaw. It advanced to Łochów two days later; on 25 September it was northwest of Ostrów Mazowiecka as its army corps was preparing to withdraw behind the Narew river. By the evening of the 26th, the 1st Infantry Division was northwest of Różan, whereas its partner, the 12th Infantry Division, stood south of Maków Mazowiecki.

==== Phony War ====
On 2 November, a supply train of 1st Infantry Division suffered a major accident near Bütow (Pommern). Due to the involvement of a staff car carrying divisional officers in the accidents, three officers of the division were killed and twelve more critically injured. 18 other men, including officers, NCOs and enlisted men, suffered light injuries.

As the Phony War period (Oct. 1939 – Apr. 1940) ended, 1st Infantry Division stood by in the reserves of the 6th Army.

On 15 April 1940, Philipp Kleffel assumed command of the 1st Infantry Division.

==== Battle of France ====
The division played only a minor role in the Battle of France, then as part of I Army Corps. On 3 July 1940, with the invasion concluded, the division was in the vicinity of Biarritz. On 28 August, as part of a reorganization of the army corps' occupation duties, 1st Infantry Division was placed on the sea shore, with its partner division, the 11th Infantry Division, on the demarcation line between German-occupied northern France and the Vichy French territory.

==== Preparations for the Eastern Front ====
In September 1940, the 1st Infantry Division was shuffled out of German-occupied France and sent back to its home region, East Prussia. The train transport from France to East Prussia began on 8 September. By 2 October, the divisional headquarters were established in the Hindenburgstraße in Königsberg. It began taking quarters for the eventual invasion, northwest of Tapiau, on 10 March. Divisional headquarters were moved there as well, by 18 April.

==== Eastern Front ====
With the launch of Operation Barbarossa, the 1st Infantry Division participated in the Baltic Operation as part of the 18th Army with Army Group North, advancing on Leningrad. It stood in the Pskov–Tartu sector in July; it provided cover to 58th Infantry Division as it entered the city of Pskov from the west. On 17 July, it stood in heavy fighting east of Lake Peipus, making only slow stepwise progress towards Gdov. That city was captured by the 58th Infantry Division around 07:30 hours on 18 July, while vanguards of the 1st Infantry Division reached Kortno by the evening.

Kleffel's tenure as divisional commander was briefly interrupted on 12 July 1941 by Friedrich Altrichter, but Kleffel resumed command on 4 September.

On 24 July, parts of the 1st Infantry Division were inserted into a bridgehead that had previously been forced by the 6th Panzer Division. By 13 August, it met Soviet infantry in well-entrenched positions around one kilometer south of Manuilovo.

Following a directive by OKH on 15 October 1942, every single infantry regiment in the German army was redesignated as a "Grenadier Regiment", although regiments who claimed the tradition of specific Imperial German Army or Reichswehr units could also petition for their redesignation as "Fusilier Regiment" or "Rifle Regiment". In the case of the 1st Infantry Division, this resulted in the Grenadier Regiments 1 and 43 as well as the Fusilier Regiment 22.

The 1st Infantry Division remained and fought in the area of Leningrad and Lake Ladoga through December 1943, as part of the German operations during the Siege of Leningrad. Transferred to the 1st Panzer Army, the division fought at Krivoy Rog and broke out of an encirclement in March 1944.

==== Defence of East Prussia ====
The 1st Infantry Division returned to its native East Prussia in the summer 1944. In September 1944, the division received reinforcements to restore its regiments' 3rd battalions, bringing the division up to a strength of 10 battalions. Except for participating in the urgent and temporary link-up with the now-isolated Army Group North in Lithuania (Operation Doppelkopf), the unit remained to defend the easternmost German province from the advancing Red Army.

On 1 October 1944, Hans Schittnig assumed divisional command.

Alternating between 3rd Panzer and 4th Armies, the division was trapped in the Königsberg/Samland area after it was cut off from the rest of Germany by end January 1945.

At 0400 hours on 19 February 1945, elements of the 1st Infantry, led by a captured Soviet T-34 tank, spearheaded a westward offensive from Königsberg intended to link with General Hans Gollnick's XXVIII Corps, which held parts of the Samland peninsula, including the vital port of Pillau. Capturing the town of Metgethen, the unit opened the way for the 5th Panzer Division to join with Gollnick's forces near the town of Gross Heydekrug the next day. This action re-opened the land route from Königsberg to Pillau, allowing for the evacuation of civilian refugees via the port and solidifying the German defense of the area until April.

Henning von Thadden assumed divisional command on 28 February 1945.

With the capitulation of Königsberg on 9 April 1945, the surviving elements of the division retreated to Pillau where most later surrendered to the Soviets and parts of the division were evacuated by sea and surrendered to the British in Schleswig-Holstein at the end of the war.

The final divisional commander was a colonel-ranked officer named Egon Overbeck, who assumed the post on 26 April 1945, after Henning von Thadden had been wounded in action.

== Organization ==
=== Subordinate formations ===
Initially, the 1st Infantry Division consisted of the Infantry Regiments 1 (Königsberg), 22 (Gumbinnen) and 43 (Insterburg), as well as Artillery Regiment 1 (Königsberg) and the Division Units 1 for support. Each of the infantry regiment was equipped with three battalions and the artillery regiment with three detachments. By November 1944, this scheme had been only superficially changed; the Infantry Regiments 1 and 43 were now called "Grenadier Regiments", whereas Infantry Regiment 22 was now called "Fusilier Regiment". Additionally, the division had received the Division Fusilier Battalion 1 and Artillery Regiment 1 had been strengthened with the addition of I./37 detachment.

=== Superior formations ===
Superior formations of the 1st Infantry Division, Sep. 1939 – Apr. 1945
Month	Army Corps	Army	Army Group	Area of operations
Sep. – Nov. 1939	Corps Wodrig	3rd Army	Army Group North	East Prussia, northern Poland
Dec. 1939 – Apr. 1940	Army reserves	6th Army	Army Group B	Lower Rhine
May 1940	Army reserves	6th Army	Army Group B	Belgium
June 1940	I Corps	4th Army	Army Group B	Somme—Loire region
Jul. – Aug. 1940	I Corps	7th Army	Army Group B	Atlantic coast
Sep. 1940 – Apr. 1941	I Corps	18th Army	Army Group B	East Prussia
May 1941	I Corps	18th Army	Army Group C	East Prussia
June 1941	I Corps	18th Army	Army Group North	Riga — Narva — Leningrad
July 1941	XXVI Corps	18th Army	Army Group North	Riga — Narva — Leningrad
August 1941	XXXXI Corps	Panzer Group 4	Army Group North	Riga — Narva — Leningrad
Sep. – Oct. 1941	XXXVIII Corps	18th Army	Army Group North	Petergof
November 1941	Army reserves	18th Army	Army Group North	Leningrad
Dec. 1941 – Apr. 1942	XXVIII Corps	18th Army	Army Group North	Leningrad
May 1942	XXVI Corps	18th Army	Army Group North	Volkhov
Jun. – Dec. 1942	I Corps	18th Army	Army Group North	Volkhov
January 1943	XXVI Corps	18th Army	Army Group North	Lake Ladoga
Feb. – Mar. 1943	LIV Corps	18th Army	Army Group North	Lake Ladoga
Apr. – Aug. 1943	XXVI Corps	18th Army	Army Group North	Lake Ladoga
Sep. – Dec. 1943	XXVIII Corps	18th Army	Army Group North	Tigoda
January 1944	Army reserves	1st Panzer Army	Army Group South	Vinnytsia
Feb. – Mar. 1944	XXXXVI Panzer Corps	1st Panzer Army	Army Group South	"Hube Pocket"
April 1944	III Army Corps	1st Panzer Army	Army Group North Ukraine	"Hube Pocket"
May – Jun. 1944	XXXXVI Panzer Corps	1st Panzer Army	Army Group North Ukraine	Stanislav
July 1944	LIX Army Corps	1st Panzer Army	Army Group North Ukraine	Brody
August 1944	XXVI Army Corps	3rd Panzer Army	Army Group Center	Dobrovolsk
Sep. – Oct. 1944	XXVI Army Corps	4th Army	Army Group Center	Dobrovolsk
Nov. 1944 – Jan. 1945	XXVI Army Corps	3rd Panzer Army	Army Group Center	Dobrovolsk
February 1945	XXXXI Panzer Corps	4th Army	Army Group North	Königsberg
March 1945	Army reserves	Army Detachment Samland	Army Group North	Samland peninsula
April 1945	XXVI Army Corps	Army East Prussia	None	Pillau

=== Commanders ===
The following officers commanded the 1st Infantry Division:

- 1 October 1934 – 1 April 1935: Generalmajor Georg von Küchler
- 1 April 1935 – 31 December 1937: Generalmajor / Generalleutnant Walther Schroth
- 1 January 1938 – 14 April 1940: Generalmajor / Generalleutnant Joachim von Kortzfleisch
- 14 April 1940 – 12 July 1941: Generalmajor / Generalleutnant Philipp Kleffel
- 12 July – 4 September 1941: Generalmajor Friedrich Altrichter
- 4 September 1941 – 16 January 1942: Generalleutnant Philipp Kleffel
- 16 January 1942 – 30 June 1943: Generalmajor / Generalleutnant Martin Grase
- 1 July 1943 – 10 May 1944: Oberst / Generalmajor / Generalleutnant Ernst-Anton von Krosigk
- 10 May 1944 – 8 June 1944: Oberst Hans-Joachim Baurmeister
- 8 June 1944 – 30 September 1944: Generalleutnant Ernst-Anton von Krosigk
- 1 October 1944 – 28 February 1945: Generalmajor / Generalleutnant Hans Schittnig
- 28 February 1945 – 26 April 1945: Generalleutnant Henning von Thadden
- after 26 April 1945: Oberst Egon Overbeck

== Insignia ==
Inspired by its strong geographic and cultural ties with Prussia, the 1st Infantry Division adopted the coat of arms of the House of Hohenzollern, a black-and-white quartered shield, as its divisional insignia.

== Sources ==
=== Literature ===
- Christopher Duffy. Red Storm on the Reich: The Soviet March on Germany, 1945. New York: Atheneum, 1991. pp 164,165,207 ISBN 0-689-12092-3
- Samuel W. Mitcham: Crumbling Empire: The German Defeat in the East, 1944. Westport: Praeger, 2001. pp 66,141 ISBN 0-275-96856-1
- Burkhard Müller-Hillebrand: Das Heer 1933–1945. Entwicklung des organisatorischen Aufbaues. Vol.III: Der Zweifrontenkrieg. Das Heer vom Beginn des Feldzuges gegen die Sowjetunion bis zum Kriegsende. Mittler: Frankfurt am Main 1969, p. 285.
- Georg Tessin: Verbände und Truppen der deutschen Wehrmacht und Waffen-SS im Zweiten Weltkrieg, 1939 – 1945. Vol. II: Die Landstreitkräfte 1 – 5. Mittler: Frankfurt am Main 1966.
