= Henning von Thadden =

German military officer

- Born: 24 September 1898; Brzeg, Province of Silesia, German Empire (now in Poland)
- Died: 18 May 1945 (aged 46); Vordingborg, Denmark
- Burial place: Kastrup war cemetery, Denmark
- Spouse: Marie-Luise Neutze (m. 1931)
- Military career
- Allegiance: (Germany) German Empire (1915–1918); (Germany) Weimar Republic (to 1933); Nazi Germany (1933–1945)
- Branch: Army
- Service years: 1915–1945
- Rank: Generalleutnant
- Commands: 1st Infantry Division
- Conflicts: World War I; World War II

Henning von Thadden (24 September 1898 – 18 May 1945) was a German military officer who last held the rank of Generalleutnant. He fought in both World Wars and acted as Chief of Staff during several campaigns in World War II.

== Early life ==
Henning von Thadden was born in Brzeg (German: Brieg), Lower Silesia (now in Poland) to regimental commander Wilhelm von Thadden. From 1903 he attended schools in Świdnica (Schweidnitz), Frankfurt (Oder) and Magdeburg. He graduated from the Knights' Academy in Legnica (Liegnitz) and shortly afterwards joined the imperial German army as an ensign in the 2nd West Prussian Grenadier Regiment. He was promoted to Leutnant in this unit and was deployed to fight in France in 1915.

== Military career ==
Von Thadden was wounded in World War I, but remained in the army after the war serving in various regiments. In 1930, he was posted to the staff of the 4th Division and in 1934 he served in the staff of Military District VIII in Wrocław.

During the invasion of Poland, von Thadden was staff officer of the XVII Army Corps in 1939 and later joined the Battle of France in 1940 in this same capacity. As Chief of Staff of the XVII Army Corps, he participated in the Soviet campaign in 1941. He was Chief of Staff of the 7th Army from March 1943 to July 1943.

=== 20 July 1944 attempt on Hitler ===
From 10 July 1944 to 31 December 1944, von Thadden was Chief of Staff of Defence District Command I in Königsberg. He was at Adolf Hitler's headquarters on 20 July 1944, when the assassination attempt on Hitler took place. Shortly before, he had had a conversation with Stauffenberg and Chief of Staff Walther Buhle.

=== Injury and death ===
On 27 February 1945, Henning von Thadden took over command of the 1st Infantry Division from Generalleutnant Hans Schittnig. He was severely wounded in April 1945 near Primorsk (German: Fischhausen) in East Prussia. When Thadden had been brought to Sassnitz, his family last learned of his fate in late April 1945. After having been transferred to Denmark, von Thadden died in the field hospital of Vordingborg on 18 May 1945. He was interred at the military cemetery of Kastrup on Zealand island.

== Private life ==
During his education at the Dresden Infantry School from 1930 to 1933, von Thadden married the 18-year-old orphan Marie-Luise Neutze in 1931. The couple had two sons and a daughter.
