= 4th Infantry Division (Wehrmacht) =

- German: 4. Infanterie-Division
- Unit insignia
- Active: 1 October 1934 – 15 August 1940
- Country: Nazi Germany
- Branch: German Army
- Type: Infantry
- Size: Division
- Garrison/HQ: Dresden
- Engagements: World War II

The 4th Infantry Division, designated 4.Infanterie-Division in German was one of the first divisions raised and served during part of World War II. In 1940 it was reorganized as 14th Panzer Division.

== History ==
The 4th Infantry Division was raised in October 1934 in Dresden. It took part in the Invasion of Poland in 1939 and later the Battle of France in 1940. Later that year it was converted into the 14th Panzer Division.

== Organization ==
In 1937, the division's units were:

- Infantry Regiment 10
- Infantry Regiment 52
- Infantry Regiment 103
- Artillery Regiment 4
- I./Artillerie-Regiment 40
- Anti-tank (Panzer-Abwehr) Detachment 4
- Pioneer Battalion 4
- Signals (Nachricten) Detachment 4
- Machine gun Battalion 7

By 1939, the division's units were:

- Infanterie-Regiment 10
- Infanterie-Regiment 52
- Infanterie-Regiment 103
- Artillerie-Regiment 4
- I./Artillerie-Regiment 40
- Aufklärungs-Abteilung 4 (reconnaissance battalion)
- Panzerjäger-Abteilung 4 (anti-tank battalion)
- Pionier-Battalion 13 (engineer battalion)
- Nachrichten-Abteilung 4 (signals battalion)

== Commanders ==
The following officers commanded 4th Infantry Division:

- April 1, 1934, to November 10, 1938, Oberst (colonel) Erich Raschick
- November 10, 1938, to August 15, 1940, Gen. Lt. Erick Hansen

== Knight's Cross ==
No members of 4th Infantry Division were awarded the Knight's Cross of the Iron Cross.

== War service ==
Polish Campaign:

- September 1939: part of IV Corps, 10.Armee, German Army Group South

Low Countries and France:

- May 1940: reserve division of German Army Group A
- June 1940: part of IV Corps of 6.Armee of German Army Group B

== See also ==
List of German divisions in World War II
