= 154th Infantry Division (Wehrmacht) =

154. Division; Division No. 154 154th Reserve Division 154th Infantry Division
- 154th Division; Division Nr. 154; 154. Reserve-Division; 154. Infanterie-Division
- Active: 1941
- Country: Nazi Germany
- Branch: Army
- Type: Infantry
- Size: Division

The 154th Infantry Division (German: 154. Infanterie-Division), also known as Commander of the Replacement Troops IV (German: Kommandeur der Ersatztruppen IV), Division No. 154 (German: Division Nr. 154), 154th Reserve Division (German: 154. Reserve-Division), 154th Division (German: 154. Division) and 154th Field Training Division (German: 154. Feldausbildungs-Division) was an infantry division of the German Heer during World War II.

== Operational history ==
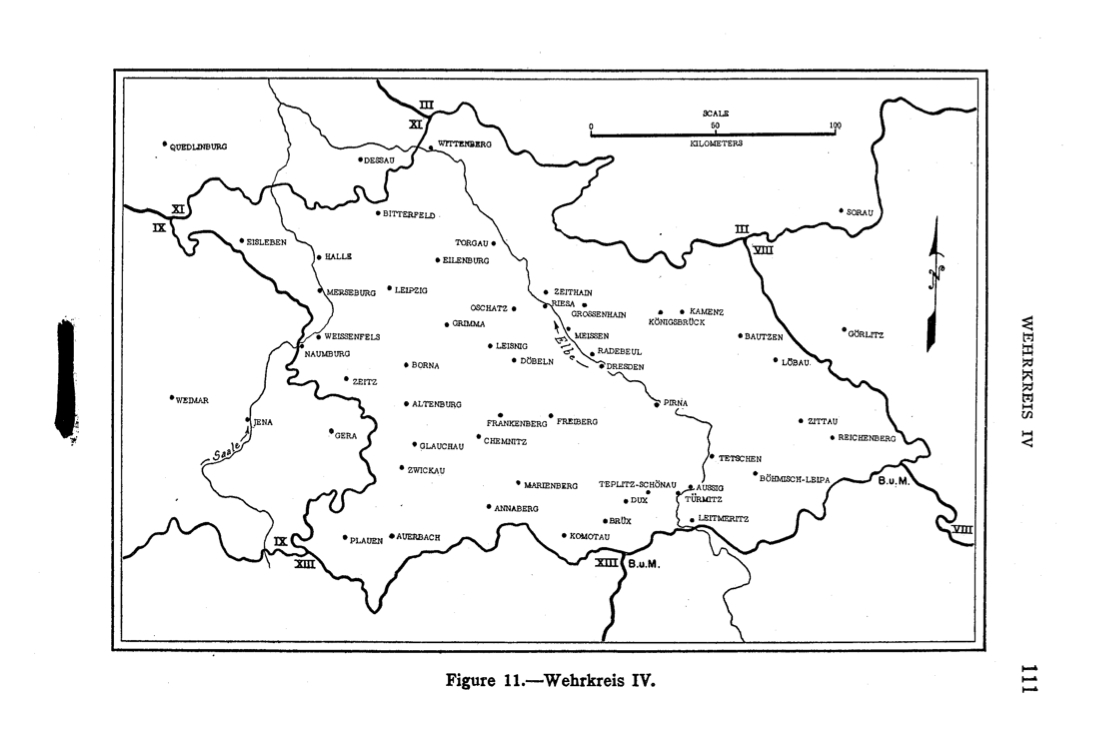
154th Division originally served as the reserve division for recruits from the fourth Military district (Wehrkeis), headquartered in Dresden.

During German mobilization on 26 August 1939, each Wehrkreis (military district) was assigned a division to organize the reserves and training of recruits. The Wehrkreis IV (Saxony) was assigned the Kommandeur der Ersatztruppen IV. The division was redesignated 154. Division on 10 November 1939 and Division Nr. 154 on 27 December 1939. The commander, starting on 27 September 1939, was Arthur Boltze. The division served as the administrative body and the training divisions for all recruits of Wehrkreis IV. As a result, its main trainees were Saxons and Sudeten Germans. The formation of 174th Division on 10 June 1940 only left the division with Infantry Reserve Regiment 4 Dresden, Infantry Reserve Regiment 223 Bautzen, Infantry Reserve Regiment 255 Löbau, Infantry Reserve Regiment 256 Teplitz and Artillery Reserve Regiment 4 Dresden, in addition to several small reserve detachments.

The division was commanded by Franz Landgraf starting on 1 May 1942 and by Friedrich Altrichter starting in June. It was reequipped on 15 June 1942 and redesignated 154. Reserve-Division. It was redeployed to Landshut in the General Government in occupied Poland. At this point, it consisted of Infantry Reserve Grenadier Regiments 56 Jaroslau, 223 Krakau, and 255 Lemberg, as well Reserve Artillery Detachmanet 24 Reichshof.

The division was reorganized on 5 March 1944 after the dissolution of the staffs used for Infantry Division Generalgouvernment. It was now commanded by Alfried Thielmann. The Intervention Group Zimmer (German: Eingreifgruppe Zimmer) was formed from elements of the 154th Division, deployed to the Namslau area and integrated into the 68th Infantry Division. The 154th Reserve Division served under 17th Army from August 1944, and then under 1st Panzer Army starting in September 1944. Parts of the division saw combat as early as March 1944, and the entire division was called into combat after the collapse of Army Group Centre that started in July as a result of the Red Army's Operation Bagration.

The remainders of the 154th were then merged with parts of the 174th Division to form a new iteration of the 154th on 1 October 1944, dubbed the 154. Feldausbildungs-Division, or just 154. Division. This division consisted of the Field Training Grenadier Regiments 562 through 564 as well as Artillery Field Training Detachment 1054, along with Heavy Battalion 1054 and Engineer Field Training Battalion 1054. The 154th Field Training Division remained in service under the 1st Panzer Army for its entire lifespawn. The division was again commanded by Friedrich Altrichter starting 19 December 1944. Altrichter would remain in command until the end of the war.

In March 1945, following an order on 11 February, the division was redesignated a final time and became 154. Infanterie-Division. which consisted of all segments of the previous 154th Field Training Division as well as the Panzerjäger Detachment 1054. The division continued to serve under 1st Panzer Army. It was overrun by Soviet forces at Oderberg on 17 April 1945 and destroyed. Its commander, Friedrich Altrichter, was captured along with most of his surviving subordinates and died in a Soviet prison in 1949.

== Noteworthy Individuals ==
- Arthur Boltze, divisional commander starting 27 September 1939.
- Franz Landgraf, divisional commander starting 1 May 1942.
- Friedrich Altrichter, divisional commander starting 31 May 1942 and again starting 19 December 1944. Final divisional commander.
- Alfred Thielmann, divisional commander starting 20 April 1944.
