= Anton Grasser =

German WWII army general (1891-1976)

- Born: 3 November 1891; Bossendorf, Alsace-Lorraine, German Empire
- Died: 3 November 1976 (aged 85); Stuttgart, Baden-Württemburg, West Germany
- Military career
- Allegiance: German Empire; Nazi Germany; West Germany
- Branch: Imperial German Army; German Army; Bundesgrenzschutz
- Service years: 1913–1918; 1936–1945; 1951–1953
- Rank: General der Infanterie
- Commands: 25th Infantry Division; LVI Panzer Corps; XXVI Army Corps; LXXII Army Corps
- Conflicts: World War I; World War II; Battle of France; Operation Barbarossa; Battle of Smolensk (1941); Battle of Uman; Battle of Moscow; Battle of Kursk; Battle of Smolensk (1943); Battle of Narva (1944); Prague Offensive
- Awards: Knight's Cross of the Iron Cross with Oak Leaves; Order of Merit of the Federal Republic of Germany
- Other work: Police Officer

Anton Grasser (3 November 1891 – 3 November 1976) was a German general during World War II who commanded several corps. He was a recipient of the Knight's Cross of the Iron Cross with Oak Leaves. Grasser joined the Bundesgrenzschutz (Federal Border Guards) in 1951, retiring in 1953.

In the 1950s, Grasser was involved in organizing an illegal underground army set up by Wehrmacht and Waffen-SS veterans in the event of a Soviet invasion of West Germany. Grasser's role, as inspector general of the police and border police, was to provide this secret army with weapons from the police force in case of war. Grasser was connected to it through Albert Schnez, its leader, who had been Grasser's employer in the first post-war years.

== Awards and decorations ==
- Iron Cross (1914) 2nd Class (18 June 1915) & 1st Class (6 June 1916)
- Clasp to the Iron Cross (1939) 2nd Class (21 May 1940) & 1st Class (8 June 1940)
- German Cross in Gold on 11 March 1943 as Generalleutnant and commander of 25. Infanterie-Division
- Knight's Cross of the Iron Cross with Oak Leaves
  - Knight's Cross on 16 June 1940 as Oberstleutnant and commander of Infanterie-Regiment 119
  - Oak Leaves on 5 December 1943 as Generalleutnant and commander of 25. Panzergrenadier-Division
- Order of Merit of the Federal Republic of Germany (1953)

Military offices
Preceded by Generalmajor Sigfrid Henrici	Commander of 25. Infanterie-Division; 4 February 1942 – 23 June 1943	Succeeded by Renamed 25th Panzergrenadier Division
Preceded by Previously 25th Infantry Division	Commander of 25. Panzergrenadier-Division; 23 June 1943 – 5 November 1943	Succeeded by Generalleutnant Dr. Fritz Benicke
Preceded by General der Infanterie Friedrich Hoßbach	Commander of LVI Panzer Corps; 14 November 1943 – 9 December 1943	Succeeded by General der Infanterie Friedrich Hoßbach
Preceded by General der Infanterie Martin Grase	Commander of XXVI. Armeekorps; 15 February 1944 – 11 May 1944	Succeeded by General der Artillerie Wilhelm Berlin
Preceded by General der Artillerie Wilhelm Berlin	Commander of XXVI. Armeekorps; 15 June 1944 – 6 July 1944	Succeeded by General der Infanterie Gerhard Matzky
Preceded by General der Infanterie Johannes Frießner	Commander of Armee-Abteilung Narwa renamed Armee-Abteilung Grasser; 3 July 1944 - 20 October 1944	Succeeded by Generalleutnant Philipp Kleffel
Preceded by Generalleutnant August Schmidt	Commander of LXXII. Armeekorps; 22 January 1945 – April 1945	Succeeded by Generalleutnant Werner Schmidt-Hammer
Preceded by none	Inspector of the Bundesgrenzschutz; 18 May 1951 – 30 June 1953	Succeeded by Brigadegeneral Kurt Andersen
