= Johannes Frießner =

German general (1892–1971)

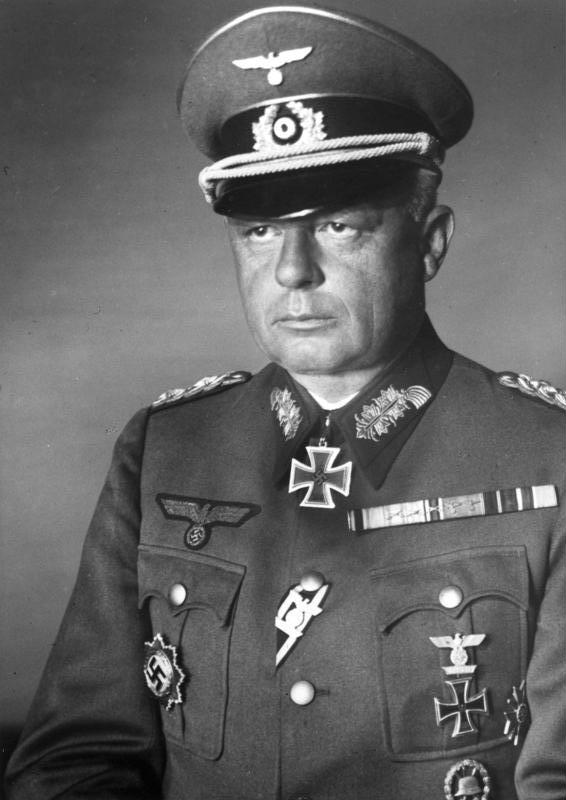
- Born: 22 March 1892; Chemnitz, German Empire
- Died: 26 June 1971 (aged 79); Bad Reichenhall, West Germany
- Military career
- Allegiance: German Empire; Weimar Republic; Nazi Germany
- Branch: German Army
- Service years: 1911–1945
- Rank: Generaloberst
- Commands: XXIII Army Corps
- Conflicts: World War I World War II
- Awards: Knight's Cross of the Iron Cross with Oak Leaves

Johannes Frießner (22 March 1892 – 26 June 1971) was a German general in the Wehrmacht during World War II. He was a recipient of the Knight's Cross of the Iron Cross with Oak Leaves.

== Biography ==
Born in Chemnitz, Saxony, Friessner enlisted in the German Army in 1911 and, after seeing extensive duty during World War I, served in the Reichswehr following the war.

After his promotion to Generalmajor during World War II on 1 August 1940, Frießner was assigned to the Eastern Front on 1 May 1942 and placed in command of the 102nd Infantry Division. Shortly after his promotion to Generalleutnant on 1 October 1942, Friessner served as commander of the XXIII Corps from 19 January to 11 December 1943. On 1 April 1943, he was promoted General der Infanterie (General of the Infantry).

In February 1944, Friessner was transferred to the Northern Front and assigned command to Sponheimer Group (renamed army detachment "Narva" on 23 February). Promoted to Generaloberst on 1 July, Friessner briefly held command of Army Group North until 25 July before being sent to the southern front to command Army Group South Ukraine (later redesignated Army Group South). Unable to halt the four month Soviet offensive by Marshal Rodion Malinovsky's Second Ukrainian Front, Friessner was relieved of his command on 22 December. Holding no further command for the remainder of the war, Frießner lived in retirement in Bayerisch Gmain until his death on 26 June 1971.

In September 1951 he was elected the chairman of the Verband deutscher Soldaten (Union of German Soldiers, VdS), however he resigned in December 1951. Frießner was no longer tenable as chairman of the VdS after he had justified the invasion of Poland as a legitimate measure to "protect the ethnic Germans in Poland" at a press conference on 21 September 1951 and he had favourably compared the "decently fighting Waffen-SS" to the officers of the 20 July plot, who, according to him, had chosen a method that was to be rejected "from the military point of view", and namely "political murder".

During the early 1950s he was active in advising on the redevelopment of the West German army, the Bundeswehr. In 1956, Frießner wrote Verratene Schlachten (Betrayed Battles), a memoir of his tour of command of Army Group South Ukraine.

== Awards ==
- Iron Cross (1914) 2nd Class (15 September 1914) & 1st Class (19 September 1916)
- Clasp to the Iron Cross (1939) 2nd Class (27 July 1942) & 1st Class (21 August 1942)
- German Cross in Gold on 9 June 1943 as General der Infanterie and commanding general of the XXXXI. Panzerkorps
- Knight's Cross of the Iron Cross with Oak Leaves
  - Knight's Cross on 23 July 1943 as General der Infanterie and commanding general of the XXIII. Armeekorps
  - 445th Oak Leaves 9 April 1944 as General der Infanterie and leader of the Army Detachment Narwa

Military offices
Preceded by Generalmajor Werner von Räsfeld	Commander of 102. Infantrie-Division; 1 May 1942 – 19 January 1943	Succeeded by General Otto Hitzfeld
Preceded by General der Infanterie Carl Hilpert	Commander of XXIII. Armeekorps; January 1943 – 7 December 1943	Succeeded by General der Panzertruppe Hans Freiherr von Funck
Preceded by General der Infanterie Otto Sponheimer (LIV. Armeekorps)	Commander of Army Detachment Narwa; 2 February 1944 - 3 July 1944	Succeeded by General der Infanterie Anton Grasser
Preceded by Generaloberst Georg Lindemann	Commander of Heeresgruppe Nord; 4 July 1944 – 23 July 1944	Succeeded by Generalfeldmarschall Ferdinand Schörner
Preceded by Generalfeldmarschall Erich von Manstein	Commander of Army Group South; 23 September 1944 – 28 December 1944	Succeeded by General der Infanterie Otto Wöhler
