= Carl Hilpert =

German WWII general (1888–1947)

- Born: 12 September 1888; Nuremberg
- Died: 1 February 1947 (aged 58); Moscow, Soviet Union
- Military career
- Allegiance: German Empire; Weimar Republic; Nazi Germany
- Branch: German Army
- Service years: 1907–1945
- Rank: Generaloberst
- Commands: LIX Corps; XXIII Corps; LIV Corps; XXVI Corps; I Corps; 16th Army; Army Group Courland
- Conflicts: World War I World War II
- Awards: Knight's Cross of the Iron Cross with Oak Leaves

Carl Hilpert (12 September 1888 – 1 February 1947) was a German general during World War II.

When World War II broke out in September 1939, Hilpert became chief of the staff of Armeeabteilung A on 9 September 1939 under the command of Kurt von Hammerstein-Equord, who was tasked with securing the western border with Belgium and the Netherlands. After its dissolution on 3 October, the staff was used to form the South Border Section Command in Kraków, where Hilpert remained active, before taking up the post of chief of staff of the 1st Army under Erwin von Witzleben on 5 February 1940. With this association, Hilpert took part in the Battle of France and after its successful completion on 1 October 1940, he was promoted to lieutenant general. Since Erwin von Witzleben, who had been appointed Generalfeldmarschall, now took over Army Group D (from April 1941 also Oberbefehlshaber West) in occupied France on 26 October 1940, Hilpert also succeeded him as the new Chief of Staff of the Army Group. Hilpert remained in this position for the next year and a half. After the daring British St Nazaire Raid revealed the poor state of western defences in March 1942, Hilpert was removed from this post and transferred to the Führerreserve.

On 26 June 1942, Hilpert became acting commander of the LIX Corps and in July took over the command of XXIII Corps with which he fought against the Soviet Operation Mars. On 20 January 1943, he became Commanding General of LIV Corps, which was deployed under the 18th Army of Army Group North before Leningrad and was involved in major defensive battles during Operation Iskra. In the following summer 1943 too, he proved himself in further defensive battles in the Fifth Sinyavino Offensive, for which he was later awarded the Knight's Cross of the Iron Cross on 22 August 1943.

From 31 October 1943, he briefly commanded the XXVI Corps off Leningrad before taking over I Corps in the area of the 16th Army fighting in the Newel area on 1 January 1944. As part of the Soviet winter offensive (Leningrad–Novgorod Offensive), Hilpert's troops got into heavy fighting, and Hilpert himself fell out. In July 1944, during the battles that followed the start of the Soviet summer offensive Operation Bagration, Hilpert's men fought their way out of the Polotsk Fortress. For this achievement he received the oak leaves for the Knight's Cross on 8 August 1944.

During the last stages of World War II, Hilpert commanded the German troops which had been surrounded by the Red Army in the Courland Pocket. On 7 May 1945, Karl Dönitz, in his capacity as head of state, ordered Hilpert to surrender Army Group Courland. Hilpert was the army group's last commander-in-chief. Hilpert surrendered himself, his personal staff, and three divisions of the XXXVIII Corps to Soviet Marshal Leonid Govorov. Hilpert sent the following message to his troops:

To all ranks! Marshal Govorod [sic] has agreed to a cease-fire beginning at 14:00 hours on 8 May. Troops to be informed immediately. White flags to be displayed. Commander expects loyal implementation of order, on which the fate of all Courland troops depends.

He was taken prisoner by the Soviets and died in custody in 1947.

== Command history ==
- Acting General Officer Commanding - LIX Corps - 1942
- General Officer Commanding - XXIII Corps - 1942 to 1943
- General Officer Commanding - LIV Corps - 1943
- General Officer Commanding - XXVI Corps - 1943
- General Officer Commanding - I Corps - 1 January to 20 January 1944
- General Officer Commanding - I Corps - 1 May to 1 August 1944
- Acting General Officer Commanding - 16th Army, Eastern Front - 1944 to 1945
- Acting Commander-in-Chief - Army Group North, Eastern Front - 1945
- Acting Commander-in-Chief - Army Group Courland, Eastern Front - 1945
- General Officer Commanding - 16th Army, Eastern Front - 1945
- Commander-in-Chief - Army Group Courland, Eastern Front - 15 March to 8 May 1945
- Prisoner of war - 1945 to 1947

== Awards and decorations ==
- Iron Cross (1914) 2nd Class (7 October 1914) & 1st Class (18 October 1916)
- Clasp to the Iron Cross (1939) 2nd Class (20 April 1940) & 1st Class (16 June 1940)
- German Cross in Gold on 19 February 1943 as General der Infanterie and commanding general of the XXIII Armeekorps
- Knight's Cross of the Iron Cross with Oak Leaves
  - Knight's Cross on 22 August 1943 as General der Infanterie and commander of the LIV. Armeekorps
  - Oaks Leaves on 8 August 1944 as General der Infanterie and commander of the I. Armeekorps

Military offices
Preceded by General der Infanterie Kurt von der Chevallerie	Commander of LIX. Armeekorps; 26 June 1942 - 25 July 1942	Succeeded by General der Infanterie Kurt von der Chevallerie
Preceded by General der Infanterie Albrecht Schubert	Commander of XXIII. Armeekorps; 25 July 1942 – 19 January 1943	Succeeded by Generaloberst Johannes Frießner
Preceded by General der Kavallerie Erick Hansen	Commander of LIV. Armeekorps; 20 January 1943 - 1 August 1943	Succeeded by General der Infanterie Otto Sponheimer
Preceded by General der Infanterie Ernst von Leyser	Commander of XXVI. Armeekorps; 31 October 1943 - 1 January 1944	Succeeded by General der Infanterie Martin Grase
Preceded by General der Infanterie Martin Grase	Commander of I. Armeekorps; 1 January 1944-20 January 1944	Succeeded by General der Artillerie Walter Hartmann
Preceded by General der Artillerie Walter Hartmann	Commander of I. Armeekorps; 1 May 1944-1 August 1944	Succeeded by General der Infanterie Theodor Busse
Preceded by General der Infanterie Paul Laux	Commander of 16. Armee; 3 September 1944 – 10 March 1945	Succeeded by General der Infanterie Ernst-Anton von Krosigk
Preceded by General Lothar Rendulic	Commander of Army Group Courland; 25 March 1945-8 May 1945	Succeeded by none
