= Curt Siewert =

WW2 German army general (1899-1983)

- Born: 5 April 1899
- Died: 13 June 1983 (aged 84)
- Military career
- Allegiance: Nazi Germany; West Germany
- Branch: Army; Bundeswehr
- Rank: Generalleutnant (Wehrmacht); Generalmajor (Bundeswehr)
- Commands: 58th Infantry Division
- Conflicts: World War II
- Awards: Knight's Cross of the Iron Cross

Curt Siewert (5 April 1899 – 13 June 1983) was a general in the Wehrmacht of Nazi Germany during World War II and later served in the Bundeswehr of West Germany. He was awarded the Knight's Cross of the Iron Cross of Nazi Germany. He joined the Bundeswehr in 1956 and retired in 1960.

== Awards and decorations ==
- Knight's Cross of the Iron Cross on 29 February 1944 as Generalmajor and commander of 58. Infanterie-Division

Military offices
Preceded by General der Artillerie Wilhelm Berlin	Commander of 58. Infanterie-Division; 7 June 1943 – 13 January 1945	Succeeded by Oberst Fritz Klasing
