= Erik Hansen (general) =

Erik Oskar Hansen
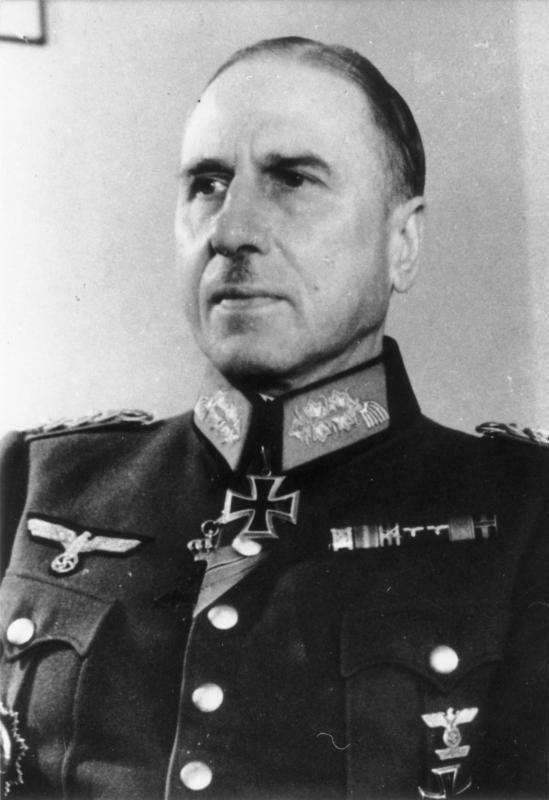
- Born: 27 May 1889; Hamburg, German Empire
- Died: 18 March 1967 (aged 77); Hamburg, West Germany
- Military career
- Allegiance: German Empire (to 1918); Weimar Republic (to 1933); Nazi Germany
- Branch: Imperial German Army; Reichswehr; Army (Wehrmacht)
- Service years: 1907–1945
- Rank: General of the Cavalry
- Commands: 4th Infantry Division; 14th Panzer Division; LIV Army Corps
- Conflicts: World War II: Invasion of Poland; Battle of France; Operation Barbarossa; Jassy–Kishinev Offensive
- Awards: Knight's Cross of the Iron Cross; German Cross in gold

Erik Oskar Hansen (27 May 1889 – 18 March 1967) was a German general in the Wehrmacht during World War II. He was a recipient of the Knight's Cross of the Iron Cross of Nazi Germany.

== Biography ==
Born in Hamburg, Hansen entered the army of Imperial Germany in 1907 as a Fahnenjunker (officer cadet) in the 9th Dragoons. He served in World War I and was awarded the Iron Cross, 1st and 2nd class, and the Hanseatic Cross of Hamburg. At the end of the war, he was an Hauptmann serving as a general staff officer to Army Group Dallwitz. He remained in the post-war Reichswehr as a career officer. He commanded army regiments from 1934 to 1936, and then served on the army general staff (OKH) from 1936 to 1938. He was given command of the 4th Infantry Division in November 1938. Promoted to Generalleutnant (Note: In the Wehrmacht, the rank of Generalleutnant is equivalent to that of major general in the United States Army.) in August 1939, he led the division through the invasion of Poland and the French Campaign before it was withdrawn from the front in August 1940 for conversion to armour. Now designated the 14th Panzer Division, Hansen oversaw its initial training in armoured warfare.

Hansen was promoted to General der Kavallerie (General of the Cavalry) (Note: Equivalent to a lieutenant general in the United States Army.) before taking command of LIV Army Corps in 1941, operating on the Eastern Front. Soon afterwards, on 4 September 1941, he was awarded the Knight's Cross of the Iron Cross. On 19 September 1942, he was awarded the German Cross in gold. In 1943, he commanded the German Military Mission in Romania in addition to being Military Commander, Romania.

On 25 August 1944, after King Michael's Coup, he was arrested by Romanian troops and held at the German Legation in Bucharest. He was taken by Soviet troops on 2 September 1944 together with the other captured German generals. He was held in the Soviet Union until 1955. On his return to Germany, he lived in Hamburg.

== Notes ==
Footnotes

Citations

Military offices
Preceded by Generalleutnant Erich Raschick	Commander of 4th Infantry Division; 10 November 1938 – 15 August 1940	Succeeded by Renamed 14th Panzer Division
Preceded by Previously 4th Infantry Division	Commander of 14th Panzer Division; 15 August 1940 – 1 October 1940	Succeeded by Generalleutnant Heinrich von Prittwitz und Gaffron
Preceded by None	Commander of LIV Army Corps; 1 June 1941 – 19 January 1943	Succeeded by Generaloberst Carl Hilpert
