= Martin Grase =

WW2 German Army general (1891-1963)

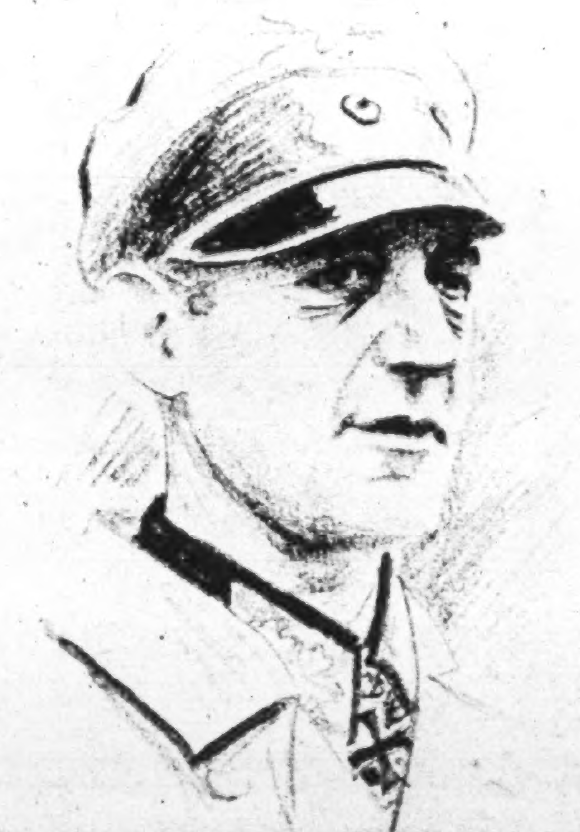
- Born: 3 May 1891; Schlochau
- Died: 3 August 1963 (aged 72); Freiburg
- Military career
- Allegiance: German Empire; Weimar Republic; Nazi Germany
- Branch: German Army
- Service years: 1909–1945
- Rank: General der Infanterie
- Commands: 1st Infantry Division; I Army Corps; XXVI Army Corps
- Conflicts: World War I; World War II; Invasion of Poland; Battle of France; Operation Barbarossa; Siege of Leningrad
- Awards: Knight's Cross of the Iron Cross with Oak Leaves

Martin Grase (3 May 1891 – 3 August 1963) was a German general during World War II. He was a recipient of the Knight's Cross of the Iron Cross with Oak Leaves of Nazi Germany.

== Awards and decorations ==
- Iron Cross (1914) 2nd Class (28 September 1914) & 1st Class (6 December 1916)
- Clasp to the Iron Cross (1939) 2nd Class (24 September 1939) & 1st Class (5 July 1940)
- Knight's Cross of the Iron Cross with Oak Leaves
  - Knight's Cross on 18 October 1941 as Oberst and commander of Infanterie-Regiment 1
  - Oak Leaves on 23 May 1943 as Generalleutnant and commander of 1. Infanterie Division

Military offices
Preceded by Generalleutnant Philipp Kleffel	Commander of 1. Infanterie-Division; 16 January 1942 - 1 July 1943	Succeeded by Generalleutnant Ernst-Anton von Krosigk
Preceded by General der Infanterie Otto Wöhler	Commander of I. Armeekorps; 15 August 1943 - 31 December 1943	Succeeded by General der Infanterie Carl Hilpert
Preceded by General der Infanterie Carl Hilpert	Commander of XXVI. Armeekorps; 1 January 1944 - 15 February 1944	Succeeded by General der Infanterie Anton Grasser
