= XXIII Army Corps (Wehrmacht) =

XXIII. Armeekorps
- Active: March 1939 – 8 May 1945
- Country: Nazi Germany
- Branch: Army
- Size: Corps
- Engagements: World War II: Battle of France; Operation Barbarossa; Battle of Smolensk (1941); Battle of Moscow; Battles of Rzhev; Battle of Kursk; Battle of Smolensk (1943); Operation Bagration; Lublin–Brest Offensive; East Pomeranian Offensive

Commanders
- Notable commanders: Carl Hilpert; Johannes Frießner

German XXIII. Corps (XXIII. Armeekorps) was a corps in the German Army during World War II.

== Commanders ==
- Infantry General (General der Infanterie) Erich Raschick, April 1939 – 26 October 1939
- Infantry General (General der Infanterie) Albrecht Schubert, 26 October 1939 – 25 July 1942
- Infantry General (General der Infanterie) Carl Hilpert, 25 July 1942 – 19 January 1943
- Colonel-General (Generaloberst) Johannes Frießner, 19 January 1943 – 7 December 1943
- Panzer General (General der Panzertruppe) Hans Freiherr von Funck, 7 December 1943 – 2 February 1944
- Pioneer General (General der Pioniere) Otto Tiemann, 2 February 1944 – 12 October 1944
- Infantry General (General der Infanterie) Walter Melzer, 12 October 1944 – 8 May 1945

== Area of operations ==
- West Wall – September 1939 – June 1941
- Eastern Front, central sector – June 1941 – May 1945

== See also ==
- List of German corps in World War II
