= Wilhelm Berlin =

German general (1889–1987)

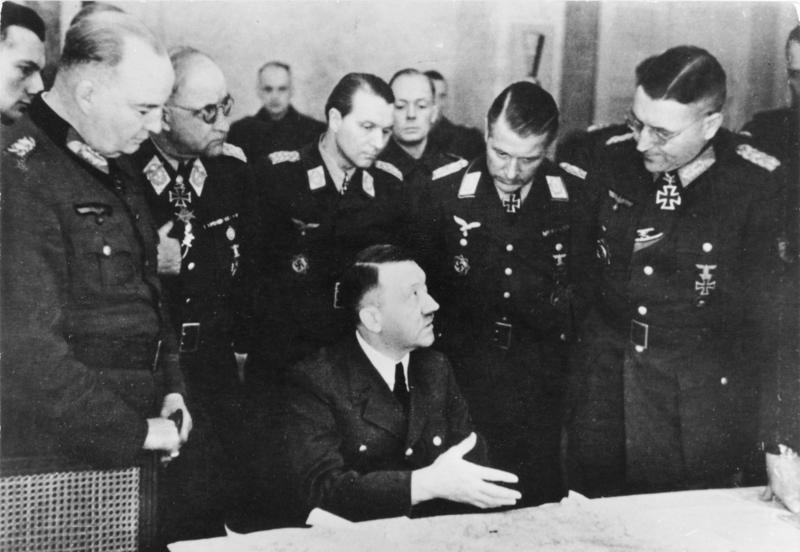
- Last front visit of Adolf Hitler on 3 March 1945. Berlin is the extreme left.
- Born: 28 April 1889; Cologne
- Died: 15 September 1987 (aged 98); Hamburg
- Military career
- Allegiance: German Empire; Weimar Republic; Nazi Germany
- Branch: Army (Wehrmacht)
- Service years: 1909–1945
- Rank: General of the Artillery
- Commands: 58th Infantry Division; 227th Infantry Division; XXVI Army Corps; CI Army Corps
- Conflicts: World War I World War II: Battle of France; Siege of Leningrad; Battle of Narva (1944); Battle of the Seelow Heights
- Awards: Knight's Cross of the Iron Cross

Wilhelm Berlin (28 April 1889 – 15 September 1987) was a German general during World War II. He was also a recipient of the Knight's Cross of the Iron Cross of Nazi Germany.

== Awards and decorations ==
- Knight's Cross of the Iron Cross on 6 March 1944 as Generalleutnant and commander of the 227. Infanterie-Division

Military offices
Preceded by Generalleutnant Karl von Graffen	Commander of 58. Infanterie-Division; 1 May 1943 – 7 June 1943	Succeeded by Generalleutnant Curt Siewert
Preceded by General der Artillerie Friedrich von Scotti	Commander of 227. Infanterie-Division; 7 June 1943 – 11 May 1944	Succeeded by Generalmajor der Reserve Maximilian Wengler
Preceded by General der Infanterie Anton Grasser	Commander of XXVI. Armeekorps; 11 May 1944 – 15 June 1944	Succeeded by General der Infanterie Anton Grasser
Preceded by None	Commander of CI. Armeekorps; 9 February 1945 – 18 April 1945	Succeeded by Generalleutnant Friedrich Sixt
