= German military mission in Romania =

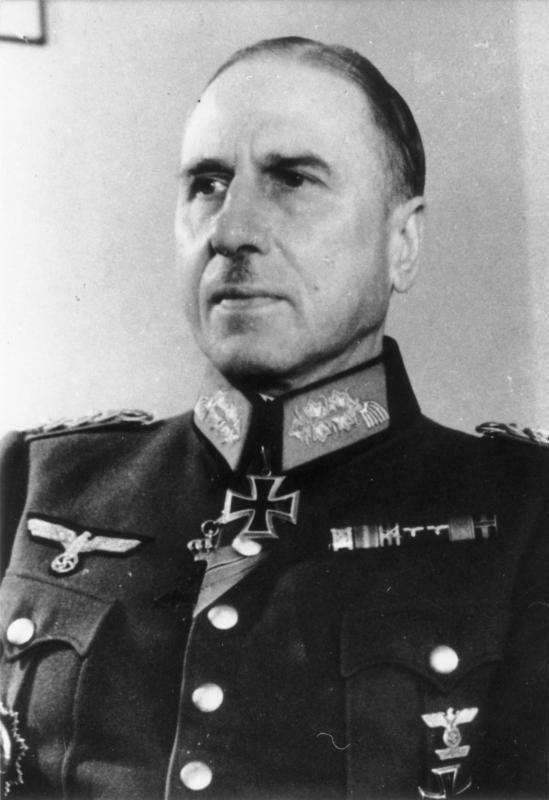
Erik Hansen, head of the military mission

The German Military Mission in Romania (German: Deutsche Heeresmission in Rumänien; Romanian: Misiunea Militară Germană în România) was a mission led by lieutenant general Erik Hansen, and sent from Nazi Germany to help Romania during World War II. German officers and aviators trained and supported the Romanian army from October 1940 to August 1944.

== See also ==
- Germany–Romania relations
- Romania during World War II

== Bibliography ==
- Alexandru Oșca, Gheorghe Nicolescu, Tratate, convenții militare și protocoale secrete. 1934-1939, Editura Vlasie, 1994, ISBN 973-96409-6-6
- Savu, Al. G., Dictatura regală, Editura Politicii, București, 1970, p. 389
- Relațiile militare româno-germane (1939-1944), Editura Europa Nova, București, 2000, p. 25.
