= Friedrich Altrichter =

German general (1890–1948)

Friedrich Altrichter (3 September 1890 – 10 December 1948) was a German officer, last in the rank of Generalleutnant of the Wehrmacht. He was also an influential military writer and military instructor at the Dresden military academy from 1936 to 1939. He was a divisional commander during World War II. Notable divisional command posts held by Altrichter included the 1st, 58th and 154th Infantry Divisions.

== Life ==
Friedrich Altrichter was born on 3 September 1890 in Berlin.

Altrichter joined the German Army in March 1910 at the age of 19 and joined the Grenadier Regiment König Friedrich Wilhelm II at the rank of Fahnenjunker. He served as an adjutant and then a staff officer during World War I. He held assignments at the 99th Reserve Infantry Brigade, Reserve Infantry Regiment 230 and 50th Reserve Division.

After Germany's defeat in the First World War, Altrichter continued to serve in the Weimar Republic's Reichswehr. During this time, he also began his activity as a military author. In March 1934, about a year after Adolf Hitler took power, he became a battalion commander at the 9th Prussian Infantry Regiment in Potsdam. His adjutants included, among others, Henning von Tresckow and Wolf Graf von Baudissin.

In 1936, the year after the redesignation of the German forces as Wehrmacht, he attained a doctorate from Heidelberg University before going on to serve as a military instructor at the military academy in Dresden. He attained his first military command with the Wehrmacht when he became the commander of Infantry Regiment 54 in 1938.

At the beginning of World War II, he served as commander of Infantry Regiment 188 under 68th Infantry Division. From January 1940 to March 1941, he served as a military instructor for infantry in the Führerreserve. In July 1941, he became commander of the 1st Infantry Division. He commanded the 58th Infantry Division from September 1941 to April 1942 and was awarded the German Cross in gold on 23 January 1942. After another brief stay in the Führerreserve, Altrichter became commander of the 154th Division.

The 154th Infantry Division was overrun by the Red Army at Oderberg on 17 April 1945. Altrichter was reassigned as commander Feldausbildungskorps Mitte and was captured in May 1945 during the Battle of Prague.

Altrichter was interned at Voikovo prison camp in 1945. There, he came into contact with officers aligned with the pro-Soviet National Committee for a Free Germany, but did ultimately not join them. He died of heart failure on 10 December 1948 in Bedaik prison camp in the Kazakh SSR.

== Writings ==
- Die kampfbereite Kompanie. Praktische Anleitung für die Gefechtsausbildung (1929).
- Die seelischen Kräfte des deutschen Heeres im Frieden und im Weltkriege (1933). Dissertation for Heidelberg University in 1936.
- Das Wesen der soldatischen Erziehung (1935).
- Der Offizier des Beurlaubtenstandes. Handbuch für den Offizier und Offiziersanwärter des Beurlaubtenstandes aller Waffen (1935).
- Der Soldatische Führer (1938).
- Verinnerlichtes Soldatentum. Beiträge zur soldatischen Erziehung (1938). With Friedrich von Cochenhausen, Wilhelm Dieckmann, and Eberhard Kessel.
