= 58th Infantry Division (Wehrmacht) =

- 58. Infanterie-Division
- Active: 26 August 1939 – April 1945
- Country: Nazi Germany
- Branch: Army
- Type: Infantry
- Size: Division
- Engagements: World War II: Battle of France; Operation Barbarossa; Demyansk Pocket; Battle of Narva (1944)

The 58th Infantry Division (German: 58. Infanterie-Division) was a unit of the German Army (Wehrmacht) during World War II. It was formed in 1939, took part in the Battle of France in 1940, and then Operation Barbarossa in 1941. The 58th was then constantly engaged on the Eastern Front until the end of the war in 1945.

== Formation ==
The 58th Infantry formed in Wehrkreis X, as part of the general expansion of the Wehrmacht upon the declaration of war. Composed of reservists, including initially many World War I veterans and a small active cadre supplied by regular Divisions, it was speedily dispatched to the French border on a defensive mission. Meanwhile, it was training younger troops, who had been called up at the outbreak of war, in its home area around Lüneburg in Northern Germany.

== Organisation ==
1939	1944
Infantry-Regiment 154; Infantry-Regiment 209; Infantry-Regiment 220	Grenadier-Regiment 154; Grenadier-Regiment 209
	Divisions-Fusilier-Bataillon 58
Artillery-Regiment 158
Pionier-Bataillon 158
Anti-tank battalion 158	Tank Destroyer Battalion 158
Reconnaissance-Battalion 158	
Field-replacement-Battalion 158	
Infanterie-Divisions-Signal-Battalion 158
Infanterie-Divisions-Nachschubführer 158	Divisions-Supply-Regiment 158

== Combat History ==
The Division first saw combat in the West. From 10 May 1940 to 25 June 1940 it participated in the Battle of France, after which it served as part as of the German occupying forces in Belgium, until 20 April 1941.

In late April the 58th was transferred east where troops of the division assembled in East Prussia ready for the start of the campaign against the Soviet Union. Attacking with Army Group North the 58th Infantry Division penetrated as far as Leningrad where the front lines stabilised into trench warfare. This was followed by two and a half years of defensive fighting on the Volkhov, around the Demyansk Pocket, at Krassny boron, at Mga, at Newel, Strugi Krassnyje.

At the beginning of October 1943, the 58th division is pulled out of siege lines around Leningrad, and embarked on trains to the south. With German intelligence observing signs of Russian preparations for an offensive on the army group boundary, the division is switched to the 16th Army reserve. However the timing and intensity of the Soviet attack still caught German command by surprise and by 6 October four Soviet armies capture significant transport hub of the city of Nevel, with only the first elements of 58 only just arriving in the region. The 58th infantry division is put into action on the northern flank of the breakthrough as the Russians continue to attempt to expand their offensive. The Soviet armies continue to chip away in the Nevel area, into January 1944 without ever completely breaking through as the Germans bring up just enough reinforcements to stop them.

The division was again taken from the front and this time rushed north when the red army finally cracked the siege lines around Leningrad. Partially committed near Luga, 2 infantry regiments had to be rescued from encirclement. The division was then shifted further north and fought in the Battle of Narva (1944).

The division ended the year trapped in a small bridgehead around Memel, with their only option was to retreat down the Spit towards Konigsburg. There the last soldiers of the division under Colonel Eggemann went into Soviet captivity.

== Noteworthy individuals ==
=== Commanders ===
- Generalleutnant Iwan Heunert, 26 August 1939 – 4 September 1941
- Generalleutnant Dr. Friedrich Altrichter, 4 September 1941 – 2 April 1942
- Generalleutnant Karl von Graffen, 2 April 1942 – 1 May 1943
- General der Artillerie Wilhelm Berlin, 1 May 1943 – 7 June 1943
- Generalleutnant Curt Siewert, 7 June 1943 – 13 April 1945
- Oberst Fritz Klasing, 13 April 1945 – May 1945

=== Others ===
- Siegfried Westphal, operations officer of 58th Infantry Division in 1939; later became one of the youngest German generals of World War II.
- William Lubbeck (Born Heinrich Friedrich Wilhelm Lübbecke) 17 June 1921 - 22 June 2021), the Author of At Leningrad's Gates - The Story of a Soldier with Army Group North, served in the 154th Regiment of the 58th Division from 1940-45, seeing extensive combat in all the Division's major engagements as an Artillery Observer NCO, promoted to a Platoon Commander and ending the war as a Company Commander. He was awarded the Iron Cross First and Second Class, the Infantry Assault Badge and the Wound Badge. He immigrated to Canada in the early 1950's and then America, becoming a Citizen in 1961.
