= Red Army strategic operations in World War II =

Red Army strategic operations were major military events carried out between 1941 and 1945 on the Eastern Front or in 1945 in the Far East during the Second World War. Such operations typically involved at least one front: the largest military formation of the Soviet Armed Forces. The operations could be defensive, offensive, a withdrawal, an encirclement, or a siege, always conducted by at least two services of the armed forces (the ground and air forces), and often included the navy. In most cases, the Stavka divided strategic operations into operational phases (large operations in their own right). In a few cases the phases were tactical, such as amphibious landings.

== Introduction ==
In Soviet historiography, the Great Patriotic War is divided into three periods:

1. First (22 June 1941 – 18 November 1942)
2. Second (19 November 1942 – 31 December 1943)
3. Third (1 January 1944 – 9 May 1945)

The war with Japan, the Campaign in the Far East – including the Manchurian strategic offensive operation, (9 August 1945 – 2 September 1945) – is seen as a separate theater of operations from the Great Patriotic War. During the Second World War, the Red Army carried out a number of military operations. The scope of these operations, usually known by the major cities around which they took place, was usually termed "operational-strategic" or "strategic" depending on scale. An operational-strategic operation was usually undertaken by at least a group of armies or a single front. A strategic operation usually required the cooperation of several fronts to achieve its objectives. In both cases, the operations could last from a week to several months. Strategic operations were combined into seasonal campaigns, because weather and ground conditions affected planning.

Soviet historians disagreed on which operations to classify as strategic or front-level, and operational names often differed in early military studies and later official histories. During the 1960s, 40 strategic operations were discussed; in the 1970s, this had expanded to 55. The six-volume History of the Great Patriotic War (published between 1960 and 1965) and the twelve-volume History of the Second World War 1939–1945, published between 1973 and 1982, did not specify the number of strategic operations. The Military-Historical Journal of the Ministry of Defense published discussions during 1985 and 1986 between military historians and military leaders about strategic operations. As a result of these discussions, a list of strategic operations was developed and the number of troops involved and duration of the operations were specified. This issue was not fully resolved, however, as the work of the Grigory Krivosheyev commission on Soviet casualties (published in 1993) contained a slightly different list of strategic operations.

== First period (22 June 1941 – 18 November 1942) ==
=== Summer–autumn 1941 campaign (22 June – 4 December) ===
- Axis (Operation Barbarossa)
- Baltic operation: 22 June – 9 July
  - Baltic border defensive battles: 22–24 June
    - Battle of Raseiniai
  - Šiauliai counter-offensive operation: 24–27 June
  - Riga defense (ru:Оборона Риги (1941)): 28–30 June
  - Pskov defense (ru:Оборона Пскова): 4–9 July
  - Battle of Hanbko 22 June – 2 December
- Germany Battle of Białystok-Minsk/Offensive Campaign in Belorussia: 22–29 June
- Belorussian strategic defensive (ru:Белорусская стратегическая оборонительная операция): 22 June – 9 July
- Belorussian border defensive battles: 22–25 June
  - Defense of Brest Fortress: 22–30 June
  - Battle of Vitebsk (ru:Витебское сражение): 6–16 July
  - Borisov counterattack: 6–9 July
  - Lepel Offensive Operation: 6–11 July 1941
  - Lvov-Chernovitsy strategic defensive operation (ru:Львовско-Черновицкая стратегическая оборонительная операция): 22 June – 9 July
  - Ukrainian border defensive battles: 22–27 June
    - Battle of Brody: 26–30 June
  - Lvov-Lutsk defense: 27 June – 2 July
  - Stanislav-Proskurov defense: 3–6 July
- Germany and Finland (Operation Arctic Fox): 29 June – mid-July
  - Arctic-Karelia strategic defense: 29 June – 10 October
  - Operation Silver Fox 29 June – 19 September
  - Finnish invasion of the Karelian Isthmus 29 June – 23 September
  - Kestenga defense: 1 July – 10 October
  - Finnish invasion of East Karelia 1 July – 10 October
  - Moldavian defense: 1–26 July
  - Battle of Kiev: 7 July – 26 September
  - Korosten defense: 11 July – 20 August
  - Timoshenko counteroffensive: 13 – 17 July
  - Bobruysk offensive: 13 July – 7 August
  - Novohrad-Volynskyi defense: 10 July – 20 August
  - Uman defense: 15 July – 4 August
  - Tiraspol-Melitopol defense: 27 July – 28 September
  - Kiev-Pryluky defense: 20 August – 26 September
  - Malyn offensive: 5–8 August
- Leningrad strategic defensive: 10 July – 30 September
  - Tallinn defense: 10 July – 10 August
    - Evacuation of Tallinn
  - Kingisepp–Luga defense: 10 July – 23 September
  - Soltsy-Dno offensive: 14 – 18 July
  - Staraya-Russa offensive: 12–23 August
  - Demyansk defense: 6–26 September
  - First Sinyavino offensive: 10–26 September
  - Second Sinyavino offensive: 20–28 October
- Battle of Smolensk: 10 July – 10 September
  - Polotsk defense: 2–16 July
  - Smolensk defense: 10 July – 10 August
  - Smolensk offensive: 21 July – 7 August
  - Siege of Mogilev: 3–26 July
  - Rogachev–Zhlobin offensive: 13–24 July
  - Gomel–Trubchevsk defense: 24 July – 30 August
  - Dukhovschina offensive: 17 August – 8 September
  - Yelnya offensive: 30 August – 8 September
  - Roslavl–Novozybkov offensive: 30 August – 12 September
- Odessa defense: 5 August – 16 October
- Germany (Operation Wotan): 9 September
- Donbas–Rostov strategic defensive operation: 29 September – 16 November
  - Battle of the Sea of Azov: 26 September – 11 October
  - Sumy–Kharkov defense: 30 September – 30 November
  - Defence of Kharkov: 20–24 October
  - Germany: First Battle of Kharkov
- Axis Crimean campaign: 26 September 1941 – 15 May 1942
  - Donbas defensive operation: 29 September – 4 November
  - Rostov defense: 5–16 November
- Moscow defense: 30 September – 5 December
  - Orel-Bryansk defense: 30 September – 23 October
  - Vyazma defense: 2–13 October
  - Kalinin defense: 10 October – 4 December
  - Mozhaisk-Maloyaroslavets defense: 10–30 October
  - Defense of Tula: 24 October – 5 December
  - Klin-Solnechnogorsk defense: 15 November – 5 December
  - Naro-Fominsk defense: 1–5 December
  - Tikhvin defense: 16 October – 18 November
- Crimean defense 18 October – 16 November
- Defense of Sevastopol 30 October 1941 – 4 July 1942
- Tikhvin offensive: 10 November – 30 December
  - Tikhvin-Kirishsk offensive: 12 November – 30 December
  - Malo-Vishersk offensive: 10 November – 30 December
- Rostov offensive 17 November – 2 December
  - Bolshekrepinsk offensive 17–27 November

=== 1941–1942 winter campaign (5 December 1941 – 30 April 1942) ===
- Battle of Moscow: 5 December 1941 – 7 January 1942
  - Kalinin offensive: 5 December 1941 – 7 January 1942
  - Klin–Solnechnogorsk offensive: 6–25 December 1941
  - Yelets offensive: 6–16 December 1941
  - Tula offensive: 6–16 December 1941
  - Kaluga offensive: 17 December 1941 – 5 January 1942
  - Naro–Fominsk offensive: 24 December 1941 – 8 January 1942
- Kerch–Feodosia amphibious operation 25 December 1941 – 2 January 1942
- Oboyan–Kursk offensive: 3–26 January 1942
- Battle of Lyuban: 7 January – 30 April 1942
- Demyansk offensive (first phase): 7 January – 20 May 1942
- Orel–Bolkhov offensive: 8 January – 28 April 1942
- Battles of Rzhev: 8 January – 20 April 1942
  - Sychyovka–Vyazma offensive: 8 January – 28 February 1942
  - Mozhaysk–Vyazma offensive: 10 January – 28 February 1942
  - Toropets–Kholm offensive: 9 January – 6 February 1942
  - Vyazma airborne operation: 18 January – 28 February 1942
  - Rzhev–Vyazma offensive: 3 March – 20 April 1942
  - Demyansk offensive (second phase): 7 January – 20 May 1942
- Barvenkovo–Lozovaya offensive: 18–31 January 1942
- Crimean offensive: 27 January – 15 April 1942
- Bolkhov offensive: 24 March – 3 April 1942

=== Summer–autumn 1942 campaign (1 May – 18 November) ===
- Germany: Demjansk Pocket (8 February – 21 April)
- Volkhov offensive: 24 March – 3 April 1942
- Murmansk offensive: 28 April – 13 May
- Battle of the Kerch Peninsula: 8–19 May
- Izium bridgehead offensive: 12–29 May
- Rescue of 2nd Shock Army: 13 May – 10 July
- Axis: Operation Wilhelm (10–15 June)
  - Operation Fridericus II: 22–25 June
  - Case Blue: 28 June – 19 August
    - Case Blue – Woronesh: Army Group B
    - Case Blue – Stalingrad: 6th Army
    - Case Blue – Baku: Army Group A
- Voronezh–Voroshilovgrad defense: 28 June – 24 July
  - 1st Kastornoye defense: 28 June – 10 July
  - 2nd Kastornoye defense: 9–24 July
  - Valuiki–Rossosh defense: 28 June – 24 July
  - Voroshilovgrad–Shakhty defense: 7–24 July
- Donbas defense: 7–24 July
  - Battle of Rostov: 19–24 July
- Germany: Operation Seydlitz (12 July)
- Stalingrad defense: 17 July – 18 November
  - Distant defense: 17 July – 17 August
  - Near defense: 19 August – 18 November
- First Rzhev–Sychyovka offensive: 30 July – 1 October
- Sinyavino offensive: 19 August – 10 October
- Kozelsk offensive: 22 August – 9 September
- Axis: Operation Braunschweig (began 28 June)
  - Operation Edelweiss: 23 July – 21 August
- North Caucasian defense: 25 July – 31 December
  - Tikhoretsk-Stavropol defense: 25 July – 5 August
  - Armavir-Maikop defense: 6–17 August
  - Krasnodar defense: 7–14 August
  - Novorossiysk defense: 19 August – 26 September
  - Mozdok-Malgobek defense: 1–28 September
    - 1940–1944 insurgency in Chechnya
- Axis: Operation Blücher (2 September)
  - Tuapse defense: 25 September – 20 December
  - Nalckik-Ordzhonikidze defense: 25 October – 12 November

== Second period (19 November 1942 – 31 December 1943) ==
=== 1942–1943 winter campaign (19 November 1942 – 3 March 1943) ===
- Stalingrad strategic offensive 19 November 1942 – 2 February 1943
  - Operation Uranus 19–30 November 1942
  - Kotelnikovo offensive 12–31 December 1942
    - Tatsinskaya Raid 16–28 December 1942
  - Operation Winter Storm 12–23 December 1942
  - Middle Don offensive (Operation Little Saturn) 16–30 December 1942
  - Operation Koltso (Operation Ring) 10 January – 2 February 1943
- Second Rzhev–Sychyovka offensive (Operation Mars) 25 November – 20 December 1942
  - Sychevka offensive 24 November – 14 December 1942
  - Belyi offensive 25 November – 16 December 1942
  - Luchesa offensive 25 November – 11 December 1942
  - Molodoi Tud offensive 25 November – 23 December 1942
  - Velikie-Luki offensive 24 November 1942 – 20 January 1943
- North Caucasian strategic offensive 1 January – 4 February 1943
  - Salsk-Rostov offensive (Battle of Rostov (1943)) : 1 January – 4 February 1943
  - Mozdok-Stavropol offensive : 1–24 January 1943
  - Novorossiysk-Maikop offensive : 11 January – 4 February 1943
  - Tikhoretsk-Eisk offensive : 24 January – 4 February 1943
- Axis defence of the Kuban bridgeheads
- Operation Iskra (Operation Spark, breaking of the Leningrad blockade): 12–30 January 1943
  - Krasnoborsko-Smerdynskaya offensive
- Voronezh–Kharkov offensive: 13 January – 3 March 1943
  - Ostrogozhsk–Rossosh offensive: 13–27 January 1943
  - Voronezh-Kastornoye offensive: 24 January – 2 February 1943
  - Voroshilovgrad offensive (Operation Skachok): 29 January – 18 February 1943
  - Kharkov offensive (Operation Zvezda): 2 February – 3 March 1943
  - Maloarkhangelsk offensive: 5–28 February 1943
  - Lvov offensive: 15 February – 1 March 1943
- Donbas Mariupol offensive: 16–23 February 1943
- Krasnodar offensive: 9 February – 24 May 1943
- Operation Polar Star: 10 February – 1 April 1943
  - Battle of Krasny Bor: 10–13 February 1943
  - Demyansk offensive: 15–28 February 1943
  - Staraya Russa operation: 4–19 March 1943
- Germany: Operation Büffel (1–22 March 1943)
  - Rzhev–Vyazma offensive (1943): 2–31 March 1943
- Dmitriyev-Sevsk offensive: 24 February – 28 March 1943
- Kharkov defense: 4–25 March 1943
- Germany: Third Battle of Kharkov
- 1st Taman offensive: 4 April – 10 May 1943
  - 2nd Taman offensive: 26 May 1943 – 22 August 1944

=== Summer–autumn 1943 campaign (1 July – 31 December) ===
- Germany Operation Citadel
- Kursk defense: 5–23 July
  - Orel–Kursk defense: 5–11 July
  - Belgorod–Kursk defensive: 5–23 July
- Orel offensive (Operation Kutuzov): 12 July – 18 August
  - Volkhov–Orel offensive: 12 July – 18 August
  - Kromyv–Orel offensive: 15 July – 18 August
- Donbas offensive: 17 July – 2 August
  - Izyum-Barvenkovo offensive: 17–27 July
  - Mius offensive: 17 July – 2 August
- Mga offensive (Fifth Sinyavino offensive): 22 July – 22 August
- Belgorod–Kharkov offensive operation (Operation Rumyantsev): 3–23 August
  - Belgorod–Bogodukhov offensive: 3–23 August
  - Zmiev offensive: 12–23 August
  - Mirgorod direction offensive: 3–25 August
- Smolensk strategic offensive (Operation Suvorov): 7 August – 2 October
  - Spas–Demensk offensive: 7–20 August
  - Dukhovshchina–Demidov offensive (first stage): 13–18 August
  - Yelnia–Dorogobuzh offensive: 28 August – 6 September
  - Dukhovshchina–Demidov offensive (second stage): 14 September – 2 October
  - Smolensk–Roslavl offensive: 15 September – 2 October
  - Bryansk offensive: 17 August – 3 October
- Donbas strategic offensive (August 1943): 13 August – 22 September
  - Barvenkov-Pavlograd offensive: 13 August – 22 September
  - Mius–Mariupol offensive: 18 August – 22 September
- Chernigov-Poltava offensive: 26 August – 30 September
  - Chernigov-Pripyat offensive: 26 August – 30 September
  - Sumy–Priluky offensive: 26 August – 30 September
  - Poltava-Kremenchug offensive: 26 August – 30 September
- Novorossiysk-Taman operation: 10 September – 9 October
  - Novorossiysk amphibious operation: 10–16 September
  - Taman offensive: 10 September – 9 October
- Second Mga offensive: 15–18 September
- Operation Concert (partisan offensive in support of Operation Suvorov): 19 September
- Lower Dnieper offensive: 26 September – 20 December
  - Axis Defence of the Panther–Wotan line
  - Kremenchug offensive 26 September – 10 October
  - Melitopol offensive: 26 September – 5 November
  - Zaporizhia offensive: 10–14 October
  - Kremenchug-Pyatikhatki offensive: 15 October – 3 November
  - Dnepropetrovsk offensive: 23 October – 23 December
  - Krivoi Rog offensive: 14–21 November
  - Apostolovo offensive: 14 November – 23 December
  - Nikopol offensive: 14 November – 31 December
  - Aleksandriia–Znamenka offensive: 22 November – 9 December
  - Krivoi Rog offensive: 10–19 December
- Battle of Kiev: 1–24 October
  - Chernobyl–Radomysl offensive: 1–4 October
  - Chernobyl–Gornostaipol defense: 3–8 October
  - Lyutezh offensive: 11–24 October
  - First Bukrin offensive: 12–15 October
  - Second Bukrin offensive: 21–24 October
- Byelorussian offensive: 3–31 December
  - First Gomel–Rechitsa offensive: 30 September – 30 October
  - Nevel offensive: 3–12 October
  - First Orsha offensive: 3–26 October
  - Battle of Lenino: 12–13 October
  - Vitebsk (Riga) offensive: 18–30 October
  - Idritsa offensive: 18–30 October
  - Pskov offensive: 18–30 October
  - Polotsk–Vitebsk offensive: 2–21 November
  - Pustoshka-Idritsa offensive: 2–21 November
  - Second Gomel-Rechitsa offensive: 10–30 November
  - Second Orsha offensive: 14 November – 5 December
  - Novyi Bykhov–Propoisk offensive: 22–30 November
  - Kalinkovichi offensive: 8–11 December
  - Gorodok offensive: 13–31 December
  - Idritsa-Opochka offensive: 16 December 1943 – 15 January 1944
  - Kalinkovichi defensive: 20–27 December
- Kerch–Eltigen operation: 31 October – 11 December
- Second Battle of Kiev (offensive): 3–13 November
  - Defense: 13 November – 22 December

== Third period (1 January 1944 – 9 May 1945) ==
=== Winter-spring 1944 campaign (1 January – 31 May) ===
- Dnieper–Carpathian offensive: 24 December 1943 – 17 April 1944
  - Zhitomir–Berdichev offensive: 24 December 1943 – 14 January 1944
  - Kirovograd offensive: 5–16 January
  - Korsun–Shevchenkovsky offensive: 24 January – 17 February
  - Germany: Korsun–Cherkassy pocket
  - Rovno–Lutsk offensive (first stage): 27 January – 11 February
  - Nikopol–Krivoi Rog offensive (second stage): 30 January – 29 February
  - Proskurov–Chernovtsy offensive: 4 March – 17 April
  - Uman–Botoşani offensive: 5 March 1944 – 17 April
  - Bereznegovatoye–Snigirevka offensive: 6–18 March
  - Polesskoe offensive: 15 March – 5 April
  - Odessa offensive: 26 March – 14 April
- Kalinkovichi-Mozyr offensive: 8–30 January
  - Ozarichi-Ptich offensive: 16–30 January
- Vitebsk offensive: 3 February – 13 March
- Leningrad–Novgorod strategic offensive: 14 January – 1 March
  - Krasnoye Selo–Ropsha offensive: 14–30 January
  - Novgorod–Luga offensive: 14 January – 15 February
  - Kingisepp–Gdov offensive: 1 February – 1 March
  - Staraya Russa-Novorzhev offensive: 18 February – 1 March
- Germany: Battle of Narva (2 February – 10 August)
  - Battle for Narva Bridgehead: 2 February – 26 July
- Narva offensive (15–28 February 1944)
- Rogachev–Zhlobin offensive: 21–26 February
- Narva offensive (1–4 March 1944)
- Narva offensive (18–24 March 1944)
- Crimean offensive: 8 April – 12 May
  - Perekop–Sevastopol offensive: 8 April – 12 May
  - Kerch–Sevastopol offensive: 11 April – 12 May
- First Jassy–Kishinev offensive: 8 April – 6 June
  - First Battle of Târgu Frumos : 9–12 April
  - Battle of Podu Iloaiei: 12 April
  - Second Battle of Târgu Frumos: 2–8 May

=== Summer–autumn 1944 campaign (1 June – 31 December) ===
- Vyborg–Petrozavodsk offensive: 10 June – 9 August
  - Vyborg offensive: 10–20 June
  - Koivisto landing operation: 20–25 June
  - Battle of Tienhaara: 22 June
  - Battle of Tali-Ihantala: 25 June – 9 July
  - Battle of Vyborg Bay: 30 June – 10 July
  - Battle of Vuosalmi: 4–17 July
  - Svir–Petrozavodsk offensive: 21 June – 9 August
    - Tuloksinskaia landing offensive: 23–27 June
    - Battle of Nietjärvi: 15–17 July
    - Battle of Ilomantsi: 6 July – 13 August
- Operation Bagration: 23 June – 29 August
  - Vitebsk–Orsha offensive: 23–28 June
  - Mogilev offensive: 23–28 June
  - Bobruysk offensive: 24–29 June
  - Polotsk offensive: 29 June – 4 July
  - Minsk offensive: 29 June – 4 July
  - Vilnius offensive: 5–20 July
  - Šiauliai offensive: 5–31 July
  - Belostock offensive: 5–27 July
  - Lublin–Brest offensive: 18 July – 2 August
    - Battle of Radzymin
  - Kaunas offensive: 28 July – 28 August
  - Osovets offensive: 6–14 August
- Rezhitsa–Dvinsk offensive: 10–27 July
- Pskov–Ostrov offensive: 11–31 July
- Germany: Operation Doppelkopf (16–27 August)
- Lemberg–Sandomierz strategic offensive: 13 July – 29 August
  - Lvov offensive: 13–27 July
  - Stanislav offensive: 13–27 July
  - Sandomierz offensive: 28 July – 29 August
- Narva offensive: 24–30 July
- Germany: Battle of Tannenberg Line (26 July – 10 August)
- Madona offensive: 1–28 August
- Tartu offensive: 10 August – 6 September
- Second Jassy–Kishinev offensive: 20–29 August
  - Yassi–Focsani offensive: 20–29 August
  - Kishinev–Izmail offensive: 20–29 August
- Bucharest–Arad offensive: 30 August – 3 October
- East Carpathian offensive: 8–28 September
  - Carpathian-Uzhgorod offensive: 9–28 September
- Baltic offensive: 14 September – 24 November

Riga offensive 14 September – 24 October 1944
Tallinn offensive 17–26 September 1944
Moonsund landing 5–22 October 1944
Memel offensive 27 September – 24 November 1944

- Courland Pocket 9 October 1944 – 8 May 1945
- Belgrade offensive 14 September – 24 November 1944
  - Niš operation 8–14 October 1944
  - Battle of Batina 11–29 November 1944
- Debrecen offensive 6–28 October 1944
- Petsamo–Kirkenes strategic offensive 7–29 October 1944
- Goldap-Gumbinnen offensive 16–30 October 1944
- Budapest strategic offensive 29 October 1944 – 13 February 1945

Kecskemét-Budapest offensive 29 October – 10 December 1944
Szolnok–Budapest offensive 29 October – 10 December 1944
Nyiregyhaza–Miskolc offensive 1 November – 10 December 1944
Apatin-Kaposvár offensive (ru) : 7 November – 31 December 1944
Esztergom–Komarno offensive 20 December 1944 – 15 January 1945
Szekesfehervar–Esztergom offensive 20 December 1944 – 13 February 1945
Assault on Budapest 27 December 1944 – 13 February 1945
German: Operation Konrad : 1–27 January 1945

=== Campaign in Europe 1945 (1 January – 9 May) ===
- Vistula-Oder strategic offensive 12 January – 3 February
  - Warsaw-Posen offensive: 14 January – 23 February
  - Sandomierz–Silesian offensive: 12 January – 3 February
  - Western Carpathian offensive: 12 January – 18 February
  - Kosice–Poprad offensive: 12–28 January
  - Bel'sk offensive: 29 January – 18 February
  - Pleshevets–Breznovsk offensive: 12 January – 18 February
- East Prussian offensive: 13 January – 25 April
  - Insterburg–Königsberg offensive: 14–26 January
  - Milau–Elbing offensive: 14–26 January
  - Rastenburg–Heilsberg offensive: 27 January – 12 February
  - Braunsberg offensive: 13–22 March
    - Germany: Heiligenbeil Pocket
  - Königsberg offensive: 6–9 April
  - Samland offensive: 13–25 April
- Lower Silesian offensive: 8–24 February
  - Germany: Siege of Breslau (13 February – 6 May)
- East Pomeranian offensive: 10 February – 6 March
  - Konitz-Köslin offensive operation: 10 February – 6 March
  - German counteroffensive Operation Solstice: 15–18 February
  - Siege of Danzig: 7–31 March
  - Arnswalde–Kolberg offensive operation: 1–18 March
  - Altdamm offensive operation: 18 March – 4 April
- German counteroffensive in Hungary Operation Southwind: 17–24 February
- German Lake Balaton counteroffensive Operation Spring Awakening: 6–16 March
- Balaton defense: 6–15 March
  - Bulgarian Battle of the Transdanubian Hills: 6–21 March
- Moravia-Ostrava offensive: 10 March – 5 May
- Vienna offensive: 13 March – 15 April
  - Győr offensive: 13 March – 4 April
  - Veszprem offensive: 16–25 March
  - Sopron–Baden offensive: 26 March – 4 April
  - Nagykanizsa–Körmend offensive: 26 March – 15 April
  - Assault on Vienna: 4–13 April
- Upper Silesian offensive: 15–31 March
- Bratislava–Brno offensive: 25 March – 5 May
- Graz–Amstetten offensive: 15 April – 9 May
- Berlin offensive: 16 April – 8 May
  - German Defence of the Oder–Neisse Line
  - Stettin–Rostock offensive: 16 April – 8 May
  - German Defense of Schwedt Bridgehead: 1 February – 3 March
  - Seelow-Berlin offensive: 16 April – 2 May
    - Battle of Halbe: 24 April – 1 May
  - Cottbus–Potsdam offensive: 16 April – 8 May
  - Spremberg–Torgau offensive: 16 April – 5 May
    - Battle of Bautzen: 21–30 April
  - Brandenberg–Rathenow offensive: 3–8 May
- Prague offensive: 6–11 May
  - Sudeten offensive: 6–11 May
  - Olomouc offensive: 6–9 May
  - Iglau–Beneschau offensive: 6–11 May
- Landing at Bornholm: 7 May

== See also ==
- List of military operations on the Eastern Front of World War II
- Winter campaign of 1941–1942
