= Battle of Nurunyu =

1917 Battle

- Part of East African Campaign
Date	18 August 1917
Location	Nurunyu, north of Lindi, German East Africa
Result	British victory

Belligerents
United Kingdom: British East Africa	German Empire: German East Africa

Commanders and leaders
General C.O'Grady; Colonel Taylor	Friedrich-Wilhelm von Chappuis Major Rothe

Units involved
(United Kingdom) 25th Fusiliers (East Africa Protectorate) 1/2 KAR	(German East Africa) Abteilung Rothe (German East Africa) Abteilung von Chappuis

Strength
560–600 British; 600 Askaris	90–105 Germans; 720 Askaris

Casualties and losses
13 killed and 51 wounded	-210–226 killed and wounded

The Battle of Nurunyu took place on 18 August, 1917, in German East Africa during the First World War between the British East Africa and the Schutztruppe.

== Background ==
Following the inconclusive action at Tandamuti on 3 August, the Allied British Forces in the north of Lindi, which include the King's African Rifles and the 25th Fusiliers, regrouped and advanced again on 10 August. The German forces had abandoned Tandamuti Hill and retired to new strongly defended positions at Nurunyu. Heavy rain over the next few days prevented any further operations against the Germans until the 17th August, when Brigadier-General O'Grady's Lindi Force received fresh instructions that once again they were to attempt to dislodge the enemy from their positions by means of outflanking and subsidiary movements.

== Battle ==
The British Forces, in a column formation under the commanded of Colonel Taylor, advanced in a column formation towards Nurunyu. The column had the 25th Frontiersmen battalion of the Royal Fusiliers and the 1/2 battalion of KAR . After their vanguard(1/2 KAR) drove towards the German patrol at 10:30 AM, and engaged with them and maintained continuous contact with the enemy as they pushed back the German left flank and drove a wedge between 19th FeldKompagnie and Tanga Kompagnie. However, as the bush grew ever thicker so as to prevent deployment and German fire increased as reinforcements from their reserve were moved forward, the decision was made to take up a defensive position. By night, as the bushes were not a suitable defensive position, the 1/2 moved back 600 yards towards the 25th and a Strokes Mortar Section. Taylor's men hastily entrenched itself and, almost immediately, faced a determined German assault on its right flank, which was repulsed, only for further fierce attacks to follow on the rear and left, reinforced by the 3rd and 11th Feldkompagnies under von Lettow‑Vorbeck himself, who maintained heavy close‑range fire. yet the British held firm in their defensive square, replying with rifles, machine guns, and mortars until well after dark, when a brief lull at 8 p.m. allowed them to catch breath before the Germans reorganised and surrounded the position, launching a surprise night attack at 9.30 p.m. marked by a shrill whistle and a sudden burst of fire from the right flank, which triggered another intense twenty‑minute firefight before the Germans withdrew, leaving the British to brace for renewed assaults, redistribute ammunition, and endure the growing hardship of thirst with no water available inside the square.

== Aftermath ==
Despite heavy fighting on 18 August, battalion losses were light one killed and four wounded, including the chaplain due to the protective dip in the ground, though the 1/2nd King's African Rifles suffered twelve dead and forty‑seven wounded. Meanwhile, the Germans had lost about 200 men. Dawn patrols found, the Germans had shifted 700 yards to new positions, allowing communications with G.H.Q. to reopen and supplies of ammunition and water to arrive, though rations remained bully beef and biscuit as fires were forbidden to avoid artillery targeting, and enemy shelling proved inaccurate in the thick bush, for four more days the force held its shallow trenches until, on 22 August, orders came to withdraw under cover of darkness, the 25th Royal Fusiliers reduced to a small machine‑gun company returning to camp to serve in reserve.
