= Leningrad strategic defensive =

1941 Soviet military operation in WWII

- Part of the Eastern Front of World War II
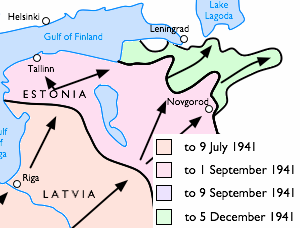
Date	10 July – 30 September 1941
Location	Pskov Oblast, Novgorod Oblast, Estonia, Leningrad Oblast, the Baltic Sea
Result	German victory: Beginning of the Siege of Leningrad

Belligerents
Germany	Soviet Union

Commanders and leaders
(Nazi Germany) Wilhelm von Leeb (Nazi Germany) G. Küchler (Nazi Germany) Ernst Busch (Nazi Germany) Erich Hoepner (Nazi Germany) G. Reinhardt (Nazi Germany) E. von Manstein	(Soviet Union) Petr Sobennikov (Soviet Union) Pavel Kurochkin (Soviet Union) Markian Popov (Soviet Union) Kliment Voroshilov (Soviet Union) Georgy Zhukov (Soviet Union) Vladimir Tributs

Units involved
(Nazi Germany) Army Group North: 4th Panzer Group; 16th Army; 18th Army	(Soviet Union) Northwestern Front (Soviet Union) Leningrad Front (from 27/8) (Soviet Union) Baltic Fleet

Strength
517,000	725,000

Casualties and losses
60,000	214,000 were killed or captured 1,492 tanks destroyed 9,889 artillery pieces lost 1,702 aircraft destroyed 733,300 small arms lost Total: 345,000 casualties

Leningrad strategic defensive operation is the term in Soviet historiography for the defensive operations in the area south of Leningrad by the Red Army and the Soviet Navy during World War II from 10 July to 30 September 1941. The following operations are considered as part of the strategic operation:

Kingisepp–Luga defensive 10 July – 23 September 1941
Soltsy–Dno offensive 14–22 July 1941
Tallinn defensive 5– 28 August 1941
Staraya–Russa offensive 8–23 August 1941
Demyansk defensive 6–26 September 1941

== Positions of the German forces at the start of the operation ==
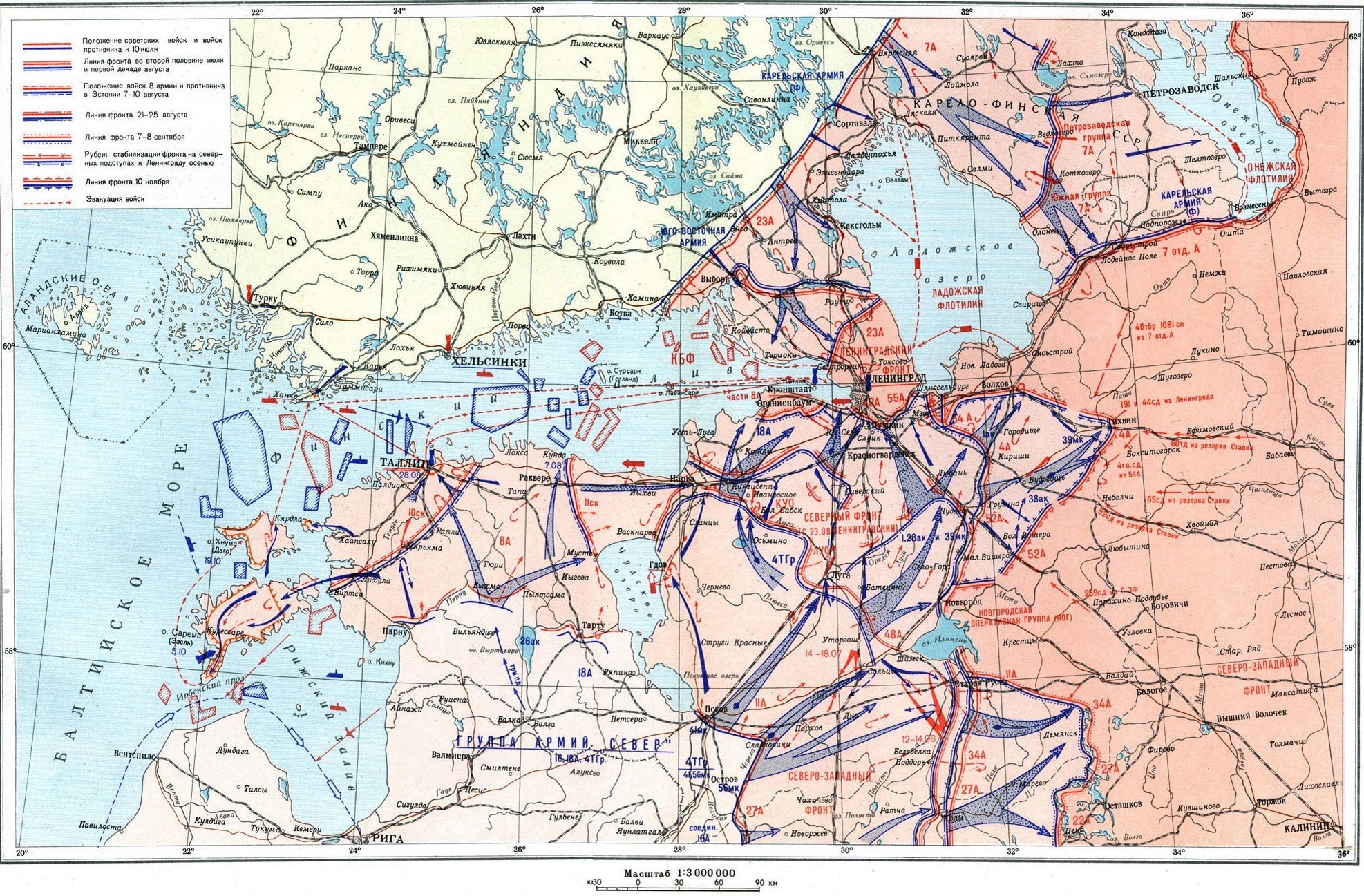
Fighting by Soviet troops on the outskirts of Leningrad. July 10 - November 10, 1941

After the start of Operation Barbarossa on 22 June 1941, the German Army Group North, consisting of the 18th, the 4th Panzer Group and 16th Armies, had made a spectacular advance through the Baltic states.

In two and a half weeks, Lithuania and Latvia had been overrun and on 9 July, the 4th Panzer Group had already reached Pskov in Russia and the southern shore of Lake Peipus, with a bulge to the north-east towards Slavkovich. On the left flank of the bulge was the XXXXI Motorized Corps and on the right the LVI Motorized Corps.

The German 18th Army had advanced along the coast and pursued the Soviet 8th Army from its position on the border. The Soviet 8th Army was able to break contact and establish new defensive lines farther to the rear of the pre-war borders. On 10 July the German 18th Army, helped by the local Forest Brothers, had entered Southern Estonia and was positioned with its left flank occupying positions north of the city of Pärnu, along the Pärnu River through the Võhma District and then south-east to Tartu and Lake Peipus.

The 16th Army was at that time on the southern flank of the Army Group around the Velikaya River and west of Novorzhev. The Infantry of the 16th Army was lagging behind the 4th Panzergroup because of the difference in speed, but also because it was asked to support Army Group Center on its right flank.

== Area covered during the operation ==
=== Territory ===
The campaign was conducted in the area to the northwest of the Kalinin Region to the Baltic Sea. In the north the land line of operations was limited to the shores of the Gulf of Finland, north of the Gulf Soviet troops were engaged in the Arctic–Karelia strategic defensive and the defense of the Hanko Peninsula. In the east the German troops reached the southern shore of Lake Ladoga, south along the Kirisha River to Kirishi, then south along the Volkhov River to Veliky Novgorod, including the city, then along the western side of Lake Ilmen to Staraya Russa, from there to the north end of Lake Vella and from the western boundary of the lake to the north shore of Lake Seliger to the region west of Peno. South of the border demarcation operated the forces of German Army Group Center. The length of the fighting front was roughly 450 kilometers and advanced a total of 270–300 kilometers due to Soviet withdrawals.

== Background and operational plans of the forces involved ==
=== German plans ===
On 10 July, it was decided that Panzer Group 4 was to launch a two-pronged attack, without waiting for the slower infantry to arrive.

The XXXXI Panzer Corps of Georg-Hans Reinhardt was to attack towards the city of Luga, while LVI Panzer Corps of Erich von Manstein was to advance toward Lake Ilmen in a flanking movement.

=== Soviet plans ===
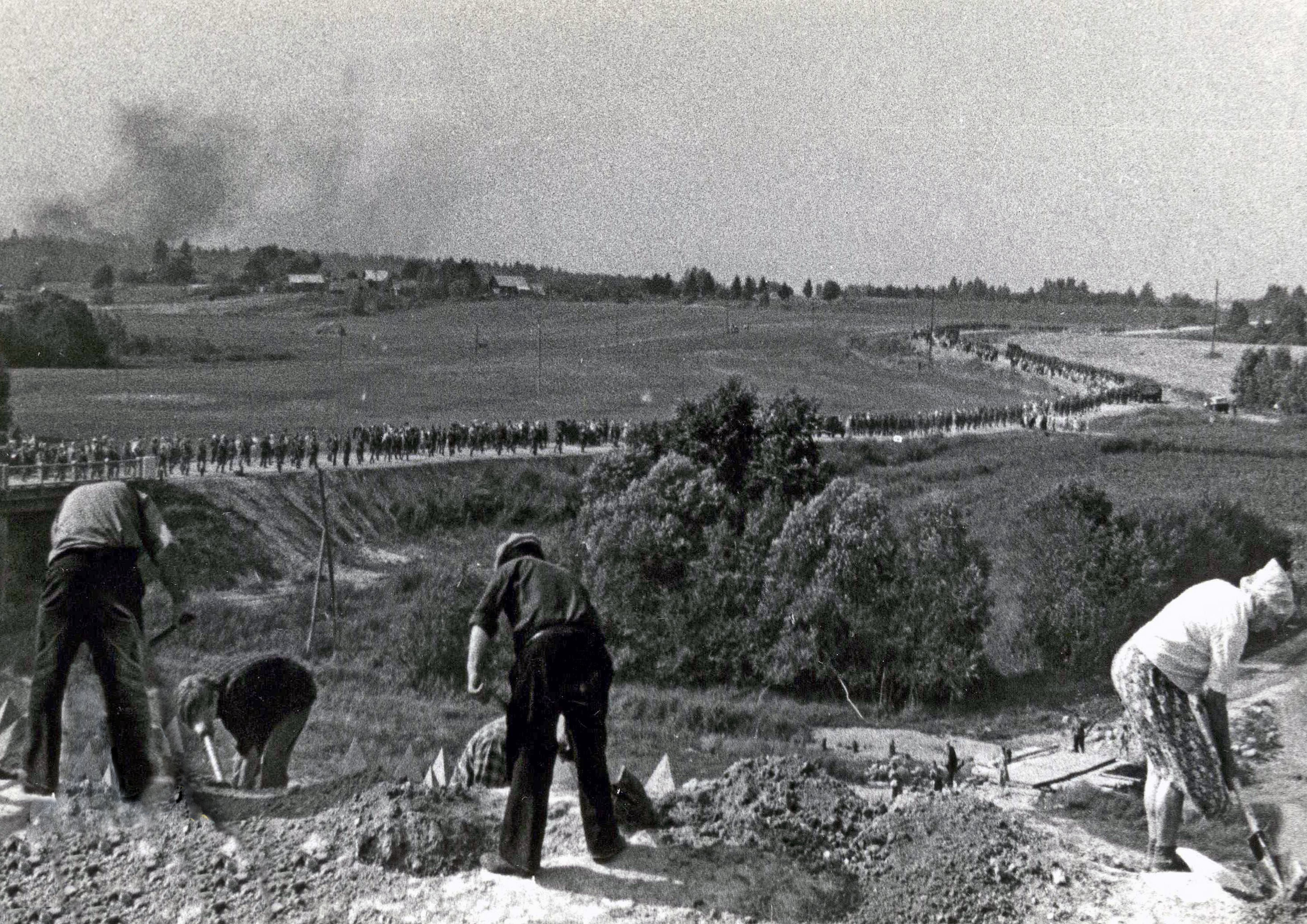
Civilians working on the Luga defensive line in the summer of 1941

On 4 July, General Georgy Zhukov, chief of the General Staff, gave the Military Council of the Northern Front instructions to defend Leningrad. The guideline envisaged the construction of a defensive line between Narva, Luga and Staraja Russa and expanding it to a depth of 10 to 15 km. From the end of June, three divisions of national people's militia were recruited in Leningrad and used to occupy the Luga line. On 6 July, General Konstantin Piadyshev was appointed commander of the new line of defense along the Luga River, and the Northern Front Military Council decided to strengthen the Luga section by transferring the 237th Rifle Division from Petrozavodsk and the 21st and 24th Tank Division of the 10th Mechanized Corps from Karelia. Stawka Guideline No. 260 of 7 July ordered that the commander of the Northern front immediately transfer the 70th and 177th Rifle Division to the commander of the Northwestern Front.

When the German breakthrough began to emerge south of Lake Peipus, the troops of the new line of defense were combined on 6 July to form the Luga Operational Group under General Konstantin Piadyshev's command. The Leningrad Infantry School (2000 men), the Kingisepp Militia and the Leningrad Gun and MG Infantry School (1900 men) soon concentrated in the area east of the city of Narva. A separate mountain rifle brigade (5800 men), which was recruited in Leningrad, was designated to secure the Luga line. The defined line of defense extended almost 250 kilometers in length from the Gulf of Finland along the rivers Luga, Mshaga, Luga Shelon to Lake Ilmen.

The Luga Operational Group consisted of 4 rifle divisions: 70th, 111th, 177th and 191st rifle division as well as the 1st, 2nd and 3rd division of the national militia and the 41st Rifle Corps with the 90th, 235th and 118th rifle divisions.

== Order of battle ==
The German ground forces were supported by Luftflotte 1 which was reinforced by the 8th Fliegercorps as the operation progressed.

== Course of the operation ==
German advance 10-14 July 1941 and the Soviet Luga Line

=== Offensive of the XXXXI Panzer Corps (10–14 July) ===
On 10 July 1941, the advanced units of German Army Group North, breaking the line of the Velikaya River, continued their attack on Leningrad. The XXXXI Panzer Corps, under command of Georg-Hans Reinhardt and consisting of two panzer, motorized and infantry divisions and supported by aircraft, pushed the 118th Rifle Division back to Gdov, and the 90th and 111th Rifle Divisions back to Luga. On July 12, German troops clashed with covering units of the Luga defensive line in the Plyussa River area and were stopped during stubborn fighting. Unable to bypass the defending troops from the flanks because of the swampy terrain, Reinhardt left the 269th Infantry Division at Luga, and diverted the main forces of the XXXXI Panzer Corps towards the north-west and by 14 July captured two bridgeheads on the right bank of the Luga River near the villages of Ivanovskoye and Bol'shoy Sabsk in the area of Kingisepp. The German troops were stopped at these positions by the forces of the Luga Operational Group and were only able to continue the offensive a month later. Meanwhile, a large gap was created between the two Corps of the 4th Panzer Group, which was now divided into two parts heading in different directions. Furthermore, the swampy-wooded area of the Leningrad region seriously impeded the independent actions of the tank units.

=== Offensive of the LVI Panzer Corps (10–14 July) ===
On 10 July, the 3rd Motorized Division of the LVI Panzer Corps occupied the city of Porkhov and continued the offensive in the direction of Dno. The 182nd Soviet Rifle Division fought against the advance, successfully repulsed two attacks, and inflicted casualties of about 400 soldiers and officers on the German 3rd Motorized Division. In addition, Soviet gunners destroyed or damaged 20 enemy tanks. Despite this, by nightfall, the Germans were able to advance east of Porkhov for another three kilometers.

On 12 July, the SS Totenkopf Division was left behind in the Porkhov area, and the 3rd motorized division was directed along a side road to the north. The 8th Panzer Division launched an attack on Shimsk, moving along the highway on the left bank of the Shelon River in the direction of Novgorod. The remnants of the 3rd Tank Division of the 1st Mechanized Corps were trying to hold back the German offensive, retreating from line to line.

On 14 July, German units occupied Soltsy and reached the line of the Mshaga River. Despite the fact that German air reconnaissance had reported a great concentration of Soviet troops and reinforcements from the north, the 8th Panzer Division was ordered to capture the bridge over Mshaga in an intact state.

By 14 July, the right flank of the LVI Corps, which was not covered by anything, turned out to be 70 km long, and the uncovered left flank, some 40 km. The command of the Corps believed that its safety was ensured by its speed.

=== Soviet counter-attack : Battle of Soltsy (14–22 July) ===
The Soviet command decided to take advantage of the fact that the LVI Panzer Corps was left without cover. The commander of the Northwestern Front, Major General Pyotr Sobennikov, on 13 July 1941, issued Order No. 012 to the troops of the 11th Army under command of Lieutenant General Vasili Morozov, reinforced by formations of the Northern Front (21st Tank, 70th and 237th Rifle divisions), to carry out a counter-attack and restore the situation in the Soltsy area.

After approvals, on the evening of 13 July, the commander of the 11th and 27th Armies was sent directive No. 010 on the beginning of the counterstrike. The development of the counterstrike plan took place under the leadership of the Chief of Staff of the North-Western Front Nikolai Vatutin. It was based on the information printed on a secret map that fell into the hands of the Soviet command. It marked the position of all six divisions of Hoepner's Panzer Group. After checking the intelligence data, the headquarters of the North-Western Front developed a counter-offensive plan.

By order of the headquarters of the North-Western Front, the commander of the Soviet 11th Army created two groups of forces for counterattack - the northern and southern. They were to cut off the German force that had broken through to the Mshaga River. From the northern group, two divisions (the 21st Tank and 237th Rifle divisions) advanced from the Gorodishche and Utorgosh line in a southwest direction on Baranovo and Sitnya, and the 70th Rifle division advanced in a southern direction, towards Soltsy. The 1st Separate Mountain Rifle Brigade (1GSSR) also attacked Soltsy from the east. The divisions of the southern group (the 183rd rifle from the 27th army) were to advance in the northern direction, to Sitnya, and there to join up with the units of the northern group.

On 14 July 1941, with the support of 235 aircraft, the Soviet 11th Army went on the offensive.

The sudden counterattack of Soviet troops came as a complete surprise to the German command. The bulk of the German 8th Panzer Division was surrounded. At the same time, the German 3rd Motorized Infantry Division was placed in a difficult position.

On 16 July, the Soviet 70th Rifle Division under the command of Major General Andrey Fedyunin occupied Soltsy. On the same day, the commander of the Northwestern Front ordered the front armies to complete the defeat of the enemy in the Soltsy area and by firmly holding the line occupied by the center and left flank of the 27th Army, the rest of the forces went on the offensive.

However, Manstein ordered the proper counter-action: he withdrew his troops some 40 km and prepared for all-out defence. Most of the LVI Panzer Corps managed to break out of the encirclement and on 16 July, the SS Totenkopf Division was transferred to the LVI Panzer Corps, which restored the situation on the Shelon River. The Soviets launched wave after wave of attacks on the German positions, but were thrown back with heavy losses.

The fierce Soviet counterattack had the effect that on 19 July the entire German Army Group "North" suspended the offensive towards Leningrad. The 8th Panzer Division, which had suffered serious losses, was withdrawn to the rear. On 16 July, the 1st Army Corps had been transferred to the 4th Panzer Group and on 18 July it took Dno from the 22nd Rifle Corps. Soltsy was retaken on 22 July but an attack of the German 21st Infantry Division on Shimsk was repulsed.

Only on 27 July did the situation along the entire front between Narva and Lake Ilmen stabilize, and Army Group North able to think again about continuing the offensive against Leningrad.

=== Renewed German offensive : Battle of Luga–Kingisepp (8 August – 23 August) ===
German renewed advance

The German command had decided to wait for the arrival of the bulk of the 18th Army from Northern Estonia and the 16th Army from Eastern Latvia, to launch a new offensive. On 8 August the LVI Panzer Corps attacked in the area of Luga but failed to advance against strong Soviet defensive positions.

At the same time, the XXXXI Panzer Corps attacked in the Kingisepp area and was more successful. The 8th Panzer Division was added to the Corps and after defeating the 1st Soviet Tank Division at Moloskovitchi, the divisions of the XXXXI Panzer corps reached the road from Kingisepp to Gatchina on 16 August. The next day, the German 1st Infantry Division conquered Kingisepp, while the 291st Infantry Division occupied Narva from the west and the 58th Infantry Division from the south. Meanwhile, German tanks began to bypass the city of Luga on country and forest roads and reached the river Luga in the area 20–25 km southeast of Kingisepp. Under the threat of being cut off from Leningrad, the German XXXVIII Corps forced the 8th Soviet Army to withdraw onto the Koporskoye plateau on 18 August.

Further to the east, the German 16th Army had launched its attack towards Novgorod on 10 August. Preceded by intense aerial attacks by the VIII Air Corps under General Von Richthofen, the German 1st Army Corps (General of the Infantry Kuno-Hans von Both) attacked Novgorod directly with the 11th and 21st Infantry Divisions. The defensive positions of the Soviet troops could be breached. On 14 August 14, the 21st Infantry Division advanced on the Novgorod-Luga highway, and the 11th Infantry Division approached the line from the same direction. This threatened the rear connecting lines of the Soviet troops on the Luga line. The German attack on 15 August initially failed but the Soviet resistance was broken by attacks by dive bombers, which set Novgorod on fire in many places. In the evening the 21st Infantry Division was able to penetrate the city, at the same time as the 424th Regiment of the 126th Infantry Division. On the morning of 16 August, Novgorod was in German hands and the remaining regiments of the 21st Infantry Division launched an attack on Chudovo.

The Soviets 48th Army launched a counterattack to retake Novgorod and the battle for the eastern part of Novgorod lasted until 19 August. Strong air support ultimately ensured the Germans' success in the battles for Novgorod. During the Battle of Novgorod, the left wing of the German I Corps advanced to Chudovo. The 11th Infantry Division now secured the right flank of the corps on the Volkhov section and the 21st Infantry Division conquered Chudovo on 20 August and interrupted the railway line there. The next day, several Soviet counter-attacks on units of the 1st Army Corps were repelled. The targets of the 16th Army had been reached.

The attack by the German XXVIII Corps of the 16th Army finally unlocked the left flank of General Astanin's Luga group. The SS Police Division had also been moved 74 kilometers north to the east bank of Luga and stormed on the city of Luga from the southeast on August 24. On 22 August, General Astanin had received the order to pull back his units behind the railroad to Gatchina (Krasnogvardeysk), but it was too late. The Soviet 70th, 90th, 111th, 177th and 235th Rifle Division, the 1st and 3rd Militia Division, the 24th Armored Division were trapped in the "Luga Pocket". The encirclement was completed in the north by XXXXI Panzer, in the south by the L Army Corps and in the east by XXVIII Army Corps. The struggle in the Luga Pocket continued until mid-September 1941, and some units were able to break out eastwards.

=== The Soviet Staraya Russa counter-offensive (12–25 August) ===
Meanwhile on the southern wing the Soviets were planning their own offensive in what became known as the Staraya Russa offensive operation. The plan was for the newly formed Soviet 48th Army to attack from the Novgorod region along the northwest side of Lake Ilmen, while the newly formed 34th Army, supported by 11th and 27th Armies, would attack south of Lake Ilmen. The Soviets engaged 8 rifle divisions, a cavalry corps and a tank division for the offensive, with the objective of recapturing Staraya Russa and Dno, and destroying the 16th Army’s X Infantry Corps. The offensive started on 12 August and immediately threatened to overwhelm and trap the X Infantry Corps against Lake Ilmen.

The commander-in-chief of the German Army Group North, von Leeb, was forced to transfer the 3rd SS Panzer Division Totenkopf to the area of the Soviet offensive, it was soon followed by the 3rd Motorized Division and Erich von Manstein's LVI Panzer Corps, which was already heavily engaged at Luga. The 8th Air Corps of von Richthofen was also involved in repelling the Soviet counterattack. On 19 August, the LVI Panzer Corps’ attack caught the 34th Army by surprise in the flank. The 34th Army was badly damaged and attempted to withdraw. By 22 August, the LVI Panzer Corps reached the Lovat River having captured 12,000 men from the retreating 34th Army.

As a result of the unsuccessful offensive, the commander of the North-Western Front, Major General Pyotr Sobennikov, was removed from office and sentenced to 5 years in prison, later replaced by a demotion. The commander of the 34th Army, Major General Kuzma Kachanov, was arrested on 12 September, trialed for cowardice and executed on 29 September.

On 28 August, Tallinn fell after a siege of 3 weeks and the Soviet Baltic Fleet evacuated the city. The Germans had conquered Estonia and a large strip of Western Russia up to southern shores of the Gulf of Finland, although some strong-points of Soviet defence held out.

=== Encirclement of Leningrad (25 August – 21 September) ===
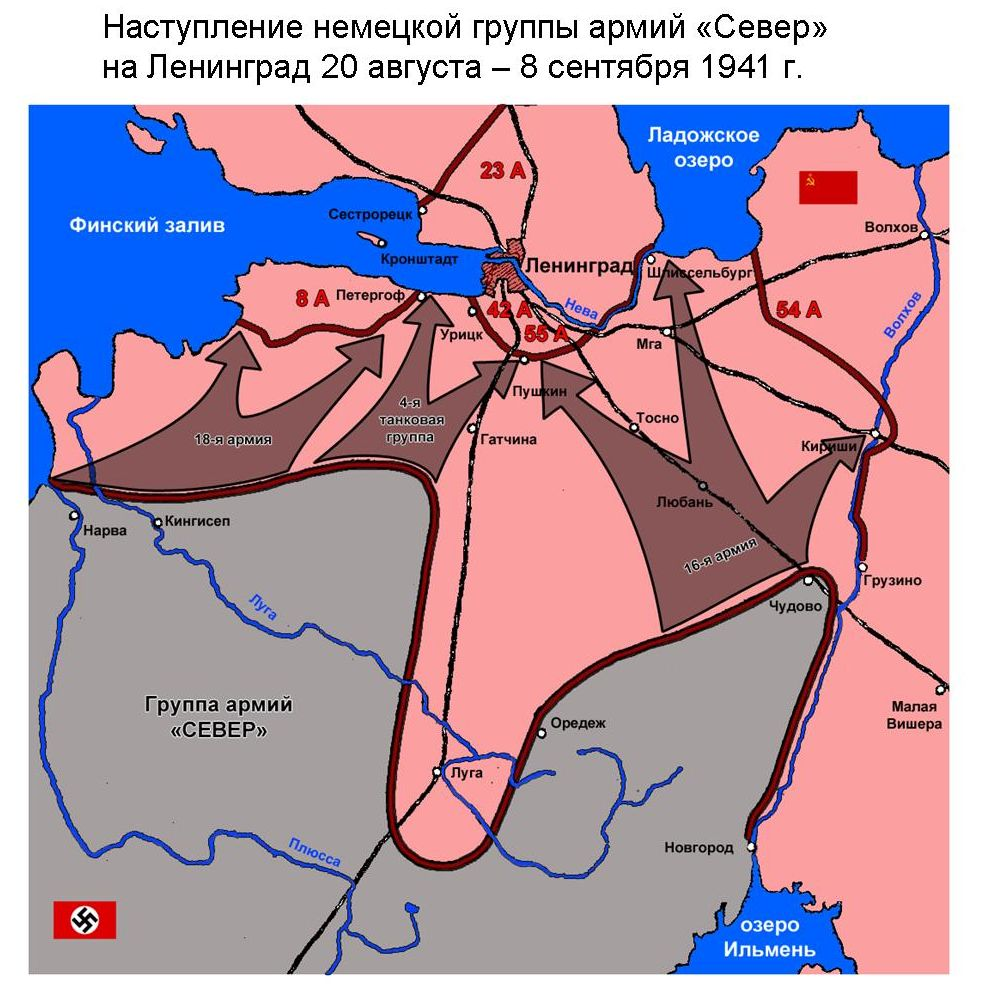
Final advance on Leningrad

For the final attack on the city, the German XXXIX Panzer Corps was relocated from Army Group Centre to Army Group North. It was ordered to cut off the city from the rest of the Soviet Union, bypassing the city to the east. The I Army Corps was to advance north along the left bank of the Volkhov river towards Kirishi, covering the right flank of the XXXIX Panzer Army.

With the deepening crisis the Stavka assigned the newly mobilised 4th, 52nd and 54th Armies along and east of the Volkhov River. The Stavka also approved the formation of two new Armies: the 42nd and 55th, which would defend Leningrad itself.

The main German thrust on Leningrad was to be executed by the XXXXI Panzer Corps, in cooperation with the XXXVIII Army Corps on its left flank. In the south, between Gatchina and Mga, the L and XXVIII Army corps were to attack the southern belt around Leningrad.

On 25 and 26 August the two Panzer corps attacked. The XXXIX Panzer Corps captured Lyuban the same day and advanced towards the Neva River. On 1 September, the XXXIX Panzer Corps captured Mga and cut the last rail link to Leningrad. On 8 September, the 20th Motorized Division captured Shlisselburg on the shores of Lake Ladoga, closing the last land route out of Leningrad.

In the meantime, the XXXXI Panzer Division, supported by von Chappuis’s infantry, cut through the Soviet lines and advanced almost 10 kilometers and put further pressure on the shrinking line around Leningrad and the Oranienbaum region.

Also in the South, Soviet defensive positions began to crumble: Krasnoye Selo was lost on 12 September and Krasnogvardeysk (Gatchina) on 13 September. The remains of General Baranov's armored division continued to withdraw, occupying new positions on the Pulkovo Heights, the last line of defense on the southwestern approach of Leningrad.

In mid September 1941, two events had a serious impact on the course of events around Leningrad. On 14 September, Georgi Zhukov arrived in Leningrad to replace Marshal Voroshilov and ordered immediate counter-measures to push back the German troops. Around the same time, Adolf Hitler had changed his mind on Leningrad. He decided that Army Group North should not occupy the city, but surround it and starve it into submission. He also ordered the furious von Leeb to hand over all his armoured units and Panzer Group 4 to Army Group Centre for the coming attack on Moscow, except the 39th Panzer Corps.

From 14 to 21 September, the 18th Army continued to push the Soviet perimeter inwards, finally isolating the Soviet 8th Army in the Oranienbaum Pocket against the Gulf of Finland. On 17 September, Tsarskoye Selo in the town of Pushkin, was occupied by the German troops. During this period, the 41st and 56th Panzer Corps and the HQ of 4th Panzer Group were pulled back from the frontline to participate in the Battle of Moscow, and the German advance came to a halt.

== Results of the operations ==
At great costs, the Soviets had held the Luga Line for 45 days : from 10 July until 24 August, when German troops took Luga. Until 10 July, the average daily advance of the Germans was about 26 kilometers per day; then it fell to 5 kilometers a day and in August to 2.2 kilometers a day. Stopping and delaying the German advance enabled the Soviet leadership to take important measures regarding the defense of Leningrad, including the formation and training of new military units. Furthermore, between 29 June and 27 August 1941, 488,703 civilians were evacuated from Leningrad.

The retreating Soviet forces (and civilians alike) were cut off the Soviet mainland in Leningrad, isolated from the bulk of Soviet-controlled territory by the Finns and Lake Ladoga. Despite many costly attempts, the Soviets did not lift the siege completely until January 1944.

Subsequent operations continued on the outskirts of Leningrad, including the 1st and Second Sinyavino Offensives from 10 September – 28 October 1941 and the Tikhvin defensive, 16 October – 18 November 1941.
