= Oskar Eckholt =

- Born: 4 November 1894
- Died: 12 August 1982 (aged 87)
- Military career
- Allegiance: German Empire; Weimar Republic; Nazi Germany
- Branch: Army
- Service years: 1914–1919; 1934–1945
- Rank: Generalmajor
- Commands: 291. Infanterie-Division
- Conflicts: World War II
- Awards: Knight's Cross of the Iron Cross

Oskar Eckholt (4 November 1894 – 12 August 1982) was a German general (Generalmajor) in the Wehrmacht during World War II. He was a recipient of the Knight's Cross of the Iron Cross of Nazi Germany. Eckholt surrendered to American troops in May 1945. He was released in 1947.

== Awards and decorations ==
- German Cross in Gold on 18 May 1942 as Oberstleutnant in Artillerie-Regiment 178
- Knight's Cross of the Iron Cross on 9 April 1943 as Oberst and commander of Artillerie-Regiment 178

Military offices
Preceded by Generalleutnant Werner Goeritz	Commander of 291. Infanterie-Division; 15 January 1944 - 10 July 1944	Succeeded by Generalmajor Arthur Finger
