= Sigfrid Henrici =

German general (1889–1964)

- Born: 10 May 1889; Soest, Province of Westphalia, Kingdom of Prussia, German Empire
- Died: 8 November 1964 (aged 75); Bad Nauheim, Hesse, West Germany
- Military career
- Allegiance: German Empire; Weimar Republic; Nazi Germany
- Branch: German Army
- Service years: 1907–1945
- Rank: General der Panzertruppe
- Commands: 16th Infantry Division; XXXX Panzer Corps
- Conflicts: World War I World War II
- Awards: Knight's Cross of the Iron Cross with Oak Leaves

General Sigfrid Henrici (10 May 1889 – 8 November 1964) was a German general during World War II.

During the invasion of Poland in 1939, Henrici was the commander of the 16th Infantry Division (motorised).

He commanded XXXX Panzer Corps from November 1942 to October 1943, when he was severely wounded in Ukraine. He returned to service in 1944 and became again commander of the XXXX Panzerkorps in September, which he led until the end of the war.

He was taken prisoner by the Red Army on 9 May 1945 and was released from Soviet captivity in 1955. He died on 8 November 1964.

== Awards ==
- Iron Cross (1914) 2nd Class (14 September 1914) & 1st Class (24 December 1915)
- Clasp to the Iron Cross (1939) 2nd Class (20 September 1939) & 1st Class (20 May 1940)
- German Cross in Gold on 13 August 1943 as General der Panzertruppe and commanding general of the XXXX. Panzerkorps
- Knight's Cross of the Iron Cross with Oak Leaves
  - Knight's Cross on 13 October 1941 as Generalleutnant and commander of the 16. Infanterie-Division (motorized)
  - Oak Leaves on 9 December 1943 as General der Panzertruppe and commanding general of the XL. Panzerkorps

Military offices
Preceded by General der Infanterie Friedrich-Wilhelm von Chappuis	Commander of 16. Infanterie-Division; 15 March 1941 – 13 November 1942	Succeeded by Generalleutnant Johannes Streich
Preceded by General der Panzertruppen Gustav Fehn	Commander of XXXX Panzer Corps; 13 November 1942 - 1 October 1943	Succeeded by General der Panzertruppen Ferdinand Schörner
Preceded by General der Panzertruppen Otto von Knobelsdorff	Commander of XXXX Panzer Corps; 1 September 1944 - 8 May 1945	Succeeded by None
