= Arthur Finger =

German military

- Born: 18 January 1898
- Died: 27 January 1945 (aged 47); Tschenstochau, Poland
- Military career
- Allegiance: German Empire; Weimar Republic; Nazi Germany
- Branch: Army
- Service years: 1914–1920; 1935–1945
- Rank: Generalmajor
- Commands: 291. Infanterie-Division
- Conflicts: World War II: Battle of France; Operation Barbarossa; Operation Silver Fox; Battle of the Caucasus; Lvov–Sandomierz Offensive; Vistula-Oder Offensive †
- Awards: Knight's Cross of the Iron Cross

Arthur Finger (18 January 1898 – 27 January 1945), born in Toruń, was a German general (Generalmajor) in the Wehrmacht during World War II. He was a recipient of the Knight's Cross of the Iron Cross of Nazi Germany. Finger was killed on 27 January 1945 near Tschenstochau, Poland during the Soviet Vistula–Oder Offensive.

== Awards and decorations ==
- Knight's Cross of the Iron Cross on 16 November 1943 as Oberst and commander of Artillerie-Regiment 306

Military offices
Preceded by Generalmajor Oskar Eckholt	Commander of 291. Infanterie-Division; 12 July 1944 - 27 January 1945	Succeeded by None
Preceded by General der Infanterie Hermann Recknagel	Commander of XXXXII. Armeekorps; 23 January 1945 – 27 January 1945	Succeeded by None
