= 16th Infantry Division (Wehrmacht) =

Infantry division of the Nazi German Army

16th Infantry Division 16th Motorized Infantry Division 16th Panzergrenadier-Division
- 116th Panzer Division, 1944–45
- Active: October 1934 – 8 May 1945
- Country: Nazi Germany
- Branch: Army
- Type: Panzer
- Role: Armoured warfare
- Size: Division
- Engagements: World War II: Battle of France; Operation Barbarossa; Battle of Stalingrad; Allied invasion of Sicily; Allied invasion of Italy; Dnieper-Carpathian Offensive; Battle of Normandy; Falaise Gap; Battle of Aachen; Battle of Hurtgen Forest; Battle of the Bulge; Ruhr Pocket

Commanders
- Notable commanders: Gotthard Heinrici; Gerhard von Schwerin

Insignia
- 16th Panzer Division

The 16th Infantry Division of the German Army was formed in 1934. On 26 August 1939 the division was mobilized for the invasion of Poland (1939). It participated in the Battle of France in August 1940. The division was then split, resulting in two independent units: The 16th Panzer Division and the 16th Motorized Infantry Division. Then later, from 1944 onward, combined with other non 16th elements, was known as the 116th Panzer Division.

== 16th Panzer Division ==
The 16th Panzer Division served as a reserve in Romania during the Balkans campaign in 1941. It then participated in Operation Barbarossa with Army Group South, also in 1941.

A kampfgruppe of 16th Panzer Division, led by Count Strachwitz, reached the outskirts of Stalingrad on 23 August 1942, brushing aside the sole Soviet defences, anti-aircraft guns manned by female factory workers (possibly the 1077th Anti-Aircraft Regiment). The 16th Panzer Division was encircled and ultimately destroyed at Stalingrad during the winter of 1942–43.

It was rebuilt for a campaign in the west, fought in Sicily and southern Italy during the Italian Campaign in 1943 and returned to the Russian Front later in the year. Severely mauled near Kiev, it was withdrawn to Poland for rehabilitation in 1944. The 16th Panzer Division returned to the east in 1945, where it surrendered to the Soviets and Americans in Czechoslovakia.

== Motorized Division ==
The 16th Motorized Infantry Division, nicknamed Windhund ("Greyhound"), participated in the Balkans campaign in 1941 along with the 16th Panzer Division (see above). It took part in Operation Barbarossa with Army Group South later in the year. It advanced on the Caucasus with elements coming to within 20 miles of Astrakhan on 14 September 1942 – the most easterly point reached by any German unit during the war.

It also participated in the Battle of Stalingrad. The 16th Motorized Infantry Division participated in defensive operations after the Soviets broke up the front of the southern sector.

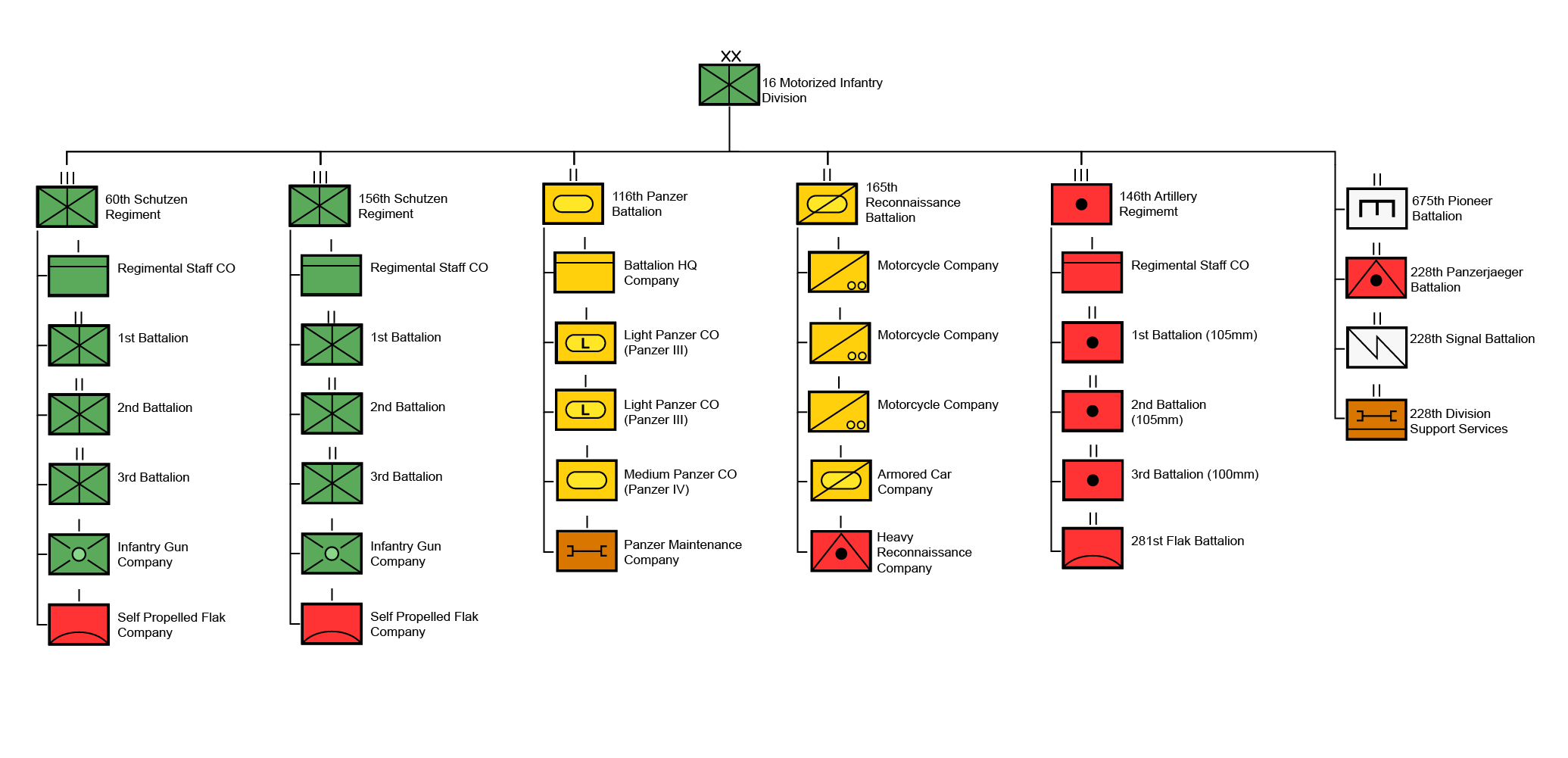
OrBat graphic of German 16th Motorized Infantry Division in June 1942

In June 1943, it was upgraded to 16th Panzergrenadier Division. This upgraded formation was depleted in the continuous retreats and was transferred to France for rest and refitting.

== 116th Panzer Division ==
In March 1944, it was reorganized as the 116th Panzer Division (with the number changed since the 16th Panzer Division was already taken by its sibling), absorbing the 179th Reserve Panzer Division in the process. This new formation fought in the Battle of Normandy and was almost destroyed in the Falaise Gap.

It subsequently defended the Siegfried Line at Aachen in an understrength condition. The 116th Panzer Division was withdrawn for refitting and then recommitted, but was unable to hold the city of Aachen. It later participated in the Battle of Hurtgen Forest then in the Battle of the Bulge, again sustaining heavy casualties. It was caught in the Wesel Pocket, but got across the Rhine, ultimately surrendering within the Ruhr Pocket in April, 1945.

== 16th Volksgrenadier Division ==
In parallel, a 16th Volksgrenadier Division was created in October 1944, which defended the Upper Rhine until March 1945, when it was forced to retreat deeper into Germany.

== War crimes ==
The 16th Motorized Infantry Division has been implicated in the San Clemente di Caserta massacre, Campania, on 4 October 1943, when 25 civilians were murdered.

== Organization ==
Structure of the division:

- Headquarters
- 16th Reconnaissance Battalion
- 60th Infantry Regiment
- 64th Infantry Regiment
- 79th Infantry Regiment
- 16th Field Replacement Battalion
- 16th Engineer Battalion
- 16th Artillery Regiment
- 16th Anti-Tank Battalion
- 16th Signal Battalion
- 16th Divisional Supply Group

== Commanding officers ==
=== 16th Infantry Division ===
- Generalleutnant Gerhard Glokke (October 1934 – 12 October 1937)
- Generalleutnant Gotthard Heinrici (12 October 1937 – 31 January 1940)
- Generalmajor Heinrich Krampf (1 February 1940 – 31 May 1940)
- Generalmajor Hans-Valentin Hube (1 June 1940 – 6 August 1940)

=== 16th Motorized Infantry Division ===
- Generalleutnant Friedrich-Wilhelm von Chappuis (12 August 1940 – 15 March 1941)
- Generalleutnant Sigfrid Henrici (15 March 1941 – Mid August 1941)
- Generalleutnant Johannes Streich (Mid August 1941 – Mid November 1941)
- Generalleutnant Sigfrid Henrici (Mid November 1941 – 13 November 1942)
- Generalmajor Gerhard Graf von Schwerin (13 November 1942 – 20 May 1943)
- Oberst Wilhelm Crisolli (20 May 1943 – 27 June 1943)

=== 16th Panzergrenadier Division ===
- General der Panzertruppen Gerhard Graf von Schwerin (27 June 1943 – January 1944)
- Generalmajor Günther von Manteuffel (January 1944 – March 1944)
- Generalmajor Karl Stingl (March 1944)
