= XXXVIII Army Corps (Wehrmacht) =

- Generalkommando XXXVIII. Armeekorps
- Active: 21 January 1940 – 10 May 1945
- Country: Nazi Germany
- Branch: Army
- Engagements: Fall Gelb; Fall Rot; Baltic Operation; Leningrad Strategic Defensive; Siege of Leningrad

Commanders
- Notable commanders: Erich von Manstein; Friedrich-Wilhelm von Chappuis; Siegfried Haenicke; Kurt Herzog; Horst von Mellenthin

The German XXXVIII Corps (XXXVIII Armeekorps) was a German army corps during World War II.

On 8 January 1945, the XXXVIII Corps was redesignated as the XXXVIII Tank Corps (XXXVIII Panzerkorps).

== Commanders ==
- Field Marshal (Generalfeldmarschall) Erich von Manstein - 1 February 1940 to 28 February 1941
- Infantry General (General der Infanterie) Friedrich-Wilhelm von Chappuis - 15 March 1941 to 23 April 1942
- Infantry General (General der Infanterie) Siegfried Haenicke - 23 April 1942 to 29 June 1942
- Artillery General (General der Artillerie) Kurt Herzog - 29 June 1942 to 8 January 1945
- Artillery General (General der Artillerie) Horst von Mellenthin - 8 January 1945 to 16 March 1945 (as the XXXVIII Tank Corps)
- Artillery General (General der Artillerie) Kurt Herzog - 16 March 1945 - 10 May 1945

== Area of operations ==
- Germany - January 1940 to June 1940
- France - June 1940 to June 1941
- Eastern Front, northern sector - June 1941 to October 1944
- Courland Pocket - October 1944 to 10 May 1945

== Bibliography ==
- Tessin, Georg. Verbände und Truppen der deutschen Wehrmacht und Waffen–SS im Zweiten Weltkrieg 1939–1945 [Units and Troops of the German Military and Waffen-SS in the Second World War 1939–1945] (in German). Vol. 5: Die Landstreitkräfte 31–70 (Units 31–70). Osnabrück: Biblio.
