= Siegfried Haenicke =

- Born: 8 September 1878; Konstanz, German Empire
- Died: 19 February 1946 (aged 67); NKVD Special Camp No. 1, Brandenburg, Allied-occupied Germany
- Military career
- Allegiance: German Empire; Weimar Republic; Nazi Germany
- Branch: German Army
- Service years: 1897–1932; 1939–1945
- Rank: General der Infanterie
- Commands: 61st Infantry Division; XXXVIII Army Corps
- Conflicts: World War I; World War II; Invasion of Poland; Battle of Mława; Siege of Warsaw (1939); Battle of Belgium; Battle of France; Battle of Dunkirk; Operation Barbarossa; Siege of Leningrad; Battle of Porytowe Wzgórze
- Awards: Pour le Mérite; Knight's Cross of the Iron Cross

Siegfried Haenicke (8 September 1878 – 19 February 1946) was a general in the Wehrmacht of Nazi Germany during World War II who commanded the XXXVIII Army Corps. He was a recipient of both the Pour le Mérite and Knight's Cross of the Iron Cross.

From 30 September 1942, he became military commander of Wehrkreis General Government (Poland), renamed Befehlshaber Heeresgebiet Generalgouvernement in October 1944. In this function, he ordered the participation of the Wehrmacht in the suppression of the Sobibor uprising in October 1943. On 31 January 1945, he was transferred back to the Führer reserve. Haenicke was arrested by the Soviets in 1945, and died in 1946 in NKVD Special Camp No. 1.

== Awards ==
- Pour le Mérite
- Knight's Cross of the Royal House Order of Hohenzollern with swords
- Iron Cross (1914)
  - 1st Class
  - 2nd Class
- Hanseatic Cross of Hamburg
- Military Merit Cross of Austria-Hungary, 3rd class with war decoration
- Wound Badge in black
- Iron Cross (1939)
  - 2nd Class
  - 1st Class
- German Cross in Gold (4 September 1942)
- Knight's Cross of the Iron Cross on 17 September 1941 as generalleutnant and commander of 61st Infantry Division

== See also ==
- List of the Pour le Mérite (military class) recipients

Military offices
Preceded by none	Commander of 61st Infantry Division; 8 August 1939 - 27 March 1942	Succeeded by Generalmajor Franz Scheidies
Preceded by General der Infanterie Friedrich-Wilhelm von Chappuis	Commander of XXXVIII Army Corps; 23 April 1942 - 29 June 1942	Succeeded by General der Artillerie Kurt Herzog
Preceded by General der Kavallerie z.V. Kurt Ludwig Freiherr von Gienanth	Military Commander of the General Government; 30 September 1942 - 31 January 1945	Succeeded by None
