= Battle of Porytowe Wzgórze =

Coordinates: 50°30′00″N 23°00′00″E

- Part of Operation Tempest in the Eastern Front of World War II
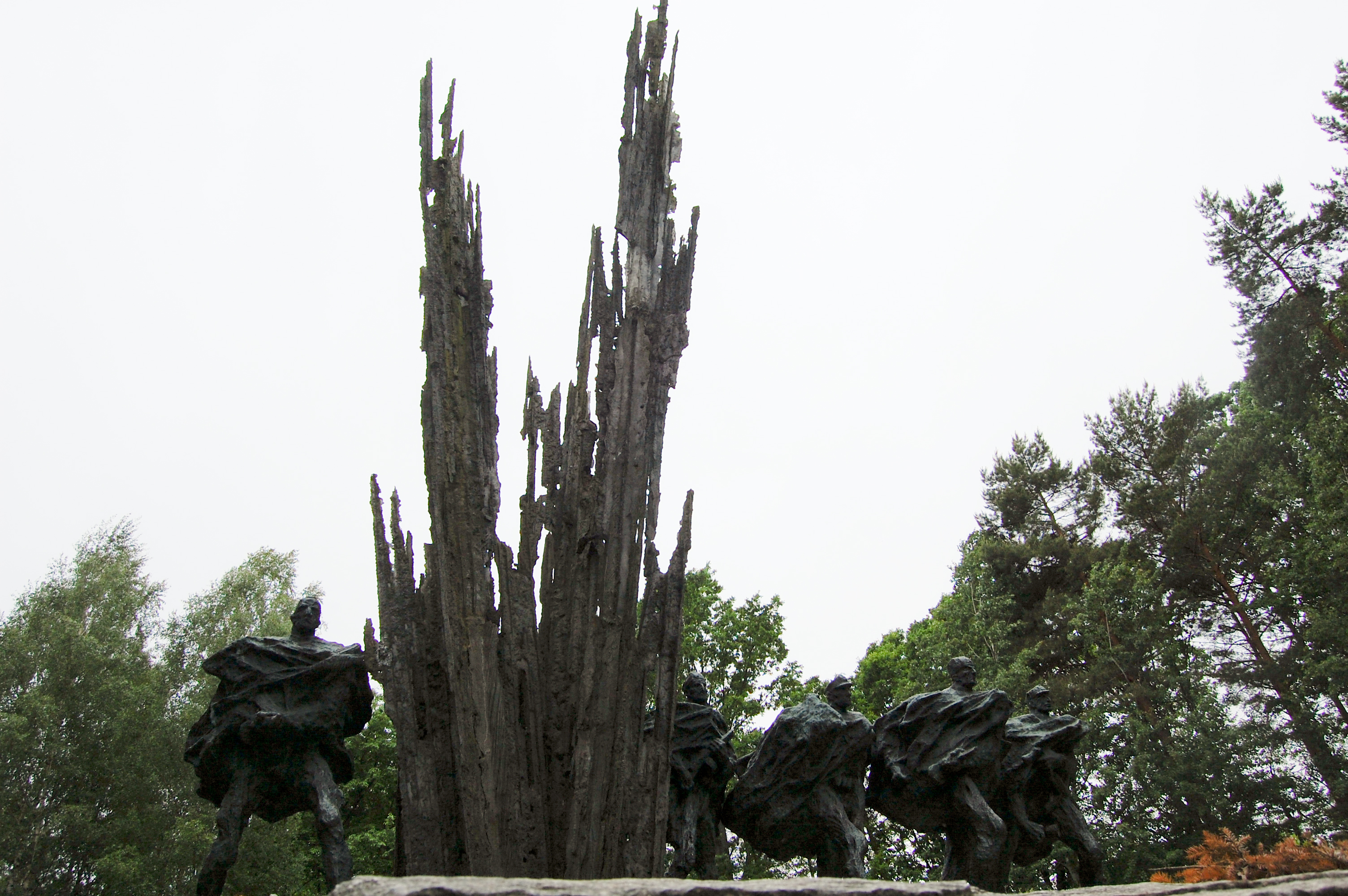
- A monument to the battle by Bronisław Chromy
Date	June 14–15, 1944
Location	Solska Forest
Result	Temporary Polish and Soviet partisan victory (see Battle of Osuchy)

Belligerents
(Polish Underground State) Polish resistance: Armia Krajowa; National Military Organization; Armia Ludowa); Soviet Union (partisans)	Germany

Commanders and leaders
Nikolai Prokopiuk; Franciszek Przysiężniak; Bolesław Usow; Stanisław Szelest	Siegfried Haenicke

Strength
3,000	25,000–30,000

Casualties and losses
170	500+

The Battle of Porytowe Wzgórze (Porytowe Hill) took place on June 14, 1944, between Polish and Soviet partisans and Nazi German forces.

== Prelude ==
In the spring of 1944, numerous partisan units operated in the Lublin region, including those associated with the Home Army (AK), Bataliony Chłopskie (BCh), National Military Organization (NOW) as well as the communist Armia Ludowa (AL) and Soviet partisans. These fighters kept being pushed westward by the Germans, as the front approached from the east. The activities of the partisan units mostly consisted of attacks on German supply lines and convoys. As a result, in May 1944, the Germans developed a detailed plan of an anti-partisan action, code named "Sturmwind" (Storm-wind) which they put into effect in early June. The purpose of the operation was the elimination of Polish and Soviet partisan units from the area of Janów Forests.

The German commander in charge was General Siegfried Haenicke. The Soviet partisans were under the command of Nikolai Prokopiuk. The NOW-AK forces were commanded by Bolesław Usow (the top commander of the unit, Franciszek Przysiężniak was not present until later) and the AL units by Stanisław Szelest. There were also several "mixed" units under various commanders.

== The battle ==
On 14 June the Polish and Soviet partisans, numbering around 3,000 in total, found themselves tightly surrounded by German forces. The German units consisted of between 25,000 and 30,000 soldiers, with artillery, tanks, armored cars and air support.

After an artillery and mortar barrage, the Germans managed to make two breaks in the partisans' line of defense. However, these attacks were eventually driven back, although at a high cost to the Polish and Soviet partisans. The Germans, relying on their superior numbers and armaments, managed to take control of a small wood nearby from which they could keep the partisans under constant fire, causing high casualties among them. Using this as a base for further attacks, German forces managed to seize the western side of the Porytowe Hill which breached the main line of defense. However, the Poles and Soviets soon counterattacked, recovered the lost positions and, that night (of 14 June), made an attempt to break out from the trap. The main columns of partisans, after fierce fighting, many casualties and a forced 40 kilometer march, managed to reach the relative safety of the Solska Forest.

Partisan casualties were about 170, including around 100 killed and 70 wounded. 495 Wehrmacht soldiers also died, as well as an unknown number of German police and auxiliary forces.

== Aftermath ==
While the partisans managed to break out of the trap and effectively win a temporary victory, the Germans had already planned a follow-up operation, "Sturmwind II", centered on the Solska Forest, which led to the Battle of Osuchy at the end of June. The Wehrmacht managed to accomplish in Sturmwind II/Osuchy what they failed to do in Sturmwind I/Porytowe Wzgórze.
