= Kurt Herzog =

German general (1889–1948)

- Born: 27 March 1889; Quedlinburg, Saxony-Anhalt, German Empire
- Died: 8 May 1948 (aged 59); Vorkuta, Russian SFSR, Soviet Union
- Military career
- Allegiance: German Empire; Weimar Republic; Nazi Germany
- Branch: German Army
- Service years: 1907–1945
- Rank: General der Artillerie
- Commands: 291st Infantry Division; XXXVIII Army Corps
- Conflicts: World War I; World War II; Battle of France; Operation Barbarossa; Siege of Leningrad; Courland Pocket
- Awards: Knight's Cross of the Iron Cross with Oak Leaves

Kurt Herzog (27 March 1889 – 8 May 1948) was a German general during World War II. He was a recipient of the Knight's Cross of the Iron Cross with Oak Leaves. Herzog surrendered to the Soviet troops in May 1945 and died in captivity at a prisoner of war camp.

Herzog was born in Quedlinburg in 1889 and entered the Royal Prussian Army in 1907. He served in World War I as an artillery officer, ending the war as an Hauptmann and the adjutant of an artillery regiment. He remained as a career officer in the peacetime Reichswehr, serving as the commander of artillery regiments from 1934 to 1939. During World War II, Herzog commanded the 291st Infantry Division (1940–1942) and the XXXVIII Army Corps (1942–1945).

== Awards and decorations ==
- Iron Cross (1914) 2nd Class (26 October 1914) & 1st Class (6 November 1916)
- Knight's Cross of the Military Order of St. Henry
- Knight's Cross 1st class with swords and crown of the Albert Order
- Hanseatic Cross of Hamburg
- Frederickscross
- Military Merit Cross of Austria-Hungary, 3rd class with war decoration
- Clasp to the Iron Cross (1939) 2nd Class (10 September 1939) & 1st Class (29 September 1939)
- Knight's Cross of the Iron Cross with Oak Leaves
  - Knight's Cross on 18 October 1941 as Generalleutnant and commander of 291. Infanterie-Division
  - Oak Leaves on 12 January 1945 as General der Artillerie and commander of XXXVIII.Armeekorps

Military offices
Preceded by None	Commander of 291. Infanterie-Division; 7 February 1940 - 10 June 1942	Succeeded by Generalleutnant Werner Goeritz
Preceded by General der Infanterie Siegfried Haenicke	Commander of XXXVIII. Armeekorps; 29 June 1942 - 8 January 1945	Succeeded by Renamed XXXVIII Panzerkorps
