= Johannes Streich =

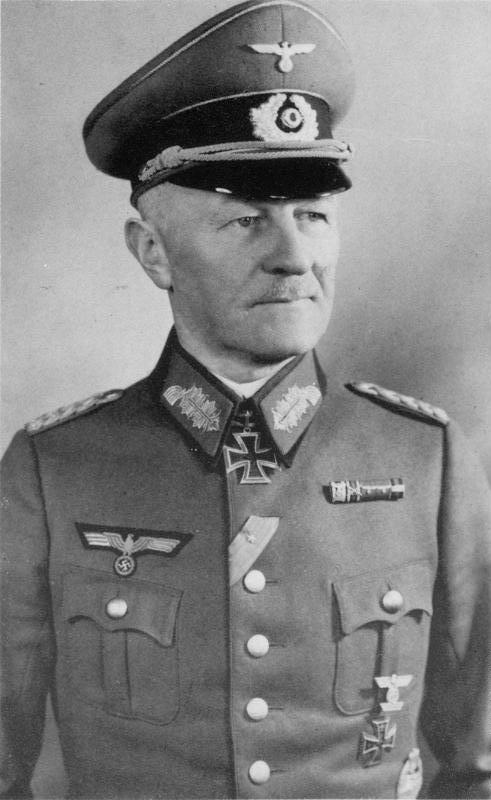
- Johannes Streich
- Born: 16 April 1891
- Died: 20 August 1977 (aged 86)
- Military career
- Allegiance: German Empire; Weimar Republic; Germany
- Branch: Army
- Service years: 1911–1945
- Rank: Generalleutnant
- Commands: 5th Light Division; 16th Motorised Infantry Division
- Conflicts: World War I World War II: Invasion of Poland; Battle of Belgium; Battle of France; North African Campaign; Siege of Tobruk; Operation Barbarossa; Battle of Moscow; Siege of Breslau
- Awards: Knight's Cross of the Iron Cross

Johannes Streich (16 April 1891 – 20 August 1977) was a German general in the Wehrmacht during World War II who commanded the 5th Light Division during the early stages of the North African Campaign. Sacked for his poor performance during the Siege of Tobruk, he later briefly commanded the 16th Motorised Infantry Division during the advance on Moscow. A veteran of World War I, he was also a recipient of the Knight's Cross of the Iron Cross.

== Early life ==
Born in Augustenburg on 16 April 1891, Streich joined the army of Imperial Germany as an Fahnen-junker (officer cadet) in 1911 after completing his schooling. He was commissioned into the 2nd Railroad Regiment, stationed at Berlin-Schöneberg and operating the Royal Prussian Military Railway, as a leutnant (second lieutenant) two years later. During World War I, he served on both the Western and Eastern Fronts and was awarded the Iron Cross, both 1st and 2nd classes. He ended the war as an oberleutnant (first lieutenant) and company commander.

== Interwar period ==
Streich was retained in the postwar Reichswehr (Imperial Defence) and, having developed an interest in motorized warfare, in 1921 was based in Hannover as a commander of a motor transport company. He was promoted to hauptmann (captain) two years later. By 1930 he was an advisor in the Army Ordnance Office and played a role in the development of armoured vehicles including the Panzer I tank. He took command of the 15th Panzer Regiment in 1935, having been promoted oberstleutnant (lieutenant colonel).

His new command was part of the 8th Panzer Brigade, 5th Panzer Division, and was part of the force that occupied the Sudetenland in 1938. As a regimental commander, Streich had difficult relationships with two of his battalion commanders. By early 1939, tensions had escalated to the point where Streich's divisional commander had to resolve the situation by moving the two junior officers to new roles with other units.

== World War II ==
Streich's 15th Panzer Regiment played only a minor role in the Invasion of Poland but was more prominent in the Battle of France the following year. It was involved in the encirclement of French forces at Lille and then the Battle of Dunkirk. After the British evacuation, the regiment made for the Seine and then onto Rouen. At one stage, Streich had a dispute with Generalmajor Erwin Rommel, (Note: In the Wehrmacht, the rank of generalmajor was equivalent to a brigadier general in the United States Army.) whose 7th Panzer Division was operating nearby, over some bridging equipment. His regiment ended the French campaign near the Spanish border having made 20,000 French and British soldiers prisoners of war. He would be awarded the Knight's Cross for his regiment's capture of Veules-les-Roses while it was in the process of being evacuated. Streich's panzers overran the town during a night attack and captured thousands of prisoners including two brigade commanders and the French division commander Général Durant.

In early 1941, Streich was given command of the 5th Panzer Brigade, 4th Panzer Division. Shortly afterwards he was promoted to generalmajor and was appointed commander of the 5th Light Division.

=== North Africa ===
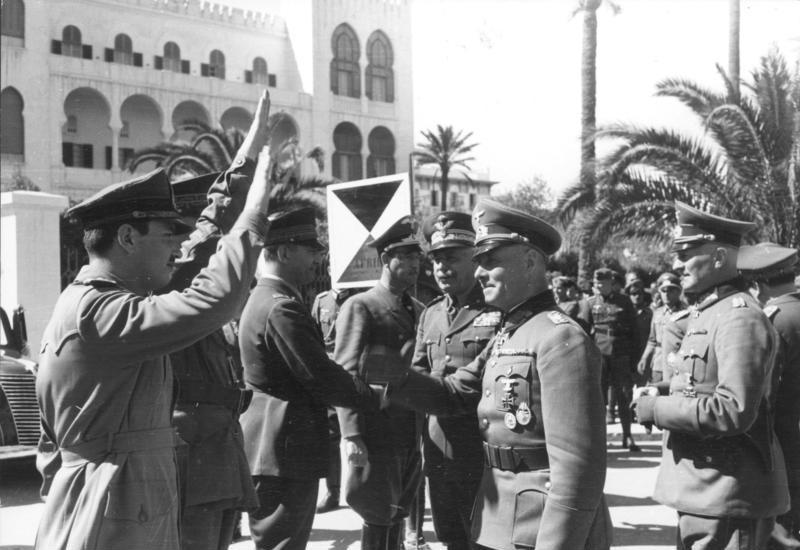
Streich (extereme right), with Erwin Rommel (2nd from right) welcomes Italian officers including General Italo Gariboldi in Tripoli, Libya in February 1941.

The 5th Light Division was still in the process of being formed and was only activated on 18 February 1941. Shortly afterwards it was dispatched to Libya to join the newly formed Afrika Korps, commanded by Rommel, now a generalleutnant. (Note: A generalleutnant was equivalent to the rank of major general in the United States Army.) Although Streich arrived in the country in late February, his division was not complete until the following month. From 31 March, it was involved in Operation Sonnenblume (Operation Sunflower) and Streich's forces largely destroyed the British 2nd Armoured Division. Nonetheless, Rommel was not impressed with his leadership, considering him too cautious and slow in his advance. When Streich opposed orders to attack the town of Mechili on 7 April on the grounds his division was not prepared, Rommel accused him of cowardice. The accusation was retracted when Streich threatened to return his Knight's Cross.

As the advance moved onto Tobruk, Streich continued to be conservative with the use of his forces and Rommel grew increasingly frustrated after attacks mounted on Tobruk on 12 and 13 April failed. Given a final chance to capture the port in early May, Streich failed again and Rommel relieved him of his command. Streich returned to Germany and Generaloberst Franz Halder, (Note: A generaloberst was equivalent to the rank of general in the United States Army.) the head of the Oberkommando des Heeres (OKH) and an acquaintance from his time at the Army Ordnance Office, soon found him a new assignment on the Eastern Front.

=== Eastern Front ===
Originally a commander of a battle group during Operation Barbarossa, Streich was soon given command of the 16th Motorised Infantry Division when its commanding officer, Generalleutnant Sigfrid Henrici, fell ill. At the time, it was engaged in the Battle of Kiev before being transferred to Generaloberst Heinz Guderian's 2nd Panzer Army to participate in the advance on Moscow. He was soon criticised by Guderian for the division's slow pace and when Henrici recovered his health and resumed command of the division in November 1941, Streich was returned to Germany.

== Later life ==
After his return to Berlin, Streich was without a post for seven months until Halder made him inspector of mobile troops for OKH. This was not a significant role and nor was his following appointment, commander of Recruiting Area Breslau, in June 1943. He received a promotion to generalleutnant in October 1943. He was able to avoid the encirclement of Breslau by the Soviet Army in February 1945 and made his way to Berlin where he was made commander of that city's Recruiting Area. He evaded the Soviet Army when they captured Berlin and was able to surrender to the Allies in the west. Held as a prisoner of war for three years, he later lived in Hamburg and died there on 20 August 1977.

== Notes ==
Footnotes

Citations

Military offices
Preceded by General der Panzertruppe Hans Freiherr von Funck	Commander of 5th Light Division; 7 February 1941 - 16 May 1941	Succeeded by Generalleutnant Karl Böttcher
Preceded by Generalleutnant Sigfrid Henrici	Commander of 16th Infantry Division; 15 August 1941 - 15 November 1941	Succeeded by Generalleutnant Sigfrid Henrici
