= Werner Goeritz =

- Born: 9 March 1892
- Died: 27 May 1958 (aged 66)
- Military career
- Allegiance: Nazi Germany
- Branch: Army
- Rank: Generalleutnant
- Commands: 291. Infanterie-Division; 92. Infanterie-Division
- Conflicts: World War II
- Awards: Knight's Cross of the Iron Cross

Werner Goeritz (9 March 1892 – 27 May 1958) was a German general during World War II. He was a recipient of the Knight's Cross of the Iron Cross of Nazi Germany.

== Awards and decorations ==
- Knight's Cross of the Iron Cross on 6 November 1943 as Generalleutnant and commander of 291. Infanterie-Division

Military offices
Preceded by General der Artillerie Kurt Herzog	Commander of 291. Infanterie-Division; 10 June 1942 – 15 January 1944	Succeeded by Generalmajor Oskar Eckholt
