= 291st Infantry Division =

- German: 291. Infanterie-Division
- Active: February 1940 - January 1945
- Country: Nazi Germany
- Branch: Army
- Type: Infantry
- Role: Division
- Size: 15,000 Soldiers
- Nickname: Elk
- Engagements: World War II: Kamenets-Podolsky pocket

The German 291st Infantry Division was an infantry division of the Wehrmacht and served in World War II.

The division was formed in Insterburg in the military training area of Arys (south-east of Königsberg, East Prussia) in February 1940 as part of the 8th Wave. Created by using cadres from previously existing units, it took part in the attack on France but played no noticeable role there. During the expansion of the Heer in the autumn the division lost 3 Btns. of Infantry (I /504th, I /505th and I /506th.) and one of Artillery (III /291st.) to the newly raised 306. Infanterie Division, but these units were replaced before the division was assigned to Heeresgruppe Nord in early 1941 as 18. Armee's reserve as they prepared for the launching of Barbarossa. The "Elch" (Moose) division managed to advance 44 miles in the first 34 hours of the campaign in the Baltic States, but after being assigned the mission of clearing the Baltic coast, was temporarily stopped in their tracks at the naval base of Libau where Soviet Marines and 67th Rifle Division repelled their first attempt to rush the town on 25 June. Resorting to point blank artillery fire, Herzog's men finally overran the town after four days of fierce street and house fighting and continued advancing up the Baltic Coast before reaching the Latvian capital of Riga which was already under attack from the East by Philipp Kleffel's 1. Infanterie Division, the following day.

After helping secure Estonia during July and August, the division was deployed on the right wing of XXXVIII Korps's ring around the Oranienbaum Bridgehead in early September and broke through the Soviet first line of defenses around Leningrad at Popsha before turning north and taking Peterhof, on the Gulf of Finland, sealing in the Coastal Army. After this success, the front settled down into static positions that changed very little for almost two years, but, following his receiving the Knights Cross in mid-October, there was little time for Herzog and his men to catch their breath as they were shifted to 18th Armee's front along the Volkhov River to resist continued efforts by the Russians to break through to besieged Leningrad.

The division was finally withdrawn from the front in late December, but only had a few days' rest before Andrei Vlassov's 2nd Shock Army launched a massive offensive at the beginning of January aimed at the thinly held line at the junction of 61. Infanterie Division and 21. Infanterie Division. 505th Inf. Regt., under Oberst Lohmeyer to seal the breach, but it was only a question of time before they made another probe elsewhere. "A matter of time" was ten days, the breakthrough was slightly to the south, and it was the 291st that again stood in their way, but, despite atrocious weather, its men stood firm long enough for the Polizei and 58. Infanterie Division to cut off the Russian penetration, though fighting within the pocket went on until late June. After defeating the Soviet 2nd Shock Army's penetration of the front over the Volkhov River, and, despite the renewal of the offensive by the Russians in the Mga sector, just to the north of their positions, they were kept on the relatively quiet sector north of Novgorod until January 1943, when they were shifted to LIX Korps sector on the junction of Heeresgruppe Nord and Heeresgruppe Mitte. During that Winter the divisions three Infantry Regiments lost one battalion each, except for one company from each which was, initially, formed into a Ski battalion, but this unit was later converted to bicycles. Remaining in defensive positions around Korotsen over the Winter the division was reinforced by the recreation of 506th Gren. Regt. in February but was nearly annihilated by the Soviet 3rd Guards Tank Army near Shepetovka in early March. By June they were back on 4th Panzerarmee's front (XLII Korps) as they fell back through south-east Poland (also taking part in the fighting inside the Hube cauldron). The severely understrength Division rejoined XLII Corps in August.

On 1 January 1945, the division, then under command of the 4th Panzer Army of Army Group A, had a strength of 10,957 men.

The division remained with XLII Corps over-run and destroyed by 1st Ukrainian Front near Czestochowa (Tschensotchau) after the Soviets resumed their offensive in mid-January 1945. Some remnants were incorporated into the 6. Infanterie Divisions 37th Gren. Regt. whilst the remainder were used to augment 17. Infanterie-Division in March.

== Commanding officers ==
- General der Artillerie Kurt Herzog, 7 February 1940 – 10 June 1942
- Generalleutnant Werner Goeritz, 10 June 1942 – 15 January 1944
- Generalmajor Oskar Eckholt, 15 January – 10 July 1944
- Generalmajor Arthur Finger, 10 July 1944 – 27 January 1945

== Bibliography ==
- Dunn, Walter Scott (February 2009). Second Front Now - 1943: An Opportunity Delayed. 978-081735547-0. ISBN 978-0-8173-5547-0.
- Tessin, Georg (1974). Verbände und Truppen der deutschen Wehrmacht und Waffen–SS im Zweiten Weltkrieg 1939–1945 [Units and Troops of the German Military and Waffen-SS in the Second World War 1939–1945] (in German). Vol. 9: Die Landstreitkräfte 281–370 (Units 281–370). Osnabrück: Biblio. ISBN 3-7648-0872-1.
