= Sinyavino offensive =

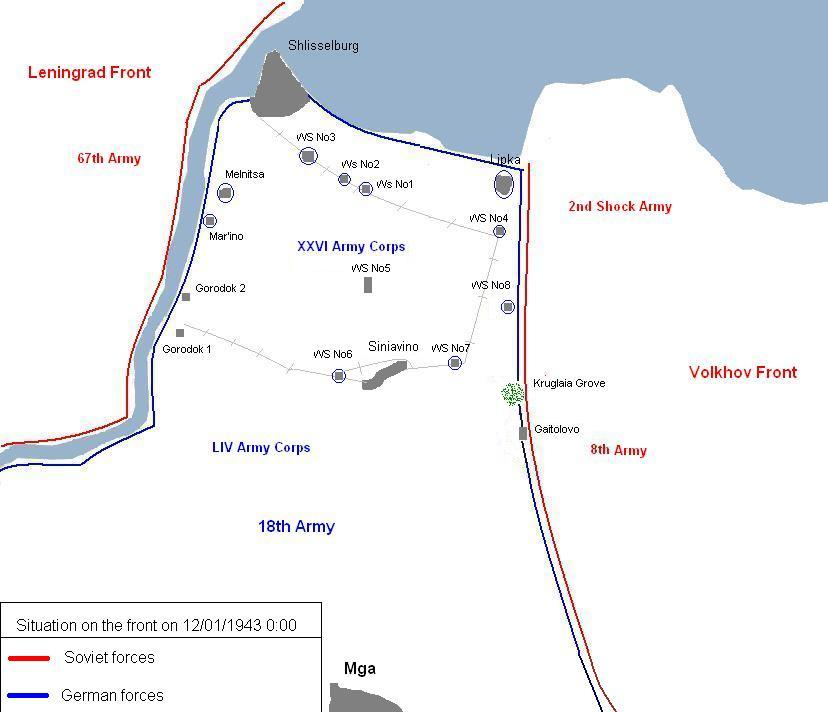
location of the Sinyavino Heights

The Sinyavino offensives were a series of Soviet offensives in 1941–1943 during World War II around the Sinyavino Heights, east of Leningrad, to lift the Siege of Leningrad. The area was only fully liberated during the Leningrad–Novgorod offensive in January 1944.

== List of battles ==
=== First Sinyavino offensive (1941) ===
The first Sinyavino offensive was a Soviet counterattack during the German Encirclement of Leningrad between 10 and 26 September 1941. It was executed by the 54th Army which attacked from the east and by the Leningrad Front's 115th Rifle Division and 4th Marines Brigade which attacked from the region of Nevskaya Dubrovka in Leningrad. The 54th Army Detachment advanced some 6–10 km, but was then surrounded and nearly entirely destroyed. The Leningrad Front troops made a forced crossing over the Neva River and occupied the Neva Bridgehead, but failed to advance any further. The Commander of the 54th Army, Marshal Grigory Kulik was relieved of command for the failure.

=== Second Sinyavino offensive (1941) ===
The second Sinyavino offensive was a Soviet operation between 20 and 28 October 1941. It was again executed by the 54th Army which attacked from the region south of Gaitolovo and by the Neva Operational Group which launched an attack from the Neva Bridgehead toward Sinyavino. Both attacks were unsuccessful, but significantly complicated the German Tikhvin offensive, which occurred at the same time.

=== Third Sinyavino offensive (summer 1942) ===
The third Sinyavino offensive was a major Soviet offensive between 19 August and 10 October 1942, with no results but with serious losses on both sides.

=== Fourth Sinyavino offensive (January 1943) ===
The fourth Sinyavino offensive, better known as Operation Iskra, was a successful Soviet offensive in January 1943 that conquered the territory north of Sinyavino and opened up a corridor between the besieged city of Leningrad and the rest of the Soviet Union. The Sinyavino Heights itself remained in German hands.

=== Fifth Sinyavino offensive (summer 1943) ===
The fifth Sinyavino offensive, also known as the Mga offensive (Soviet) or Third Battle of Lake Ladoga (German), was a Soviet offensive between 22 July and 25 September 1943, which made very little progress, but did succeed in conquering a substantial part of the Sinyavino Heights.

=== Sixth Sinyavino offensive (September 1943) ===
During the fifth Sinyavino offensive, there was a pause between 22 August and 15 September 1943, and therefore this battle is sometimes described as two different battles.

== Sources ==
- Saint Petersburg Encyclopaedia
- the article in the Russian Wikipedia, 1-я Синявинская операция (1941).
- the article in the Russian Wikipedia, 2-я Синявинская операция (1941).
