= Friedrich-Wilhelm von Chappuis =

German general in the Wehrmacht during World War II

- Born: 13 September 1886; Province of Posen, Kingdom of Prussia, German Empire
- Died: 27 August 1942 (aged 55); Magdeburg, Saxony-Anhalt, Nazi Germany
- Military career
- Allegiance: German Empire; Weimar Republic; Nazi Germany
- Branch: German Army
- Service years: 1906–1942
- Rank: General der Infanterie
- Commands: 15th Infantry Division; 16th Infantry Division; XXXVIII Army Corps
- Conflicts: World War I; World War II; Invasion of Poland; Battle of France; Operation Barbarossa; Siege of Leningrad
- Awards: Knight's Cross of the Iron Cross

Friedrich-Wilhelm von Chappuis (13 September 1886 – 27 August 1942) was a German general in the Wehrmacht during World War II who commanded the XXXVIII Army Corps.

After World War I he fought in the Freikorps during Silesian Uprisings with a rank of captain. He was a recipient of the Knight's Cross of the Iron Cross of Nazi Germany. Chappuis was relieved of this post on 24 April 1942 and transferred to the Führerreserve. He committed suicide on 27 August 1942.

== Awards ==
- Knight's Cross of the Iron Cross on 15 August 1940 as generalleutnant and commander of 15th Infantry Division
- Knight of Honour of the Order of St. John

Military offices
Preceded by Generalmajor Walter Behschnitt	Commander of 15th Infantry Division; 6 October 1939 – 12 August 1940	Succeeded by Generalleutnant Ernst-Eberhard Hell
Preceded by Generaloberst Hans-Valentin Hube	Commander of 16th Infantry Division; 12 August 1940 – 15 March 1941	Succeeded by Generalleutnant Sigfrid Henrici
Preceded by Generalfeldmarschall Erich von Manstein	Commander of XXXVIII Army Corps; 15 March 1941 – 23 April 1942	Succeeded by General der Infanterie Siegfried Haenicke
